= Ogden station (CTA) =

Rapid transit station in Chicago, 1895–1953

OGDEN 1800W 400S
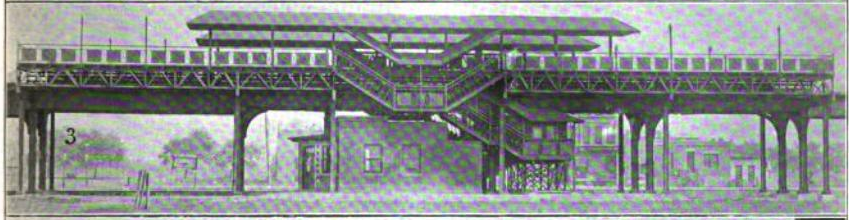
- Typical station on the Metropolitan's double-tracked lines, of which Ogden was an example

General information
- Coordinates: 41.875670°N 87.673018°W
- Owner: Chicago Transit Authority
- Line: Garfield Park branch
- Platforms: 2 side platforms
- Tracks: 2 tracks

Construction
- Structure type: Elevated

History
- Opened: June 19, 1895
- Closed: September 27, 1953

Former services
Preceding station	Chicago "L"	Following station
Hoyne toward Des Plaines	Garfield Park branch	Marshfield Terminus
Preceding station	Chicago Aurora and Elgin Railroad	Following station
Kedzie Avenue One-way operation	Main Line	Canal Street toward Chicago
Location

Ogden was a rapid transit station serving the Chicago "L"'s Garfield Park branch between 1895 and 1953, when it was demolished alongside the rest of the Garfield Park branch to be replaced by the Congress Line located in the median of the Eisenhower Expressway. The Chicago Aurora and Elgin Railroad (CA&E), who had used the tracks of the Garfield Park branch since 1905, began stopping eastbound at Ogden in the late 1940s or early 1950s, rather than Marshfield to the east, after the Chicago Transit Authority complained of the CA&E's trains causing delays at Marshfield. This ended when the CA&E discontinued service in the area on September 20, 1953. For the brief period of time when the Garfield Park branch was subject to skip-stop, Ogden was an "A" station. On the new Congress Line, the Ogden entrance to the Illinois Medical District station served as the replacement of the Garfield Park branch's Ogden station.

The station resembled other stations on the Garfield Park and Logan Square branches, surviving examples of which include Damen and California stations on the Blue Line. Such stations had a station house of red pressed brick atop a sill and foundation of stone designed in a Queen Anne and Romanesque style with extensive terra cotta, comprising a semicircular bay with doors formally marked "Entrance" and "Exit" despite lack of an enforcement mechanism, a dentiled cornice of latticed brick, and a beaded wooden canopy over the doors. Their platforms were two wooden side platforms atop steel frames, with cast iron canopies with tin hipped roofs and railings adorned with square plates with diamond designs.
