= Pulaski station (CTA Blue Line) =

Chicago "L" station

Pulaski 4000W 530S
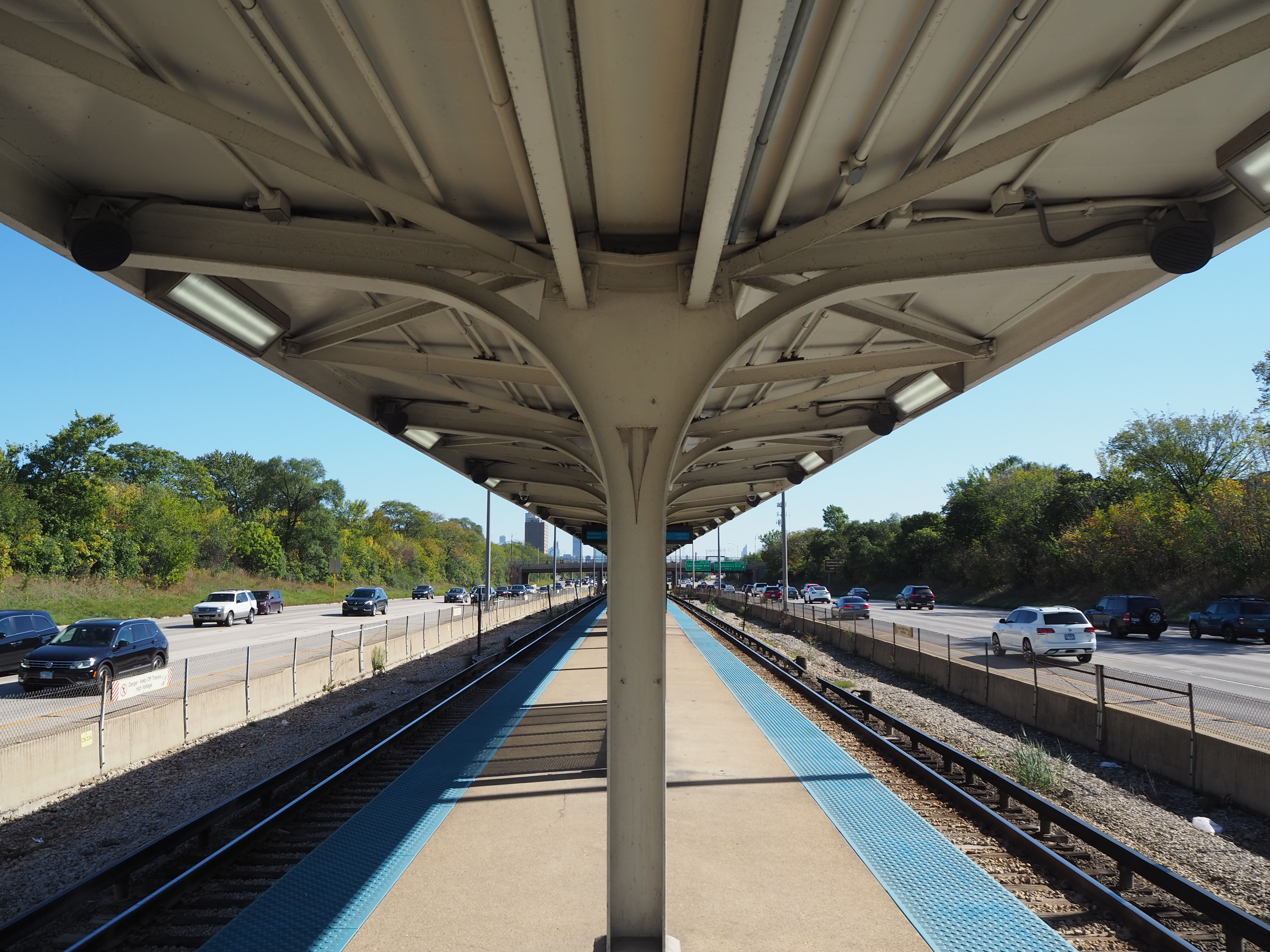

General information
- Location: 530 South Pulaski Road; Chicago, Illinois 60624
- Coordinates: 41.873797°N 87.725663°W
- Owner: Chicago Transit Authority
- Line: Forest Park Branch
- Platforms: 1 island platform
- Tracks: 2

Construction
- Structure type: Expressway median
- Accessible: No

History
- Opened: June 22, 1958; 68 years ago

Passengers
- 2025: 204,102 ▼8.9%

Services
Preceding station	Chicago "L"	Following station
Cicero toward Forest Park	Blue Line	Kedzie–Homan toward O'Hare
Former services
Preceding station	Chicago "L"	Following station
Kostner Closed 1973 toward Des Plaines	Congress branch	Kedzie toward Jefferson Park
Former services at elevated station
Preceding station	Chicago "L"	Following station
Tripp toward Des Plaines	Garfield Park branch	Garfield Park toward Marshfield
Track layout
Location

Pulaski is a station on the Chicago 'L' system, serving the Blue Line's Forest Park branch. The station is located in the median of the Eisenhower Expressway and serves the West Garfield Park neighborhood. A long ramp connects the platform to the station house on the Pulaski Road overpass. There was originally a similar entrance from the Keeler Avenue overpass; the entrance from Keeler was closed to cut costs on January 15, 1973, but retained as an exit, and the exit was fully closed on December 28, 1978. The structure for this exit still stands but it is closed to the public.

== History ==
=== Elevated station ===
The original Pulaski station (then called 40th Avenue station) opened in 1895 along with several other stations on the Garfield Park branch of the Metropolitan West Side Elevated. Because 40th Avenue was renamed to Crawford Avenue and later to Pulaski Road, the station was renamed twice in 1913 and in 1935 respectively. When skip-stop service was implemented on the Garfield Park branch on December 9, 1951, the station was designated an AB station, meaning all trains stop at this station. The elevated station was eventually closed in 1958 in favor of a newly-opened replacement station in the median of the Congress Expressway.

=== Expressway-median station ===
The new Pulaski station opened on June 22, 1958, on the Congress branch. This time, however, the station was designated an A station. During the time the CTA used skip-stop service, A trains west of Racine station were routed along the Congress branch, while B trains were routed along the Douglas branch (today's Pink Line). In an effort to cut cost, access to Keeler Avenue was limited to exiting passengers on January 15, 1973; the ramp was closed entirely on December 28, 1978.

== Bus connections ==
CTA

- 7 Harrison (weekdays only)
- 53 Pulaski (Owl Service)
