= California station (CTA Congress Line) =

California 2800W 430S
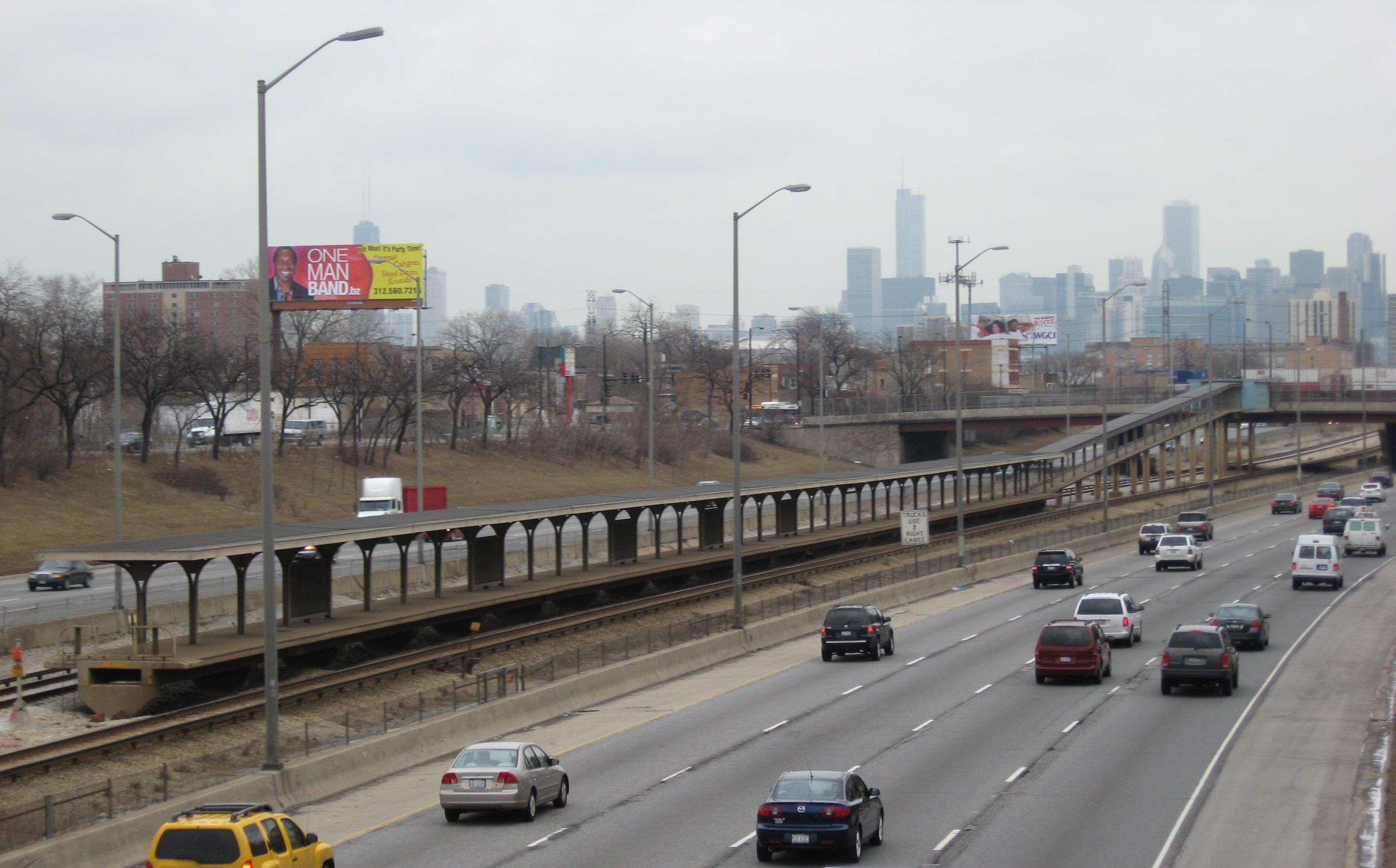

General information
- Location: 430 South California Avenue; Chicago, Illinois 60612
- Coordinates: 41.8754°N 87.6964°W
- Owner: Chicago Transit Authority
- Line: Congress Branch
- Platforms: 1 island platform
- Tracks: 2

History
- Opened: June 22, 1958; 68 years ago
- Closed: September 2, 1973; 53 years ago

Former services
Preceding station	Chicago "L"	Following station
Kedzie toward Des Plaines	Congress branch	Western toward Jefferson Park
Former services at elevated station
Preceding station	Chicago "L"	Following station
Sacramento toward Des Plaines	Garfield Park branch	Western toward Marshfield
Track layout
Location

California is an abandoned rapid transit station in the East Garfield Park neighborhood of Chicago, Illinois. It is located in the median of the Eisenhower Expressway, The station served the Chicago Transit Authority's Congress Line, which is now part of the Blue Line. California opened on June 22, 1958, and closed on September 2, 1973, as part of a group of budget-related CTA station closings.

== History ==
=== Elevated station ===
The original California station opened in 1895 along with several other stations on the Garfield Park branch of the Metropolitan West Side Elevated. When skip-stop service was introduced on the branch in December 9, 1951, California station was designated a B station, meaning only B trains stop at this station. The elevated station closed in 1953 as trains on the branch were rerouted to the temporary tracks along Van Buren Street. The temporary trackage was built to accommodate the construction of the Congress Expressway and a new branch line along the median.

=== Expressway-median station ===
The new California station opened on June 22, 1958, on the newly-built Congress branch. Unlike its elevated predecessor, the station was designated an A station, meaning A trains stop at this station. In fact, all stations on the branch west of Racine station were designated A stations; B trains would travel along the Douglas branch (part of today's Pink Line). The station closed on September 2, 1973, as part of a systemwide service reduction.

== See also ==
- Central station (CTA Congress Line)
- Kostner station (CTA Congress Line)
