= Central station (CTA Congress Line) =

Defunct Chicago "L" station

Central 5600W 720S
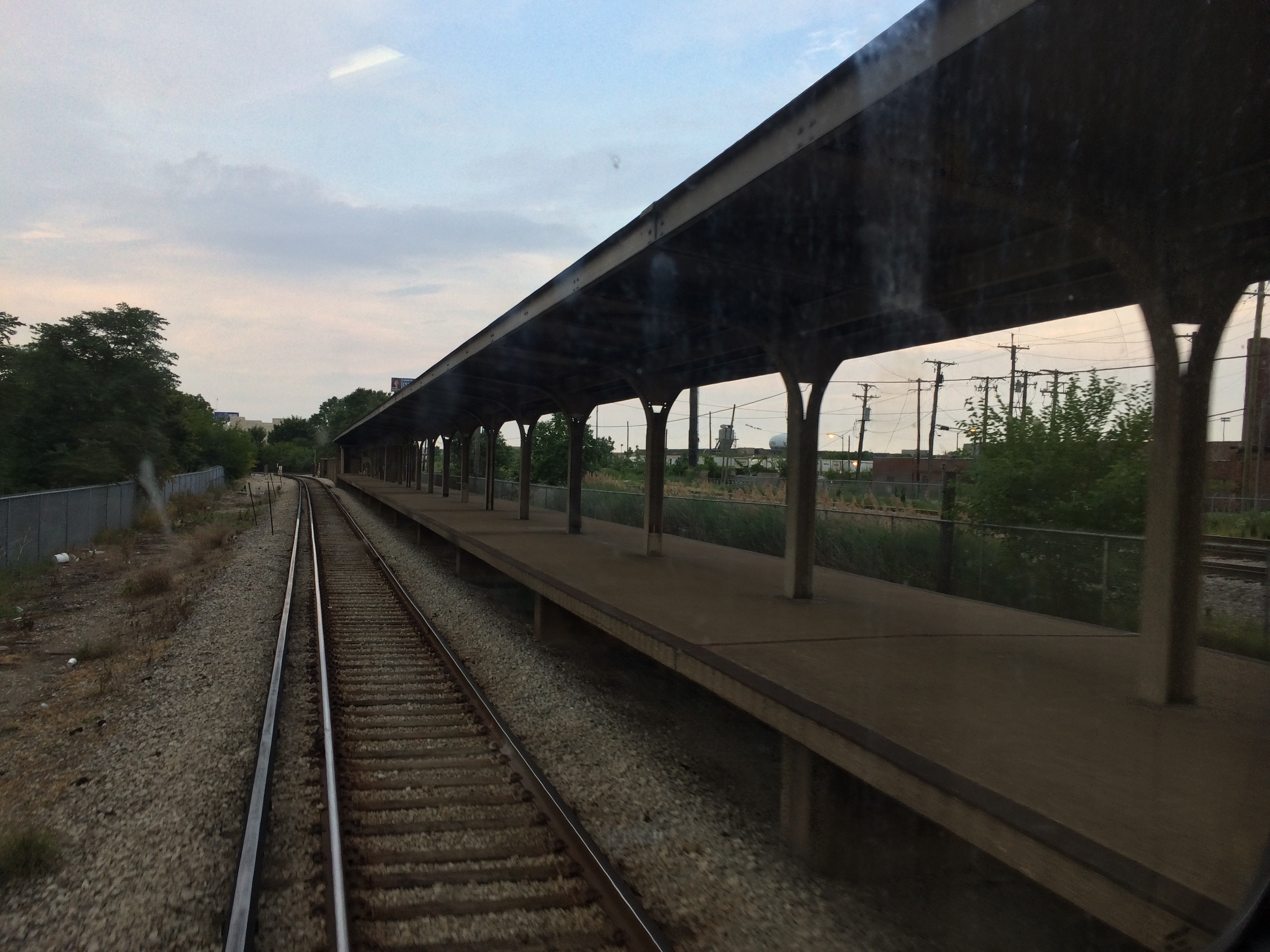
- The abandoned Central station as of July 2017

General information
- Location: 800 South Central Avenue; Chicago, Illinois 60644
- Coordinates: 41.8701°N 87.7648°W
- Owner: Chicago Transit Authority
- Line: Congress Branch
- Platforms: 1 island platform
- Tracks: 2

Construction
- Structure type: Elevated

History
- Opened: October 10, 1960; 66 years ago
- Closed: September 2, 1973; 53 years ago

Former services
| Preceding station | Chicago "L" | Following station |
|---|---|---|
| Austin toward Des Plaines | Congress branch | Cicero toward Jefferson Park |
1902–1960 station
| Austin toward Des Plaines | Garfield Park branch | Laramie toward Marshfield |

Future services
| Preceding station | Chicago "L" | Following station |
|---|---|---|
| Austin toward Forest Park | Blue Line | Cicero toward O'Hare |
Track layout
Location

Central is an abandoned rapid transit station in the Austin neighborhood of Chicago, Illinois. The station served the Chicago Transit Authority's Congress Line, which is now part of the Blue Line. Central opened on October 10, 1960, but due to low ridership Central closed on September 2, 1973, as part of a group of budget-related CTA station closings.

== History ==
=== AE&C and Garfield Park branch station ===
The Aurora Elgin and Chicago Railroad (AE&C) began operation on August 25, 1902. By October, the AE&C opened an at-grade station, which comprised two side platforms, at Central Avenue. On March 11, 1905, the Metropolitan West Side Elevated Railroad extended the Garfield Park branch from 52nd Avenue station to Des Plaines Avenue station via existing trackage. With the implementation of skip-stop service on the Garfield Park branch on December 9, 1951, this station was designated a B station, meaning only B trains stop at this station. The construction of the Congress Expressway necessitated the temporary rerouting of the branch between Central and Lombard stations on August 29, 1954. Consequently, the old station was replaced with an interim station, which contained an island platform. After a couple of relocations of the interim station, a permanent station opened on October 10, 1960.

=== Congress branch station ===
The station opened on October 10, 1960. The station was designated an A station, as all Congress branch stations west of Racine station were served by A trains. On September 2, 1973, this station, along with several others, were closed due to budget woes.

== Future reopening ==
On December 16, 2025, Illinois Senate Bill 2111, the Northern Illinois Transit Authority Act, was passed into law, which authorized the reconstruction and reintroduction into revenue service of Central by January 1, 2029. In May 2026, the deadline for reopening Central station was pushed back to January 1, 2031, after the Illinois General Assembly passed a bill that amended the NITA Act.

== See also ==
- California station (CTA Congress Line)
- Kostner station (CTA Congress Line)
