= Austin station (CTA Blue Line) =

Chicago "L" station

Austin 1W 1000S
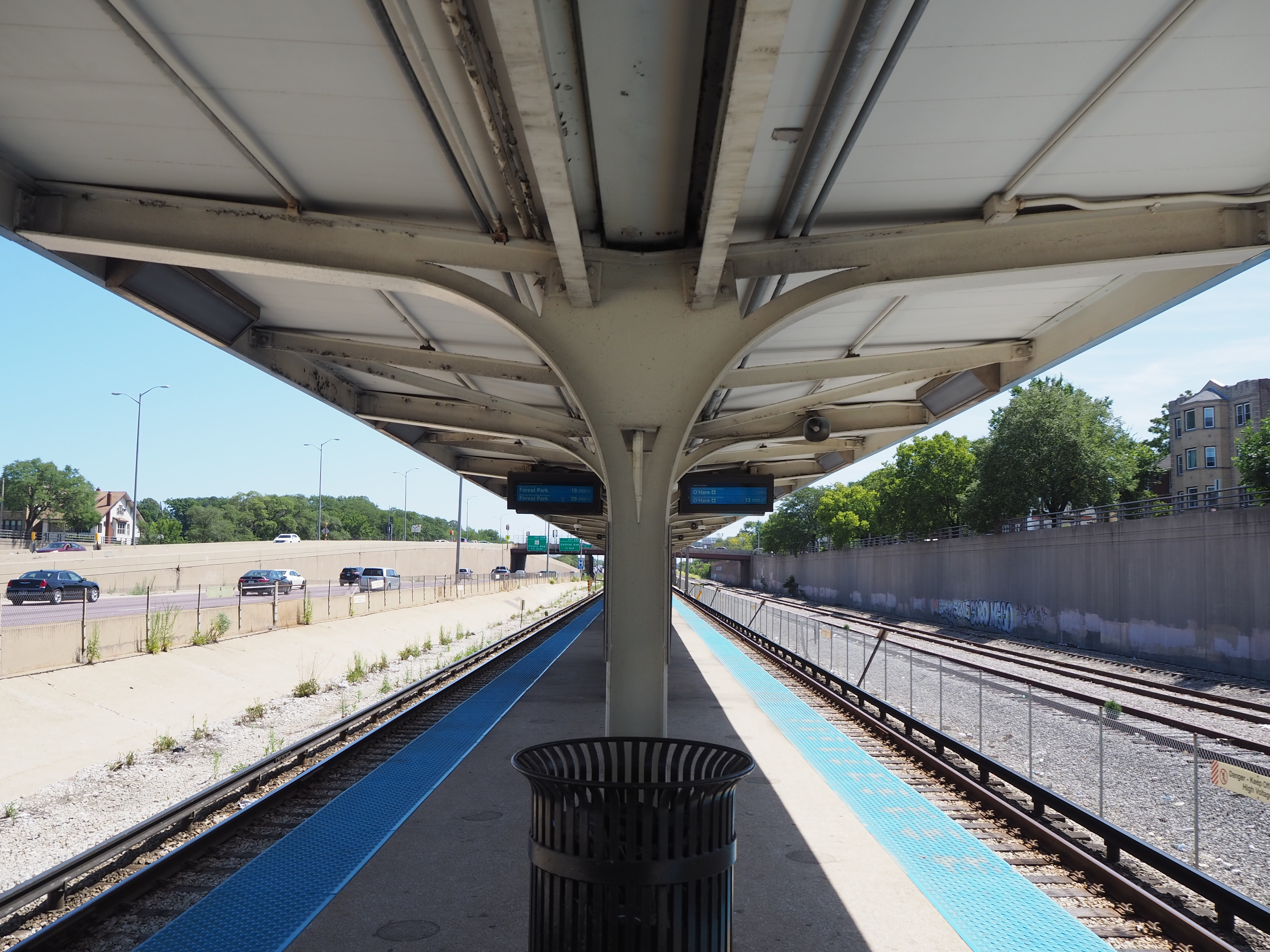

General information
- Location: 1050 South Austin Boulevard; Oak Park, Illinois 60304
- Coordinates: 41.870851°N 87.776812°W
- Owner: Chicago Transit Authority
- Line: Forest Park Branch
- Platforms: 1 island platform
- Tracks: 2

Construction
- Structure type: Expressway median
- Accessible: No

History
- Opened: December 27, 1960; 65 years ago

Passengers
- 2025: 211,662 ▲6.3%

Services
Preceding station	Chicago "L"	Following station
Oak Park toward Forest Park	Blue Line	Cicero toward O'Hare
Former services
Preceding station	Chicago "L"	Following station
Oak Park toward Des Plaines	Congress branch	Central Closed 1973 toward Jefferson Park
Austin and Lombard stations (1902–1960)
Gunderson toward Des Plaines	Garfield Park branch	Central toward Marshfield
Track layout
Location

Austin is a station on the 'L' system, serving the Blue Line's Forest Park branch. It is located at Austin Boulevard alongside the Eisenhower Expressway in Oak Park, Illinois. The station has an auxiliary entrance/exit at Lombard Avenue. After CTA Blue Line trains pass the station, the CTA line splits away from the Baltimore and Ohio Chicago Terminal Railroad lines letting the CTA Blue Line continue into Chicago afterwards.

== History ==
=== AE&C and Garfield Park branch stations ===
The Aurora Elgin and Chicago Railroad (AE&C) began operation on August 25, 1902. Two at-grade stations, each with two side platforms, opened at Austin Avenue and Lombard Avenue. On March 11, 1905, the Metropolitan West Side Elevated Railroad extended the Garfield Park branch from 52nd Avenue to Des Plaines Avenue via existing trackage. With the implementation of skip-stop service on the Garfield Park branch on December 9, 1951, Austin and Lombard stations were designated an A station and a B station, respectively. Lombard station was closed on September 20, 1953, to compensate for the lowered speed along the temporarily rerouted section between Sacramento Avenue and Aberdeen Street. The rerouting was necessitated by the construction of the Congress Expressway, which, on August 29, 1954, led to another rerouting between Central and Lombard avenues. Consequently, the old Austin station was replaced with an interim station, which contained an island platform. Rapid transit access to/from Lombard Avenue reopened on September 27. A couple more station relocations occurred, one of which led to the closure of the Lombard Avenue entrance on September 6, 1957. Two permanent tracks entered service on March 20, 1960, but the new Austin station was not complete until December 27, 1960.

=== Congress branch station ===
The new Austin station, alongside the auxiliary access to/from Lombard Avenue, opened on December 27, 1960. During the time the CTA used skip-stops, the station was designated an A station, as all Congress branch stations west of Racine station were served by A trains.

== Bus connections ==
CTA

- 91 Austin

Pace

- 315 Austin Boulevard - Midway
