= Cicero station (CTA Blue Line) =

Chicago "L" station

Cicero 4800W 700S
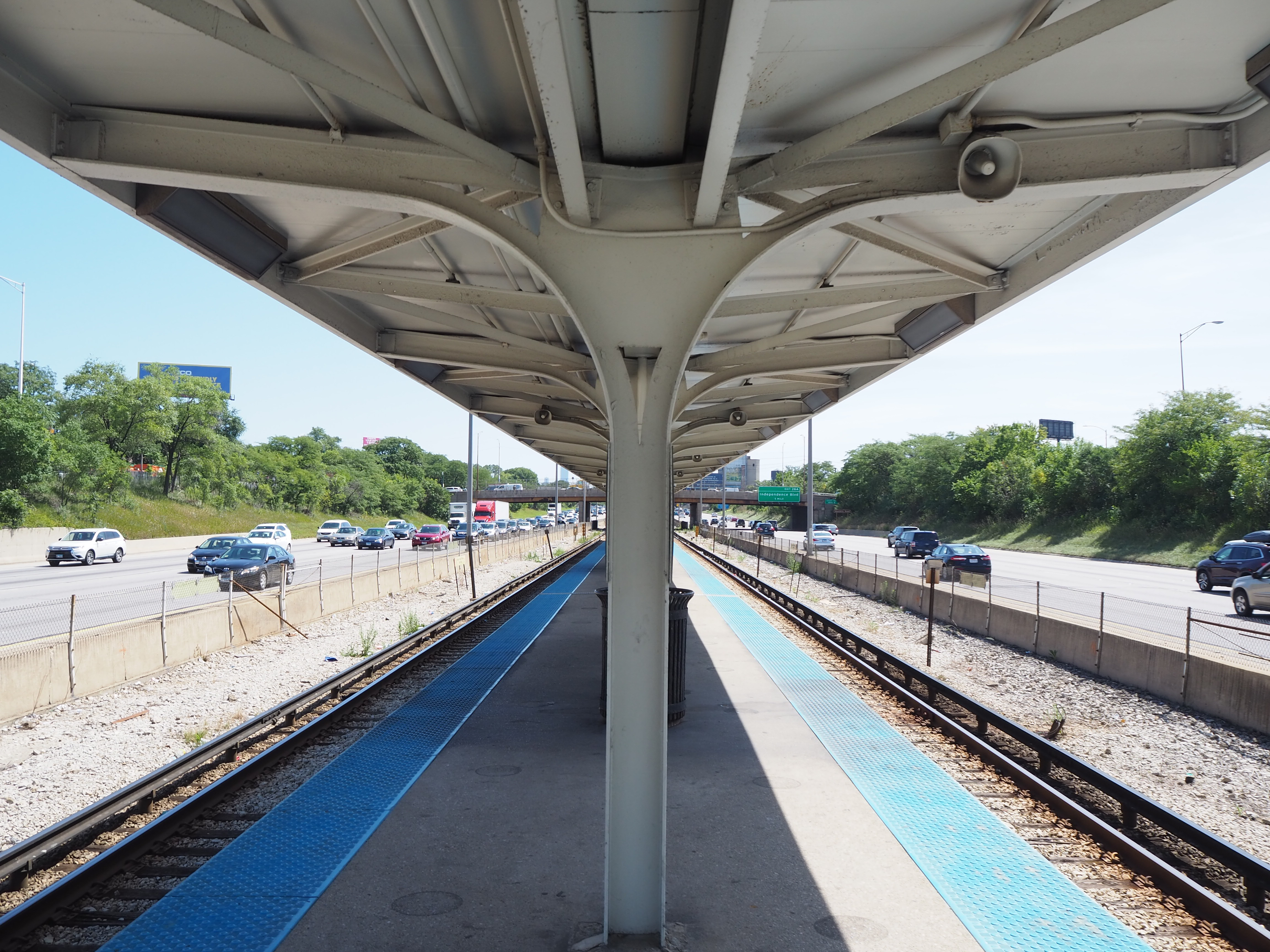

General information
- Location: 720 South Cicero Avenue; Chicago, Illinois 60644
- Coordinates: 41.871574°N 87.745154°W
- Owner: Chicago Transit Authority
- Line: Forest Park Branch
- Platforms: 1 island platform
- Tracks: 2

Construction
- Structure type: Expressway median
- Accessible: No

History
- Opened: June 22, 1958; 68 years ago

Passengers
- 2025: 181,628 ▼4.1%

Services
Preceding station	Chicago "L"	Following station
Austin toward Forest Park	Blue Line	Pulaski toward O'Hare
Former services
Preceding station	Chicago "L"	Following station
Central Closed 1973 toward Des Plaines	Congress branch	Kostner Closed 1973 toward Jefferson Park
Former services at elevated station
Preceding station	Chicago "L"	Following station
Laramie toward Des Plaines	Garfield Park branch	Kilbourn toward Marshfield
Track layout
Location

Cicero is a station on the 'L' system, serving the Blue Line's Forest Park branch. It is located in the median of the Eisenhower Expressway and serving the Austin neighborhood. Originally, Cicero had an additional entrance at Lavergne Avenue, but this was closed on May 16, 1977, by the CTA as a cost-cutting measure. The structure for this exit still stands but it is closed to the public.

This is the last station on the Forest Park branch within the Chicago city limits. It is located a short distance from the Town of Cicero.

== History ==
=== Elevated station ===
The original Cicero station (then called 48th Avenue station) opened in 1895 along with several other stations on the Garfield Park branch of the Metropolitan West Side Elevated. It was a terminal station until its 1902 extension to 52nd Avenue station, an Aurora Elgin and Chicago Railroad station. With the implementation of skip-stop service on the Garfield Park branch on December 9, 1951, this station was designated an AB station, meaning all trains stop at this station. The elevated station was eventually closed in 1958 in favor of a newly-built replacement station on the median of the Congress Expressway.

=== Expressway-median station ===
The current station opened on June 22, 1958, on the Congress branch. Unlike its elevated predecessor, the station was designated an A station. During the time the CTA used skip-stop service, A trains west of Racine station continued along the Congress branch while B trains was routed along the Douglas branch (today's Pink Line). A ramp connection to Lavergne Avenue pedestrian overpass was also open until 1977.

== Bus connections ==
CTA

- 7 Harrison (weekdays only)
- 54 Cicero
- 57 Laramie

Pace

- 305 East Roosevelt Road
- 316 Laramie Avenue (Monday–Saturday only)
- 392 Green Line Cicero CTA/UPS Hodgkins (Weekday UPS shifts only)
