= Western station (CTA Blue Line Forest Park branch) =

Chicago "L" station

Western 2400W 430S
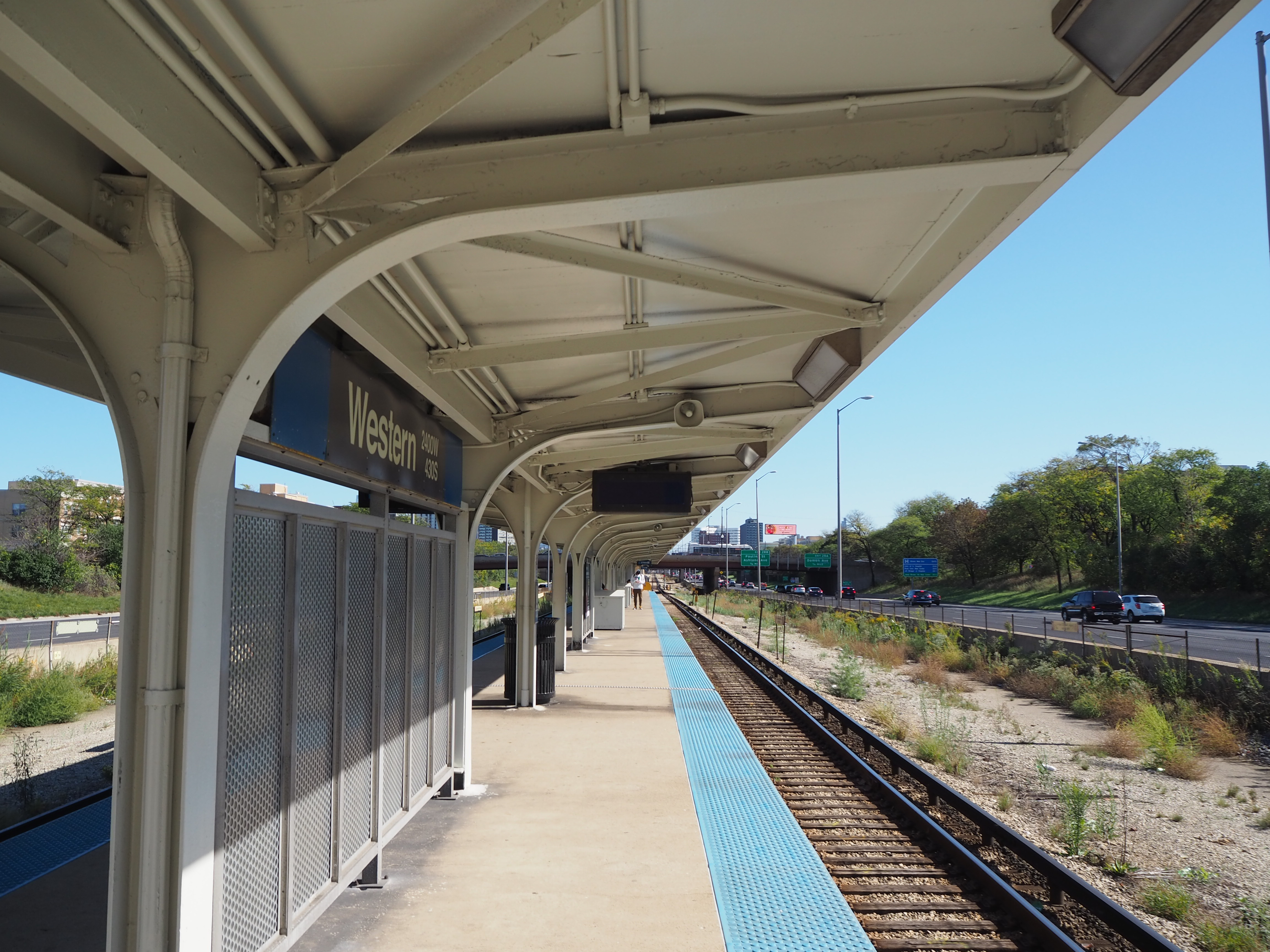

General information
- Location: 430 South Western Avenue; Chicago, Illinois 60612
- Coordinates: 41.875478°N 87.688436°W
- Owner: Chicago Transit Authority
- Line: Forest Park Branch
- Platforms: 1 island platform
- Tracks: 2

Construction
- Structure type: Expressway median
- Cycle facilities: Yes
- Accessible: No

History
- Opened: June 22, 1958; 68 years ago

Passengers
- 2025: 192,619 ▼3.7%

Services
Preceding station	Chicago "L"	Following station
Kedzie–Homan toward Forest Park	Blue Line	Illinois Medical District toward O'Hare
Former services
Preceding station	Chicago "L"	Following station
California Closed 1973 toward Des Plaines	Congress branch	Medical Center toward Jefferson Park
Former services at elevated station
Preceding station	Chicago "L"	Following station
California toward Des Plaines	Garfield Park branch	Hoyne toward Marshfield
Track layout
Location

Western is a rapid transit station on the 'L' system, serving the Blue Line's Forest Park branch. It is located in the median of the Eisenhower Expressway in Chicago's Near West Side neighborhood and is near Crane Tech High School. The station is also approximately 1 mile (1.6 km) north of the Western Avenue Metra commuter railroad station.

== History ==
=== Elevated station ===
The original Western station opened in 1895 along with numerous stations on the Metropolitan West Side Elevated lines. When skip-stop service was implemented on the Garfield Park branch in 1951, Western station was designated an A station (only A trains would stop at this station). In 1953, the elevated station was closed in favor of temporary tracks running along Van Buren Street. The temporary tracks were built to accommodate the construction of the Congress Expressway and an expressway-median branch.

=== Expressway-median station ===
The expressway-median station opened on June 22, 1958. During the time when the CTA utilized skip-stop services, the station was designated as an A station, much like its elevated predecessor. This time, however, all stations on the Congress branch west of Racine station were A stations; B trains would run along the Douglas branch (part of today's Pink Line).

== Bus connections ==
CTA

- 7 Harrison (weekdays only)
- 49 Western (Owl Service)
- X49 Western Express (weekday rush hours only)
