= Kedzie station (CTA Garfield Park branch) =

Rapid transit station in Chicago, 1895–1958

KEDZIE 3200W 600S
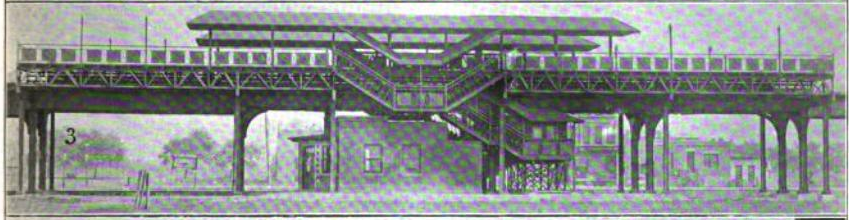
- Typical station on the Metropolitan's double-tracked lines, of which Kedzie was an example

General information
- Location: 615 South Kedzie Avenue; Chicago, Illinois
- Coordinates: 41.87321°N 87.70554°W
- Owner: Chicago Transit Authority (1947–1958); Chicago Rapid Transit Company (1924–1947); See text before 1924
- Lines: Metropolitan main line; Chicago Aurora and Elgin Railroad
- Platforms: 2 side platforms
- Tracks: 4 tracks

Construction
- Structure type: Elevated

History
- Opened: June 19, 1895
- Closed: June 22, 1958

Key dates
- March 11, 1905: AE&C (later CA&E) service introduced
- September 20, 1953: CA&E service discontinued

Former services
Preceding station	Chicago "L"	Following station
St. Louis toward Des Plaines	Garfield Park branch	Sacramento Closed 1952 toward Marshfield
Preceding station	Chicago Aurora and Elgin Railroad	Following station
Laramie Avenue toward Wheaton	Main Line	Marshfield Avenue One-way operation
Location

Kedzie was a rapid transit station on the Chicago "L", serving the Garfield Park branch of its Metropolitan West Side Elevated Railroad, from 1895 to 1958. Between 1905 and 1953, it also served the Chicago Aurora and Elgin Railroad (CA&E), an interurban using Garfield Park tracks, between 1905 and 1953.

The station was demolished when it and the branch were replaced by the Congress Line, which contains the Kedzie–Homan station where the old Kedzie station once was.

== History ==
The Metropolitan West Side Elevated Railroad Company was granted a 50-year franchise by the Chicago City Council on April 7, 1892, and began securing right of way shortly thereafter. As designed, the Metropolitan's operations comprised a main line that went westward from downtown to diverge into three branches – one northwest to Logan Square, one due west to Garfield Park, and one southwest to Douglas Park – and serve various parts of Chicago's west side. A further branch to Humboldt Park would proceed due west from the Logan Square branch past Robey Street. (Note: Technically, the Logan Square branch started after Robey and was, like the Humboldt Park branch, a divergence from what was formally known as the "Northwest branch". However, as early as 1898, even the Metropolitan itself was referring to the Northwest branch as part of the "Logan Square branch", although ridership statistics continued to separate them.) The Metropolitan entered service on May 6, 1895, and the Garfield Park branch opened on June 19.

The Metropolitan's lines were originally operated by the West Side Construction Company, which had been responsible for constructing them, and were transferred to the Metropolitan on October 6, 1896. The backers and officers of the two companies were largely identical, however, so this transfer of ownership was nominal. The expenses incurred in constructing the Metropolitan's vast trackage would catch up to the company, which entered receivership in 1897; the similarly named Metropolitan West Side Elevated Railway Company was organized in January 1899 and assumed operations on February 3 of that year.

The interurban Aurora Elgin and Chicago Railway (AE&C) was incorporated in 1901 and began service on August 25, 1902, between Aurora and the Garfield Park branch's 52nd Avenue station in Chicago. The AE&C and Metropolitan entered a trackage rights agreement in 1905, whereby AE&C trains were allowed to go into downtown Chicago via the Metropolitan's tracks and Wells Street Terminal and the Metropolitan could extend its service westward on AE&C tracks to its station on Des Plaines Avenue. This agreement went into effect on March 11. Having gone bankrupt in 1919 due to rising inflation from World War I and state regulations, the AE&C was split into two parts, one of which was the Chicago Aurora and Elgin Railroad (CA&E), in 1921.

The Metropolitan, along with the other companies operating "L" lines in Chicago, became a part of the Chicago Elevated Railways (CER) trust on July 1, 1911. CER acted as a de facto holding company for the "L" – unifying its operations, instituting the same management across the companies, and instituting free transfers between the lines starting in 1913 – but kept the underlying companies intact. This continued until the companies were formally merged into the single Chicago Rapid Transit Company (CRT), which assumed operations on January 9, 1924; the former Metropolitan was designated the Metropolitan Division of the CRT for administrative purposes. Although municipal ownership of transit had been a hotly-contested issue for half a century, the publicly owned Chicago Transit Authority (CTA) would not be created until 1945, or assume operation of the "L" until October 1, 1947.

=== Replacement ===
A superhighway that would become Interstate 290 or the "Eisenhower", following the route of Congress Street, had been proposed since the 1909 Plan of Chicago and more thoroughly planned in the early 1930s. A 1939 plan introduced the idea of replacing the main line and Garfield Park branch with a line of rapid transit running through this highway. Construction on the expressway and the "Congress Line" was adopted by the City Council in 1940 and formally authorized for construction in 1946. Three different agreements were made between the CTA, Chicago, Cook County, and Illinois between 1951 and 1954 concerning the financing and ownership of the new construction, which soon commenced.

Changes were made to the Garfield Park and Douglas Park lines on December 9, 1951. Several stations were closed, and Skip-stop, wherein trains were designated either as "A" trains or "B" trains and stopped at respective "A" or "B" stations, was applied during weekdays to the surviving stations; Kedzie was designated an "all-stop" station under this scheme and was thus unaffected. "L" service to the Wells Street Terminal was also discontinued, meaning that only CA&E trains served it from then on.

More changes came in September 1953; the Garfield Park "L" trackage was replaced by temporary street-level ("at-grade") tracks between Sacramento Boulevard and Aberdeen Street, essentially removing all stops between Kedzie and Halsted on the main line. This change impacted westbound trains on September 20, 1953, and eastbound trains on September 27. The CA&E, having long struggled financially, refused to use the at-grade tracks due to safety concerns as well as the prospect of delays caused by the use of traffic signals at road crossings, and had serious doubts about its ability to reroute its right of way into the new expressway median; despite some speculative plans for alternative train service to downtown Chicago, and after being disallowed by state regulators to abandon rail service altogether in favor of buses, the CA&E ultimately abandoned service east of Des Plaines on September 20.

Garfield Park service ended altogether on June 22, 1958. The new line contains a station spanning Kedzie and Homan Avenues near where Kedzie had stood.

== Station details ==
=== Operations ===
As originally opened, the Metropolitan's trains ran every six minutes between 6 a.m. and 6:30 p.m., and every ten minutes during the night; the average speed was 16 mph (26 km/h). By 1898, this schedule was updated so that trains ran at 30-minute intervals on each branch during night hours.

The CA&E stopped at Kedzie to board westbound passengers and alight eastbound passengers; lest it compete with the "L" directly, patrons were not allowed to board eastbound trains at Kedzie, nor were westbound passengers allowed to alight at stations within the "L"'s area of service.

== Works cited ==
- "The Metropolitan West Side Elevated Railroad of Chicago". The Street Railway Review. 5: 263–274. January 15, 1895.
- Public Information Department (1967). Congress Rapid Transit. Chicago: Chicago Transit Authority – via Internet Archive.
- CTA Rail Entrance, Annual Traffic, 1900–1979 (Report). Chicago: Chicago Transit Authority. October 1, 1979.
- Moffat, Bruce G. (1995). The "L": The Development of Chicago's Rapid Transit System, 1888–1932. Chicago: Central Electric Railfans' Association. ISBN 0-915348-30-6.
- Weller, Peter; Stark, Fred (1999). The Living Legacy of the Chicago Aurora and Elgin. San Francisco: Forum Press. ISBN 0-945213-41-7 – via Internet Archive.
