= Kostner station (CTA Congress Line) =

Kostner 4400W 530S
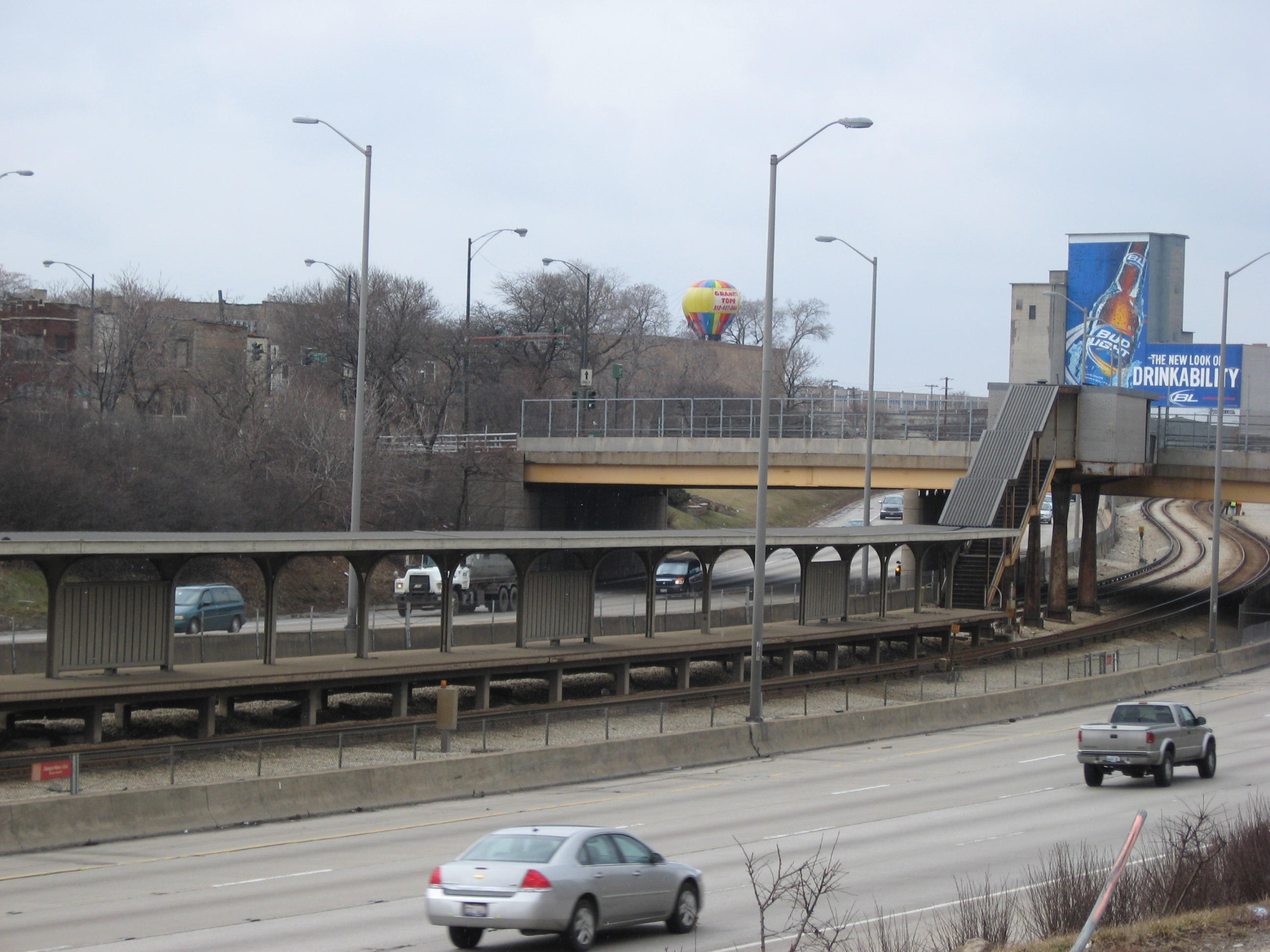
- The abandoned Kostner CTA station as seen along the Eisenhower Expressway

General information
- Location: 530 South Kostner Avenue; Chicago, Illinois 60624
- Coordinates: 41.8734°N 87.7350°W
- Owner: Chicago Transit Authority
- Line: Congress Branch
- Platforms: 1 island platform
- Tracks: 2 tracks

History
- Opened: August 5, 1962; 64 years ago
- Closed: September 2, 1973; 53 years ago

Former services
Preceding station	Chicago "L"	Following station
Cicero toward Des Plaines	Congress branch	Pulaski toward Jefferson Park
Track layout
Location

Kostner is an abandoned rapid transit station in the West Garfield Park neighborhood of Chicago, Illinois. The station served the Chicago Transit Authority's Congress Line, which is now part of the Blue Line. Kostner opened on August 5, 1962; it was one of two stations on the Congress Line which was not opened with the line on June 22, 1958. The station closed on September 2, 1973, due to low ridership.

== History ==
When the CTA planned the Congress Line, they did not plan to put a station at Kostner. The Pulaski and Cicero stations were both close to Kostner, and the CTA felt that the lower population density of West Garfield Park did not need an additional station. It was also trying to cut down on stations in order to reduce travel times and increase efficiency. However, the Garfield Park line, which the Congress Line replaced, had a station at Kilbourn Avenue, and the Congress Line did not have a corresponding station. Neighborhood residents wanted the CTA to build a replacement station at Kostner Avenue.

In response to the neighborhood pressure, the Chicago City Council passed an ordinance requiring the CTA and the Chicago Department of Public Works to build a station at Kostner. However, the CTA did not build the station, claiming that ridership at the station would never be high and travel times on the Congress Line would increase. Residents tried to respond, saying that they would be happy with an inexpensive wooden platform and a staircase. Eventually, the residents circulated a petition for the station's construction and threatened to sue the Department of Public Works.

The CTA responded to the residents and agreed to build a Kostner station in 1961. The city also agreed to build the station, and the CTA did track, signaling, and electrical work. The construction was complicated by the Congress Line's operation; the city built the station between the Congress Line's tracks, but the line still had to run while Kostner was being built. The CTA solved this problem by creating two temporary bypass tracks around the construction site. Congress Line trains used these tracks from November 2, 1961 to July 8, 1962.

Kostner was dedicated on August 3, 1962, at an official ceremony attended by Mayor Richard J. Daley and opened to the public two days later, on August 5. As the CTA predicted, the station never had high ridership. Station entrances peaked at 258,000 in 1967 and fell steadily after that to 137,791 in 1972, its last full year of operation. Kostner closed on September 2, 1973, as part of a group of budget-related CTA station closings; it was one of the shortest-lived CTA stations. The CTA never demolished Kostner, and the boarded-up station still sits on its original site.

== Structure ==
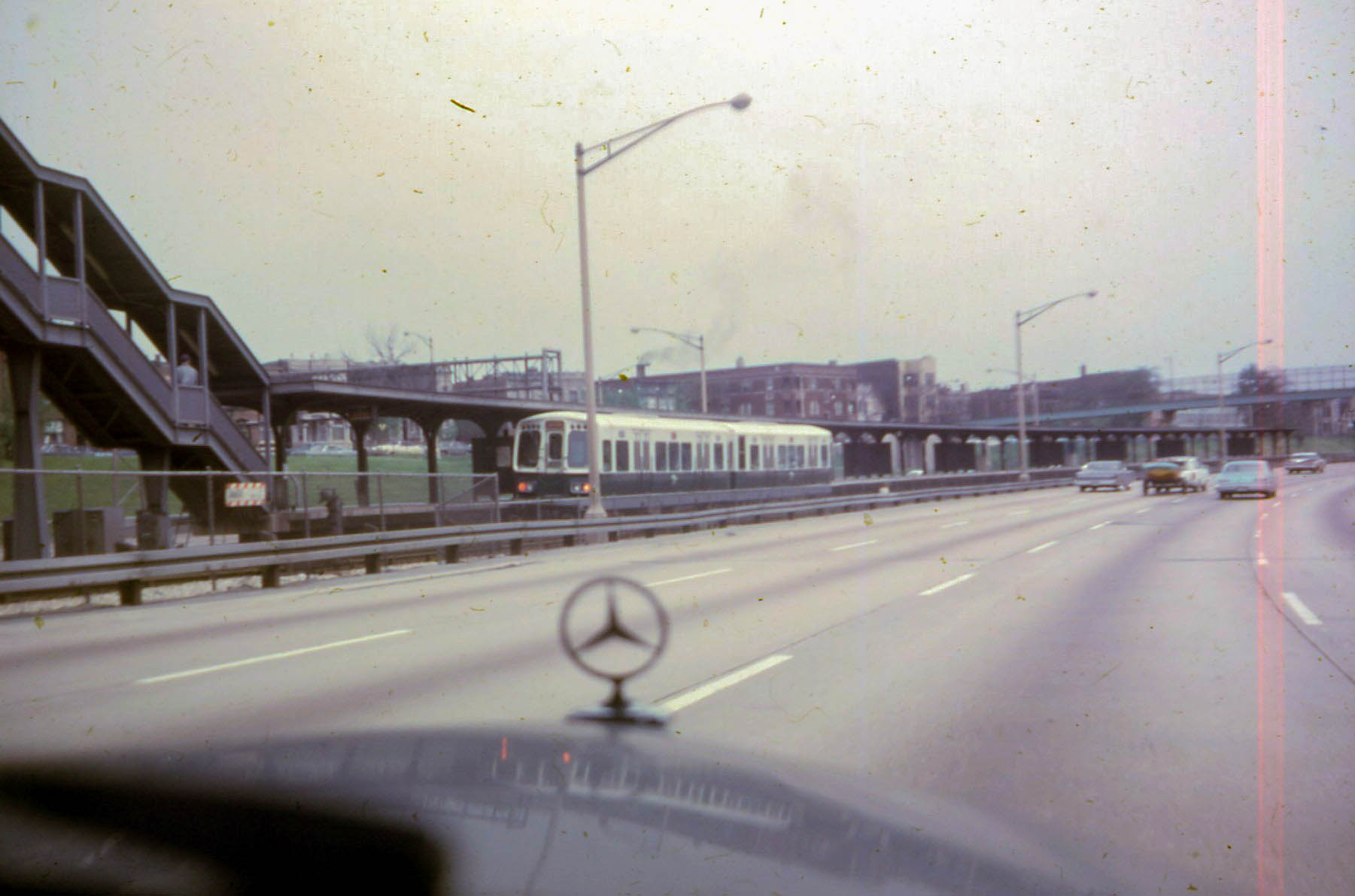
The station in June 1967

Like the other Congress Line stations, Kostner consisted of a station house on the east side of Kostner Avenue overpass and an island platform in the median of the Eisenhower Expressway. Where Kostner differed from the other stations, though, was in its size and design due to its expected low ridership and late addition to the system. The station house was typical of Congress Line stations, but it was more modest in size. It had one agent's booth, one entrance turnstile, and one exit turnstile. The station house was 32 feet (9.8 m) long and 17 feet (5.2 m) wide, less than the standard 42 feet (13 m) by 17 feet (5.2 m). The platform, however, was 600 feet (180 m), the standard length on the Congress Line. Kostner also did not have ramps to the platform like most Congress Line stations; instead, it had a single staircase.

Since Kostner was never intended to be part of the Congress Line, the CTA put a curve in the tracks at the station site. This curve caused the Kostner platform to be curved, which created visibility issues for operators. To aid the operators, a series of mirrors was installed along the station. A canopy covered the entire platform, and eight windbreaks also provided shelter. The CTA removed signage from the platform when Kostner closed, but it is otherwise intact. The station house is now boarded up and fenced off, but it is also intact.

== See also ==
- California station (CTA Congress Line)
- Central station (CTA Congress Line)
