= St. Louis station (CTA Garfield Park branch) =

Rapid transit station in Chicago, 1895–1958

ST. LOUIS 3500W 600S
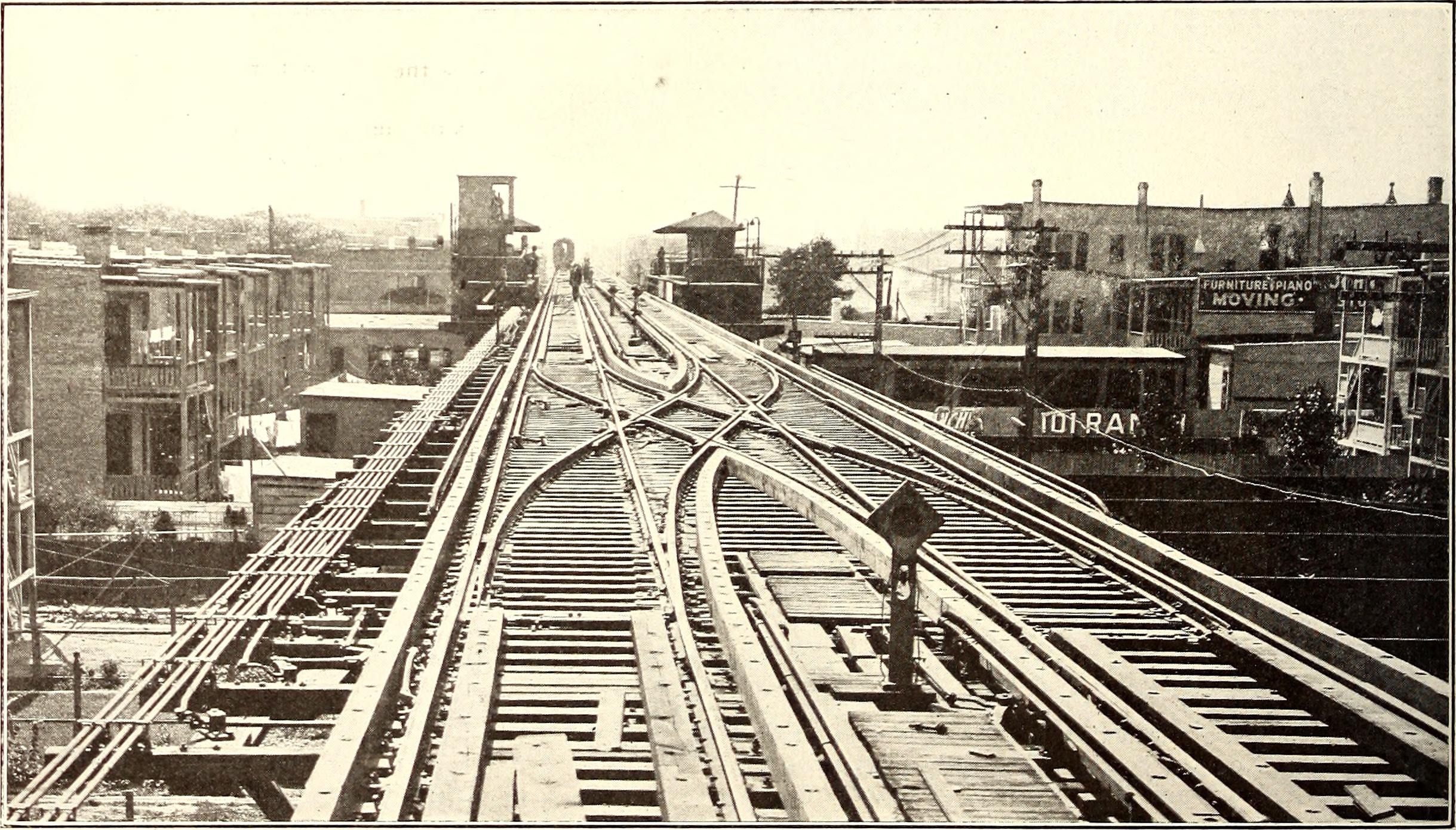
- A westward look at St. Louis in 1911

General information
- Location: 614 South St. Louis Avenue; Chicago, Illinois
- Coordinates: 41.87311°N 87.71281°W
- Owner: Chicago Transit Authority (1947–1953); Chicago Rapid Transit Company (1924–1947); See text before 1924
- Line: Garfield Park branch
- Platforms: 2 side platforms
- Tracks: 2

Construction
- Structure type: Elevated

History
- Opened: June 19, 1895
- Closed: 1958
- Rebuilt: 1911 (interlockings installed)

Passengers
- 1948: 497,085 ▼13.77% (CTA)
- Rank: 95 out of 223

Former services
Preceding station	Chicago "L"	Following station
Garfield Park toward Des Plaines	Garfield Park branch	Kedzie toward Marshfield
Location

St. Louis was a rapid transit station on the Chicago "L" between 1895 and 1953. It was constructed by the Metropolitan West Side Elevated Railroad and served its Garfield Park branch. The Chicago Aurora and Elgin Railroad (CA&E), an interurban serving Chicago's western suburbs, also used the Garfield Park branch's tracks in 1905. To accommodate the mixing of the fast interurban and slow "L" service on a two-track line, two crossovers were installed on either side of the St. Louis station to let CA&E trains pass "L" trains in 1911.

== History ==
The Metropolitan West Side Elevated Railroad Company was granted a 50-year franchise by the Chicago City Council on April 7, 1892, and began securing right of way shortly thereafter. As designed, the Metropolitan's operations comprised a main line that went westward from downtown to diverge into three branches – one northwest to Logan Square, one due west to Garfield Park, and one southwest to Douglas Park – and serve various parts of Chicago's west side. The Garfield Park branch opened on June 19, 1895.

The Metropolitan's lines were originally operated by the West Side Construction Company, which had been responsible for constructing them, and would be transferred to the Metropolitan on October 6, 1896. The backers and officers of the two companies were largely identical, however, so this transfer of ownership was nominal. The expenses incurred in constructing the Metropolitan's vast trackage would catch up to the company, which entered receivership in 1897; the similarly named Metropolitan West Side Elevated Railway Company was organized in January 1899 and assumed operations on February 3 of that year.

The interurban Aurora Elgin and Chicago Railway (AE&C) opened in 1902 and began using the Garfield Park branch in 1905.

Trains for the AE&C overtook "L" trains at Marshfield Junction, but were so fast that they caught up with other "L" trains around St. Louis. Originally, they were compelled to follow these trains at low speed for the next two miles (3.2 km) to 52nd Avenue, or the same distance to Marshfield for eastbound trains. This proved unsatisfactory, so a series of diamond interlockings, two at either side of the station, were installed to allow AE&C trains to directly pass "L" trains at the station. These interlockings were built by the Metropolitan, and were opened by August 1911.

The Metropolitan, along with the other companies operating "L" lines in Chicago, became a part of the Chicago Elevated Railways (CER) trust on July 1, 1911. CER acted as a de facto holding company for the "L" – unifying its operations, instituting the same management across the companies, and instituting free transfers between the lines starting in 1913 – but kept the underlying companies intact. This continued until the companies were formally merged into the single Chicago Rapid Transit Company (CRT), which assumed operations on January 9, 1924; the former Metropolitan was designated the Metropolitan Division of the CRT for administrative purposes. Although municipal ownership of transit had been a hotly-contested issue for half a century, the publicly owned Chicago Transit Authority (CTA) would not be created until 1945, or assume operation of the "L" until October 1, 1947.

The AE&C went bankrupt in 1919 and was split into the Chicago Aurora and Elgin Railroad (CA&E) in 1921. The station closed in 1958 as it was replaced by the Congress Line.

== Station details ==
The station was located at 614 South St. Louis Avenue. With the installation of the interlockings, a tower was placed on the eastern half of the southern, eastbound platform. The interlockings themselves were mechanical and had number 7 frogs.

=== Ridership ===
The Garfield Park branch last recorded individual station ridership statistics in 1948. In that year, St. Louis served 497,085 passengers, a 13.77 percent decline from the 576,453 passengers it had served in 1947. Its 1948 performance made it the 95th-most ridden of the 223 "L" stations that were at least partially-staffed at the beginning of the year, whereas in 1947 it had been the 87th-busiest of 222 such stations. (Note: Several stations on the Niles Center and Westchester branches were permanently unstaffed and thus did not collect ridership statistics. Several stations closed on the "L" during 1948. Exchange station on the Stock Yards branch discontinued statistics after 1946, but adjacent Racine station began collecting them in 1948.)

== Works cited ==
- "The Metropolitan West Side Elevated Railroad of Chicago". The Street Railway Review. 5: 263–274. January 15, 1895.
- "Development of the Aurora, Elgin & Chicago Railroad". The Electric Railway Journal. 38 (6). New York: McGraw Publishing Company: 220–228. August 5, 1911 – via Internet Archive.
- CTA Rail Entrance, Annual Traffic, 1900–1979 (Report). Chicago: Chicago Transit Authority. October 1, 1979.
- Moffat, Bruce G. (1995). The "L": The Development of Chicago's Rapid Transit System, 1888–1932. Chicago: Central Electric Railfans' Association. ISBN 0-915348-30-6.
- "R. L. Polk & Co.'s Chicago Street and Avenue Guide" (PDF). Polk's Chicago Directory 1923. Chicago: R. L. Polk & Co. 1923. pp. 193–228 – via ChicagoAncestors.org.
- Weller, Peter; Stark, Fred (1999). The Living Legacy of the Chicago Aurora and Elgin. San Francisco: Forum Press. ISBN 0-945213-41-7 – via Internet Archive.
