= Metropolitan Elevated Railway =

The Metropolitan Elevated Railway can refer to one of:

- The IRT Sixth Avenue Line, a former elevated railway in New York City, or
- The Metropolitan West Side Elevated Railroad, a former elevated railway in Chicago that was ancestral to the modern-day Blue Line and Pink Line
