= Harlem station (CTA Blue Line Forest Park branch) =

Chicago "L" station

Harlem 7200W 700S
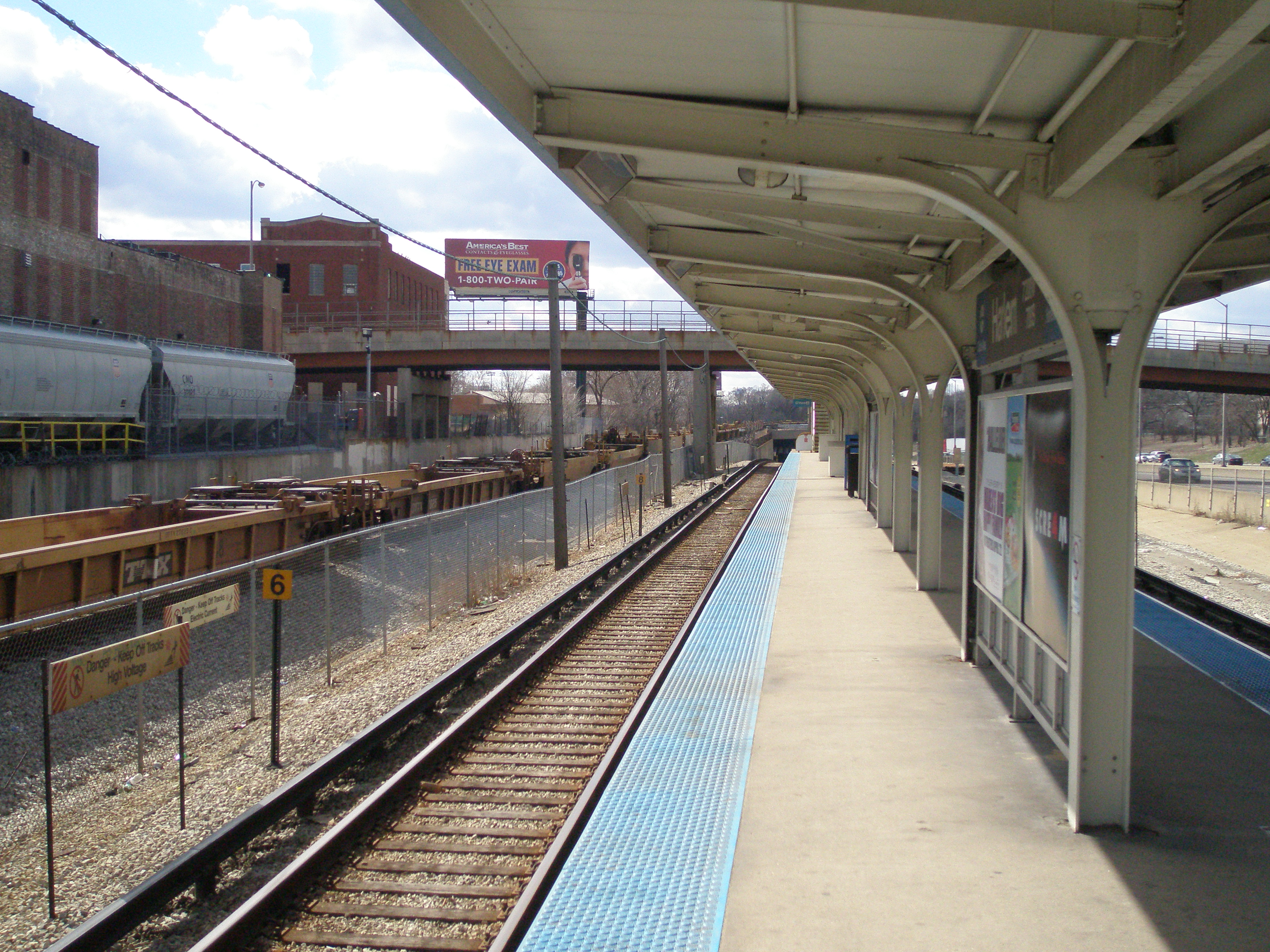
- Looking down the platform. The tracks to the left belong to the Baltimore and Ohio Chicago Terminal Railroad with a pair of hopper cars at the Ferrara Candy Company also to the left.

General information
- Location: 701 South Harlem Avenue; Forest Park, Illinois 60130
- Coordinates: 41.87349°N 87.806961°W
- Owner: Chicago Transit Authority
- Line: Forest Park Branch
- Platforms: 1 island platform
- Tracks: 2

Construction
- Structure type: Expressway median
- Accessible: No

History
- Opened: March 20, 1960; 66 years ago

Passengers
- 2025: 119,206 ▼2.4%

Services
Preceding station	Chicago "L"	Following station
Forest Park Terminus	Blue Line	Oak Park toward O'Hare
Former services
Preceding station	Chicago "L"	Following station
Hannah toward Des Plaines	Garfield Park branch	Home toward Marshfield
Preceding station	Chicago Terminal Transfer Railroad	Following station
Forest Home toward Thatcher's Park	Chicago & Northern Pacific – Main Line	Kirwin toward Chicago
Track layout
Location

Harlem is a station on the 'L' system, serving the Blue Line's Forest Park branch in Forest Park, Illinois. The station was built with an auxiliary entrance at Circle Avenue that was eventually converted to a single turnstile facility. The Circle Avenue entrance reopened as an auxiliary entrance/exit on September 26, 2009, at 4 PM. To the south of the station is the Ferrara Candy Company (formerly Ferrara Pan; the "Pan" part of the name was dropped in 2012.) A Roos chest-making factory (founded in 1871) was located west of the station and Circle Avenue until it was torn down in 2013 to make way for a new recreation park that opened there in 2018. The Roos company closed for good in 1951.

Harlem opened in 1960 and is composed of a main entrance on Harlem Avenue and an auxiliary entrance on Circle Avenue, providing access to the station's platform. Harlem is open 24/7 365 days a year as part of the overnight service of the Blue Line and an annual total of 346,005 passengers have boarded the station in 2012. The station is not to be confused with the Blue Line's other station on Harlem Avenue that is located on the Kennedy Expressway portion of the line.

== History ==
=== Wisconsin Avenue station (AE&C, 1902–1905) ===
The Aurora Elgin and Chicago Railway (AE&C) began service on August 25, 1902, and opened a station on Wisconsin Avenue by October. The Garfield Park branch, opened by the Metropolitan West Side Elevated Railroad in 1895, abutted the AE&C's line and took over local service in the area on March 11, 1905. Rather than continue using the Wisconsin Avenue station, the Metropolitan decided to open two stations in the vicinity, one at Harlem and the other at Home Avenue.

=== Garfield Park station (1905–1958) ===
The Garfield Park branch continued until it was replaced by the Congress Line in 1958.

=== Blue Line station (1960–present) ===
The current Blue Line Harlem station opened in 1960.

== Bus Connections ==
Pace

- 307 Harlem

== See also ==
- Harlem (CTA Blue Line O'Hare branch station)
- Harlem (CTA Green Line station)
