= Garfield Park branch =

Segment of the Chicago "L" (1895–1958)

Garfield Park Branch
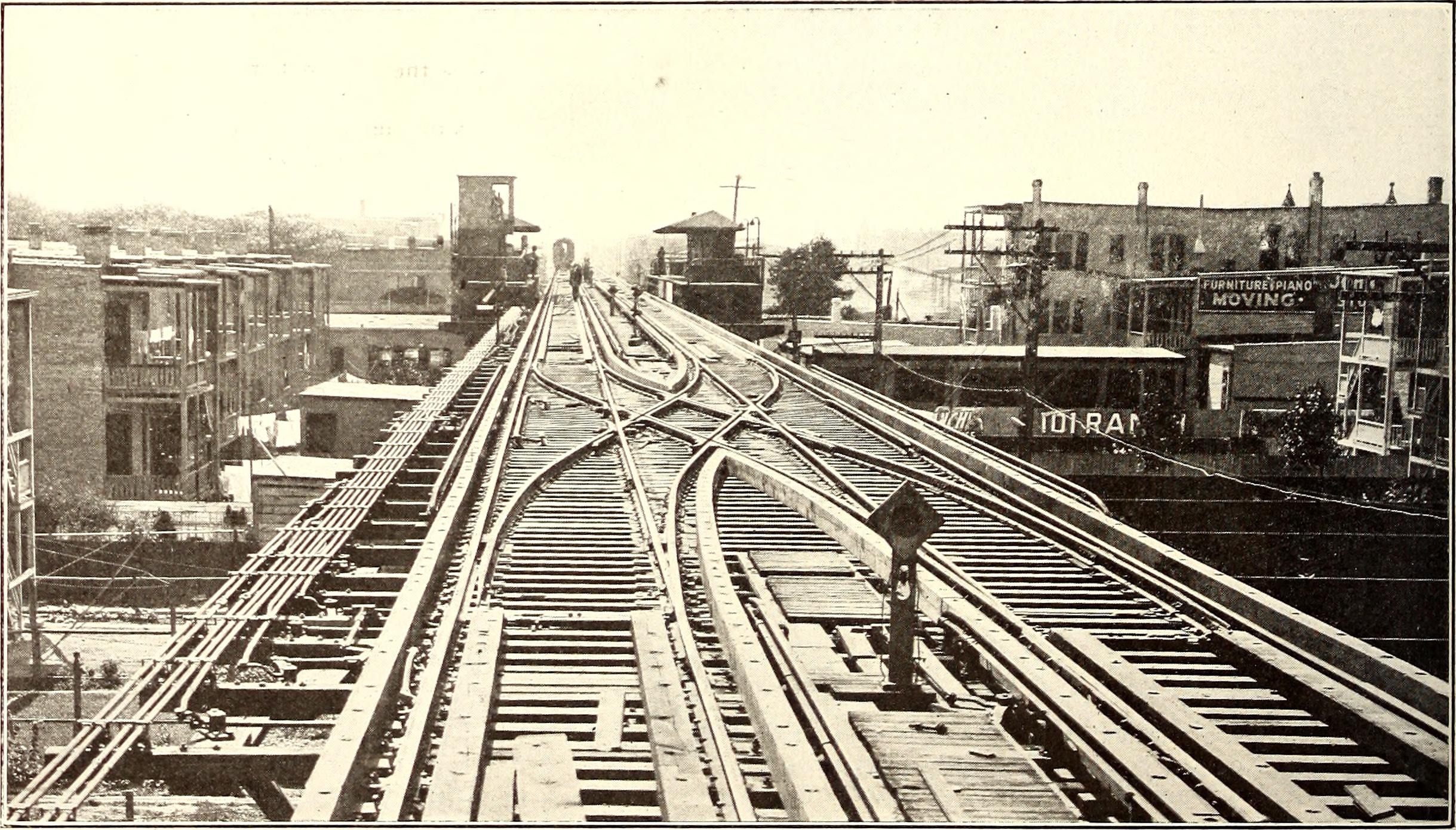
- Garfield Park branch at St. Louis station

Overview
- Status: Closed
- Locale: Chicago, Illinois, U.S. Oak Park, Illinois; Forest Park, Illinois
- Termini: Ogden; Des Plaines
- Stations: 22

Service
- Type: Rapid transit
- System: Chicago "L"
- Operator(s): Chicago Transit Authority (1947–1958); Chicago Rapid Transit Company (1924–1947); Metropolitan West Side Elevated Railroad (1895–1924)

History
- Opened: June 19, 1895
- Closed: June 22, 1958

Technical
- Track length: 4 ft 8 1/2 in (1,435 mm) standard gauge
- Electrification: Third rail, 600 V DC
Route map
Garfield Park branch highlighted in gray

The Garfield Park Branch was a rapid transit line which was part of the Chicago "L" system from 1895 to 1958. The branch served Chicago's Near West Side, East Garfield Park, West Garfield Park, and Austin neighborhoods, and the suburbs of Oak Park, and Forest Park, and consisted of twenty-two stations. It opened on June 19, 1895 and closed on June 22, 1958, when it was replaced by the Congress branch of the Blue Line.

== Operations ==
The Garfield Park branch divided from the Metropolitan Main Line at the Marshfield Junction, just west of the Marshfield station. Initially the line only extended as far west as 48th Avenue (Cicero Avenue). On August 25, 1902, the Garfield Park branch was extended to 52nd Avenue (Laramie Avenue), and on March 11, 1905, service was extended to Des Plaines Avenue in Forest Park. On October 1, 1926, the Westchester branch was added, providing service from the Des Plaines Avenue stop to Roosevelt Road in Westchester.

== History ==
The Metropolitan West Side Elevated Railroad began service in 1895, as the third elevated railway company in Chicago (after the South Side Elevated Railroad and the Lake Street Elevated). The Met was the largest elevated operation to date, with 4 branches leading to Chicago's West Side (and suburbs further west after that) connecting to a downtown trunk line. It was also the first electrified elevated railroad (the South Side and Lake used small steam engines). Most trains headed to the Loop, but as the Loop was often over-capacity during rush hour, a new terminal at Fifth Avenue/Wells Street was used.

The line mostly operated concurrently with the Chicago Aurora and Elgin Railroad (CA&E), who started sharing tracks with the Met Elevated in 1902. The interurban trains all terminated at Wells Street; no CA&E trains ever traveled around the Loop.

In the early years, the line expanded greatly, following the route taken by the CA&E; while the Garfield originally only extended to 48th Avenue, the line was soon extended to 52nd Ave/Laramie, and finally to Des Plaines Avenue; the Westchester branch was added in 1926, but it was really just a transfer of local service between CA&E and the Chicago Rapid Transit Company.

=== Replacement ===
Even when the Met was being built, there were plans for a large boulevard on the West side of Chicago. In the 1920s and 1930s, as Chicago city planners started designing future superhighways, it became obvious that one of the best routes for a future high traffic East-West superhighway was through what was then known as Congress Street. Chicago's future transit plans were also intertwined with Chicago's plans for highways; a No.2 subway was to run under Milwaukee Avenue and Dearborn Street, turning westward under Congress Parkway and connecting to an elevated line on the expressway median heading to the West side suburbs. This line opened in 1951 as the Milwaukee–Dearborn subway and connected to the Logan Square Branch, rerouting traffic away from the Metropolitan Main Line and partially replacing it; Garfield and Douglas trains still followed the Met into the Loop.

The second part of the project was the Congress Expressway, which would have a "L" line running through its median; many parts of the new expressway were to be built directly in the Garfield Park right-of-way, requiring demolition of a large portion of the line. A set of temporary tracks were placed slightly north of the right-of-way to allow for construction to continue on the Congress Expressway and the construction of temporary stations at Des Plaines Avenue and Ridgeland Ave.

By 1955, while the Garfield and Met Main were still a major part of the "L" system, the vast majority of the stations on the line had already been closed and demolished; the Westchester branch was abandoned 4 years earlier, ending CTA train service west of Des Plaines. Initially, some of the previously closed stations were served by the CA&E after CTA ended service, but the interurban, already financially bleeding due to the rise of the automobile, ended service to downtown Chicago on September 20, 1953 due to the new temporary track routing - terminating at Des Plaines, where a CTA transfer was required to continue further downtown. Commuters, favoring a direct route offered by the Chicago & North Western to downtown instead of an inconvenient two fare two-way transfer, rapidly abandoned the CA&E in droves, causing the CA&E to shut down abruptly at noon on July 3, 1957, stranding riders.

The brand new Congress Branch opened on June 22, 1958 and connected to the Milwaukee–Dearborn subway, replacing and closing down the last remnants of the old Garfield Park and Metropolitan Main Line.

=== Legacy ===
While the Congress Line opened in the summer of 1958, the permanent right of way was only finished from Austin to Halsted; permanent infrastructure was not finished to Des Plaines until spring 1960. After being somewhat split apart into several different lines due to construction, the remnants and successors of the Metropolitan West Side Elevated Railroad were combined into one line once again as the Logan Square branch, the oldest part of the Met, was routed to downtown through the Milwaukee–Dearborn subway, splitting off into the Congress and Douglas branches depending on train. The new line, the Milwaukee-Congress-Douglas, was rapidly expanded further north from the original terminus of the Logan Square branch; 10 years after the final Congress tracks were laid down, the new line was extended to Jefferson Park in February 1970. In March 1980, construction of the final extension to O'Hare station began, with the final section opening in September 1984. In 1993, the line was color-coded and became the Blue Line.

The Metropolitan Main Line and the Garfield Park Line were the only branches that the CTA had ever replaced completely wholesale on the same right of way (many replacement stations on the Congress Line are parallel in location to their former Garfield/Met counterparts; some, like UIC-Halsted, were built directly next to the older station, to the point where period photos often show the old and new stations side by side.) This means that very little of the original Garfield Line remains, as demolition of the old line was extremely rapid and small parts such as signage were tossed into the scrap pile. The only surviving station of the Garfield branch, now known as Forest Park, was completely rebuilt several times. The Franklin Street Substation at the original location of the Wells Street Terminal remains as the only standing structure from the Metropolitan Main Line.

== Station listing ==
Garfield Park branch stations
Station	Notes
Ogden	Closed September 27, 1953; demolished; Replaced by Illinois Medical District
Hoyne	Closed September 27, 1953; demolished
Western	Closed September 27, 1953; demolished; Replaced by Western
California	Closed September 27, 1953; demolished; Replaced by California, abandoned
Sacramento	Closed June 10, 1952; demolished, due to a fire in head house
Kedzie	Replaced by Kedzie–Homan; also served by the CA&E
St. Louis	demolished
Garfield Park	Closed September 20, 1953; demolished. Originally called Garfield
Pulaski	Originally called Crawford; Replaced by Pulaski
Tripp	Originally called Medora
Kilbourn	Closed September 20, 1953; demolished. Originally called West Forty Fifth and later Kral.
Cicero	Originally called West Forty Eighth; Replaced by Cicero
Laramie	Originally called 52nd Avenue Terminal; also served by the CA&E
Central	Originally served by the Aurora Elgin and Chicago Railway: Replaced by Central, abandoned
Austin	Originally served by the Aurora Elgin and Chicago Railway; Replaced by Austin
Lombard	Closed September 20, 1953; demolished. Originally served by the Aurora Elgin and Chicago Railway; Replaced by Austin
Ridgeland	Temporary station during construction of Congress line.
Gunderson	demolished
Oak Park	Replaced by Oak Park; also served by the CA&E
Home	Closed September 20, 1953; demolished
Harlem	Replaced by Harlem
Hannah	Closed September 14, 1952; demolished. Originally served by the Aurora Elgin and Chicago Railway; Replaced by Harlem
Des Plaines	Originally served by the Aurora Elgin and Chicago Railway

== See also ==
- Blue Line (CTA)
- Metropolitan Main Line (CTA)
