= Oak Park station (CTA Blue Line) =

Chicago "L" station

Oak Park 800W 900S
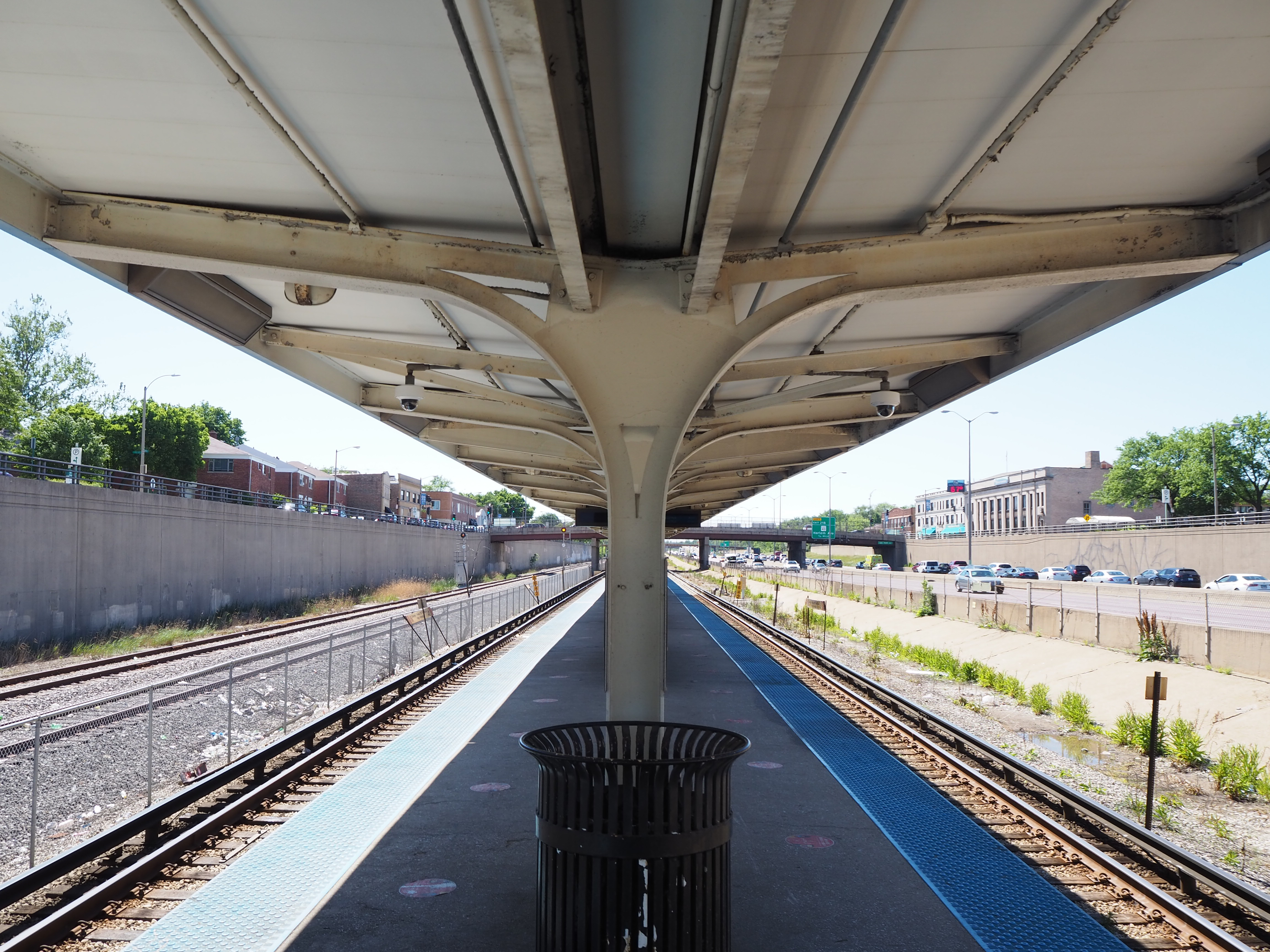

General information
- Location: 950 South Oak Park Avenue; Oak Park, Illinois 60304
- Coordinates: 41.872108°N 87.791602°W
- Owner: Chicago Transit Authority
- Line: Forest Park branch
- Platforms: 1 island platform
- Tracks: 2

Construction
- Structure type: Expressway median
- Accessible: No

History
- Opened: March 20, 1960; 66 years ago
- Former names: Kirwin (Note: A passenger station along the Chicago Terminal Transfer Railroad previously existed at this location)

Passengers
- 2025: 179,081 ▲5.2%

Services
Preceding station	Chicago "L"	Following station
Harlem toward Forest Park	Blue Line	Austin toward O'Hare
Former services
Preceding station	Chicago "L"	Following station
Home toward Des Plaines	Garfield Park branch	Gunderson toward Marshfield
Preceding station	Chicago Aurora and Elgin Railroad	Following station
Forest Park toward Wheaton	Main Line	Laramie Avenue One-way operation
Preceding station	Chicago Terminal Transfer Railroad	Following station
South Oak Park toward Thatcher's Park	Chicago & Northern Pacific – Main Line	South Ridgeland toward Chicago
Track layout
Location

Oak Park is a station on the Chicago 'L' system, serving the Blue Line's Forest Park branch and Oak Park, Illinois. The station is alongside the Eisenhower Expressway between Oak Park Avenue and East Avenue, near the Oak Park Conservatory. The auxiliary entrance on East Avenue is half a block from the Oak Park Conservatory.

== History ==
=== Chicago Terminal Transfer (1893–1902) ===
The Chicago Terminal Transfer Railroad had a "Kirwin" station at this site as early as 1893.

=== AE&C (1902–1905) ===
The interurban Aurora Elgin and Chicago Railway (AE&C) began service on August 5, 1902, and included a station on Oak Park Avenue.

=== Garfield Park "L" (1905–1958) ===
The Garfield Park branch, operated by the Metropolitan West Side Elevated Railroad since 1895, abutted the AE&C at 52nd Avenue; on March 11, 1905, the branch assumed local service west to Des Plaines Avenue in exchange for the AE&C going downtown. The AE&C and its successor, the Chicago Aurora and Elgin Railroad (CA&E), continued to maintain westbound-only express service at Oak Park.

=== Blue Line (1960–present) ===
The current station opened as part of the Congress Line on March 20, 1960.

== Structure ==
The station consists of a single island platform to the south of the Eisenhower Expressway with an entrance at each end. The main entrance is located at the west end of the platform off of Oak Park Avenue and is connected to the platform by a long ramp. The auxiliary farecard-only entrance is located at the east end of the platform off of East Avenue and is connected to the platform via a staircase and horizontal walkway. The CSX (Baltimore & Ohio Chicago Terminal Railroad) tracks are south of the station.

== Bus connections ==
Pace

- 311 Oak Park Avenue

== Gallery ==
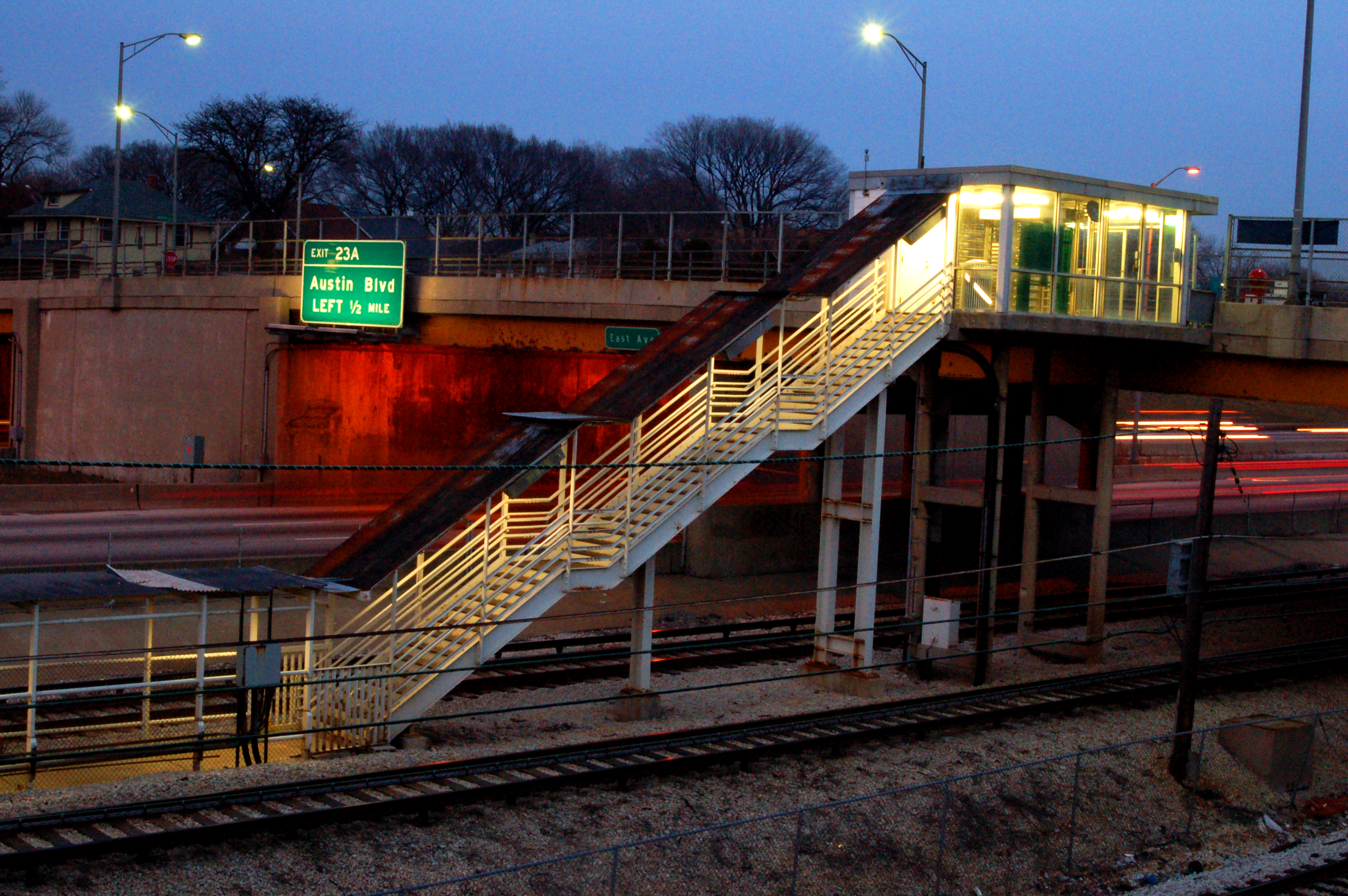
Oak Park station staircase to East Avenue.
