= Laramie station (CTA Garfield Park branch) =

Rapid transit station in Chicago, 1902–1958

LARAMIE 5200W 600S

General information
- Owner: Chicago Transit Authority (1947–1958); Chicago Rapid Transit Company (1924–1947); See text before 1924

History
- Opened: August 17, 1902
- Closed: 1958

Former services
Preceding station	Chicago "L"	Following station
Central toward Des Plaines	Garfield Park branch	Cicero toward Marshfield
Preceding station	Chicago Aurora and Elgin Railroad	Following station
Oak Park toward Wheaton	Main Line	Kedzie Avenue One-way operation

Laramie was a rapid transit station on the Chicago "L"'s Garfield Park branch, opening in 1902 and serving as the branch's terminal and connecting it with the interurban Aurora, Elgin & Chicago Railroad (AE&C). The AE&C continued downtown on the Garfield Park's trackage in 1905, whereafter it only boarded westbound passengers and alighted eastbound passengers to avoid direct competition with the "L"; as part of the same agreement, the "L" had extended west to the AE&C's station on Des Plaines Avenue. The AE&C, later renamed the Chicago Aurora and Elgin Railroad (CA&E), ceased operation in 1953, and the station closed altogether in 1958 when the Garfield Park branch was replaced with the Congress Line.

== History ==
When the Congress rapid transit line opened on June 22, 1958, the new expressway-median route initially ran only from Halsted Street to Laramie Avenue, and west of Laramie service continued over the former Garfield Park line while the new facility was still incomplete.
