= Kedzie–Homan station =

Chicago "L" station

Kedzie-Homan 3200W 530S
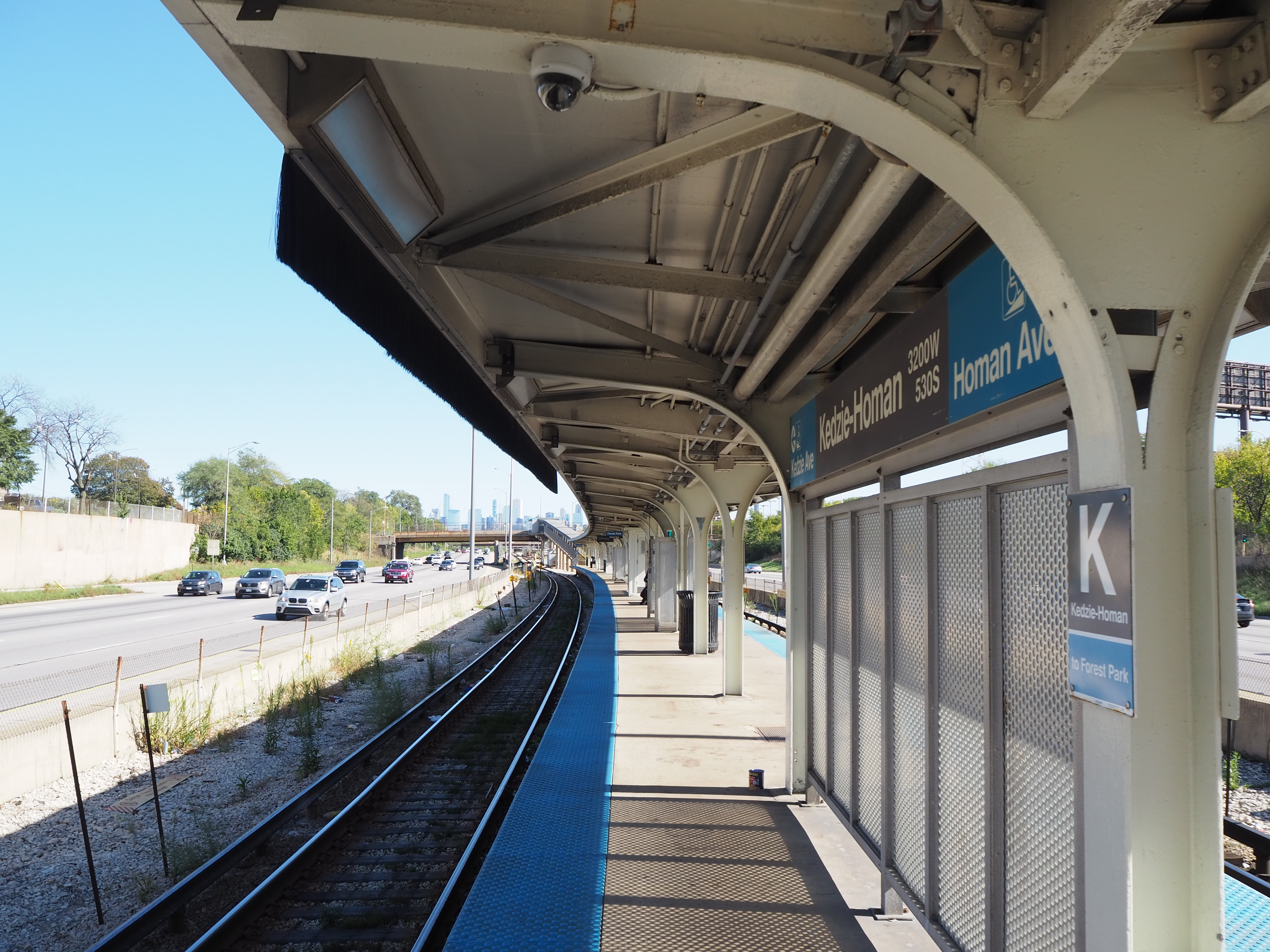
- Kedzie-Homan CTA station in October 2021

General information
- Location: 530 South Kedzie Avenue; Chicago, Illinois 60624
- Coordinates: 41.874341°N 87.70604°W
- Owner: Chicago Transit Authority
- Line: Forest Park branch
- Platforms: 1 island platform
- Tracks: 2

Construction
- Structure type: Expressway median
- Accessible: Yes

History
- Opened: June 22, 1958; 68 years ago
- Rebuilt: 2000–2001
- Former names: Kedzie

Passengers
- 2025: 269,354 ▼6.9%

Services
| Preceding station | Chicago "L" | Following station |
|---|---|---|
| Pulaski toward Forest Park | Blue Line | Western toward O'Hare |
Former services
| Preceding station | Chicago "L" | Following station |
|---|---|---|
| Pulaski toward Des Plaines | Congress branch | California Closed 1973 toward Jefferson Park |
Track layout
Location

Kedzie–Homan is an 'L' station on the CTA Blue Line's Forest Park branch. The station is located in the median of the Eisenhower Expressway and serving the East Garfield Park neighborhood and has two entrances on the Kedzie and Homan Avenue overpasses.

== History ==
=== Expressway-median station ===
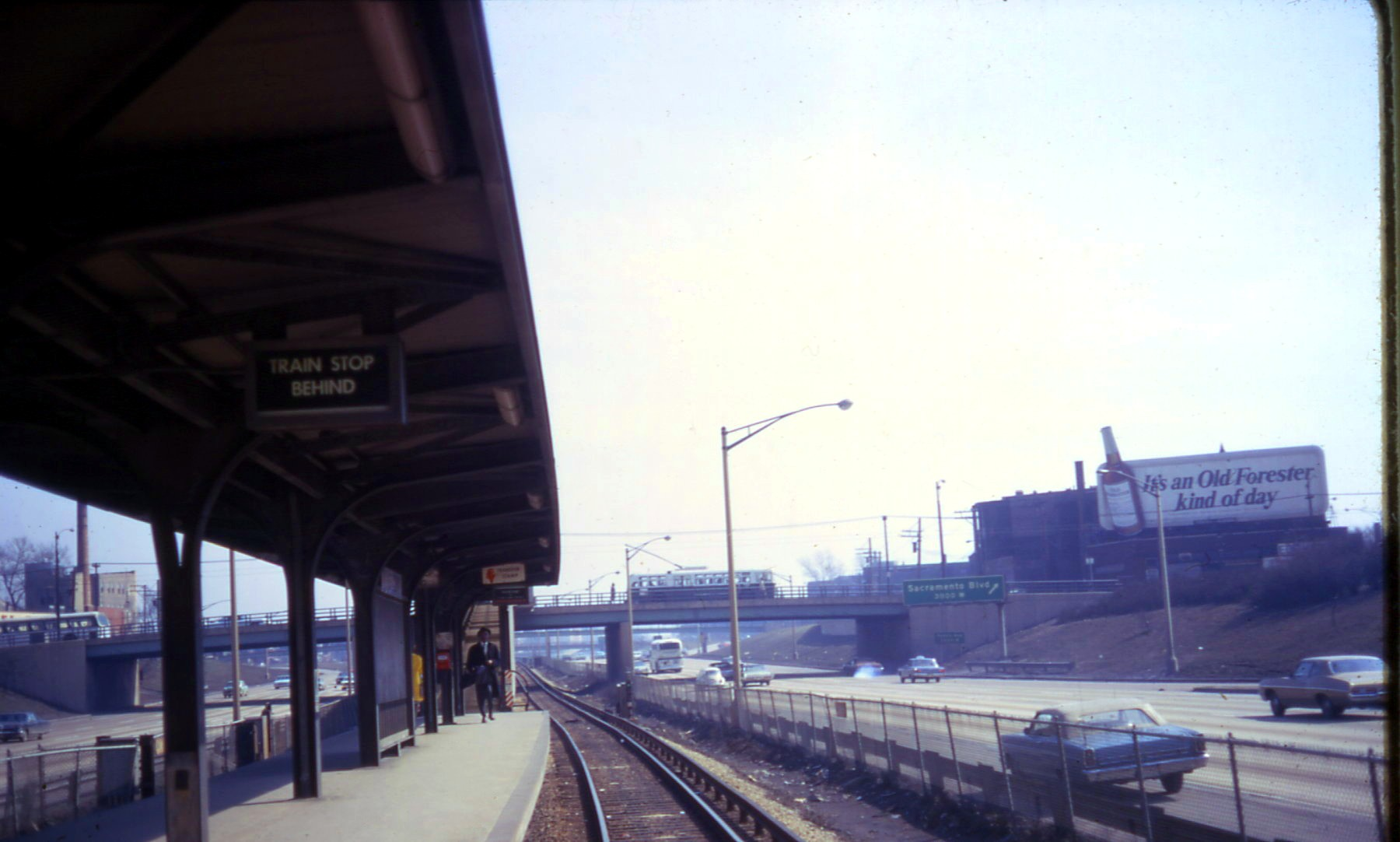
1968 view of then Kedzie 'L' station, along the median of Eisenhower Expressway. Note the trolley on the Kedzie Avenue overpass.

Kedzie–Homan was named Kedzie until the early 1990s, when the name was changed to Kedzie–Homan. However, signs on the platform still referred to the station as Kedzie until 2013, when signs with Kedzie-Homan were installed.

In 2000–2001, Kedzie–Homan was renovated with a number of improvements for $2.6 million. The improvements included making the station handicapped accessible by modifying the entrance ramps, brighter lighting, new doors, and a redesigned entryway to improve passenger flow.

== Bus connections ==
CTA

- 7 Harrison (weekdays only)
- 52 Kedzie
- 82 Kimball/Homan
