= Illinois Medical District station =

Chicago "L" station

Illinois Medical District 1830W 430S
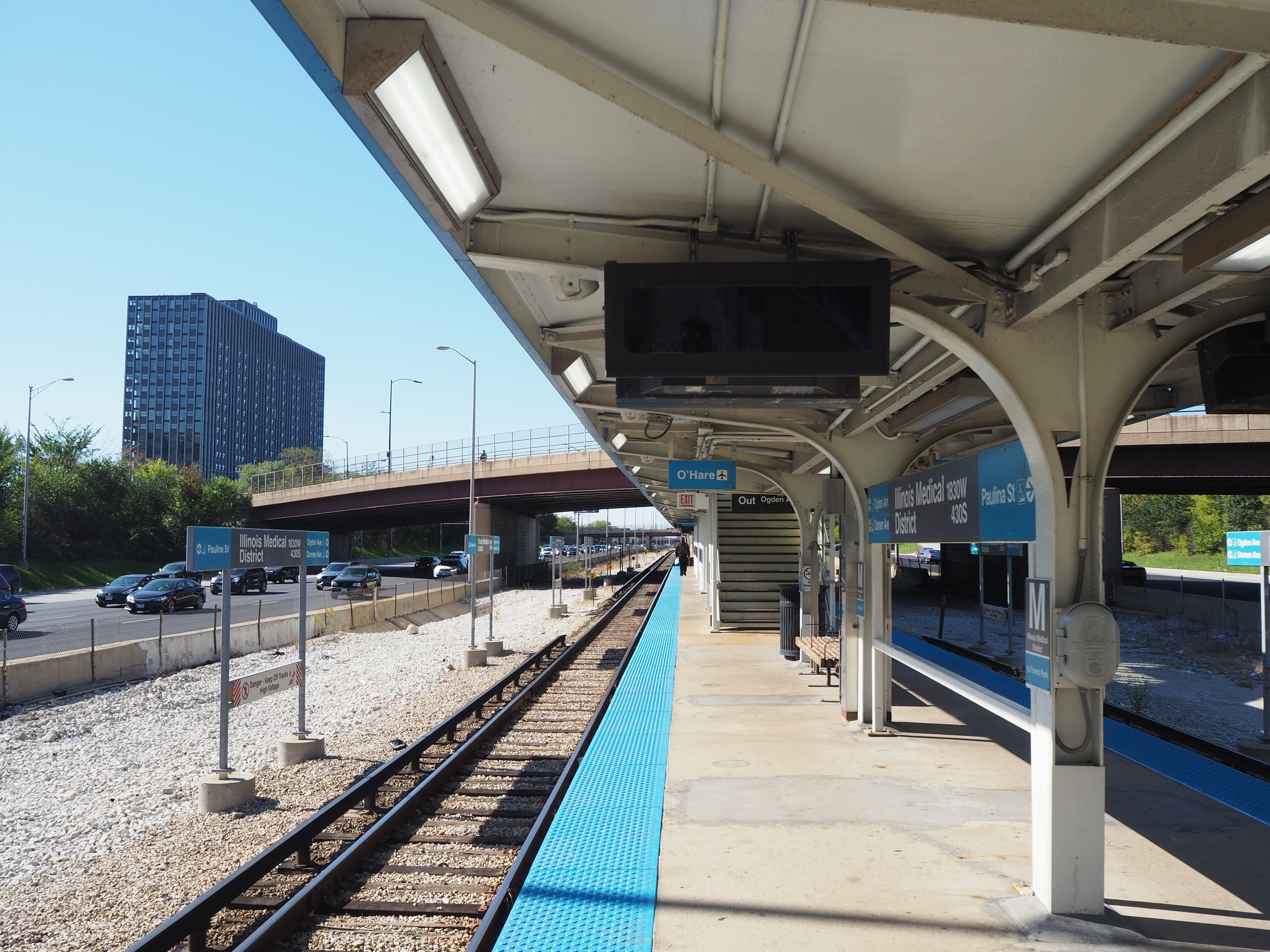

General information
- Location: 430 South Damen Avenue; Chicago, Illinois 60612
- Coordinates: 41.875706°N 87.673932°W
- Owner: Chicago Transit Authority
- Line: Forest Park Branch
- Platforms: 1 island platform
- Tracks: 2

Construction
- Structure type: Expressway median
- Accessible: Yes

History
- Opened: June 22, 1958; 68 years ago
- Rebuilt: 1998 (Damen entrance renovated); 2016–18 (station renovation)
- Former names: Medical Center (1958–2006)

Passengers
- 2025: 444,886 ▲7.6%

Services
Preceding station	Chicago "L"	Following station
Western toward Forest Park	Blue Line	Racine toward O'Hare
Track layout
Location

Illinois Medical District is a station on the Chicago Transit Authority's 'L' system, serving the Blue Line's Forest Park branch. It is located in the median of the Eisenhower Expressway. Prior to June 25, 2006, the station was known as Medical Center. As the name implies, it primarily serves the Illinois Medical District and Tri-Taylor neighborhood, but is also close to the United Center, home of the Chicago Bulls and Chicago Blackhawks sports teams. The station has three entrances; one at Damen Avenue, one at Ogden Avenue, and one at Paulina Street, a block west of Ashland Avenue.

== History ==
=== Expressway-median station ===
The $23 million project began in September 2016 and was completed on August 20, 2018.

== Bus connections ==
CTA

- 7 Harrison (weekdays only)
- 50 Damen
- 126 Jackson

Pace

- 755 Plainfield/IMD Express (weekday rush hours only)
