= Racine station (CTA Blue Line) =

Chicago "L" station

Racine 1200W 430S
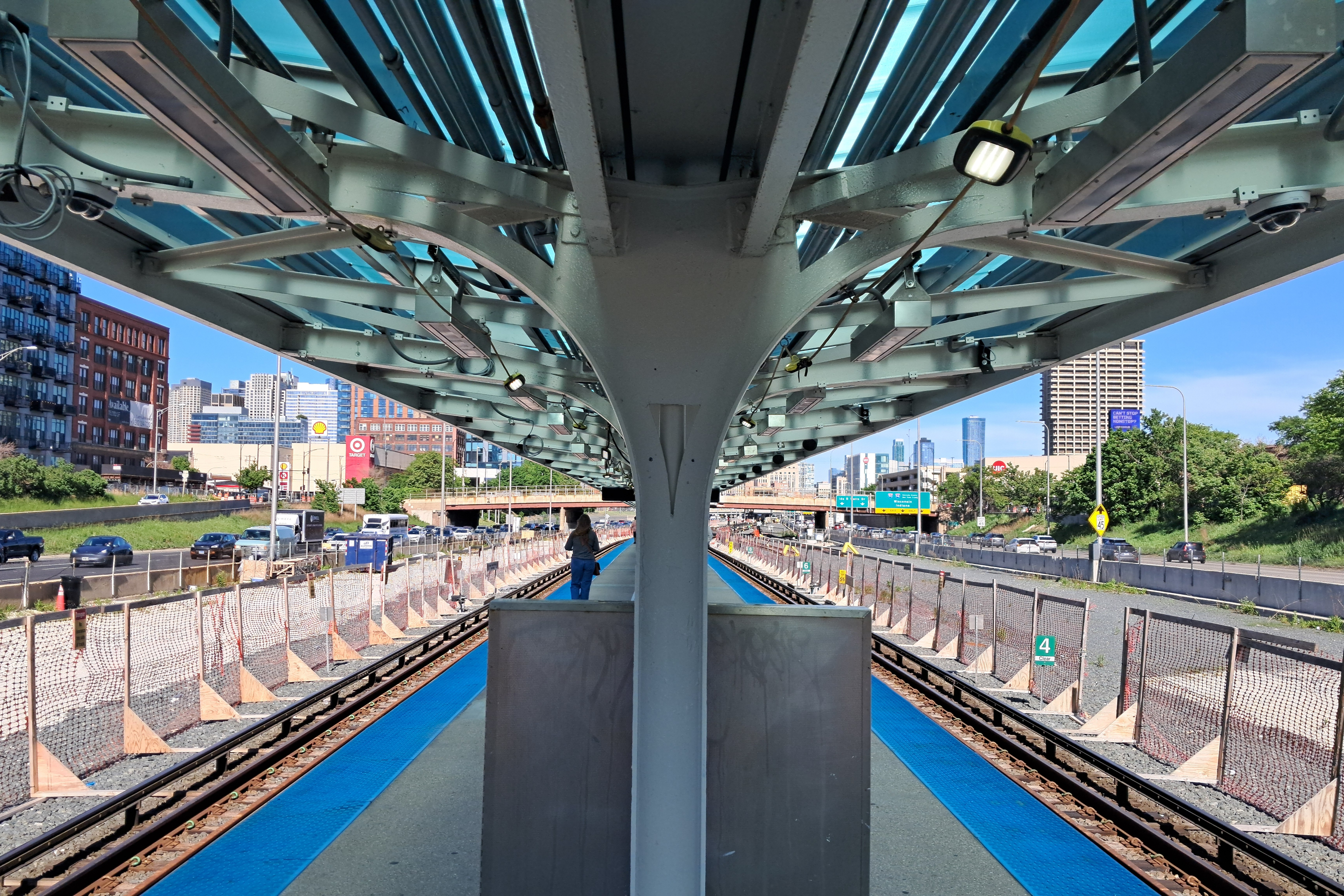

General information
- Location: 430 South Racine Avenue; Chicago, IL 60607
- Coordinates: 41.8759°N 87.6596°W
- Owner: Chicago Transit Authority
- Line: Forest Park Branch
- Platforms: 1 island platform
- Tracks: 2

Construction
- Structure type: Expressway median
- Accessible: Yes

History
- Opened: June 22, 1958; 68 years ago
- Rebuilt: 2023–2026

Passengers
- 2025: 227,671 ▲4.7%

Services
Preceding station	Chicago "L"	Following station
Illinois Medical District toward Forest Park	Blue Line	UIC–Halsted toward O'Hare
Former services
Preceding station	Chicago "L"	Following station
Polk toward 54th/Cermak	Blue Line Cermak branch	UIC–Halsted toward O'Hare
Track layout
Location

Racine is an 'L' station on the Chicago Transit Authority's Blue Line. The station serves the Near West Side neighborhood and the western end of the University of Illinois at Chicago (UIC) campus.

== History ==
=== Expressway-median station ===
The station opened on June 22, 1958, and is almost identical to every other station built in the median of the Eisenhower Expressway, including an island platform, a small station house on Racine's and Loomis's overpass containing only a ticket booth and turnstiles and a long passageway ramp connecting the two.

During the time the CTA used skip-stop services, the station was an AB stop, meaning all trains stop at this station. The station was once a transfer stop between Congress trains to Forest Park station and Douglas trains to 54th/Cermak station (A and B trains, respectively, during skip-stop service). On June 25, 2006, the Pink Line was opened, running along much of the Blue Line's Cermak branch as well as the Lake Street Elevated and the Loop Elevated; Blue Line service to 54th/Cermak was changed to weekday rush hour service. Since April 25, 2008, the Blue Line no longer serves 54th/Cermak.

==== Renovation ====
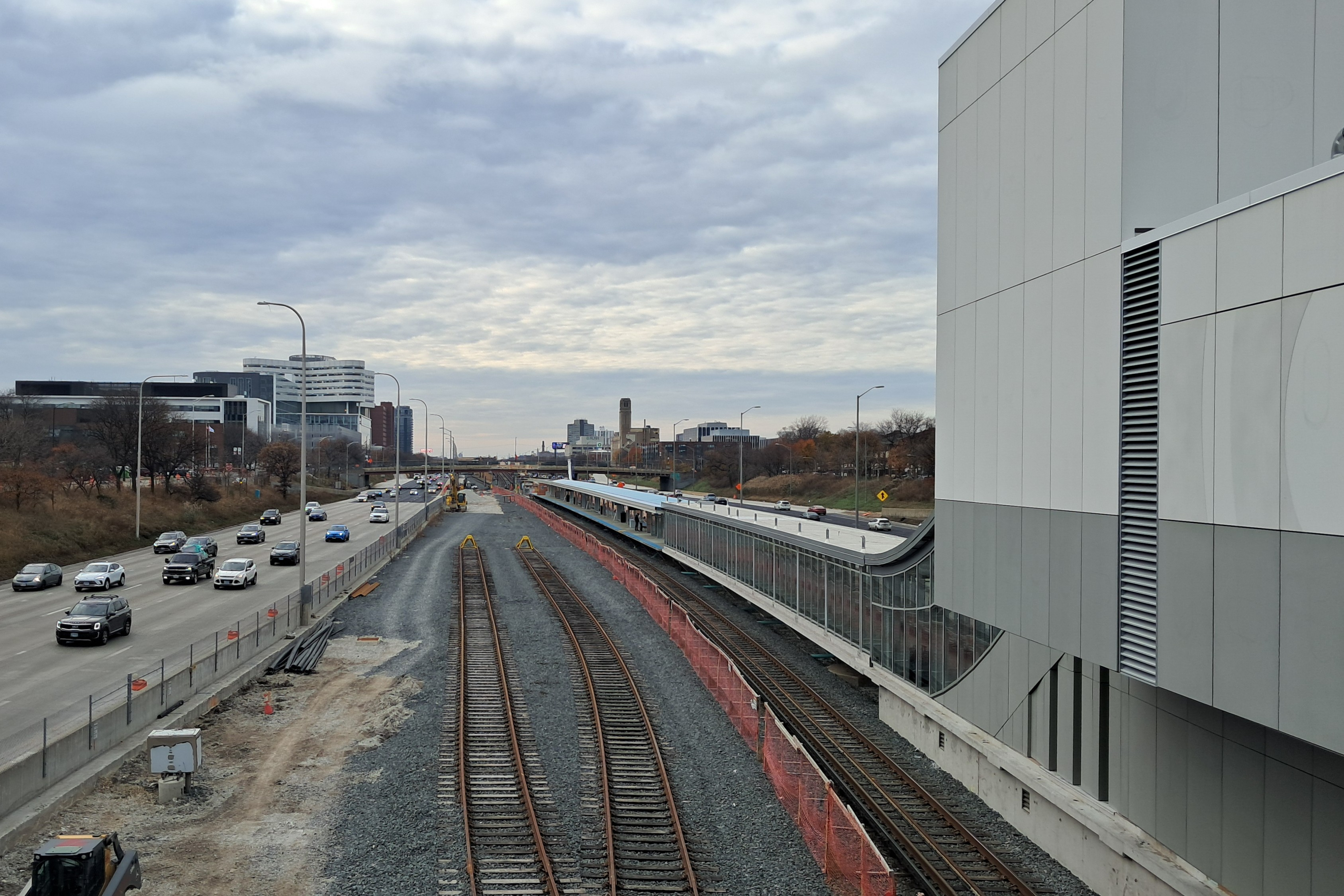
Racine station, November 2025

As part of the Forest Park Branch Rebuild project, Racine underwent a renovation lasting from July 2023 until October 2026. The station had both entrances rebuilt, new elevator installed, new stairs and an ADA-compliant ramp added, and the platform extended. The Racine station closed to allow new tracks to be built between Illinois Medical District and LaSalle, and the closure lasted until October 2023, after which the station itself and the Loomis entrance reopened to riders. The Racine entrance remained closed until October 2025 for reconstruction. After that, the Loomis entrance also closed until October 2026, at which point the station renovation was completed.

== Service ==
Racine sits at the base of the Loomis ramp, a double-tracked viaduct that rises from the expressway to join the Douglas Branch north of Polk station. Prior to April 25, 2008, the Blue Line split into two branches here. Trains to Forest Park continued west in the Eisenhower Expressway, while the other trains took the Loomis Ramp to the Douglas branch to operate to 54th/Cermak. When the Pink Line opened on June 25, 2006, Douglas Branch service on the Blue Line was reduced to running only during weekday rush hours. After April 25, 2008, the Douglas Branch service was discontinued and fully replaced by the Pink Line. Although the Loomis Ramp no longer is used for revenue service, it remains intact as the only track connection between the Blue Line and the rest of the system, allowing for non-revenue equipment moves and for Blue Line rolling stock to access the Skokie Shops. When construction or another means of traffic obstruction occurs on the Pink Line between Polk and Ashland, trains are routed via the Loomis Ramp to Racine, where they terminate.

== Location ==
The station is located at 430 South Racine Avenue and gives access to the University Village neighborhood and the western end of the UIC campus. It is in the Eisenhower Expressway median at surface level. The Loomis Street entrance to the Racine station is located near Whitney M. Young Magnet High School and Andrew Jackson Language Academy.

== Bus connections ==
CTA

- 7 Harrison (weekdays only)
- 60 Blue Island/26th (Owl Service)
- 126 Jackson

Pace

- 755 Plainfield/IMD Express (weekday rush hours only)
