= Skip-stop on the Chicago "L" =

Former Chicago "L" service pattern

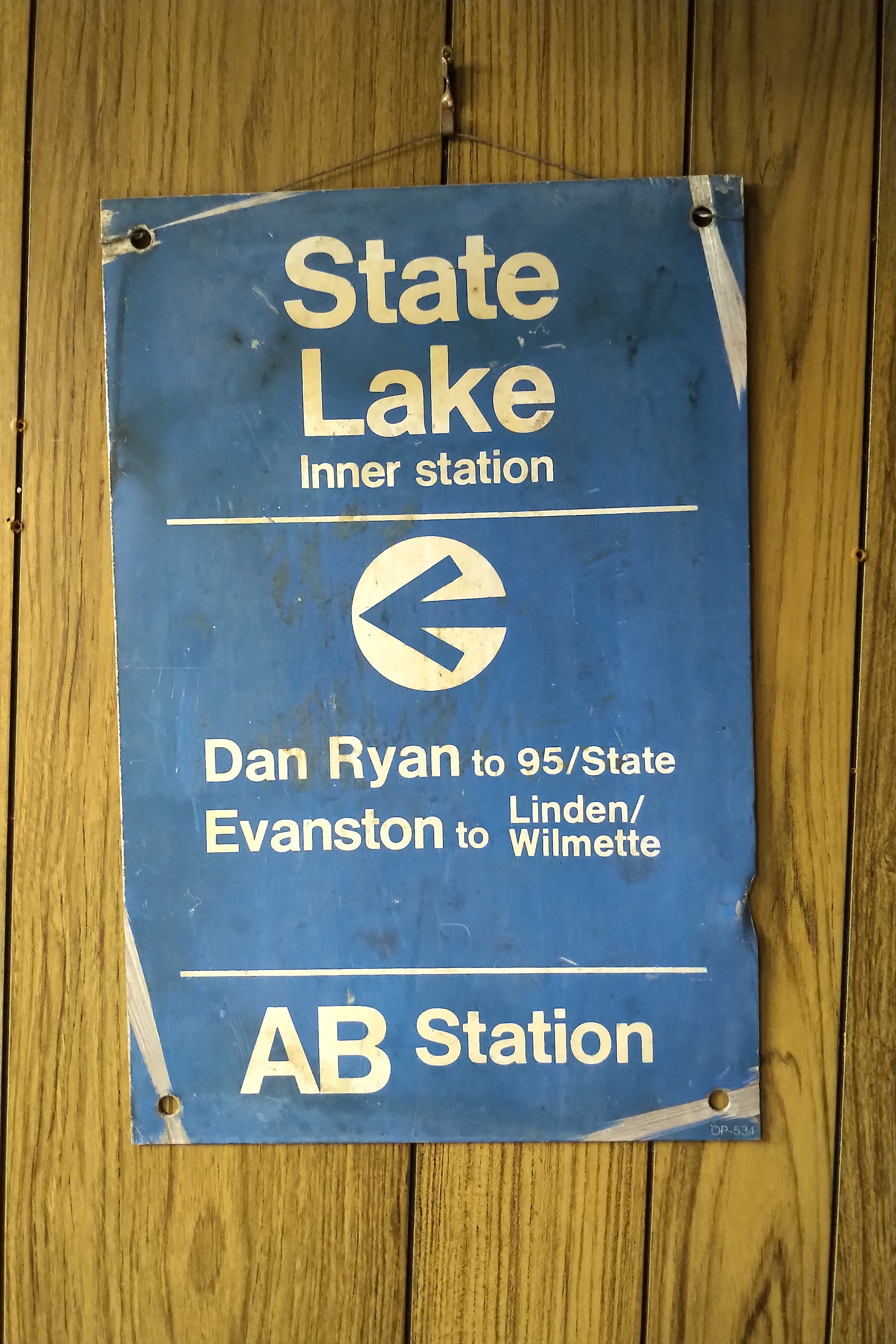
A platform sign from State/Lake during the skip-stop era, depicting it as an "AB" station, now in a private collection

The Chicago "L" used skip-stop service, wherein certain trains would stop only at certain designated stations on a route, from 1948 to 1995. It was implemented as a way to speed up travel within a route, and was one of the Chicago Transit Authority's first reforms upon its assumption of the "L"'s operations.

== Background ==
The main part of the Chicago "L" was built in stages between 1892 and 1900. Originally the purview of four private companies, those companies merged to form the Chicago Rapid Transit Company in 1924. There was very little spending on expanding rapid transit within the city from the 1910s to the 1930s. By 1936 Manhattan had more miles of rapid transit than the entire city of Chicago, despite having a tenth of the land area and a lower population.

By the 1920s, the "L" was criticized for its mismanagement, in particular Chicago's lack of a subway system in contrast to other cities such as New York and Boston. Construction of a subway was a plank of William Emmett Dever's unsuccessful campaign in the 1927 mayoral election. As late as 1936 "[a] subway for Chicago [was] still a dream." Even after the State Street Subway was finished in 1943, another one under Dearborn Street wasn't finished until a decade later, and most of Chicago's rapid transit remains above-ground.

Perhaps most indicting of the management of the "L", however, was the trains' sluggish speed. By the late 1940s, wooden cars from the 1890s were still in use throughout most of the system, and many stations were just a few blocks away from one another. The majority of "L" tracks were only double-tracked and did not allow for physical segregation of local and express services, (Note: The Lake Street Elevated and South Side Elevated (both part of the modern-day Green Line) both had a third track for unidirectional express service during rush hours, while the North Side main line (part of the modern-day Brown, Red, and Purple Lines) had a full four tracks for bidirectional local and express services, but these were the exceptions rather than the rule.) limiting the possible options for reform. When the Chicago Transit Authority assumed control of the "L" in 1947, these factors were leading to a decline in ridership, and action was felt needed.

== Implementation ==
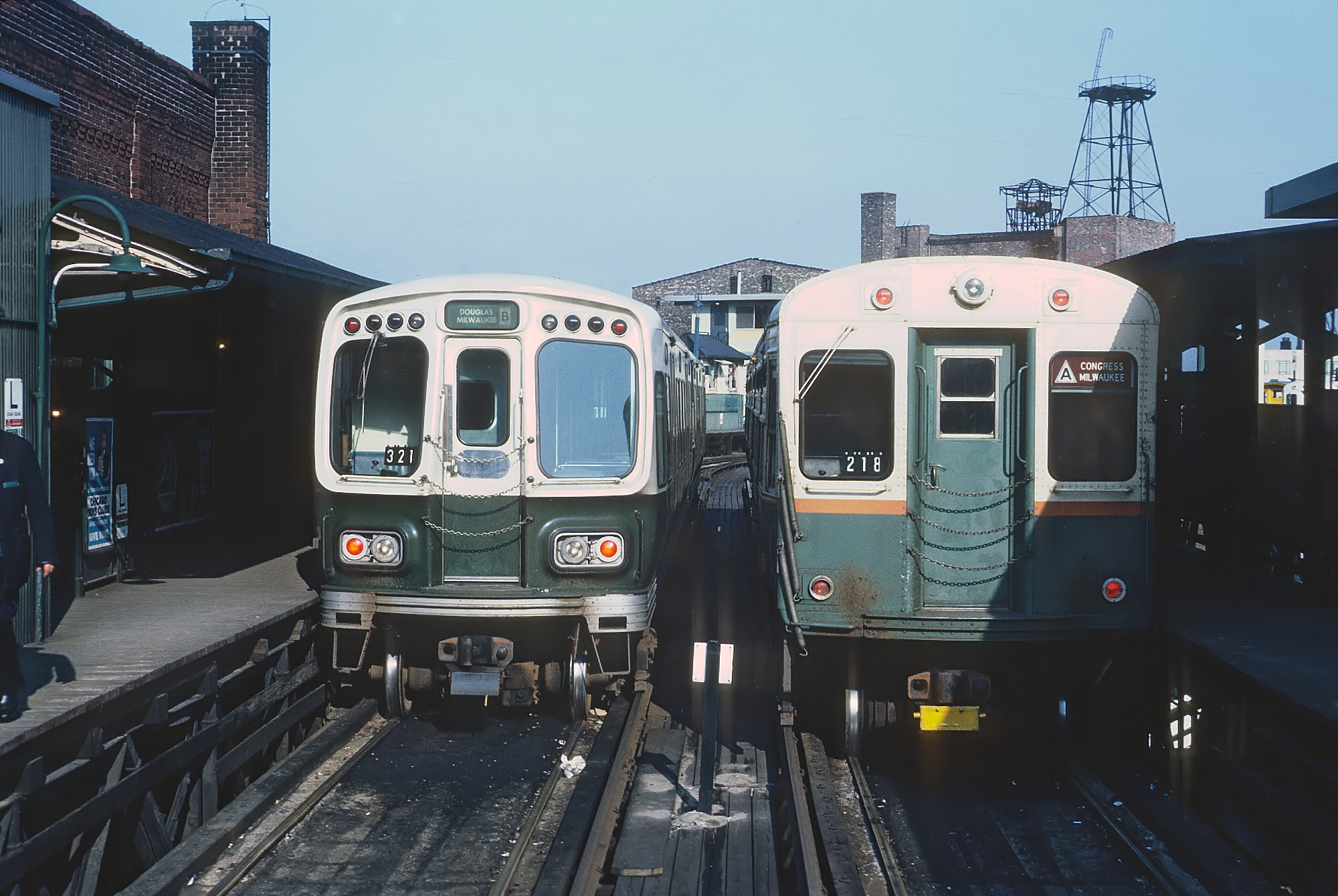
Two trains of different skip-stop services (A and B) on the old Logan Square station

On April 5, 1948, skip-stop came to the Lake Street Elevated. The line was particularly plagued by competing streetcar lines, closely-spaced stations, and aging infrastructure. It was combined with the closure of ten stations that were used by only eight percent of the line's ridership. It applied to the surviving stations east of Pulaski, which alternated between being "B" stations and "A" stations (except for Lake Street Transfer, which remained all-stop), and only between 6 a.m. and 6 p.m. on Mondays through Saturdays. Stations in the Loop were unaffected. These changes were accompanied by the closure and demolition of the old Market Terminal station and the abandonment of the line's pre-existing third express track.

The Lake Street experiment was considered a success, having cut its operating times by a third, and other routes soon followed. The "North-South route" (Howard–Englewood–Jackson Park) and Ravenswood branch were targeted next, adopting the skip-stop pattern on August 1, 1949, in concert with the closure of 23 lightly used stations. All stations were subject to the scheme. Stations on the Englewood branch were all "A" stations and those on the Jackson Park branch were all "B" stations. Service on the line ran from 6 a.m. to 9 p.m. on Mondays through Saturdays. Sunday skip-stop was tried on the route from 1950 to 1952 but created excessive wait times at the stations. No other routes attempted Sunday skip-stop.

Upon the Milwaukee-Dearborn subway's opening on February 25, 1951, a Sunday, it received weekday A/B service. This was discontinued the following morning after only one rush-hour period. This was due to the difficulty of changing the signage on the rolling stock due to the high ridership of the subway. Skip-stop returned to the subway in 1958, and remained until the system's discontinuation.

The Evanston Line (the modern-day Purple Line) and the Skokie Swift (modern-day Yellow Line) never had skip-stop service. The Evanston Line had a more traditional express service due to the North Side Main Line's quadruple track layout, while the Skokie Swift operated as a shuttle service, making the use of skip-stop infeasible.

=== Types of stations ===
The following station designations were used:

- A station: A station that was serviced by "A trains" only.
- B station: A station that was serviced by "B trains" only.
- AB station: A station that was serviced by both "A" and "B" trains.
- All-stop station: Identical to an "AB" station above, but used on lines without skip-stop.

A station's skip-stop status was indicated by its signage. From the 1940s to the 1970s, A stations were indicated by red or yellow bars on their station signage. B stations were indicated by blue or green bars. AB stations had both bars. Starting in the 1970s, A stations had red signs on their platforms, B stations had green signs and AB stations had blue signs. This system was replaced by having all stations have blue signs regardless of skip-stop type in the early 1990s.

== Decline and discontinuation ==
In spite of the CTA's efforts of the late 1940s and early 1950s, ridership on the "L" continued to decline as more people moved from the city to the suburbs. This declining ridership led to the gaps between trains becoming larger, leaving passengers who had missed one train being irate at seeing a train that did not stop at the station even if travel time was reduced once on the train.

This led to a diminution of the service over time. In 1993, the North-South route and West-South route swapped through routes south of the Loop, creating the Red Line and Green Line. Skip-stop service was abandoned on the Green Line due to lower ridership, while the Red Line abandoned skip-stop on the Dan Ryan branch due to stations being further apart. When the Orange Line opened later in 1993, it had all-stop service. By early 1995, skip-stop was only used during rush hour periods on the Howard portion of the Red Line, the O'Hare portion of the Blue Line, and the Brown Line. This dwindling ridership led to the practice's ultimate discontinuation in the Spring of 1995.

== Works cited ==
- Chicago's way out: The City Manager Plan. Chicago City Manager Committee. 1936.
- Schmidt, John R. (1989). "The Mayor Who Cleaned Up Chicago" A Political Biography of William E. Dever. DeKalb, Illinois: Northern Illinois University Press. ISBN 0-87580-144-7.
