= Metropolitan West Side Elevated Railroad =

Former Rapid Transit operator

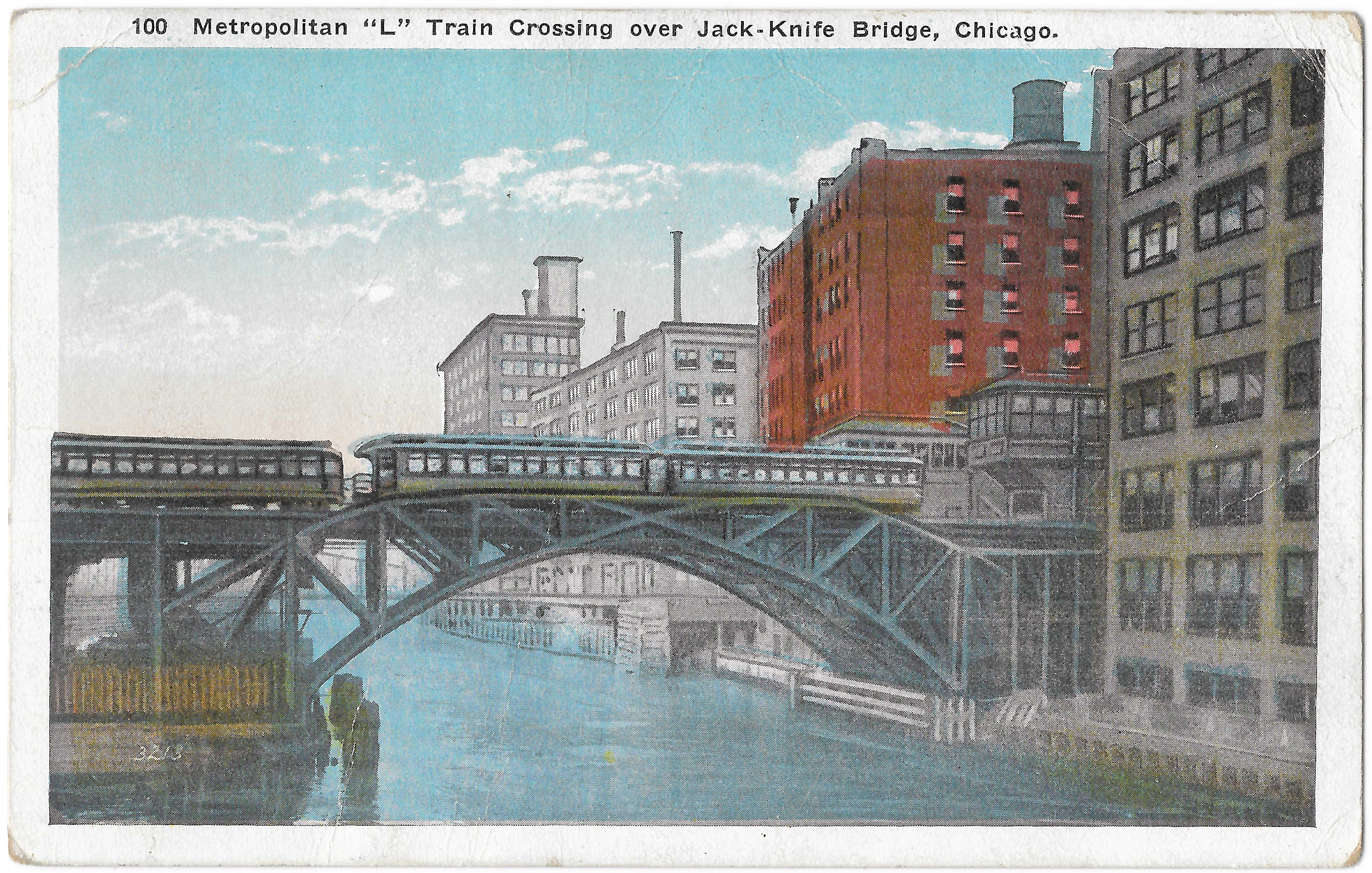
- A train on the Metropolitan main line passes over the Chicago river.

Overview
- Locale: Chicago, Illinois

Service
- Type: Rapid transit
- Services: Logan Square; Humboldt Park; Garfield Park; Douglas Park
- Operator(s): Metropolitan West Side Elevated Railroad Company (1895–1899); Metropolitan West side Elevated Railway (1899–1924)

History
- Opened: May 6, 1895; 131 years ago
- Closed: 1924; 102 years ago (merged into Chicago Rapid Transit Company)

Technical
- Character: Elevated
- Track gauge: 4 ft 8 1/2 in (1,435 mm) standard gauge
- Electrification: Third rail, 600 V DC

The Metropolitan West Side Elevated Railroad (known as the Met or Polly "L") was the third elevated rapid transit line to be built in Chicago, Illinois. It was the first of Chicago’s elevated lines to be electrically powered. The main line ran westward from downtown Chicago to Marshfield Avenue, with branches to Logan Square, Humboldt Park, Garfield Park, and Douglas Park (eventually extended to the suburb of Berwyn, Illinois). Portions of the system are still operated as sections of the Blue Line and the Pink Line.

== Operation ==
At 6:00 am on May 7, 1895, the first train of the Metropolitan West Side Elevated left the Robey Street station bound for the downtown terminal at Canal.

== Consolidation ==
The Metropolitan's route network, overlayed with the successor Blue and Pink Lines.

In 1913, Chicago's four elevated railroad companies came together to form the Chicago Elevated Railways Collateral Trust, establishing crosstown services for the first time. In 1924 all four companies were formally united to form the Chicago Rapid Transit Company. The Chicago Transit Authority took over the assets of the CRT in 1947. In 1951, the Logan Square branch was rerouted into the Milwaukee-Dearborn Subway, and the Humboldt Park Branch was cut back to a shuttle to Damen Avenue. The Humboldt Park branch would be discontinued a year later.

In 1952, the Douglas branch was shortened to its current terminal at 54th/Cermak and the Humboldt Park branch was closed. The construction of the Eisenhower Expressway (I-290) required the demolition of the Garfield Park branch and the main line but also called for a replacement rapid transit line in the median of the expressway. In 1958, the Garfield Park Branch was replaced by the Congress line, now known as the Forest Park branch of the Blue Line.

Much of the area the Metropolitan once served is still served today by the Chicago Transit Authority. Its Blue Line branch to O'Hare International Airport now uses a portion of the Met's Logan Square branch, while the Blue Line's Forest Park branch has replaced the Met's Garfield Park branch. The Met's Douglas Park branch, operated from 1958 to 2008 as a branch of the Blue Line, is now operated as the Pink Line.
