= Forest Park station =

Rapid transit station in Chicago

Forest Park 7650W 700S
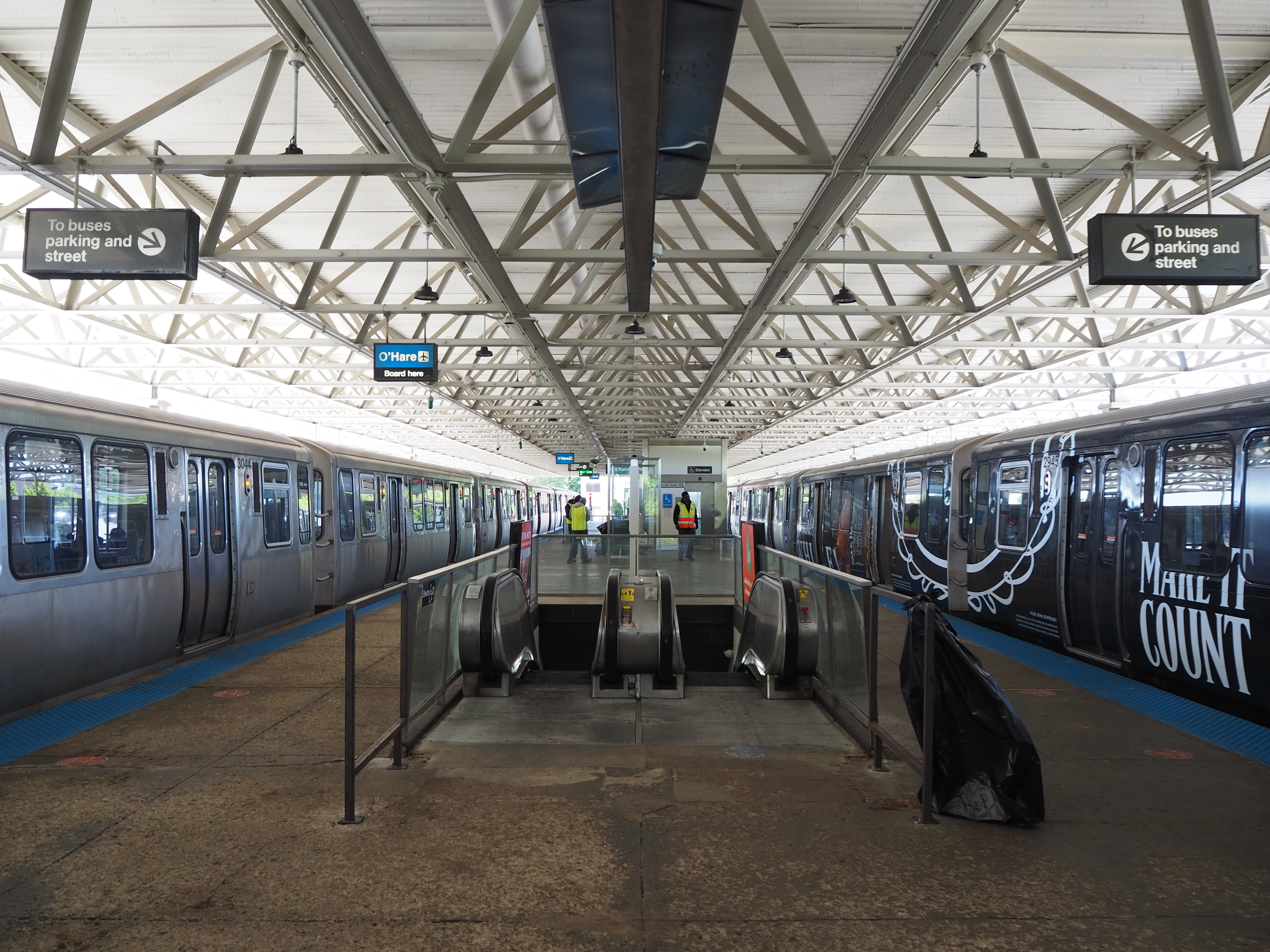

General information
- Location: 711 Des Plaines Avenue; Forest Park, Illinois 60130
- Coordinates: 41.874257°N 87.817318°W
- Owner: CTA, Village of Forest Park
- Line: Forest Park Branch
- Platforms: 1 island platform
- Tracks: 2

Construction
- Structure type: Elevated
- Parking: 1,051 spaces
- Accessible: Yes

History
- Opened: March 11, 1905; 121 years ago
- Rebuilt: 1953; 73 years ago, 1959; 67 years ago, 1981–1982; 44 years ago
- Former names: Des Plaines

Passengers
- 2025: 371,266 ▼1.9%

Services
Preceding station	Chicago "L"	Following station
Terminus	Blue Line	Harlem toward O'Hare
Former services
Preceding station	Chicago Great Western Railway	Following station
Maywood toward Omaha	Omaha – Chicago	Chicago Terminus
Preceding station	Chicago Terminal Transfer Railroad	Following station
Altenheim toward Thatcher's Park	Chicago & Northern Pacific – Main Line	South Oak Park toward Chicago
Preceding station	Chicago Aurora and Elgin Railroad	Following station
5th Avenue–Maywood toward Wheaton	Main Line	Oak Park One-way operation
Preceding station	Chicago "L"	Following station
Terminus	Garfield Park branch	Hannah Closed 1952 toward Marshfield
5th Avenue Closed 1951 toward Mannheim/22nd	Westchester branch	Terminus
Track layout
Location

Forest Park is a station on the Chicago Transit Authority's 'L' system, located in the village of Forest Park, Illinois and serving the Blue Line. Before the Congress Line was built, it served as terminal for the Garfield Line. It is the western terminus of the Forest Park branch. The station was known as Des Plaines until 1994. It is also referred to as the Forest Park Transit Center by Pace because it is a major terminal for Pace buses. The station contains a 1,051-space Park and Ride lot which uses the "Pay and Display" system, in which fees are paid at the lot entrance. It is located south of the Baltimore and Ohio Chicago Terminal Railroad tracks which curve to the north of the station towards Madison Street where the line rechristens itself to the Canadian National Railway's Waukesha Subdivision.

== History ==
Forest Park destination sign

Forest Park opened in 1902, as a local interurban station on the Aurora Elgin and Chicago Railway. On March 11, 1905, the Metropolitan West Side Elevated Railroad extended its Garfield Park rapid transit service west over the tracks of the Aurora Elgin and Chicago. An amusement park was located in this lot for 14 years (1908–1922) when an enormous fire incinerated parts of it, causing it to be shut down permanently. At this time Forest Park became the western terminal for the 'L' while continuing to serve as an interurban station. In 1958, the Congress Branch opened in the median of the Eisenhower Expressway, the Blue Line was rerouted and connected to the Milwaukee-Dearborn Subway Station LaSalle making Forest Park, the southern terminus of the Blue Line. Forest Park, however, is one of the few stations in the Congress Branch line that is not in the median of the Eisenhower Expressway, and is 350 meters (1,148 ft 4 in) north of it. In 1966, the park-and-ride lot with 1,051 spaces was opened and a new station was built and completed in December 1982 along with the Transit Center that provides connection to many bus lines.

On August 23, 2006, a new pedestrian bridge was lifted into place over the Des Plaines River between Maywood and Forest Park. The bridge and new approaches permit a direct crossing over the Des Plaines River, allowing the main stem of the Illinois Prairie Path to terminate further east, at the Forest Park station. The bridge and approaches opened in late October 2006, after lighting and emergency call boxes were installed.

On December 16, 2012, the CTA discontinued the 17 Westchester route, leaving only Pace buses to serve Forest Park.

The station is open 24 hours a day/7 days a week and 1,175,588 passengers used the station in 2011.

Service between Forest Park and Austin was temporarily suspended on September 2, 2024, while police investigated the shooting of four people sleeping in two cars of a Forest Park-bound Blue Line train shortly before 5:30 AM CDT. Three were pronounced dead at the scene, a fourth died in the hospital later. A suspect was later arrested by Chicago Police at a Pink Line station in Chicago approximately 90 minutes later.

== Bus connections ==
Pace

- 301 Roosevelt Road
- 303 Forest Park-Rosemont
- 305 East Roosevelt Road
- 308 Medical Center
- 310 Madison Street-Hillside
- 317 Westchester
- 318 West North Avenue
