= Laflin station =

Rapid transit station in Chicago, 1895–1951

LAFLIN 1500W 400S
- Laflin station in 1911

General information
- Location: 418 South Laflin Street; Chicago, Illinois
- Coordinates: 41.87585°N 87.664212°W
- Owner: Chicago Transit Authority
- Line: Metropolitan main line
- Platforms: Originally 2 island platforms, later 1 island platform and 2 side platforms
- Tracks: 4 tracks

Construction
- Structure type: Elevated

History
- Opened: May 6, 1895
- Closed: December 9, 1951
- Rebuilt: 1898–1914 (platforms reconfigured); 1905 (casket elevator added)

Passengers
- 1950: 120,915 ▼46.47% (CTA)
- Rank: 110 out of 123

Former services
Preceding station	Chicago "L"	Following station
Marshfield Terminus	Metropolitan main line	Racine toward Loop (LaSalle/Van Buren) or Wells Street Terminal
Location

Laflin was a rapid transit station operated by the Chicago "L"'s Metropolitan West Side Elevated Railroad and located on its main line. The station existed from 1895 to 1951, when it was closed due to low ridership. The entire main line would soon be demolished for construction of the Eisenhower Expressway and its Congress Line, and the niche served by the Laflin would be filled by an entrance on the new line's Racine station.

== History ==
The Metropolitan West Side Elevated Railroad Company was granted a 50-year franchise by the Chicago City Council on April 7, 1892, and began securing right of way shortly thereafter. As designed, the Metropolitan's operations would comprise a main line that went west from downtown to Marshfield, where three branches – one northwest to Logan Square, one due west to Garfield Park, and one southwest to Douglas Park – would diverge and serve various parts of Chicago's west side. A further branch to Humboldt Park would proceed due west from the Logan Square branch just past Robey Street. (Note: Technically, the Logan Square branch started after Robey and was, like the Humboldt Park branch, a divergence from what was formally known as the "Northwest branch". However, as early as 1898, even the Metropolitan itself was referring to the Northwest branch as part of the "Logan Square branch".) Unlike the competing South Side and Lake Street Elevateds, the Metropolitan never used steam traction; although it had originally intended to, and indeed had built much of its structure under the assumption that locomotives would be used, it decided in May 1894 to have electrified tracks instead, making it upon its opening the first electric elevated railroad in the United States. The Metropolitan began service at 6 a.m. on Monday, May 6, 1895, between Robey on the Logan Square branch and Canal on the main line. Eleven stations opened that day, one of which was on Laflin Street.

The Metropolitan's lines were originally operated by the West Side Construction Company, which had been responsible for constructing them, and would be transferred to the Metropolitan on October 6, 1896. The backers and officers of the two companies were largely identical, however, so this transfer of ownership was nominal. The expenses incurred in constructing the Metropolitan's vast trackage would come back to haunt the company, which entered receivership in 1897; the similarly-named Metropolitan West Side Elevated Railway Company was organized in January 1899 and assumed operations on February 3 of that year. The new Metropolitan, along with the other companies operating "L" lines in Chicago, became a part of the Chicago Elevated Railways (CER) trust on July 1, 1911. CER acted as a de facto holding company for the "L" – unifying its operations, instituting the same management across the companies, and instituting free transfers between the lines starting in 1913 – but kept the underlying companies intact. This continued until the companies were formally merged into the single Chicago Rapid Transit Company (CRT) in 1924, which assumed operations on January 9; the former Metropolitan was designated the Metropolitan Division of the CRT for administrative purposes. Although municipal ownership of transit had been a hotly-contested issue for half a century, the publicly-owned Chicago Transit Authority (CTA) would not be created until 1945, or assume operation of the "L" until October 1, 1947.

=== Closure and demolition ===
Major revisions to the Garfield Park and Douglas Park lines took place on December 9, 1951. The Westchester branch, a westward extension of the Garfield Park branch, was replaced by a bus service, and on Sundays "L" service west of Laramie – including the bus route that replaced the Westchester branch – was replaced by two bus routes connecting to the Lake Street Elevated; Westchester buses connected at Marion and Garfield Park buses connected at Central. Laflin was closed as part of these revisions alongside six other stations on the Douglas Park branch. Skip-stop was implemented on the surviving portions on the routes.

The trackage on which Laflin lay was abandoned in 1954 as the main line was demolished in favor of the Congress Line, and the Congress Line's Racine station opened in 1958 with an entrance on Loomis Street, one block east of Laflin Street.

=== Accidents and incidents ===
A collision occurred at the station on the night of August 8, 1895. A westbound train was wrongly switched while heading to the station and rear-ended a three-car train whose rearmost car was being oiled and cleaned on the underside by two oilers. The two oilers were pinned to the tracks by the collision, which caused both cars involved to derail, and were injured seriously, one possibly mortally. Despite the oilers' greasy clothes and wooden surroundings, no fire broke out and neither car was irreparably damaged, although traffic on the line was delayed by half an hour.

== Station details ==
Laflin's station house was built of red pressed brick with a stone sill and foundation. Having a flat elevation, it had painted walls and a hardwood floor, as well as a restroom and water heater.

The stairways and platforms of the station were wooden atop steel girders. The main line was quadruple-tracked throughout its length; its stations, including Laflin, originally had two island platforms between an inner and outer track. This proved to create a hazardous curve on the outer tracks, so the station was reconstructed between 1898 and 1914 to have two side platforms for each outer track and an island platform between the inner tracks. Each platform had a canopy with a cast iron frame and corrugated tin hipped roof.

An elevator was added to Laflin, as well as Hoyne on the Metropolitan's Douglas Park branch, in 1905 in order to lift caskets for the Metropolitan's funeral trains, which transported decedents to various such suburban cemeteries as Waldheim and Mount Carmel. Plans for casket elevators at more stations were shelved as they proved unnecessary given the ease with which pallbearers could carry caskets up station stairs. Funeral train service was discontinued in 1934 after having been rendered obsolete by advances in road paving and automotive technology.

=== Ridership ===
Between 1900 and 1951, Laflin was the station on the main line with the lowest ridership every year except for 1904, when the Wells Street Terminal did not open until autumn and consequently underserved it. Ridership peaked at 623,529 passengers in 1924. After 1927 the station would not serve more than half a million annual passengers again, a bar that all other main line stations cleared every year throughout the first half of the 20th century. In the last year of its operations, 1951, Laflin serviced 94,764 passengers, whereas the station on the main line with the next-lowest ridership, the Wells Street Terminal, had 272,169. In 1950, both stations' last full year of operations, the respective performances were 120,915 and 392,450; for Laflin, this represented a 46.47 percent decrease from the 225,890 of 1949. Laflin's 1950 performance made it the 110th-busiest of the 123 "L" stations that were at least partially manned that year; for the part of 1951 it was open, it was the 117th-busiest of 131 such stations at the beginning of the year. (Note: The Humboldt Park, Normal Park, and Westchester branches, which all closed in the 1950s, had all of their stations unstaffed by 1950 in favor of on-train conductors, meaning that their stations did not collect ridership statistics. The Garfield Park branch likewise did not collect ridership statistics by station in its final years. The Milwaukee-Dearborn subway opened in 1951, while its predecessor Northwest branch had not collected station ridership statistics since 1948. Several stations closed on the "L" in 1951, while Central Park station was opened that year to replace several stations on the Douglas branch.)

== Works cited ==
- CTA Rail Entrance, Annual Traffic, 1900–1979 (Report). Chicago: Chicago Transit Authority. October 1, 1979.
- Borzo, Greg (2007). The Chicago "L". Arcadia. ISBN 9780738551005 – via Google Books.
- Moffat, Bruce G. (1995). The "L": The Development of Chicago's Rapid Transit System, 1888–1932. Chicago: Central Electric Railfans' Association. ISBN 0-915348-30-6.
- "The Metropolitan West Side Elevated Railroad of Chicago". The Street Railway Review. 5: 263–274. January 15, 1895.
