= Halsted station (CTA Metropolitan Main Line) =

Rapid transit station in Chicago, 1895–1958

HALSTED 800W 400S
- Halsted being demolished in July 1958, shortly after its closure. The southernmost platform and tracks had been demolished several years earlier, leaving only the island platform and one side platform.

General information
- Location: 420 South Halsted Street; Chicago, Illinois
- Coordinates: 41.875916°N 87.647643°W
- Owner: Chicago Transit Authority
- Line: Metropolitan main line
- Platforms: 2 island platforms (before 1914); 1 island platform and 2 side platforms (after 1914)
- Tracks: 4 tracks

Construction
- Structure type: Elevated

History
- Opened: May 6, 1895
- Closed: June 22, 1958
- Rebuilt: 1914 (tracks and platforms); 1920s (station house)

Passengers
- 1957: 356,082 ▼21.99% (CTA)
- Rank: 78 out of 133

Former services
Preceding station	Chicago "L"	Following station
Racine toward Marshfield	Metropolitan main line	Canal toward Loop (LaSalle/Van Buren) or Wells Street Terminal
Location

Halsted was a rapid transit station located on the Metropolitan main line of the Chicago "L". It was in existence from 1895 to 1958, when the entire main line was replaced by the Congress Line located in the median of the nearby Eisenhower Expressway. Halsted station in particular was replaced by UIC-Halsted on the Congress Line, which eventually became part of the Blue Line.

== History ==
The Metropolitan main line and Logan Square branch commenced operations on May 6, 1895, containing several stations including Halsted. The main line was replaced by the Congress Line in 1958, and it and its station were demolished accordingly.

== Station details ==
The main line had four tracks throughout its length. As originally designed, its stations had two island platforms, each between an outer track and an inner track, with the outer tracks bowing out to accommodate the platforms. This proved to produce a hazardous curve of the outer tracks, so the stations were reconfigured between 1898 and 1914. Halsted was changed to have an island platform between the inner tracks and two side platforms for each outer track. All platforms involved were wooden and built on a steel structure, and had hipped roof canopies of corrugated tin atop iron canopy frames; the original island platforms had the canopies cover approximately two-thirds of their original lengths, as well as their stairwells.

Like other stations on the main line (but unlike the stations on the Metropolitan's Garfield Park and Logan Square branches, which had station houses with a semicircular elevation and bay windows), the original Halsted station house had a flat front, and was of brick construction with a sill and foundation of stone. Its interior had painted walls and ceiling with hardwood finishes, a bathroom and water heater, and a ticket agent's booth and newsstand. The station house was renovated and enlarged in the 1920s, and was changed to an off-white terra cotta design in the Beaux-Arts style by transit architect Arthur U. Gerber; this new station house included retail spaces next to the station entrance.

=== Ridership ===
In its last full year of operation, 1957, Halsted served 356,082 passengers, a 21.99 percent decline from the 456,486 passengers served in 1956. Its 1957 performance made it the 78th-busiest of the 133 "L" stations that were at least partially-staffed at the beginning of the year, whereas in 1956 it had been the 71st-busiest of 134 such stations. For the part of 1958 it was open, the main line's Halsted station served 117,333 passengers and was the 112th-busiest of 124 stations. (Note: Hamlin and Loomis stations on the Lake Street Elevated were both closed in 1956, while Isabella on the Evanston branch regained its agent in 1957. Both the Kenwood and Stock Yards branches closed during 1957, as did Wood station on the Douglas branch; the Congress Line opened in 1958 with the closure of the main line, and is not included in this count. Station riderships in this era are somewhat complicated by the use of conductors on several "L" lines during off-peak hours instead of station agents, meaning that passengers would be counted for line ridership but not station ridership.)

== Works cited ==
- CTA Rail Entrance, Annual Traffic, 1900–1979 (Report). Chicago: Chicago Transit Authority. October 1, 1979.
