= Franklin/Van Buren station =

Rapid transit station in Chicago, 1897–1955

FRANKLIN & VAN BUREN 300W 400S
- Franklin/Van Buren station c. 1937, viewed from the outer LaSalle/Van Buren station platform

General information
- Location: Franklin Street and Van Buren Street; Chicago, Illinois
- Coordinates: 41.87682°N 87.63518°W
- Owner: Chicago Transit Authority
- Line: Metropolitan Main Line
- Platforms: 2 side platforms
- Tracks: 2 tracks

Construction
- Structure type: Elevated

History
- Opened: October 11, 1897
- Closed: October 11, 1955

Former services
Preceding station	Chicago "L"	Following station
Canal toward Marshfield	Metropolitan main line	Quincy One-way operation
Canal toward Marshfield	Metropolitan main line	LaSalle/Van Buren Loop-bound terminus
Location

Franklin/Van Buren was a station on the Chicago Transit Authority's Metropolitan Main Line. The station was located at Franklin Street and Van Buren Street in downtown Chicago. Franklin/Van Buren opened on October 11, 1897, and closed 58 years later on October 11, 1955.

== History and architecture ==
The station featured a Colonial Revival design executed in pressed sheet metal and tin, creating decorative flourishes such as fluted pilasters and Tuscan posts. The rectangular building was topped with a gable roof featuring small dormers. The station closed on October 11, 1955, to facilitate the construction of the Congress Expressway (now the Eisenhower Expressway), with Garfield Park trains rerouted through the former Wells Street Terminal.
