= Racine station =

Racine station could refer to:

- Racine station (CTA Blue Line)
- Racine station (CTA Green Line)
- Racine station (CTA Metropolitan Main Line)
- Racine station, a Lake Street Elevated station
- Racine Avenue station (located on the Metra Electric line)
- Racine station (Wisconsin), a former C&NW railroad station and current bus station
