= Edward Moore (critic) =

Edward Colman Moore (January 22, 1877 - October 6, 1935) was an American music critic, music journalist, writer on music, composer, and songwriter.

== Life and career ==
The son of Alfred Louis Moore and Sarah Louise Moore (née Colman), Edward Colman Moore was born in Fond du Lac, Wisconsin on January 22, 1877. His father was vice-president and general manager of the Moline Wagon Company in Moline, Illinois. He was educated at St. John's Military Academy prior to attending Yale University where he graduated with a Bachelor of Arts in 1899. He pursued further studies at Northwestern University School of Law where he graduated with an LL.B in 1902.

Moore studied music with Horatio Parker and Julius Klauser prior to moving to Chicago in 1904. On October 28, 1911, Moore married Hazel Humble in Chicago. They lived in a home on Groveland Ave in Highland Park, Illinois. In 1909 he began working as a music critic for Chicago Daily Journal; remaining in that position until 1921 when he was appointed music critic at the Chicago Tribune. He remained critic at the Chicago Tribune until his death fourteen years later.

As a composer Moore's best known works were the prize-winning "Pavlowa" (1914) and "Ave Verum" (1921). He was also active as a songwriter. He wrote the music to the songs "The Rivals", "When I Cease to Dream", and "Line O'Tyoe". He composed the scores to Wallace Rice's musical plays Masque of Illinois (1918) and Chicago Festival Play (1921). The New York Times stated that he was best known as the author of the book Forty Years of Opera in Chicago. He was also a leader in the planning of the Chicagoland music festivals and was a passionate advocate for the creation of operas by Americans composers that used English language libretti.

Moore died of a heart attack in Chicago on October 6, 1935. He was waiting for a train at Racine station when he died. His wife, Hazel Moore, was appointed his successor as music critic at the Chicago Tribune.
