= Canal station =

Rapid transit station in Chicago, 1895–1958

CANAL 500W 300S

General information
- Location: 324–326 South Canal Street; Chicago, Illinois
- Coordinates: 41.8773°N 87.6397°W
- Owner: Chicago Transit Authority (1947–1958); Chicago Rapid Transit Company (1924–1947); See text before 1924
- Lines: Metropolitan main line Chicago Aurora and Elgin Railroad
- Platforms: 2 island platforms
- Tracks: 4 tracks
- Connections: Union Station

Construction
- Structure type: Elevated
- Cycle facilities: Yes

History
- Opened: May 6, 1895
- Closed: June 22, 1958
- Rebuilt: 1922

Key dates
- August 1, 1927: CA&E service introduced
- February 25, 1951: Logan Square and Humboldt Park service discontinued
- September 20, 1953: CA&E service discontinued
- April 4, 1954: Douglas Park service discontinued

Passengers
- 1957: 2,089,044 ▼10.19% (CTA)
- Rank: 23 out of 133

Former services
Preceding station	Chicago "L"	Following station
Halsted toward Marshfield	Metropolitan main line	Franklin Street Terminal Closed 1897 Terminus
Halsted toward Marshfield	Metropolitan main line	Wells Street Terminal Closed 1951 Terminus
Halsted toward Marshfield	Metropolitan main line	Franklin/Van Buren Closed 1955 toward Loop (LaSalle/Van Buren)
Preceding station	Chicago Aurora and Elgin Railroad	Following station
Marshfield Avenue toward Wheaton	Main Line	Chicago One-way operation
Location

Canal was a rapid transit station located on the Metropolitan main line of the Chicago "L" that was in service from 1895 to 1958, when the entire main line was replaced by the Congress Line located in the median of the nearby Eisenhower Expressway. Starting in 1927, the interurban Chicago Aurora and Elgin Railroad (CA&E) also served the station, continuing until 1953. The station connected with Chicago's Union Station, which was one of the city's rail terminals. One of the busiest stations on the Metropolitan's routes, and of the "L" in general, it opened a second entrance on Clinton Street in 1914.

The Metropolitan operated a vast network of routes across Chicago's west side, including three branches – the Douglas Park, Garfield Park, and Logan Square branches – diverging from its main line. It operated, with interruptions and financial issues, until it handed operations to Chicago Elevated Railways (CER) in 1911, and formally merged into the Chicago Rapid Transit Company (CRT) in 1924. The "L" was taken over by the publicly-held Chicago Transit Authority (CTA) in 1947.

Substantial revisions to the lines that had been constructed by the Metropolitan had been planned since the 1930s; all told, they would replace the Logan Square branch with a subway to go directly downtown and substitute a rapid transit right of way in the median of the Congress Superhighway for the main line and Garfield Park branch. This was largely complete by the 1958 opening of the Congress Line, which includes a station on Clinton Street near the site of Canal.

Canal was located on the four-track main line and had two island platforms in common with other stations on the main line.

== History ==
The Metropolitan West Side Elevated Railroad Company was granted a 50-year franchise by the Chicago City Council on April 7, 1892, and began securing right of way shortly thereafter. As designed, the Metropolitan's operations comprised a main line that went westward from downtown to diverge into three branches – one northwest to Logan Square, one due west to Garfield Park, and one southwest to Douglas Park – and serve various parts of Chicago's west side. A further branch to Humboldt Park would proceed due west from the Logan Square branch past Robey Street. (Note: Technically, the Logan Square branch started after Robey and was, like the Humboldt Park branch, a divergence from what was formally known as the "Northwest branch". However, as early as 1898, even the Metropolitan itself was referring to the Northwest branch as part of the "Logan Square branch", although ridership statistics continued to separate them.) Originally intending for its railroad to be powered by steam locomotives like the competing South Side and Lake Street Elevateds, the Metropolitan decided in May 1894 to use electric traction instead; the tracks had already been largely constructed prior to the decision to electrify them, but retrofitting the third rail proved an easy task outside of the switches of the main line.

The main line and Logan Square branch up to Robey had their tracks completed by the middle of October 1894 and were given power in April 1895 for test and inspection runs. They began service at 6 a.m. on Monday, May 6, 1895, between Robey and Canal. Upon its opening, the Metropolitan became the first revenue electric elevated railroad in the United States. Originally planning to terminate downtown at Fifth Avenue, the Metropolitan was forced to trim its downtown right of way back one block to Franklin Street due to acquisition costs. Even on opening day, work on the bridge crossing the Chicago River was not yet done, so trains terminated at Canal until the Franklin Street Terminal was ready on May 17.

The Loop, an elevated rail trackage to be used as a common downtown terminal between all "L" companies, was planned as early as 1894 and opened on October 11, 1897. The Metropolitan closed the Franklin Street Terminal and routed all its trains through the Loop. The Loop frequently overflowed during rush hours, however, so the Metropolitan soon started terminating some trains at Canal, using stub tracks to turn them back; these trains also benefited west side factory workers, who were not bound for the Loop. This continued until a new terminal on Fifth Avenue – renamed "Wells Street" in 1912 – was constructed to handle overflow traffic in 1904.

The Metropolitan's lines were originally operated by the West Side Construction Company, which had been responsible for constructing them, and were transferred to the Metropolitan on October 6, 1896. The backers and officers of the two companies were largely identical, however, so this transfer of ownership was nominal. The expenses incurred in constructing the Metropolitan's vast trackage would catch up to the company, which entered receivership in 1897; the similarly-named Metropolitan West Side Elevated Railway Company was organized in January 1899 and assumed operations on February 3 of that year.

The Metropolitan, along with the other companies operating "L" lines in Chicago, became a part of the Chicago Elevated Railways (CER) trust on July 1, 1911. CER acted as a de facto holding company for the "L" – unifying its operations, instituting the same management across the companies, and instituting free transfers between the lines starting in 1913 – but kept the underlying companies intact. This continued until the companies were formally merged into the single Chicago Rapid Transit Company (CRT), which assumed operations on January 9, 1924; the former Metropolitan was designated the Metropolitan Division of the CRT for administrative purposes. Although municipal ownership of transit had been a hotly-contested issue for half a century, the publicly-owned Chicago Transit Authority (CTA) would not be created until 1945, or assume operation of the "L" until October 1, 1947.

=== Union Station and CA&E service ===
Union Station had been built in 1888 and was located on the Chicago River a few blocks from Canal. The station was consequently often used as a gateway to go to the west side for people leaving Union Station. Ridership was such that a second entrance was added onto Clinton Street in 1914.

The Canal station and its surroundings were destroyed by a fire in the early morning of March 15, 1922. The fire, which killed a firefighter, was such that trains were blocked from reaching the Canal station or points beyond for the next several days due to the warping of the tracks. The fire necessitated a rebuild of the station.

Union Station was rebuilt in 1925, and the new station was located closer to Canal, one block away. It included a transfer point to the Canal station. Because the rebuilt terminal's headhouse and concourse stood on opposite sides of Canal Street, connected by an underground passageway, Canal station itself sat directly above the south tracks and was linked to the concourse by a direct, weather-protected walkway. The Aurora Elgin and Chicago Railway (AE&C) was an interurban that had been in service since August 25, 1902, and using the Metropolitan's Garfield Park branch, main line, and Wells Street Terminal since March 11, 1905. Bankrupt in the aftermath of World War I, it was reorganized into the Chicago Aurora and Elgin Railroad (CA&E) in 1921. Despite this usage, the CA&E did not begin stopping at Canal until the Union Station reconstruction on August 1, 1927.

=== Congress Line and demolition ===
The Metropolitan main line, including Canal station; from the Market Street Junction on the east side of the Chicago River, the northern tracks led to the Wells Street Terminal and post-1955 Loop junction, whereas the southern tracks led to the pre-1955 Loop junction. The Blue Line and Clinton station The Loop and Union Station

A superhighway that would become Interstate 290 or the "Eisenhower", following the route of Congress Street, had been proposed since the 1909 Plan of Chicago and more thoroughly planned in the early 1930s. A 1939 plan introduced the idea of replacing the main line and Garfield Park branch with a line of rapid transit running through this highway. Construction on the expressway and the "Congress Line" was adopted by the City Council in 1940 and formally authorized for construction in 1946. Three different agreements were made between the CTA, Chicago, Cook County, and Illinois between 1951 and 1954 concerning the financing and ownership of the new construction, which soon commenced.

A separate but related project, the Milwaukee–Dearborn subway, opened on February 25, 1951, rerouting Logan Square and Humboldt Park trains from Canal. Changes were made to the Garfield Park and Douglas Park lines on December 9, 1951. Several stations were closed, including Laflin on the main line. Skip-stop, wherein trains were designated either as "A" trains or "B" trains and stopped at respective "A" or "B" stations, was applied during weekdays to the surviving stations; Canal was designated an "all-stop" station under this scheme and was thus unaffected. "L" service to the Wells Street Terminal was also discontinued, meaning that only CA&E trains served it from then on.

More changes came in September 1953; the Garfield Park "L" trackage was replaced by temporary street-level ("at-grade") tracks between Sacramento Boulevard and Aberdeen Street, essentially removing all stops between Kedzie on the branch and Halsted on the main line. This change impacted westbound trains on September 20, 1953, and eastbound trains on September 27. The CA&E, having long struggled financially, refused to use the at-grade tracks due to safety concerns as well as the prospect of delays caused by the use of traffic signals at road crossings, and had serious doubts about its ability to reroute its right of way into the new expressway median. Despite some speculative plans for alternative train service to downtown Chicago, and after being disallowed by state regulators to abandon rail service altogether in favor of buses, the CA&E ultimately abandoned service east of Des Plaines on September 20. Douglas Park trains stopped using the main line in favor of the Paulina Connector to get downtown on April 4, 1954. This left Garfield Park trains as the only traffic remaining at Canal.

In an unrelated project, Market Street was being widened into the southern leg of Wacker Drive on the riverbank opposite Canal; this required that the Market Street Junction switching trains between the Loop and the Wells Street Terminal be removed. The crossings were removed in the summer of 1954 and all trains were routed through the southern two tracks between Halsted and the Loop. On October 11, 1955, this structure, including the Franklin/Van Buren station, was in turn closed as trains instead used the northern two tracks through the former Wells Street Terminal to directly join the Loop. This arrangement continued, with the southern tracks sitting abandoned, until Garfield Park service ended altogether on June 22, 1958. The new line contains a station on Clinton Street near where Canal had stood.

== Station details ==
The Metropolitan boasted of providing water closets, water fountains, newsstands, and waiting rooms at its stations, which also included racks for bicycles, staff to announce those in waiting rooms of approaching trains, and space for baby carriages. Unlike elsewhere on the "L", the Metropolitan's station houses had central heating and basements. The station had two island platforms.

The original station house was destroyed by the 1922 fire; the rebuilt design was to an off-white terra cotta design in the Beaux-Arts style by transit architect Arthur U. Gerber. The rebuilt station did not, however, include any shelter on the westbound platform. The new station house had a stairway descending below to a walkway, which connected passengers to Union Station half a block away. This walkway was separated from Union Station's tracks and platforms by an iron fence, and directed patrons to Union Station's lobby. The circuitousness of this route led to its being dubbed the "frustration walk" for commuters, although it was considered one of the few good areas for railfans to see trains at Union Station at the time. There were two connections between the walkway and the "L" station; patrons coming from the "L" would use the station house, whereas those coming from Union Station were led directly to the "L" platforms through a covered walkway from Track 2 of the Union Station trainshed after going through a special fare collection area.

=== Operations ===
As originally opened, the Metropolitan's trains ran every six minutes between 6 a.m. and 6:30 p.m., and every ten minutes during the night; the average speed was 16 mph (26 km/h). By 1898, this schedule was updated so that trains ran at 30-minute intervals on each branch, or 7.5 minutes on the main line. Trains running the Westchester branch, which was a western extension of the Garfield Park branch opened in 1926, ran express from Canal on the main line to Laramie on the Garfield Park branch.

The CA&E stopped at Canal to board westbound passengers and alight eastbound passengers; conductors checked the tickets of everyone who had boarded at the Wells Street Terminal at Canal as well. Passengers boarded westbound trains on the train's left side; since the motorman was unable to see out of that side, the conductor was also needed to signal the end of the boarding process using the train's buzzer. Lest it compete with the "L" directly, CA&E passengers were not allowed to board eastbound trains at Canal, nor were westbound passengers allowed to alight at stations within the "L"'s area of service. CA&E trains were limited to 45 mph (72 km/h) on "L" tracks, although in practice the curves of the main line limited operation to as slow as 12 mph (19 km/h) around Canal. Nevertheless, CA&E took one minute to go from Wells Street to Canal.

Unlike the Lake Street Elevated, which operated smoking cars at some times but not at others, all of the Metropolitan's motor cars allowed smoking. Smoking was banned by the city across the "L" and in streetcars in response to a 1918 influenza outbreak, a prohibition that has remained in force ever since. Nevertheless, the CA&E still allowed smoking as late as 1948, splitting its cars into smoking and non-smoking components.

=== Ridership ===
In the last year of the three-branch model, 1950, Canal served 2,089,044 riders, making it the 14th-busiest of 123 "L" stations and the busiest in the former Metropolitan division. After the construction of the subway the following year, Canal's ridership declined to 1,816,228, its ranking declined to 21 out of 132, and it was surpassed on the former Metropolitan by the Logan Square terminal connected to the subway. After 1954, however, it would regain its lead over Logan Square.

In the final full year of its operation, 1957, Canal served 1,203,404 passengers, making it the 23rd-busiest of 133 "L" stations and the busiest in the former Metropolitan division outside of the new Dearborn subway. The station's 1957 performance was a 10.19 percent decline from the 1956 figure of 1,339,873 riders, when it had been the 19th-busiest of 134 stations. For the part of 1958 it was open, the station served 509,669 riders, being the 68th-busiest out of 138 "L" stations open during at least part of that year. The new Clinton station picked up 581,012 patrons for the rest of 1958, with a rank of 62 out of those 138 stations, and for its first full year, 1959, served 1,391,855 riders to be the 15th-busiest "L" station out of 136.

== Works cited ==
- "The Metropolitan West Side Elevated Railroad of Chicago". The Street Railway Review. 5: 263–274. January 15, 1895.
- Borzo, Greg (2007). The Chicago "L". Charleston, South Carolina: Arcadia. ISBN 9780738551005 – via Google Books.
- "Chicago Rapid Transit Company: Metropolitan Division" (PDF). Bulletins of the Central Electric Railfans' Association (2). Chicago: Central Electric Railfans' Association. February 1939.
- Public Information Department (1967). Congress Rapid Transit. Chicago: Chicago Transit Authority – via Internet Archive.
- CTA Rail Entrance, Annual Traffic, 1900–1979 (Report). Chicago: Chicago Transit Authority. October 1, 1979.
- Moffat, Bruce G. (1995). The "L": The Development of Chicago's Rapid Transit System, 1888–1932. Chicago: Central Electric Railfans' Association. ISBN 0-915348-30-6.
- Weller, Peter; Stark, Fred (1999). The Living Legacy of the Chicago Aurora and Elgin. San Francisco: Forum Press. ISBN 0-945213-41-7 – via Internet Archive.
