= Racine station (CTA Metropolitan Main Line) =

Rapid transit station in Chicago, 1895–1954

RACINE 1200W 400S

General information
- Location: 416–418 South Racine Avenue; Chicago, Illinois
- Coordinates: 41.87592°N 87.659458°W
- Owner: Chicago Transit Authority
- Line: Metropolitan main line
- Platforms: Originally 2 island platforms, later 4 side platforms
- Tracks: 4 tracks

Construction
- Structure type: Elevated

History
- Opened: May 6, 1895
- Closed: April 4, 1954
- Rebuilt: 1898–1914 (platforms reconfigured)

Former services
| Preceding station | Chicago "L" | Following station |
|---|---|---|
| Laflin toward Marshfield | Metropolitan main line | Halsted toward Loop (LaSalle/Van Buren) or Wells Street Terminal |
Location

Racine was a rapid transit station operated by the Chicago "L"'s Metropolitan West Side Elevated Railroad and located on its main line. The station existed from 1895 to 1954, when it and the other stations on the main line were demolished for construction of the Eisenhower Expressway and its Congress Line. A new station at Racine was built on the Congress Line as a replacement.

== History ==
The Metropolitan main line opened on May 6, 1895, and one of its several stations was at Centre Avenue, renamed Racine in 1913 alongside the street itself.

Skip-stop came to the main line on December 9, 1951, and Racine was designated a "B" station. This lasted until September 1953, when it was upgraded to an "AB" station.

Logan Square (and Humboldt Park) trains were rerouted from elevated trackage to the new Milwaukee-Dearborn subway in 1951, and thus no longer needed the station, and Garfield Park trains started using temporary at-grade trackage in 1953. Douglas Park trains started using the Paulina Connector to get to the Loop on April 4, 1954, removing the last traffic to Racine and resulting in its closure and that of Marshfield. After the change, Douglas Park riders needing to transfer to westbound Garfield Park trains were advised to use the Madison/Wells station in the Loop, whereas eastbound Garfield Park riders headed for Douglas Park were recommended to switch at State/Van Buren. The new Congress Line was built with a Racine station as a replacement.

== Station details ==
Racine's station house was built of red pressed brick with a stone sill and foundation. Having a flat elevation, it had painted walls and a hardwood floor, as well as a restroom, water heater, newsstand, and ticket agent's booth.

The stairways and platforms of the station were wooden atop steel girders. The main line was quadruple-tracked throughout its length; its stations, including Racine, originally had two island platforms between an inner and outer track. This proved to create a hazardous curve on the outer tracks, so the station was reconstructed between 1898 and 1914 to have one side platform for each track. This unorthodox setup was because the station was located one block east of the Metropolitan's Throop Shop, meaning that the pairs of tracks had to separate to go around the shop. It appears that the original southern island platform was repurposed as a side platform at this time.
