= Marshfield station =

Rapid transit station in Chicago, 1895–1954

MARSHFIELD 1700W 400S
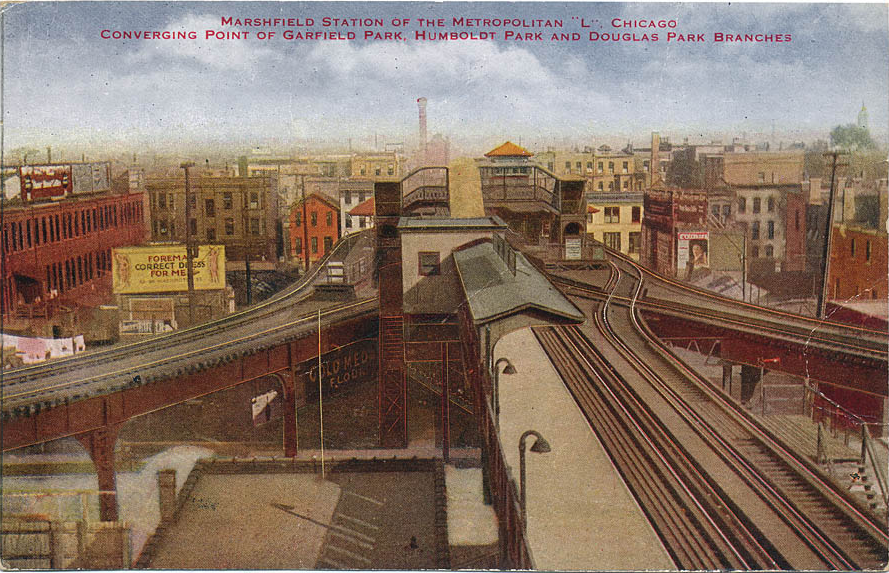
- A pre-WWI view looking east at the station. The AE&C's platform is in the foreground.

General information
- Location: 416 South Marshfield Avenue (Note: This would have been 265 South Marshfield Avenue prior to 1909.); Chicago, Illinois
- Coordinates: 41°52′33″N 87°40′06″W
- Owner: Chicago Transit Authority (1947–1954); Chicago Rapid Transit Company (1924–1947); See text before 1924
- Lines: Metropolitan main line; Chicago Aurora and Elgin Railroad main line
- Platforms: 2 island platforms and 1 side platform
- Tracks: 4 tracks diverging to 6

Construction
- Structure type: Elevated
- Cycle facilities: Yes

History
- Opened: May 6, 1895
- Closed: April 4, 1954

Key dates
- March 11, 1905: AE&C (later CA&E) service introduced
- February 25, 1951: Logan Square and Humboldt Park service discontinued
- September 20 and 27, 1953: Garfield Park and CA&E service discontinued

Passengers
- 1953: 688,413 ▼3.48% (CTA)
- Rank: 68 out of 137

Former services
| Preceding station | Chicago "L" | Following station |
|---|---|---|
| through to Douglas, Garfield Park, and Logan Square branches | Metropolitan main line | Laflin Closed 1951 (Note: Racine after 1951) toward Loop (LaSalle/Van Buren) or Wells Street Terminal |
| Madison Closed 1951 toward Logan Square | Logan Square branch | through to Metropolitan main line |
| Ogden Closed 1953 toward Des Plaines | Garfield Park branch | through to Metropolitan main line |
| Polk toward Oak Park | Douglas branch | through to Metropolitan main line |
| Preceding station | Chicago Aurora and Elgin Railroad | Following station |
| Kedzie Avenue toward Wheaton | Main Line | Canal Street One-way operation |
Track layout
Location

Marshfield was a rapid transit station on the Chicago "L" in service between 1895 and 1954. Constructed by the Metropolitan West Side Elevated Railroad, it was the westernmost station of the Metropolitan's main line, which then diverged into three branches. Marshfield was also served by the Aurora Elgin and Chicago Railway (AE&C) and its descendant the Chicago Aurora and Elgin Railroad (CA&E), an interurban, between 1905 and 1953.

The Metropolitan, one of four companies operating the "L", handed its lines over to the Chicago Elevated Railways (CER) trust in 1911. The companies forming the trust formally merged into the Chicago Rapid Transit Company (CRT) in 1924, which continued operation of the "L" until it was taken over by the publicly-held Chicago Transit Authority (CTA) in 1947. The CA&E had resulted from splitting of the AE&C in 1921.

In the 1950s, overhauls to the Metropolitan's lines, planned since the 1930s, replaced the Logan Square branch with a subway to go directly downtown and substitute a rapid transit right-of-way in the median of the Eisenhower for the main line and Garfield Park branch. Construction of these new lines was piecemeal, as was the end of service to Marshfield; Logan Square trains were diverted in 1951, as was Garfield Park and CA&E service in 1953. This left Douglas Park trains as the sole traffic at Marshfield until April 1954, when they too used a temporary right-of-way to go downtown. The Congress Line opened in 1958; the junction that Marshfield had served was maintained between the new line and the Douglas Park branch, but the station prior to this divergence was located on Racine Avenue, significantly to the east of Marshfield Avenue. An entrance to the Medical Center station on the new line was located on Paulina Street, a block west of Marshfield Avenue.

== History ==
The Metropolitan West Side Elevated Railroad Company was granted a 50-year franchise by the Chicago City Council on April 7, 1892, and began securing right-of-way shortly thereafter. The Metropolitan's operations comprised a main line that went westward from downtown to diverge into three branches – one northwest to Logan Square, one due west to Garfield Park, and one southwest to Douglas Park – and serve various parts of Chicago's west side. A further branch to Humboldt Park proceeded due west from the Logan Square branch past Robey Street. (Note: Technically, the Logan Square branch started after Robey and was, like the Humboldt Park branch, a divergence from what was formally known as the "Northwest branch". However, as early as 1898, even the Metropolitan itself was referring to the Northwest branch as part of the "Logan Square branch", although ridership statistics continued to separate them.) The franchise stipulated that this divergence take place somewhere between Wood Street and Ashland Avenue; the Metropolitan decided to place the junction at Marshfield Avenue, a minor street.

Originally intending for its railroad to be powered by steam locomotives like the competing South Side and Lake Street Elevateds, the Metropolitan decided in May 1894 to use electric traction instead. The tracks had already been largely constructed prior to the decision to electrify them, but retrofitting the third rail proved an easy task besides the switches of the main line. The junction at Marshfield required "elaborate special work" in its switches and signals, more so than other elevated railroads at the time, and has been described as being as late as 1948 "the most elaborate and complex junction on the Chicago elevated system". The main line and Logan Square branch up to Robey had their tracks completed by the middle of October 1894, and were given power in April 1895 for test and inspection runs. They began service at 6 a.m. on Monday, May 6, 1895; eleven stations opened that day, including Marshfield. Upon its opening, the Metropolitan became the first revenue electric elevated railroad in the United States. The Garfield Park branch opened on June 19, but service on the Douglas Park branch was delayed until April 28, 1896.

The Metropolitan Division's routes prior to 1951, with Marshfield station as a gray marker and the Loop in solid black. The Garfield Park branch – the branch heading straight west from the main line – carried CA&E trains to Chicago's western suburbs.

The Metropolitan's lines were originally operated by the West Side Construction Company, which had been responsible for constructing them, and were transferred to the Metropolitan on October 6, 1896. The backers and officers of the two companies were largely identical, however, so this transfer of ownership was nominal. The expenses incurred in constructing this vast trackage would catch up to the Metropolitan, which entered receivership in 1897. The similarly-named Metropolitan West Side Elevated Railway Company was organized in January 1899 and assumed operations on February 3 of that year.

The interurban Aurora Elgin and Chicago Railway (AE&C) was incorporated in 1901 and began service on August 25, 1902, between Aurora and the Garfield Park branch's station on 52nd Avenue – later renamed "Laramie Avenue" – in Chicago. The AE&C and Metropolitan entered a trackage rights agreement in 1905, effective March 11, whereby AE&C trains were allowed to go into downtown Chicago via the Metropolitan's tracks and Wells Street Terminal, and the Metropolitan could extend its service westward on AE&C tracks to its station on Des Plaines Avenue. Having gone bankrupt in 1919 due to rising inflation from World War I and state regulations, the AE&C was split into two parts, one of which was the Chicago Aurora and Elgin Railroad (CA&E), in 1921.

The Metropolitan, along with the other companies operating "L" lines in Chicago, became a part of the Chicago Elevated Railways (CER) trust on July 1, 1911. CER acted as a de facto holding company for the "L" – unifying its operations, instituting the same management across the companies, and instituting free transfers between the lines starting in 1913 – but kept the underlying companies intact. This continued until the companies were formally merged into the single Chicago Rapid Transit Company (CRT), which assumed operations on January 9, 1924; the former Metropolitan was designated the Metropolitan Division of the CRT for administrative purposes. Although municipal ownership of transit had been a hotly-contested issue for half a century, the publicly-owned Chicago Transit Authority (CTA) was not created until 1945, nor given operation of the "L" until October 1, 1947.

=== Closure and demolition ===
Plans for Chicago to have a subway system to relieve the severe congestion of, if not replace, its elevated trackage dated back to the early 20th century, but the city lagged in building subways. A plan emerged in 1938 for a subway to go downtown from the west side; a 1939 plan also introduced the idea of replacing the main line and Garfield Park branch with a section of rapid transit operating through a superhighway (the eventual Interstate 290 or "Eisenhower") on Congress Street that had been proposed since the 1909 Plan of Chicago and more thoroughly planned in the early 1930s. These sections of transit would be connected, allowing for the northwest side's rapid transit to be routed through downtown rather than adhere to a trunk-and-branch model.

Work on the subway was delayed by World War II; it finally opened on February 25, 1951, rerouting Logan Square and Humboldt Park trains from Marshfield Junction. (Note: Earlier plans had called for both the subway and old Logan Square trackage to be used for revenue service, but the CTA abandoned those plans.) Construction on the expressway and Congress Line, on the other hand, had not started even though it had been adopted by the City Council in 1940 and formally authorized for construction in 1946. Clearance of the right-of-way began in 1949 and was largely complete by 1952, by which time only the "L" structure survived in the path of the future expressway. Changes were made to the Garfield Park and Douglas Park lines on December 9, 1951. Several stations were closed, including Laflin to Marshfield's east on the main line. Skip-stop, wherein trains were designated as either "A" trains or "B" trains and stopped at respective "A" or "B" stations, was applied during weekdays to the surviving stations; Marshfield was designated an "all-stop" station under this scheme and was thus unaffected.

As construction progressed, Garfield trains were rerouted from the "L" structure to temporary at-grade trackage running directly on Van Buren Street between Kedzie and Halsted, ceasing to make intermediate stops in that area; this included the main line stations of Marshfield and Racine. In the process, Marshfield became a "B" station and Halsted became the transfer point between Garfield Park and Douglas Park trains. These changes impacted westbound trains on September 20, 1953, and eastbound trains on September 27. The CA&E, having long struggled financially, had serious doubts about its ability to reroute its right-of-way into the new expressway median, and more immediately refused to use the at-grade tracks due to safety concerns as well as the prospect of delays caused by the use of traffic signals at road crossings. Despite some speculative plans for alternative train service to downtown Chicago, and after being barred by state regulators from abandoning rail service altogether in favor of buses, the CA&E ultimately abandoned service east of Des Plaines on September 20. This left Douglas Park trains as the sole remaining traffic for Marshfield and Racine, which remained temporarily open for them.

Douglas Park trains started using the Paulina Connector – the old Logan Square structure, connected to the Lake Street Elevated – to get to the Loop on April 4, 1954, removing the last traffic to Marshfield and Racine; they were demolished soon afterwards. After the change, Douglas Park riders needing to transfer to westbound Garfield Park trains were advised to use the Madison/Wells station in the Loop, whereas eastbound Garfield Park riders headed for Douglas Park were recommended to switch at State/Van Buren. The Congress Line was complete in the area of Marshfield and opened on June 22, 1958, combined with the subway and Douglas Park branch – by then simply the "Douglas" branch – as the new "West-Northwest Route". The route had a new station on Racine Avenue as the final station before the divergence of the Douglas branch from the line. West of the junction, the Medical Center station on the Congress Line contained an auxiliary exit and part-time entrance on Paulina Street, a block west of Marshfield Avenue.

== Station details ==
The station was located at 416 South Marshfield Avenue in the Near West Side neighborhood of Chicago. The Metropolitan boasted of providing water closets, water fountains, newsstands, and waiting rooms at its stations, which also included racks for bicycles, staff to announce those in waiting rooms of approaching trains, and space for baby carriages. Unlike elsewhere on the "L", the Metropolitan's station houses, located at street level, had central heating and basements.

Marshfield had two island platforms, one each between an inner and outer track; after the AE&C began service, an additional side platform was constructed on the northern Garfield Park track west of the junction. A pedestrian bridge linked both "L" platforms and the interurban platform. East of the station, the tracks crossed over and became two bidirectional pairs rather than two pairs in the same direction. Trains bound for or coming from Logan Square and Humboldt Park used the northern tracks and island platform, while trains bound for or coming from Garfield Park and Douglas Park used the southern tracks and platform. Three switches existed at this interlocking, all of which were hand-thrown. The junction's switches and signals were constructed by the Paige Iron Works of Chicago. The tower for the junction was located on the southern platform. West of Marshfield, another junction involved the Douglas Park branch diverging from the Garfield Park tracks. This divergence, combined with the crossover, has led to descriptions of the junction as "actually consist[ing] of two junctions".

=== Operations ===
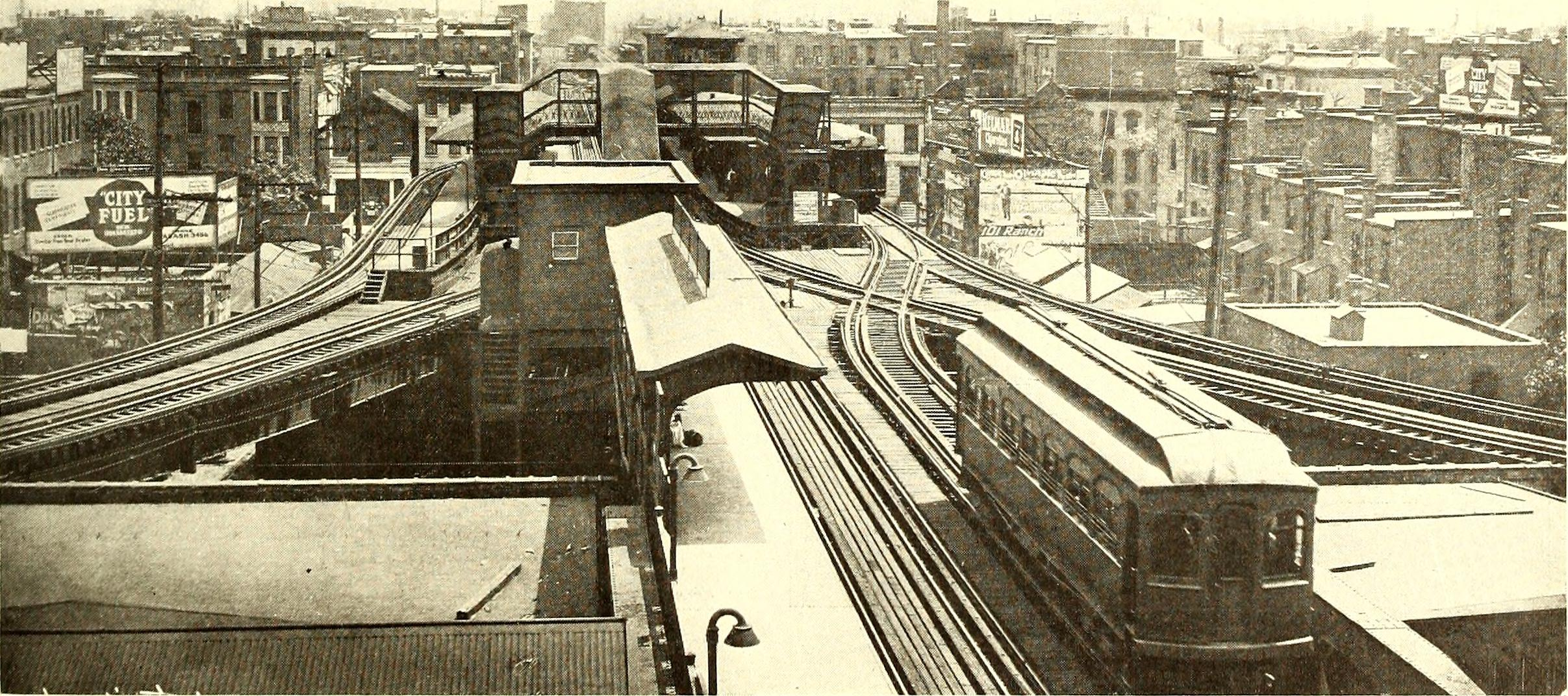
An eastbound AE&C train approaches Marshfield in 1911, while an eastbound Garfield Park or Douglas Park train occupies the southern platform.

As originally opened, the Metropolitan's trains ran every six minutes between 6 a.m. and 6:30 p.m., and every ten minutes during the night, on the main line and Northwest branch; the average speed was 16 mph (26 km/h). By 1898, the night hours were updated so that trains ran at 30-minute intervals on each branch, or 7.5 minutes on the main line. Trains running on the Westchester branch, which was a western extension of the Garfield Park branch opened in 1926, did not stop at Marshfield, instead running express from Canal on the main line to Laramie on the Garfield Park branch.

The CA&E stopped at Marshfield to board westbound passengers and alight eastbound passengers; lest it compete with the "L" directly, patrons were not allowed to board eastbound trains at Marshfield, nor were westbound passengers allowed to alight at stations within the "L"'s area of service. As early as 1934, several morning rush hour CA&E trains a day stopped at Laflin instead of Marshfield to discharge eastbound passengers. By 1950, such trains, now the majority of morning rush hour trains, instead used Ogden for eastbound alightment, although the remainder of CA&E trains continued eastbound alightment at Marshfield. CA&E trains were limited to 45 mph (72 km/h) on "L" tracks, but were given priority over slower "L" train at the crossover east of Marshfield.

Station agents on the Metropolitan were originally on duty 24 hours a day; fare collection by on-train conductors was adopted on various Metropolitan branches for night and off-peak hours during the 20th century, although the main line maintained 24-hour station agents throughout its existence. Unlike other elevated railroads at the time, the Metropolitan did not sell tickets for passengers to present to staff; instead customers gave their fare to the station agent to record in a registry, a practice similar to streetcars. This practice was ultimately adopted by the other elevateds. The CA&E, on the other hand, sold tickets to be checked by conductors. Tickets could be purchased either at a station or on the train; full-fare tickets sold on trains came with a dime ($1.34 in 2025) surcharge over those bought in advance.

=== Neighborhood and connections ===
A working-class neighborhood grew up around the station, supplanting what had been a fashionable area. Underneath the CA&E platform was the Dreamland Ballroom, a venue that was at one time owned by the CRT. Located near the station was the Coyne Electrical School and the Presbyterian Hospital, and the headquarters of the retail cataloger Alden's. By the 1940s, the neighborhood was inhabited by people of African, Greek, Italian, Jewish, and Mexican ancestry; it was considered blighted by officials and the public, but residents contested that description.

A streetcar ran on Ashland Avenue by the late 19th century; in the vicinity of the station, it turned west to run north from Paulina Street to avoid running on a boulevard, before turning back east to Ashland. By the early- to mid-20th century, this route was one of the "Big Five" streetcar lines in Chicago, which had the highest ridership, received the most amenities, and had the shortest wait times. Another streetcar route ran on Van Buren Street adjacent to the Metropolitan's tracks, being powered by horse until it was electrified in 1896. As of 1928, both routes had owl service. Buses replaced streetcars on Van Buren in 1951; the eastbound Van Buren streetcar track remained until it was removed to construct the temporary westbound Garfield Park "L" track, but the westbound track survived through the highway construction and opening of the Congress Line. Ashland's streetcars were replaced by buses in 1952 for weekend service, and in 1954 altogether.

=== Ridership ===
In 1900, the earliest year data is available, Marshfield served 499,538 "L" passengers. Afterwards, ridership steadily increased until it peaked at 1,538,319 in 1926. Ridership last exceeded one million in 1929 before declining substantially to roughly 1900s levels. In the last full year of its operation, 1953, Marshfield served 688,433 passengers on the "L", a 3.48 percent decline from the 713,264 of 1951; ridership statistics are unavailable throughout the entire "L" for 1952. For the part of 1954 it was open, Marshfield served 135,928 passengers.

For 1953, Marshfield was in the exact middle of the main line's ridership, surpassing Racine and Franklin/Van Buren but underperforming Canal and Halsted. With respect to the "L" system as a whole, Marshfield's 1951 performance made it the 65th-busiest of 131 stations that were at least partially-staffed at the beginning of the year, while in 1953 it was the 68th-busiest of 137 such stations. Accounting for the part of 1954 it was open, it had the 114th-highest patronage out of those 137 stations. (Note: The Humboldt Park, Normal Park, and Westchester branches, which all closed in the 1950s, had all of their stations unstaffed by 1951 in favor of fare collection by on-train conductors, meaning that their stations did not collect ridership statistics. The Garfield Park branch likewise did not collect ridership statistics by station in its final years. Several stations closed on the "L" in 1951, while Central Park station was opened that year to replace several stations on the Douglas Park branch. Ridership statistics for stations on the Lake Street Elevated and through stations on the Kenwood branch, last recorded in 1948 and 1949 respectively, returned in 1953.) These statistics only measured the number of passengers who originated a trip from Marshfield rather than used it as a transfer, so are likely underestimates of the true patronage of the station.

Although the CA&E did not collect ridership statistics by station, the railroad's total ridership was less than four million annually, and declining, in the period from 1949. (Note: By comparison, Washington, the busiest station on the "L", consistently served more than eight million annual passengers alone throughout the 1950s, and exceeded nine million in the latter half of the decade.) After the September 1953 suspension of direct "one-seat ride" service into Chicago, the railroad lost half of these riders by December as riders opted instead for the nearby Chicago and North Western Railroad (C&NW, modern-day Union Pacific West Line) or automobiles to get into the city. Faced with this onslaught, the CA&E discontinued passenger service altogether at midday on July 3, 1957. Passengers who had taken the morning trains to Chicago were caught unaware by this development and had to find alternative transportation home.

== Works cited ==
- "The Metropolitan West Side Elevated Railroad of Chicago". The Street Railway Review. 5: 263–274. January 15, 1895.
- Borzo, Greg (2007). The Chicago "L". Charleston, South Carolina: Arcadia. ISBN 9780738551005 – via Google Books.
- "Chicago Rapid Transit Company: Metropolitan Division" (PDF). Bulletins of the Central Electric Railfans' Association (2). Chicago: Central Electric Railfans' Association. February 1939.
- Public Information Department (1967). Congress Rapid Transit. Chicago: Chicago Transit Authority – via Internet Archive.
- Operations Planning Department (October 1, 1979). Rail System Annual Traffic: Originating passengers only (Report). Chicago: Chicago Transit Authority – via Internet Archive.
- Lind, Alan R. (1974). Chicago Surface Lines: An Illustrated History. Park Forest, Illinois: Transport History Press.
- Moffat, Bruce G. (1995). The "L": The Development of Chicago's Rapid Transit System, 1888–1932. Chicago: Central Electric Railfans' Association. ISBN 0-915348-30-6.
- Plan of Renumbering, City of Chicago (PDF). Chicago: The Chicago Directory Company. August 1909. Archived from the original (PDF) on February 25, 2012 – via Chicago History Museum.
- "R. L. Polk & Co.'s Chicago Street and Avenue Guide" (PDF). Polk's Chicago Directory 1923. Chicago: R. L. Polk & Co. 1923. pp. 193–228 – via ChicagoAncestors.org.
- Weller, Peter; Stark, Fred (1999). The Living Legacy of the Chicago Aurora and Elgin. San Francisco: Forum Press. ISBN 0-945213-41-7 – via Internet Archive.
