= Metropolitan main line =

Segment of the Chicago "L" (1895–1958)

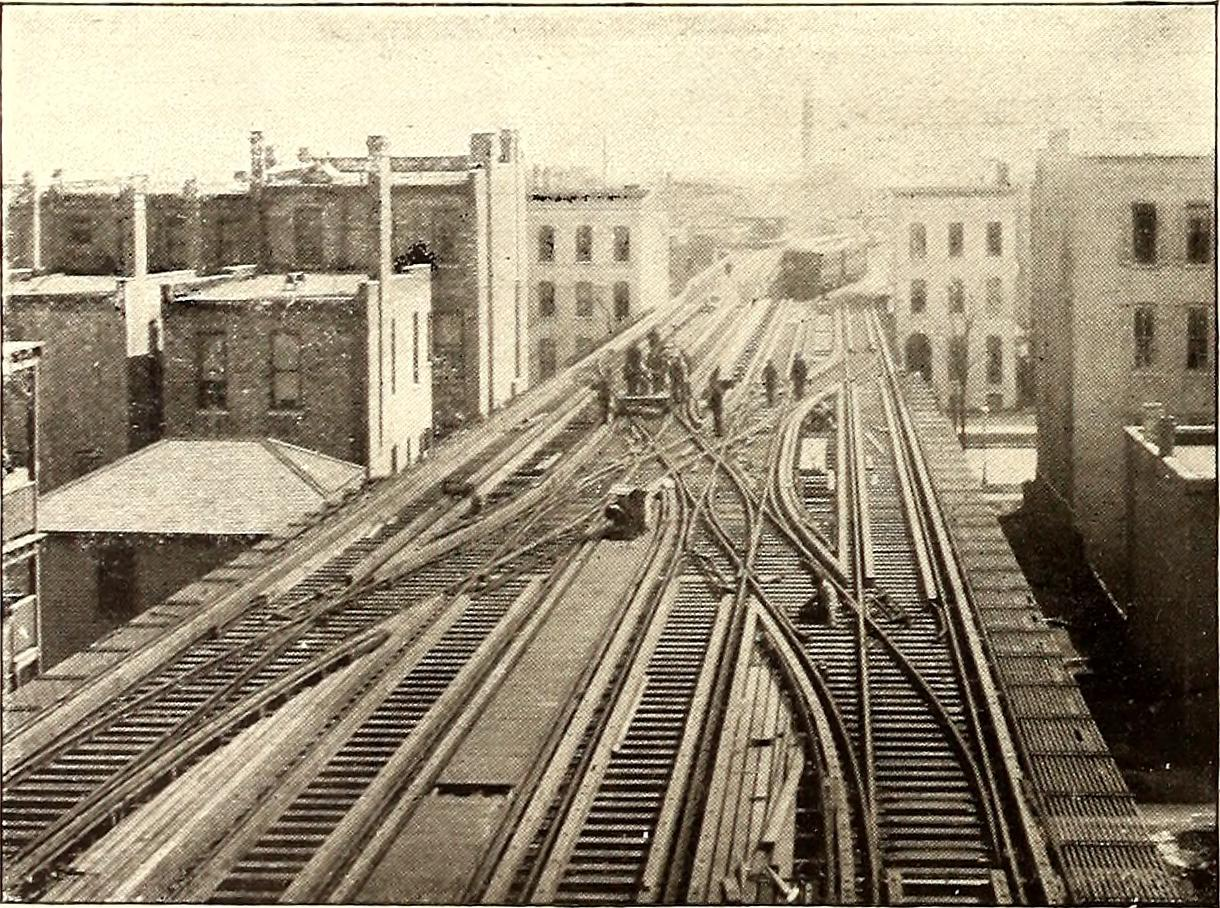
- The four tracks of the Metropolitan Main in 1895

Overview
- Locale: Chicago, Illinois, U.S.
- Termini: Wells Street Terminal and Loop; Marshfield
- Stations: 8

Service
- Type: Rapid transit
- System: Chicago "L"
- Operator(s): Chicago Transit Authority (1947–1958); Chicago Rapid Transit Company (1924–1947); Metropolitan West Side Elevated Railroad (1895–1924)

History
- Opened: May 6, 1895; 131 years ago
- Closed: June 22, 1958; 68 years ago

Technical
- Character: Elevated
- Track gauge: 4 ft 8 1/2 in (1,435 mm)
- Electrification: Third rail, 600 V DC
Route map
Metropolitan main line highlighted in gray, including the entrance to the Wells Street Terminal

The Metropolitan main line was a rapid transit line of the Chicago "L" system from 1895 to 1958. It ran west from downtown to a junction at Marshfield station. At this point the Garfield Park branch continued westward, while the Douglas Park branch turned south, and the Logan Square branch turned north with the Humboldt Park branch branching from it. In addition to serving the Chicago "L", its tracks and those of the Garfield Park branch also carried the Chicago Aurora and Elgin Railroad, an interurban that served Chicago's western suburbs, between 1905 and 1953.

The main line and its associated branches were originally operated by the Metropolitan West Side Elevated Railroad, one of four companies that built what would become the Chicago "L". After the four companies were merged into the Chicago Rapid Transit Company (CRT), the Metropolitan's former holdings became known as the "Metropolitan Division" of the CRT. This arrangement continued until the Chicago "L" was brought under municipal control with the Chicago Transit Authority (CTA) in 1947.

The main line had a total of seven stations – Wells Street Terminal, Franklin/Van Buren, Canal, Halsted, Racine, Laflin, and Marshfield – between 1904 and 1951, in addition to the stations of the Loop also served by Metropolitan trains. After the Logan Square branch was rerouted through the newly constructed Dearborn Street Subway in 1951, the main line was merged with the Garfield Park branch and both collectively became known as the Garfield Park Line or Garfield Line.

The Dearborn Subway was constructed from the late 1930s to 1951 to replace the Logan Square branch's entry into downtown via the main line, and the Congress branch would be finished in 1958 in the median of the Eisenhower Expressway to replace the Garfield Line, which was demolished to make way for them. The Congress branch contained stations designed to replace those on the Garfield Line. Both the Dearborn Street Subway and Congress branch are parts of the modern-day Blue Line while the Douglas operates as the Pink Line.

== History ==
The Metropolitan West Side Elevated Railroad Company was granted a 50-year franchise by the Chicago City Council on April 7, 1892, and began securing right of way shortly thereafter. The Metropolitan's operations comprised a main line that went west from downtown to Marshfield, where three branches – one northwest to Logan Square, one due west to Garfield Park, and one southwest to Douglas Park – diverged and served various parts of Chicago's west side. A further branch to Humboldt Park proceeded due west from the Logan Square branch just past Robey Street. (Note: Technically, the Logan Square branch started after Robey and was, like the Humboldt Park branch, a divergence from what was formally known as the "Northwest branch". However, as early as 1898, even the Metropolitan itself was referring to the Northwest branch as part of the "Logan Square branch", although ridership statistics continued to separate them.)

Unlike the competing South Side and Lake Street Elevateds, the Metropolitan never used steam traction. Although it had originally intended to, and indeed had built much of its structure under the assumption that locomotives would be used, it decided in May 1894 to have electrified tracks instead. making it upon its opening the first revenue electric elevated railroad in the United States. This made it the first rapid transit in the United States to use electric motors for revenue service. In order to provide power for the line, a shop at Loomis Street was built in the middle of the Metropolitan's main line, which continued to operate until 1914. After 1914, the Metropolitan purchased electricity from Commonwealth Edison, but the Loomis shop would remain standing until the construction of the Congress street expressway.

The main line opened on May 6, 1895; trains initially ran from Canal to Marshfield. The Franklin Street Terminal opened on May 13, extending the line eastward across the Chicago River. The river crossing made the Metropolitan the only "L" to own and operate its own drawbridge, in contrast to other "L"s using street bridges to cross the river. This terminal was closed in 1897, as the line was routed to the Loop via Van Buren Street. The Loop would prove to be frequently over capacity, and the Metropolitan was forced to turn some downtown-bound trains back at Canal starting in 1900, constructing a special platform extension and track stub for the purpose. The Chicago City Council granted the Metropolitan permission to construct a terminal on Fifth Avenue in 1902, and the terminal would be completed in 1904 to carry overfill from the Loop.

The Metropolitan's franchise was amended on February 23, 1905, to allow for the carrying of surface railroads on its tracks. The Aurora Elgin & Chicago Railway (AE&C) began to use the Garfield Park branch and main line to access the Fifth Avenue terminal on March 11. The AE&C had been associated with the Metropolitan since 1902, when both railroads used the Garfield Park branch's Laramie station. In 1912, Fifth Avenue was renamed back to its original Wells Street, and so was the terminal. In 1923, the AE&C reorganized as the Chicago Aurora & Elgin Railroad (CA&E).

The Metropolitan was one of four companies operating the modern-day Chicago "L" in the late 19th and early 20th centuries, alongside the South Side Elevated, Lake Street Elevated, and Northwestern Elevated Railroad. The four lines were brought under a common management in 1913, and were formally merged in 1924 under the Chicago Rapid Transit Company. At that point, the former Metropolitan's operations became part of the Metropolitan Division of the CRT.

The publicly owned CTA replaced the CRT, which had proven chronically unprofitable, in 1947, having been chartered for the purpose by the Illinois General Assembly in 1945. By this time, the Congress Street branch, a project to include rapid transit in the median of the Congress Street superhighway to replace the main line and Garfield Park branch, was underway, and the CTA entered negotiations regarding its construction.

== Operation ==
The main line was an extremely busy place in the late 1940s and early 1950s; in 1948, several trains on each track were within eyesight of one another during rush hours. The line was approximately 1.5 miles (2.4 km) in length between Market Junction and Marshfield Junction, and had multiple curves, such that the longest section of straight track was less than 0.5 miles (0.80 km) long. Trains often braked for curves which had speed restrictions of 15 mph (24 km/h) or less; signals were used in "blind curves" where following trains were unable to look ahead. The tracks were numbered 1 through 4 from north to south; tracks 1 and 3 were used for express operations for respective outbound and inbound trains that did not make stops during rush hours, while tracks 2 and 4 were for the respective outbound and inbound locals.

Track map of the main line west of Laflin, per Weller and Stark

Key

=== Rolling stock ===
569 wooden cars were built for the Metropolitan's operations between 1894 and 1907, by the builders Pullman, Harlan & Hollingsworth, American Car & Foundry, Barney & Smith, and Jewett. In the early 20th century, the Metropolitan decided to offer funeral trains on its lines, entering into an agreement with the CA&E to carry such trains to Oak Ridge and Mount Carmel cemeteries. One funeral car was built specifically for the purpose, and another retrofitted after the concept proved successful. After the decline of the funeral car business, the retrofitted unit was converted once again, into a medical examining station. Arising and benefiting from the poor road conditions in Chicago's western suburbs, the service carried an average of 22 trains a week by October 1907. Laflin was rebuilt to have a specially dedicated elevator for caskets to load onto the funeral trains. The service declined and was discontinued in the 1930s, but the Chicago Transit Authority (CTA)'s charter continues to allow it to run funeral trains.

In 1950, 6000-series cars were assigned to the Logan Square branch, which were rerouted through the Dearborn Street Subway after 1951. The Douglas branch received 6000-series cars in 1952, and both the Douglas branch and Garfield Line received 4000-series cars in 1955, at which point wooden cars were retired from the Garfield Line but kept on the Douglas branch, although by 1957 they had been retired there as well.

=== Stations and skip-stop ===
The stations on the main line originally consisted of two island platforms with each in between an outer track and an inner track. The sharpness of the curves of the outer tracks' bowing out to accommodate the platforms, however, was considered dangerous and some of the stations were reconfigured between 1898 and 1914. The results of these modifications varied widely by station; at Racine, it resulted in two pairs of side platforms for the northern and southern pairs of tracks, separated from one another by the Throop Street Shop, while at Halsted an island platform was placed in between the two inner tracks with two side platforms each for the outer tracks. At Marshfield, the northern platform and tracks were used for trains going to and coming from the Logan Square branch, whereas the southern platform and tracks were used for trains going to and coming from the Garfield Park and Douglas Park branches.

Metropolitan main line stations
Station	Location	Notes	Opened	Closed	Skip-stop designation
Wells Street Terminal	314 S. Wells Street	Also served by the CA&E	October 3, 1904	February 25, 1951	All-stop
Franklin Street Terminal	Franklin Street between Jackson Boulevard and Van Buren Street		May 13, 1895	1897	–
Franklin/Van Buren	Franklin Street and Van Buren Street		October 11, 1897	October 11, 1955	All-stop
Canal	Canal Street between Jackson and Van Buren Streets	Also served by the CA&E	May 6, 1895	June 22, 1958	All-stop
Halsted	Halsted Street and Van Buren Street	Replaced by UIC–Halsted on Congress Line	May 6, 1895	1958	A
Racine	416-18 S. Racine Avenue	Replaced by Racine on Congress Line	May 6, 1895	April 5, 1954	B
Laflin	418 S. Laflin Street		May 6, 1895	December 9, 1951	–
Marshfield	418 S. Marshfield Avenue	Also served by the CA&E	May 6, 1895	1954	All-stop (1951 –1953); B (1953–1954)

== Replacement by Congress branch ==
The final days of the main line; Halsted is depicted on the left with a 6000-series train approaching it, and the replacement Halsted station (now UIC-Halsted) on the right under construction in the overpass. This image was taken on June 14, 1958, a week prior to the main line's closure.

A highway radiating west from downtown Chicago via Congress Street was proposed in the 1909 Plan of Chicago, which envisioned Congress as Chicago's "grand axis" and a boulevard from Grant Park to Halsted Street. The plan, which did not incorporate rapid transit into the boulevard plan, did not ultimately materialize, but provided inspiration to planners in subsequent decades. Traffic congestion was dire in cities such as Chicago by the 1920s and 1930s, especially on its west side, and superhighways were designed to alleviate it. Such highways were also designed to clear neighborhoods that were considered blighted slums. The Old Chicago Main Post Office was greatly expanded in 1932; built in the way of the proposed superhighway, it was constructed with a hole in its bottom to allow for traffic to run through it, which would be used in when the expressway was completed.

The first proposal to link a Congress highway with the "L" was made in 1939 as part of a grant agreement with the federal government in securing the funding for the State Street and Dearborn Street subways, and the Chicago City Council formally adopted the route on October 31, 1940. In October 1939 it was still planned to have the Congress street extension of the Dearborn Street Subway connect with the elevated structure at Halsted, but it eventually became inevitable that a superhighway plan would necessitate the removal of the main line and Garfield Park branch.

World War II interrupted plans to construct the Dearborn Street Subway; although the federal government allowed the continued construction of the State Street Subway, it did not do so for the Dearborn Street Subway. After the City Council designated the Congress street subway an official project of the city on June 13, 1945, it formally authorized its construction on December 30, 1946. Various negotiations between the City, the CTA, Cook County, and the state of Illinois regarding the right-of-way of the project were conducted between 1951 and 1954. In the final settlement of those negotiations, the City assumed responsibility for the expressway and rapid transit facilities in between the Chicago River and Laramie Avenue; in exchange, the CTA granted the City and Cook County a permanent easement on the right-of-way of the Metropolitan main line and Garfield Park branch between Desplaines Street and Sacramento Boulevard to construct the facilities, and agreed to demolish the elevated structures at its own expense.

The Dearborn Street Subway opened on February 25, 1951, and the Logan Square branch was routed through it. As the connection between its terminal at LaSalle and the Congress Street expressway had not yet been constructed, its trains were forced to turn around at LaSalle. The Douglas Park and Garfield Park branches continued to go downtown through the main line. After this point, the main line and Garfield Park branch were formally merged into a single line known as the "Garfield Park Line" or "Garfield Line". Skip-stop service was implemented on the Garfield Line during rush-hour service starting on December 9, 1951. Laflin was closed on that date, but in contrast to other lines such as the Lake Street Elevated and North-South route where the introduction of skip-stop coincided with the mass closure of lightly used stations, the other stations remained open in anticipation of their demolition.

Starting on September 20, 1953, the Garfield Line was rerouted onto temporary street-level trackage between Sacramento and Aberdeen Avenue. The difficulties resulting from this construction activity caused the CA&E to cease operations east of Desplaines, requiring its passengers to transfer to CTA trains at Desplaines. The CA&E would shut down altogether on July 3, 1957. This also resulted in the restriction of service of Racine and Marshfield to Douglas Park trains, and non-stop service between Kedzie and Halsted. It also led to the discontinuation of skip-stop service on the line, with all trains resuming making stops at all stations. Originally applying only to westbound trains, these changes applied to eastbound trains starting one week later.

Racine and Marshfield both closed to Douglas Park trains in 1954. Franklin/Van Buren station and the Wells Street Terminal closed in 1955; trains on the line entered the Loop from a specially constructed track just south of Quincy station after this point. The Garfield Line closed on June 22, 1958, upon the opening of the Congress branch. The Congress branch was noted as the world's first rapid transit in the median of an expressway, a claim that it disputes with the Cahuenga Parkway in Los Angeles. The Congress branch's time between Forest Park and downtown was 17 minutes faster than the equivalent distance on the old Garfield Line.

On the Congress branch, Halsted (now UIC-Halsted) and Racine were explicitly designed to replace their respective stations on the Garfield Line. In addition, Illinois Medical District replaced three stations on the Garfield Line, including Marshfield, and Racine has an entrance on Loomis Street one block east of Laflin.

== Works cited ==
- "The Metropolitan West Side Elevated Railroad of Chicago". The Street Railway Review. 5: 263–274. January 15, 1895.
- Borzo, Greg (2007). The Chicago "L". Arcadia. ISBN 9780738551005 – via Google Books.
- CTA Rail Entrance, Annual Traffic, 1900–1979 (Report). Chicago: Chicago Transit Authority. October 1, 1979.
- Elevated Railway Employees, Division 308 (1940). The Story of the Chicago Rapid Transit Lines. Chicago: Chicago Rapid Transit Company – via Archive.org.
- Public Information Department (1967). Congress Rapid Transit. Chicago: Chicago Transit Authority – via Archive.org.
- Moffat, Bruce G. (1995). The "L": The Development of Chicago's Rapid Transit System, 1888–1932. Chicago: Central Electric Railfans' Association. ISBN 0-915348-30-6.
- Weller, Peter; Stark, Fred (1999). The Living Legacy of the Chicago Aurora and Elgin. San Francisco: Forum Press. ISBN 0-945213-41-7 – via Internet Archive.
