= UIC–Halsted station =

Chicago "L" station

UIC-Halsted 800W 430S
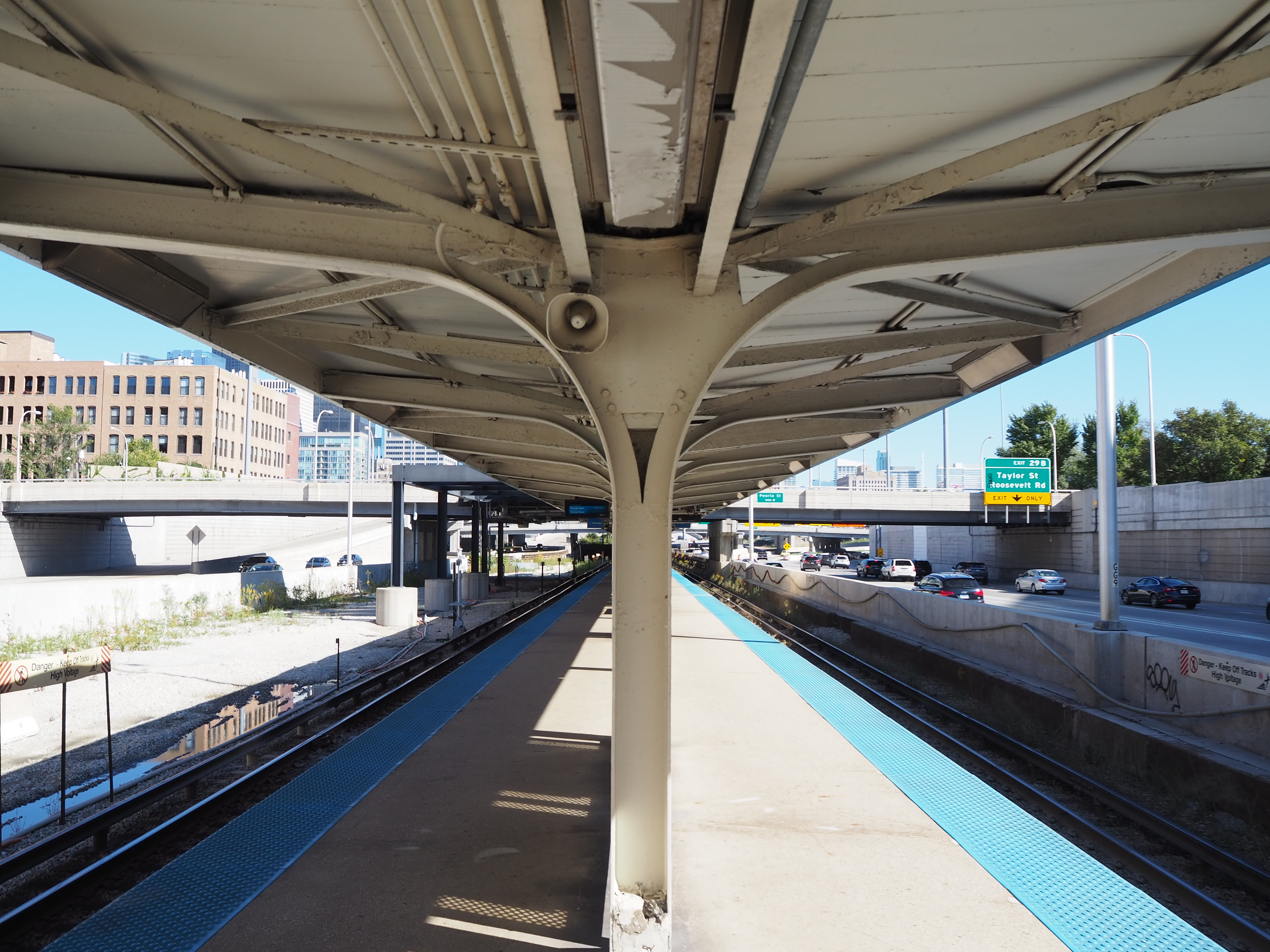

General information
- Location: 430 South Halsted Street; Chicago, Illinois 60607
- Coordinates: 41.8755°N 87.6497°W
- Owner: Chicago Transit Authority
- Line: Forest Park Branch
- Platforms: 1 island platform
- Tracks: 2
- Connections: CTA Bus

Construction
- Structure type: Expressway median
- Cycle facilities: Yes
- Accessible: Yes

History
- Opened: June 22, 1958; 68 years ago
- Rebuilt: 1965 (Peoria entrance added); 2000–2001; 2014–2016 (Peoria entrance renovated, elevator added)
- Former names: Halsted; U of I–Halsted

Passengers
- 2025: 1,172,124 ▲15.9%

Services
Preceding station	Chicago "L"	Following station
Racine toward Forest Park	Blue Line	Clinton toward O'Hare
Track layout
Location

UIC–Halsted, (formerly Halsted and U of I-Halsted) is a Chicago "L" station on the CTA's Blue Line. The station serves the University of Illinois Chicago, the University Village neighborhood, and the Greektown neighborhood all located in the Near West Side.

== History ==
The original Halsted station on the Metropolitan Main Line, the predecessor of the Congress line, opened in 1895, consisting of 4 tracks and two island platforms as trains from all of the Metropolitan "L" lines entered downtown. The original station closed in 1958 as the new replacement station was built as a part of the Congress Line in the median of the Congress Expressway which replaced the Garfield Park branch and the Metropolitan Main Line that were located along an alley in the right of way that is now on the present Eisenhower Expressway. Like the other stations on the Congress Line (and the future Dan Ryan Line and O'Hare Line on the Kennedy Expressway) the station has a single island platform. When the station originally opened, its name was just "Halsted" like its predecessor. In 1965, when the University of Illinois' Chicago campus opened, the station's name was changed to "U of I-Halsted" and an additional entrance/exit to Peoria Street was added to access the campus. Most older signage on the station's platform and some older Chicagoans still refer the station and the campus as U of I-Halsted and U of I, respectively. When the university was renamed as UIC in 1982, the station's name was changed to the current "UIC–Halsted". This change is reflected on CTA maps and signage.

== Location ==
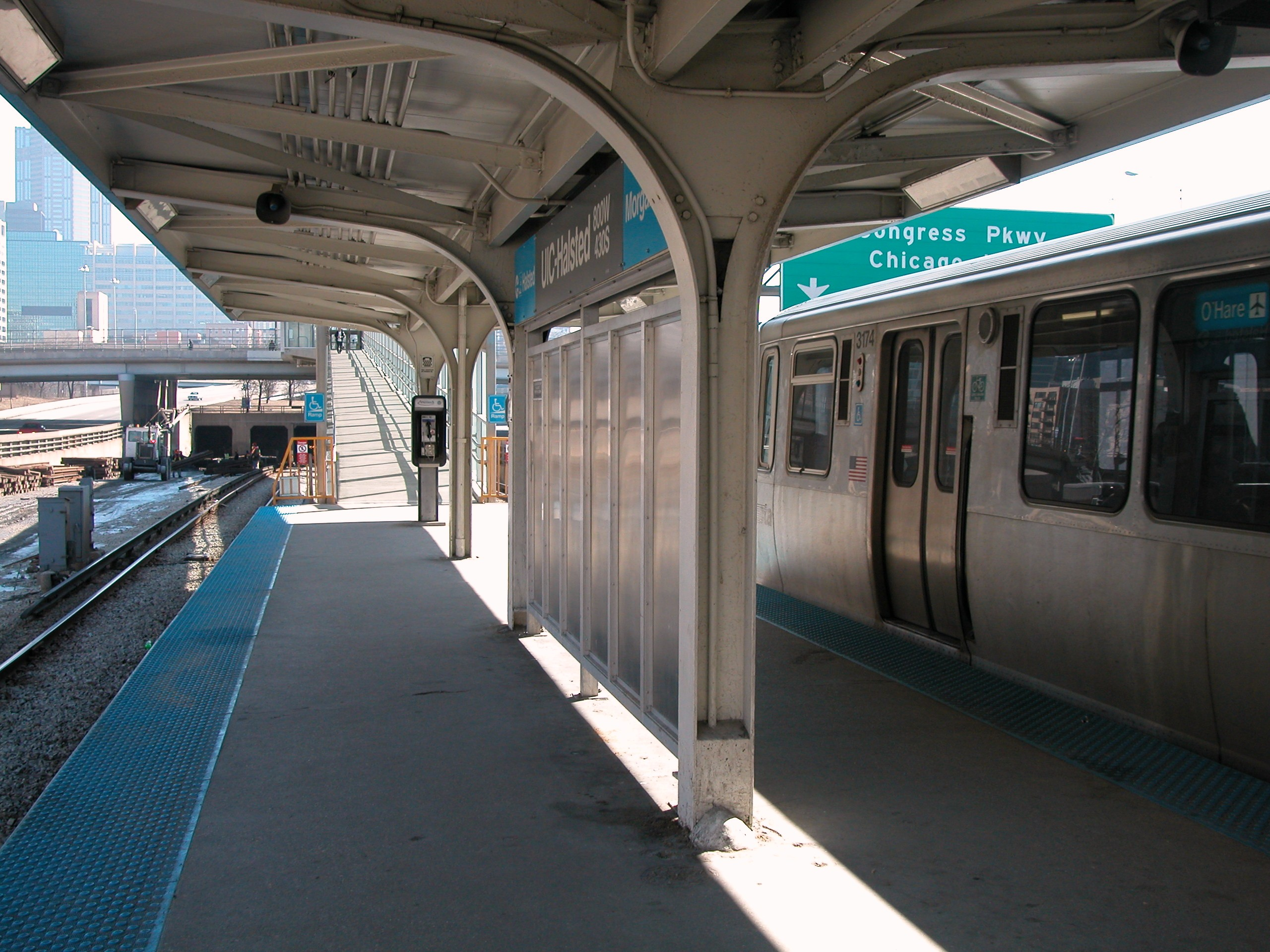
Looking east toward the ramp to Halsted Street, March 2003

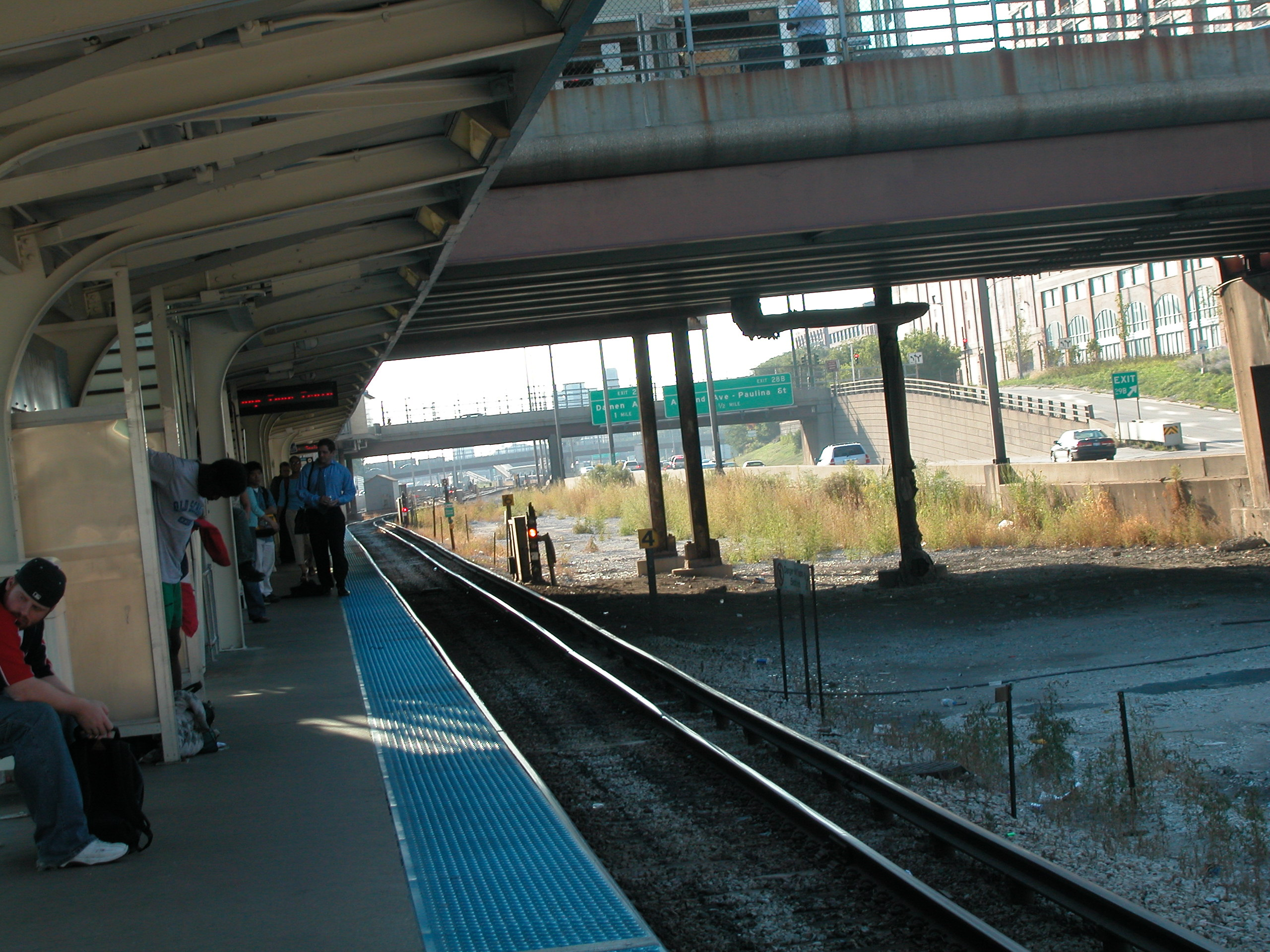
Looking west near the Peoria Street underpass, September 2003

The Eisenhower Expressway median at the UIC–Halsted stop is twice as wide as necessary to accommodate the two tracks and platform, which are offset to only occupy the south half of the available median space. The Peoria Street station house was constructed in 1964, centered not over the platform, but over the median to accommodate the anticipated future high-level subway line to run from there, under Clinton Street and the abandoned Jackson Boulevard streetcar tunnel under the river, to Grant Park. The station house's position and the two extra portals east of Halsted Street were all that came of that plan. Non-electrified tracks were later added in the empty space in the northern portion of the median in order to stage materials and work cars for tunnel repair and maintenance. West of this station also exists stub tracks, used for trains that short turn at UIC–Halsted. This service pattern is used for approximately every other train during off-peak periods.

== Amenities ==
The station has three entrances: Halsted Street, Morgan Street, and Peoria Street. The station house at Morgan Street has a large enclosed waiting room, with electronic signage that alerts passengers when trains are approaching the platform below. The Halsted Street station house has a Chase ATM. The Peoria Street entrance/exit was renovated from June 2014 to August 2015 and reopened on August 31, 2015, with the elevator at the Peoria entrance going into service on May 24, 2016.

== Bus connections ==
CTA

- 7 Harrison (weekdays only)
- 8 Halsted
- 60 Blue Island/26th (Owl Service)
- 126 Jackson
