= Wells Street Terminal =

Rail terminal in Chicago, 1904–1953

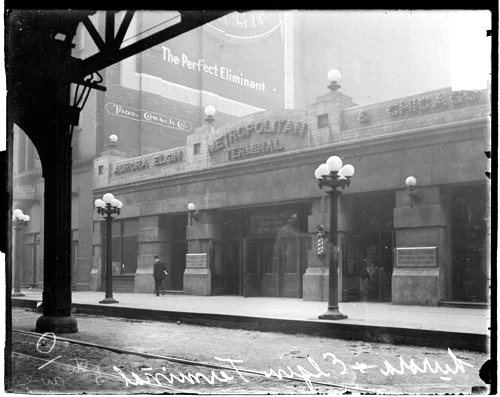
- The terminal prior to reconstruction

General information
- Location: 314 South Wells Street; Chicago, Illinois 60606
- Coordinates: 41.8777°N 87.6338°W
- Owner: Chicago Transit Authority
- Platforms: 2 Island platforms, 1 Side platform
- Tracks: 4

Construction
- Structure type: Elevated

History
- Opened: October 3, 1904
- Closed: September 20, 1953
- Former names: Fifth Avenue Terminal

Former services
Preceding station	Chicago Aurora and Elgin Railroad	Following station
Canal Street toward Wheaton	Main Line	Terminus
Preceding station	Chicago "L"	Following station
Canal toward Marshfield	Metropolitan main line	Terminus
Track layout
Location

Wells Street Terminal was a stub-end downtown terminal on the 'L' in Chicago, Illinois, located at Wells Street between Jackson Boulevard and Van Buren Street. The terminal was in operation from 1904 to 1953.

== History ==
The Fifth Avenue Terminal (as it was originally known) was built by the Metropolitan West Side Elevated Railroad in 1904 to establish a terminal for rush hour elevated train traffic. Along with Chicago's other elevated railroad operators, the Metropolitan operated most of its trains on the Loop elevated through Chicago's central business district. However, the tracks of the Loop 'L' were operating at capacity during rush hours, and could not handle the additional train traffic needed to satisfy demand. Accordingly, the Metropolitan ran some of its rush hour services to Wells Street Terminal instead of circling the Loop. The new Fifth Avenue terminal was built a block east of the earlier Franklin Street Terminal and was in service by October 1904. Similar terminals were used by the other elevated railroad operators of Chicago, but the Metropolitan's Wells Street Terminal had the advantage of being directly adjacent to the Loop "L" tracks on Wells Street and even had a transfer bridge to the Quincy Street station on the Loop 'L'.

The Metropolitan's services included trains operating on its Garfield Park main line, the Douglas Park branch, and the Logan Square and Humboldt Park branch. These lines are ancestors of Chicago Transit Authority's present-day Blue and Pink Line services, though only small remnants of the original lines remain as part of today's Blue Line route.

In 1905, the Metropolitan's elevated trains at the terminal were joined by the interurban trains of the Aurora Elgin and Chicago Railway. The terminal was the only downtown facility used by the interurban, which did not use the Loop.

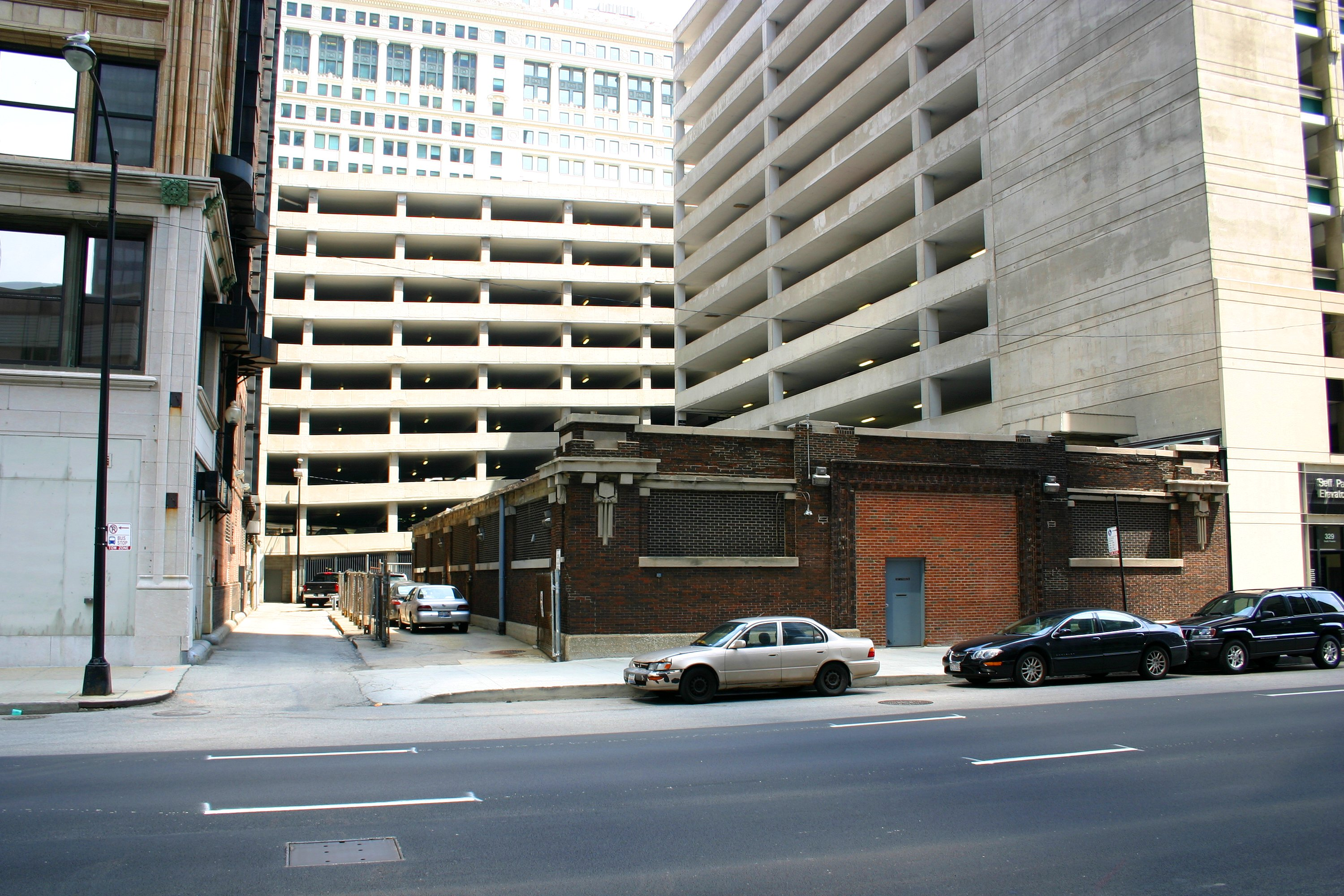
The Franklin Street Substation is all that remains of the former terminal

Wells Street Terminal consisted of four stub-end tracks using two island platforms and in 1907, over 100 rush-hour trains used the facility.

With the completion of the Milwaukee-Dearborn subway in 1951, Logan Square trains were rerouted into the subway, terminating at the temporary terminal LaSalle/Congress subway station. With changing traffic patterns and increasing use of automobiles resulting in lower train frequencies, CTA was able to end 'L' service to the terminal late the same year.

After the CTA took over 'L' operations after World War II, service to the Wells Street Terminal was decreased as operations were revised. In 1948, Humboldt Park branch service was cut back to Damen at all hours except during rush hour, when the trains served Wells Street Terminal. At the same time, all Logan Square trains were routed onto the Loop, leaving only Humboldt trains and certain Garfield and Douglas runs serving Wells. On February 25, 1951, all Milwaukee (Logan Square) trains were rerouted into the new Milwaukee-Dearborn Subway, with all Humboldt service to a shuttle operation to Damen. Later that year, on December 9, Garfield and Douglas service was revised and those services were also withdrawn from Well Street Terminal, thus ending all 'L' service to the station.

The Chicago Aurora and Elgin continued to use the terminal, though a problem loomed as plans for a new superhighway — the Congress Street Expressway — called for the road to be built on the route of Garfield Park 'L', necessitating the demolition of the elevated structure. Though the plans included a new rapid transit rail line in the median strip of the new highway, connecting with the Milwaukee-Dearborn subway, and though a temporary right-of-way was established to allow rail service to continue during construction, a number of operational and political obstacles led to the interurban deciding to change their service to the outer terminal of the elevated line at Des Plaines Avenue in Forest Park. Interurban riders therefore had to change trains to or from CTA trains at the Forest Park station to continue their rides after September 20, 1953.

This change brought an end to the use of Wells Street Terminal. The building was razed in 1955 and two of the terminal tracks connected to the Loop 'L' as a temporary connection, but with the completion of the expressway and new Congress rapid transit line on June 22, 1958, the Garfield Park 'L' came to an end and Congress trains were routed via the subway. The connecting tracks at the terminal's former location were removed in 1964.
