= Interstate 290 (Illinois) =

Highway in Illinois

Interstate 290
- I-290 highlighted in red

Route information
- Auxiliary route of I-90
- Maintained by IDOT
- Length: 29.84 mi (48.02 km)
- Existed: 1978–present
- History: Built from 1955 to 1972; Signed as I-90 before 1978
- NHS: Entire route

Major junctions
- West end: I-90 Toll / IL 53 in Rolling Meadows
- IL 53 in Elk Grove Village; IL 390 Toll in Elk Grove Village; I-355 in Itasca; US 20 / IL 64 in Elmhurst; I-294 Toll in Hillside; I-88 Toll / IL 110 (CKC) in Hillside; US 12 / US 20 / US 45 in Hillside
- East end: I-90 / I-94 / IL 110 (CKC) / Ida B. Wells Drive in Chicago

Location
- Country: United States
- State: Illinois
- Counties: Cook, DuPage

Highway system
- Interstate Highway System; Main; Auxiliary; Suffixed; Business; Future; Illinois State Highway System; Interstate; US; State; Tollways; Scenic
← I-280	→ I-294 Toll

Interstate 290 (I-290) is an auxiliary Interstate Highway that runs westward from the Jane Byrne Interchange near the Chicago Loop. The portion of I-290 from I-294 to its east end is officially called the Dwight D. Eisenhower Expressway. In short form, it is known as "the Ike" or the Eisenhower. Before being designated the Eisenhower Expressway, the highway was called the Congress Expressway because of the surface street that was located approximately in its path and onto which I-290 runs at its eastern terminus in the Loop.

I-290 connects I-90 (Jane Addams Memorial Tollway) in Rolling Meadows with I-90/I-94 (John F. Kennedy Expressway/Dan Ryan Expressway) near the Loop. North of I-355, the highway is sometimes known locally as Illinois Route 53 (IL 53), or simply Route 53, since IL 53 existed before I-290. However, it now merges with I-290 at Biesterfield Road. In total, I-290 is 29.84 miles (48.02 km) long.

== Route description ==
=== Jane Addams Memorial Tollway to Veterans Memorial Tollway ===
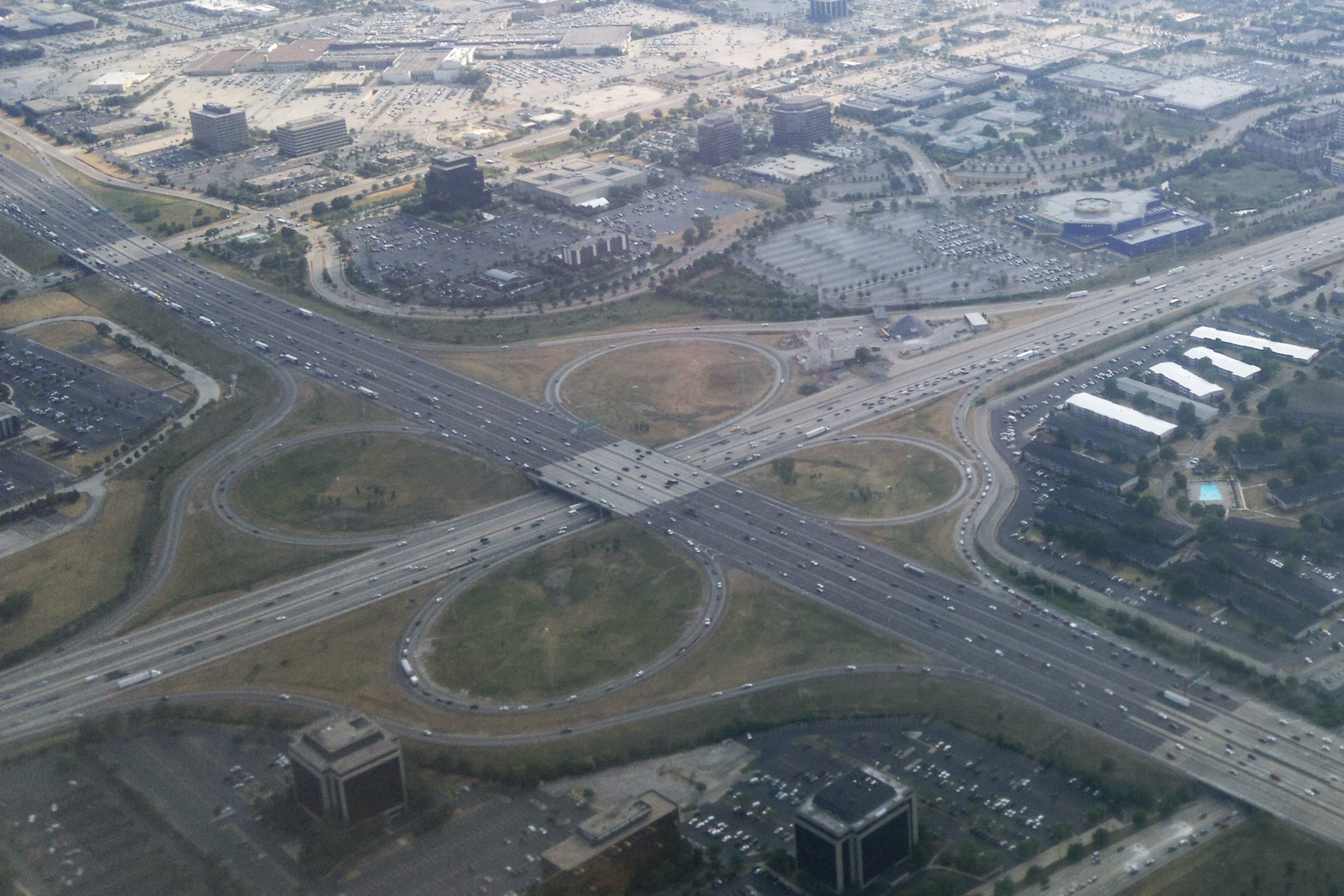
I-290 at its northern terminus, the interchange with IL 53 and I-90, in Schaumburg

I-290 eastbound at IL 390

This section is seven miles (11 km) long and runs from Rolling Meadows to Addison. It is the portion of I-290 more locally known as "Route 53". Here, I-290 runs largely above-grade through Schaumburg and Elk Grove Village and at- or below-grade through Itasca and Addison.

The northern five miles (8.0 km) of this highway were reconstructed in 2003–2004. A left shoulder and an auxiliary lane between ramps were added, as well as improved lighting. The highway is four lanes wide (not counting the auxiliary lane) north of IL 390 (milemarker 5) and five lanes wide with a wide left shoulder south to the exit to I-355.

Between milemarkers 0 and 4, IL 53 overlaps this section of the Eisenhower Expressway.

=== Eisenhower Extension ===
This section is 11 miles (18 km) long and runs from Addison to Hillside. It took its name when the Eisenhower was extended northwest from Hillside. The highway runs largely at-grade or above-grade for this length. US Route 20 (US 20) overlaps I-290 around Elmhurst from milemarkers 12 to 13 and runs parallel to the rest of this section between milemarkers 7 and 18.

This section of I-290 varies in width from two lanes at the ramp east from the I-290/I-355 split to three lanes between I-355 and US 20, to three lanes plus two exit lanes at US 20/IL 64 (Lake Street/North Avenue; exit 13B). After exit 13B, the highway reverts to three through traffic lanes. Exit 15 to southbound I-294 is a frequent point of congestion due to ramp traffic backing up onto the mainline highway, often as long as two miles (3.2 km). This is because the ramp is not isolated from the mainline, only one lane in width, is a low-speed ramp (marked as a 35-mile-per-hour [56 km/h] ramp), and is relatively short (1/4 mi or 0.40 km) while carrying a high volume of truck traffic south to Indiana from North Avenue. Additionally, the sudden appearance of the exit tends to cause accidents when cars in the center lane try to aggressively turn into the right lane, particularly at the mouth of the I-294 exit. Finally, there is a dangerous high-volume weaving situation at the end of the ramp to I-294 with southbound I-294 traffic exiting to westbound I-88.

In 2020, the Illinois State Toll Highway Authority began construction of an estimated $700–$800 million project intended to address these operational issues at the I-290/I-88 interchange at I-294 as part of the Illinois Tollway's Central Tri-State Project. Construction is intended to reduce backups and improve the chokepoint and include: barriers integrated to separate various ramp movements from merging traffic which is intended to alleviate heavy congestion due to traffic weaving from eastbound I-290 to southbound I-294; new ramp designs from northbound I- 294 to westbound I-290; a new fly under ramp to improve travel between westbound I-294 and westbound I-290; and adjustments to the exit travel pattern for drivers traveling between westbound I-290 and St. Charles Road. Work is scheduled to be complete by the end of 2026.

The western three miles (4.8 km) of this section are blacktop, while east of IL 83 (exit 10) the original concrete is still in place.

=== Tri-State Tollway to Austin Boulevard ===
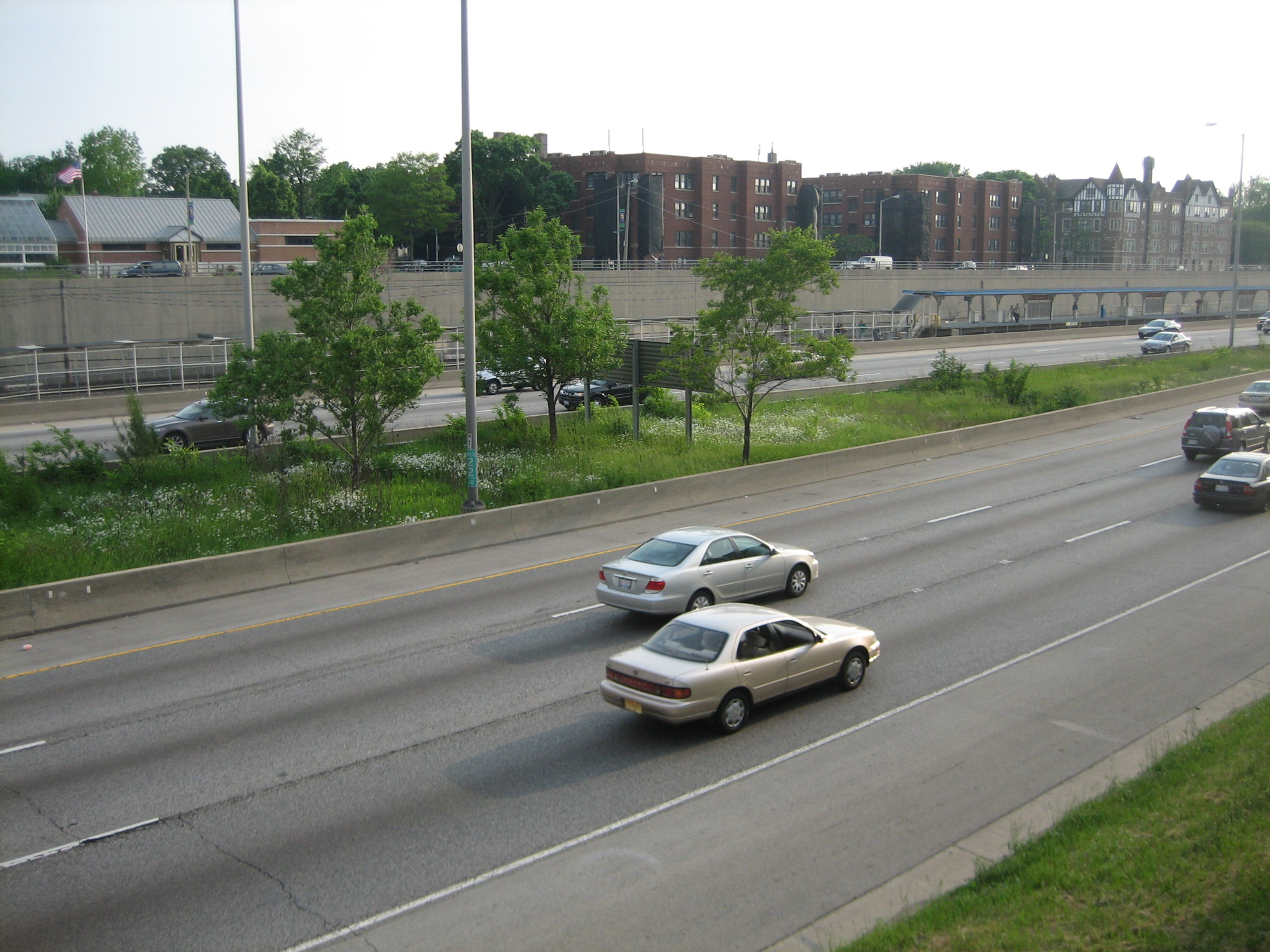
I-290 in Oak Park

This section of I-290 is seven miles (11 km) long, and it runs from Hillside to the western border of Chicago. This section is sometimes referred to as the "Avenues". As of 2002, it is the third-most-congested stretch of highway in the Chicago metropolitan area, behind the Jane Byrne Interchange area and the intersection of the Dan Ryan Expressway and Chicago Skyway. It is known for having a high volume of traffic on ramps through the Avenues, and high volumes of traffic on left-side ramps in Forest Park and Oak Park. I-290 runs above-grade west of Mannheim Road and at- or below-grade east of Mannheim Road.

Eastbound at Mannheim Road (exit 17), the highway splits into two express and one local lane; they are joined by two onramps from I-88 and form express lanes three lanes wide and local lanes to Mannheim Road two lanes wide. After Mannheim Road, the highway immediately narrows to three lanes in width, causing mile-long (1.6 km) backups. It remains three lanes to Austin Boulevard. Westbound, I-290 merely is three lanes wide to Mannheim Road and then four lanes wide to the I-88/I-290 split. Exits at Harlem Avenue (exit 21B) and Austin Boulevard (exit 23) are inverted single-point urban interchanges (inverted SPUIs), with left offramps and onramps. These cause backups as trucks switch lanes to exit and a large volume of traffic enters on the left side of the highway.

In 2001–2002, this section between milemarkers 15 and 18 was reconstructed in the first phase of an attempt to untangle the "Hillside Strangler", adding the local lanes and extra onramp to I-290. The second phase, reconstruction of the highway between milemarkers 18 and 23 (Mannheim Road to Austin Boulevard), is still in the preliminary engineering phase of construction as of April 2009.

=== Austin Boulevard to Chicago Loop ===
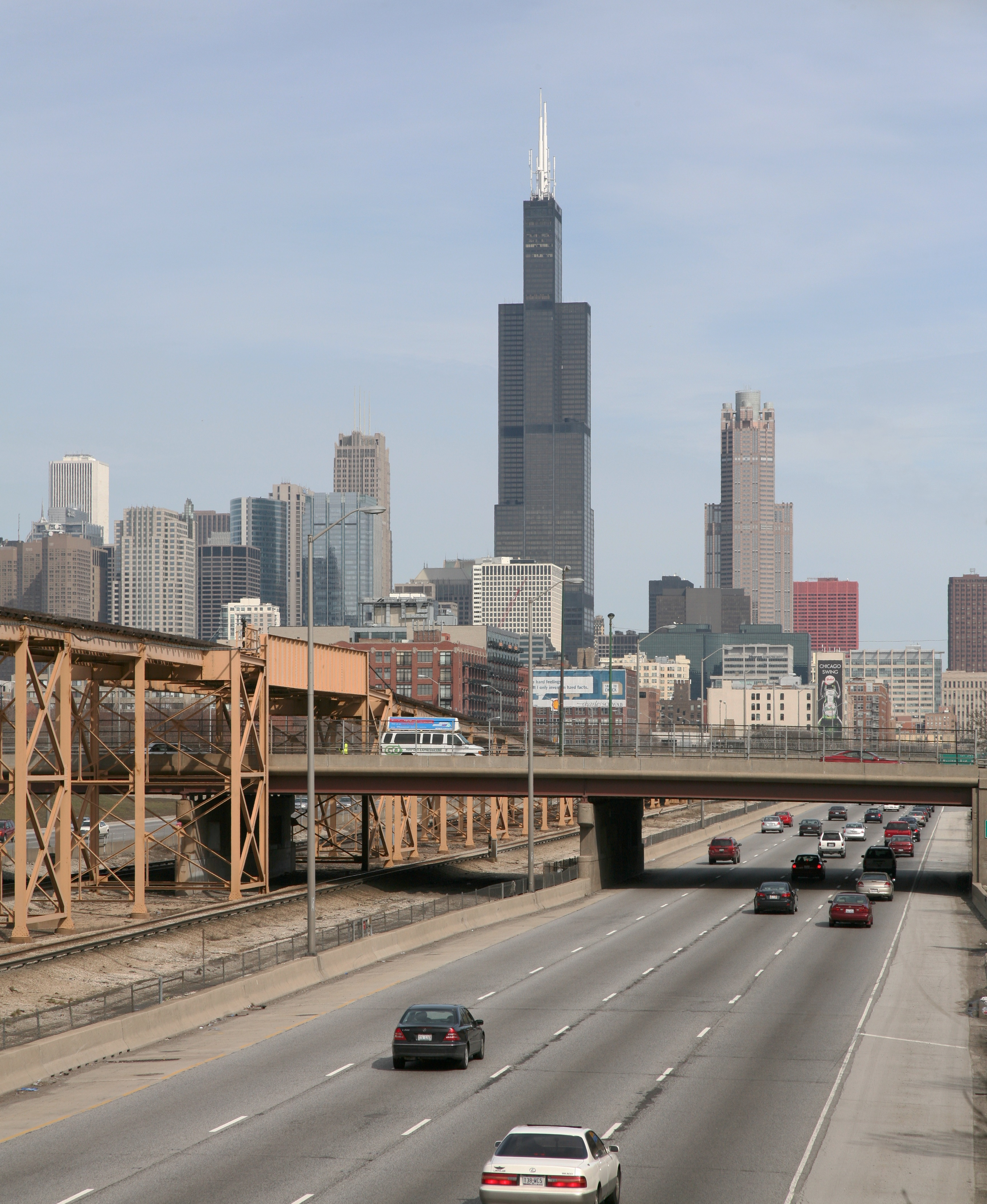
I-290 at milemarker 28, looking east toward downtown Chicago

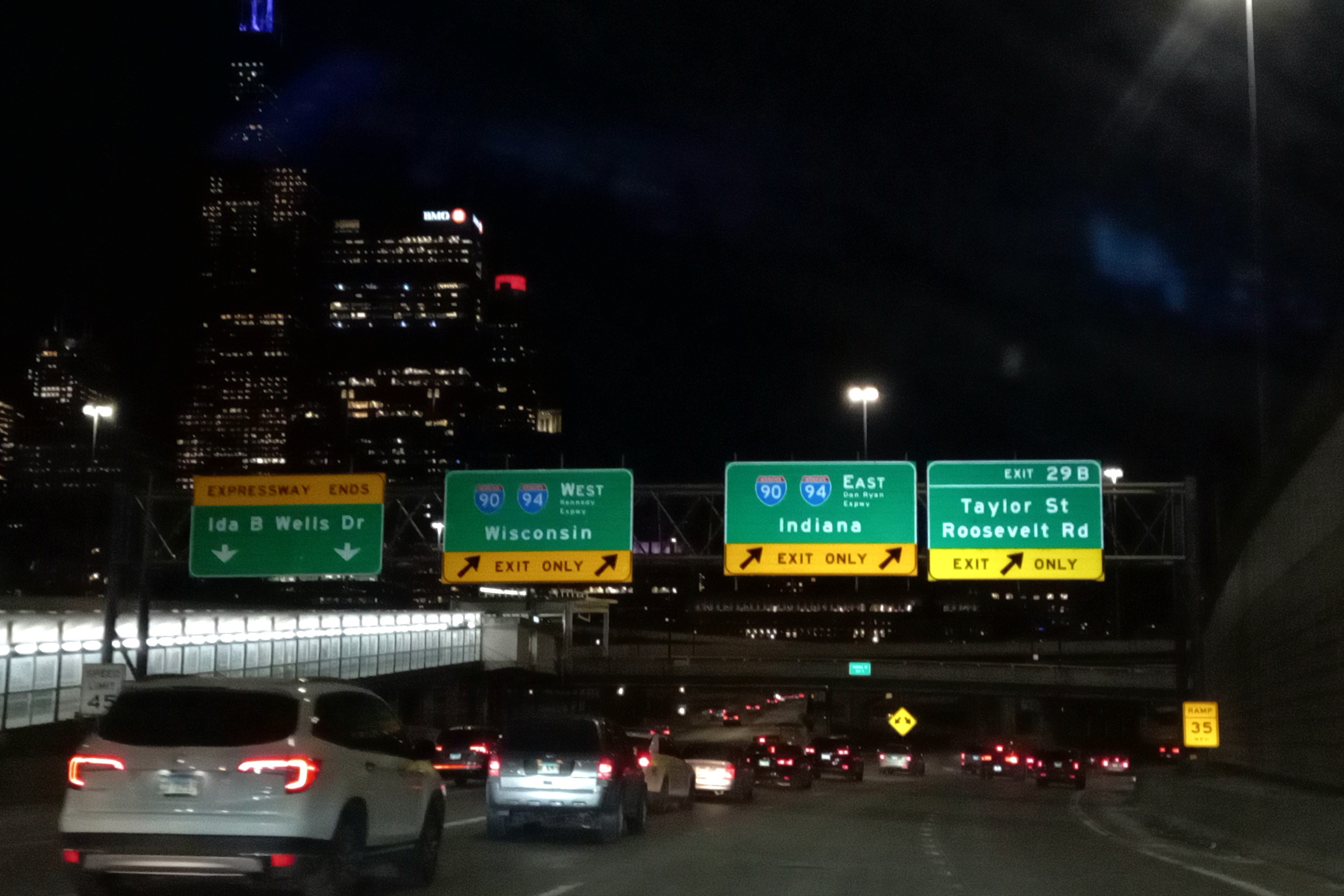
I-290 approaching the Jane Byrne Interchange at Halsted Street

The easternmost section of I-290 is seven miles (11 km) long and runs entirely through the city of Chicago to the terminus at I-90/I-94. It runs below grade for its entire length.

This highway is four lanes wide in both directions for its entire length, and most onramps and offramps are located just two blocks apart. Therefore, an exit in one direction may be marked one street (e.g., Laramie Avenue), while the same exit in the other direction may be marked another (e.g., Cicero Avenue), even though the streets are only a block apart. This configuration results in most exits on this portion of the road being marked as A/B exits.

Eastbound congestion is lighter here than through the "Avenues", generally limited to congestion on the tight onramps to the Kennedy and Dan Ryan expressways (Jane Byrne Interchange) at the eastern terminus or blind onramps at Kostner and Homan avenues. Westbound, congestion is heavy starting at Laramie due to the left-hand exit at Austin (which combines a "perfect storm" of a four-down-to-three lane reduction, an unfamiliar left-hand exit, and entrance and in-merging traffic of the central onramp). Most afternoons, this bottleneck can skyrocket the "Post Office to Wolf (Road)" commute time to over an hour (up from 16 minutes with no traffic).

The Eisenhower Expressway runs along blacktop pavement for the length of the section, except between Kostner Avenue and Independence Boulevard, where it runs on concrete pavement.

The eastern terminus of I-290 is the Jane Byrne Interchange with I-90/I-94. After this junction, the route becomes elevated and continues as a highway until Wells Street (Chicago), at which point it passes under the Old Chicago Main Post Office and becomes a city street (Ida B. Wells Drive). The Ida B. Wells Drive route continues east until the street is stopped by Buckingham Fountain.

The Blue Line operates in the median of the Eisenhower from Halsted Street to Cicero Avenue. After Cicero, the line leaves the median and runs on the south side of the Eisenhower for the remainder of its route to Des Plaines Avenue, Forest Park.

== History ==
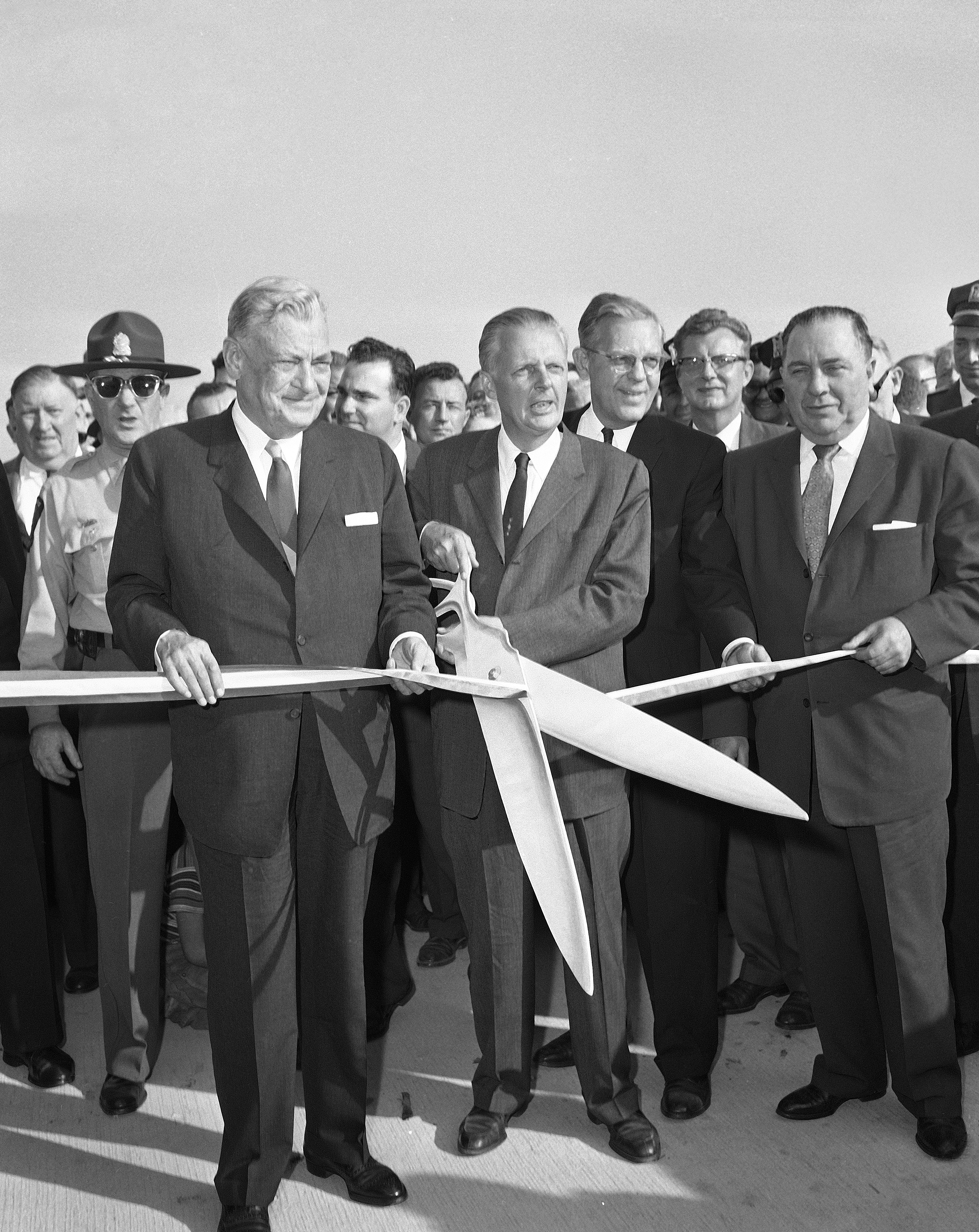
Ribbon-cutting opening Congress Expressway, October 12, 1960

Rapid transit had existed in the vicinity of the future expressway's right of way since 1895, when the Metropolitan West Side Elevated Railroad opened its main line east of Marshfield Avenue on May 6 and its Garfield Park branch west to 48th Avenue (modern-day Cicero Avenue) on June 19. The Metropolitan's lines, alongside the rest of Chicago's rapid transit network, were assumed by the Chicago Rapid Transit Company (CRT) in 1924.

An expressway along the alignment of the Eisenhower Expressway was foreshadowed by Daniel Burnham's plan of 1909, which described a west side boulevard. Use of the automobile boomed in the 1920s, leading to extreme traffic on Chicago's west side and the first serious plans of an expressway by Congress Street in the early 1930s. The passageway under the Old Post Office was designed to preserve the right of way for this future road.

The Congress Expressway opened October 12, 1960. On January 10, 1964, it was renamed for former President Dwight D. Eisenhower after Mayor Richard J. Daley offered a resolution to the Chicago City Council. The resolution was unanimously approved by the Chicago City Council. Eisenhower was pleased with the honor, and issued a statement which said, "I am highly complimented by the action of the city council and the mayor and express my appreciation for anyone connected with this thought.

The highway is a tribute to the 34th President of the United States who signed the Federal-Aid Highway Act of 1956 and authorized the Interstate Highway System. The highway was originally called the Congress Expressway because it partially follows the route of Congress Parkway (portions now called Ida B. Wells Drive) in Chicago. The first segment, 2.5 miles (4.0 km) in length, opened from Mannheim Road to 1st Avenue in December 1955. On December 15, an additional four miles (6.4 km) was opened, from Ashland Avenue (1600 West) to Laramie Avenue (5200 West).

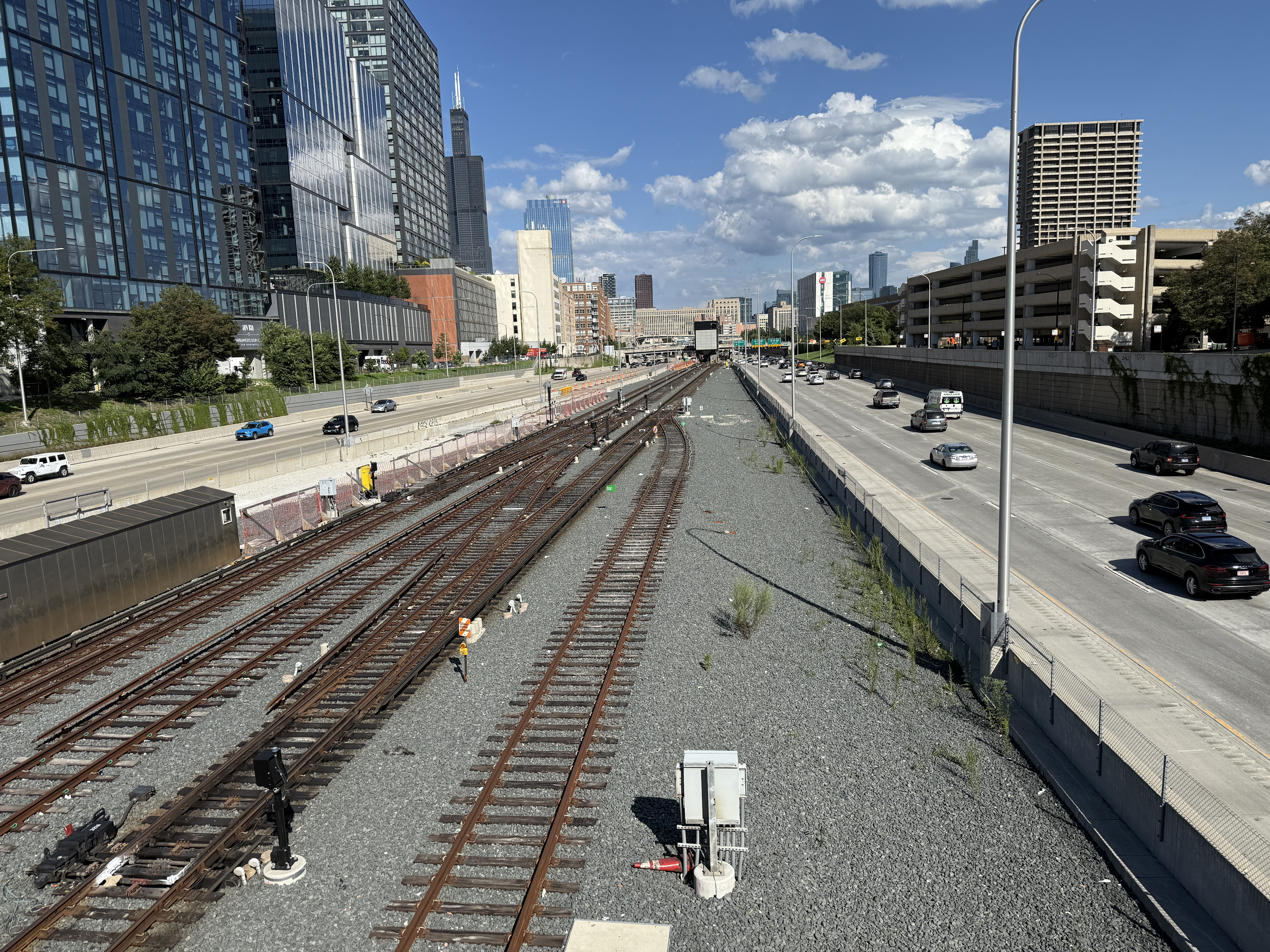
I-290 eastbound on the Eisenhower Expressway in Chicago

During the 1960s and 1970s, the Eisenhower Expressway was extended to Lake Street and North Avenue in Elmhurst. In 1963, the first working example of ramp metering took place on the Eisenhower Expressway, based on successful metering through New York City tunnels and data from ramp closures in Detroit, Michigan. The first implementation utilized a police officer at the top of an entrance ramp, stopping and releasing vehicles onto the highway at a predetermined rate. Another section opened in 1972, to a north–south expressway in Addison, Illinois. At the time, this expressway was a short spur from the Eisenhower Expressway, and it was referred to as IL 53, which continued north to Schaumburg. Construction on IL 53 had finished in 1970.

Until 1977, the Eisenhower Expressway was marked as a part of I-90. In 1978, I-90 was rerouted over the Kennedy Expressway and the Northwest Tollway, replacing IL 194. The Eisenhower Expressway was then renumbered as I-290 and signage was updated in 1979.

Because the segment from I-294 to IL 53 was built last, that portion of the highway is referred to as the Eisenhower Extension. The Eisenhower Expressway, extension included, is 23 miles (37 km) long. If the IL 53 portion of I-290 is added to that, the highway is 30 miles (48 km) long.

In 2003–2004, the first five miles (8.0 km) of I-290 out of Schaumburg were rebuilt, replacing pavement that had well-exceeded its estimated 20-year lifetime. (The original pavement was built in stages from 1963 through 1970 as part of IL 53.) A fifth auxiliary lane was added between the entrance and exit ramps of exits 1, 4, and 5. The most important safety upgrade was the demolition of the raised grassy median between the westbound and eastbound lanes, and its replacement with a permanent concrete median and wide shoulders.

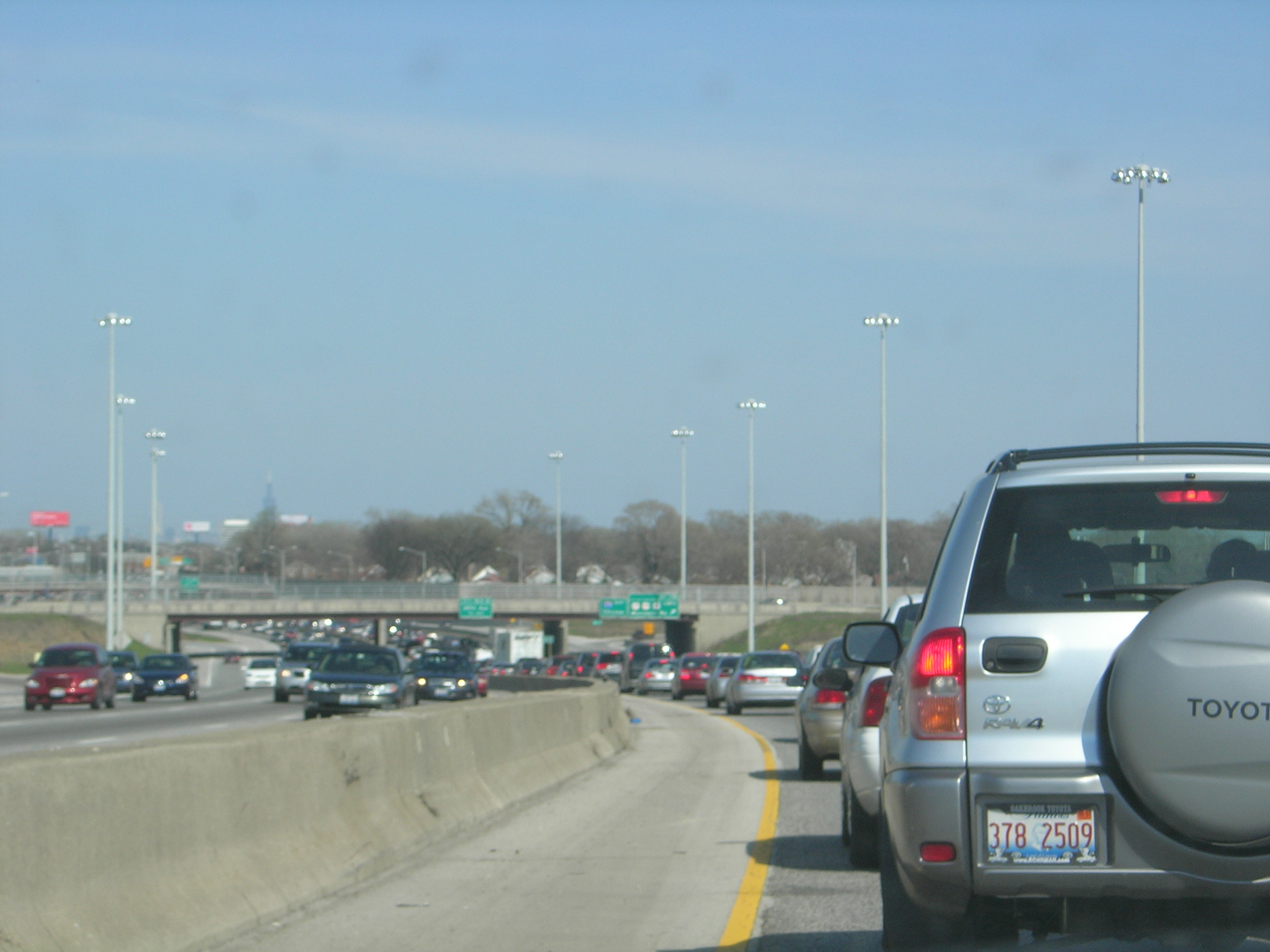
Inbound I-290 at the Hillside Strangler

Diagram of the Hillside Strangler

- Hillside Strangler: Named after the Chicago suburb of Hillside, it refers to a major merge with I-88, and almost always is used when referring to inbound (eastbound) traffic. It is at this point that I-88 terminates eastbound. It was called the Strangler because, before its reconstruction in the early 2000s, seven throughlanes were forced to merge to three, creating large backups. Reconstruction widened part of this area to nine lanes (five inbound; three through; two local; and four through outbound). This allowed direct exits to Mannheim Road (US 12/US 20/US 45) from I-88, the ramp also serving for an I-88 truck access to eastbound I-290; created an inbound collector–distributor ramp for Mannheim Road; and added a timed gate that closed a ramp from Roosevelt Road (IL 38) to inbound I-290 during the afternoon rush hours. These improvements helped congestion at the site, but they also pushed preexisting congestion further east to the six-lane portion of the highway. The Hillside Strangler is located at about milemarker 18.
- The Avenues: The portion of the highway between Mannheim Road at milemarker 17 and First Avenue in Maywood, a stretch of three miles (4.8 km). Named because all of the crossroads between these two exits are named numerically, in ascending order traveling outbound (westbound). 1st Avenue (IL 171) is exit 20. There are exits to 9th, 17th, and 25th Avenues to the west. These exits are spaced 0.50 miles (0.80 km) apart. This stretch is notorious for being very congested.
- Eisenhower Extension or 290 Extension: The eight miles (13 km) of road between current-day milemarker 7 (I-355 south to US 20/Lake Street) and North Avenue (IL 64), milemarker 15. This section was built in the late 1970s.
- Jane Byrne Interchange: The eastern terminus of I-290 where it meets I-90/I-94, which overlap through Chicago. North of this interchange I-90/I- 94 is called the Kennedy Expressway, while south of it I-90/I-94 is called the Dan Ryan Expressway. The interchange itself consists of eight heavily used, very tight ramps that wind around each other, giving the interchange a distinct circle shape when looked at from above. This design, adequate when first built in the 1950s, forces drivers to slow down to speeds of about 20 mph (32 km/h) due to its tightly wound curves. Not only did this lead to the worst congestion in the Chicago area, a 2010 study of freight congestion (truck speed and travel time) by the Federal Highway Administration ranked this section of the I-290 as having the worst congestion in the US; the average truck speed just 29 mph (47 km/h). The interchange was completely rebuilt and reconfigured from 2013 to 2022.

=== Old Post Office ===
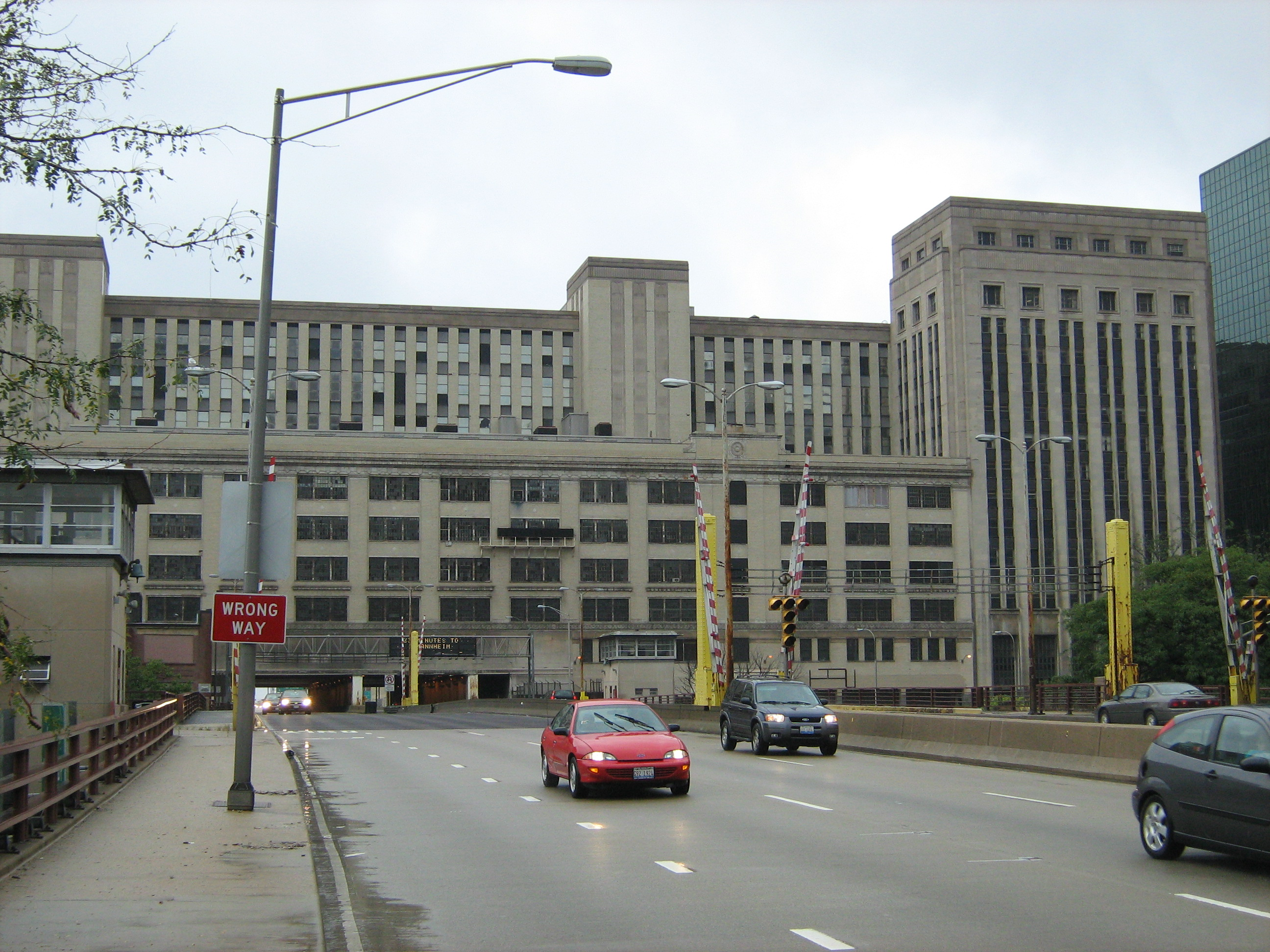
Drivers coming out from under the Old Post Office

Just east of the I-290–I-90/I-94 junction in downtown Chicago, the Old Chicago Main Post Office is a building that stretches over Ida B. Wells Drive. If one drives eastbound on I-290 and continues past I-90/I-94, the highway ends and becomes Ida B. Wells Drive. The Old Post Office was a landmark that was sometimes used in referring to the end of I-290 in downtown Chicago. For example, a traffic reporter might say "forty minutes from Mannheim to the Old Post Office".

This large building was used by the US Postal Service (USPS) until 1996. The building itself was built from 1921 to 1933 in the Art-Deco style, and it is 2.5 million square feet (230,000 m^{2}) in size. The building, built several decades before the expressway that passes through it, was originally designed to accommodate a roadway—requiring only minimal work to remove walls in the base for the freeway to pass through. In spite of its unused state, the building is still known to visitors and commuters alike as the unofficial gateway into the Loop area. In late August 2009, the USPS announced an auction was to be held to sell the facility to the highest bidder. The winning bid ($40 million [equivalent to $58.3 million in 2025]) was from an English real-estate developer, Bill Davies.

=== Impact ===
Within Chicago alone, the Eisenhower Expressway displaced 13,000 people and destroyed 400 businesses, leading to a decline on Chicago's West Side. In Oak Park, about 100 buildings were demolished. Further along in Forest Park, approximately 3,500 graves had to be moved from cemeteries to make way for the expressway. The Eisenhower was the first expressway in the heart of Chicago, yet for its $183 million cost, the thousands of people displaced, and the neighborhoods torn up, traffic congestion did not improve.

Residents at the time described the demolition of neighborhoods as looking like the aftermath of a World War II bombing. The historian Beryl Satter stated about the expressway,

It sliced the neighborhood in two and essentially destroyed it. Routines that had marked daily life were now impossible. The walk to the newsstand for the Sunday morning paper? Forget it; what used to be a peaceful stroll now entailed crossing eight lanes of traffic. The corner tailor? Gone. The baker? Out of business.

Not only did the aftermath of construction lead to the decline of west side neighborhoods, but the construction process itself brought crime to the area. A local newspaper, the Garfieldian, wrote in 1951,

Organized hoodlums, vandals, morons and just ordinary scavengers loot the vacant buildings that are to be wrecked to make way for the Congress St. highway in broad daylight as well as at night time. The abundance of prowlers and other undesirable characters in the neighborhood has made residents, especially women, afraid to go out at night. Many of the buildings are used as 'lover's nests', residents reported.

== Exit list ==
County	Location	mi	km	Exit	Destinations	Notes
Cook	Rolling Meadows	0.00	0.00		IL 53 north	Western end of IL 53 concurrency; continuation beyond I-90
Cook	Rolling Meadows	0.00	0.00	—	I-90 Toll (Jane Addams Memorial Tollway) – Rockford, Chicago	Western terminus of I-290; I-90 exit 68A
Cook	Schaumburg	0.60	0.97	1A	Woodfield Road to IL 58 (Golf Road)	Signed as exit 1 westbound
Cook	Schaumburg	1.44	2.32	1B	IL 72 (Higgins Road)	Signed as exit 1 westbound
Cook	Elk Grove Village	3.93	6.32	4	IL 53 south (Biesterfield Road)	Eastern end of IL 53 concurrency
DuPage	Itasca	5.03	8.10	5	IL 390 Toll (Elgin–O'Hare Tollway); Hamilton Lakes Drive / Park Boulevard	I-Pass required; IL 390 exits 12B-C
DuPage	Itasca	6.46	10.40	7	I-355 south to US 20 (Lake Street) – Joliet	Northern terminus of I-355
DuPage	Addison	10.69	17.20	10	IL 83 (Kingery Highway)	Signed as exits 10A (south) and 10B (north)
DuPage	Elmhurst	12.34	19.86	12	US 20 west / IL 64 Truck west (Lake Street); York Street	Western end of US 20/IL 64 Truck concurrency
DuPage	Elmhurst	13.41	21.58	13A	IL 64 east (North Avenue) / US 20 east (Lake Street) / IL 64 Truck end I-294 Toll north (Tri-State Tollway) – Milwaukee	Eastern end of US 20 concurrency; eastern end of IL 64 Truck concurency; I-294 exit 33
DuPage	Elmhurst	13.41	21.58	13B	IL 64 west (North Avenue)	Westbound exit and eastbound entrance only; trucks prohibited
DuPage–Cook county line	Elmhurst–Berkeley line	14.76	23.75	14	St. Charles Road	Signed as exits 14A (west) and 14B (east); trucks prohibited on St. Charles Road west
Cook	Berkeley	15.50	24.94	15A	I-294 Toll south (Tri-State Tollway) to I-88 Toll west / IL 110 (CKC) west (Ronald Reagan Memorial Tollway) – Indiana, Aurora	Eastbound exit and westbound entrance; I-294 north exit 31
Cook	Berkeley	15.50	24.94	15B	I-294 Toll north (Tri-State Tollway) – Milwaukee, O'Hare	Westbound exit and eastbound entrance; I-294 south exit 31B
Cook	Hillside	15.97	25.70	15A	I-88 Toll west / IL 110 (CKC) west (Ronald Reagan Memorial Tollway) – Aurora I-294 Toll south (Tri-State Tollway) to IL 38 west (Roosevelt Road) – Indiana	Western end of IL 110 concurrency; westbound exit and eastbound entrance only; eastern terminus of I-88; western end of Eisenhower Expressway
Cook	Hillside	16.44	26.46	16	Wolf Road	Westbound exit and eastbound entrance only
Cook	Hillside	17.52	28.20	17	US 12 / US 20 / US 45 (Mannheim Road)	Signed as exits 17A (east/south) and 17B (west/north) eastbound
Cook	Bellwood	18.54	29.84	18	25th Avenue	Signed as exits 18A (south) and 18B (north)
Cook	Maywood	19.05	30.66	19A	17th Avenue	
Cook	Maywood	19.56	31.48	19B	9th Avenue	Westbound exit and eastbound entrance only
Cook	Maywood	20.06	32.28	20	IL 171 (1st Avenue)	
Cook	Forest Park	21.02	33.83	21A	Des Plaines Avenue	Westbound entrance and eastbound exit only
Cook	Oak Park	21.58	34.73	21B	IL 43 (Harlem Avenue)	Inverted single-point urban interchange
Cook	Oak Park	23.09	37.16	23A	Austin Boulevard	Inverted single-point urban interchange
Cook	Chicago	23.63	38.03	23B	Central Avenue	
Cook	Chicago	24.09	38.77	24A	Laramie Avenue	Westbound exit and eastbound entrance only
Cook	Chicago	24.61	39.61	24B	IL 50 (Cicero Avenue) – Midway Airport	Eastbound exit and westbound entrance only
Cook	Chicago	25.14	40.46	25	Kostner Avenue	Westbound exit and eastbound entrance only
Cook	Chicago	25.70	41.36	26A	Independence Boulevard	
Cook	Chicago	26.41	42.50	26B	Homan Avenue	Westbound exit and eastbound entrance only
Cook	Chicago	26.90	43.29	27A	Sacramento Avenue	Eastbound exit and westbound entrance only
Cook	Chicago	27.15	43.69	27B	California Avenue	Westbound exit and eastbound entrance only
Cook	Chicago	27.67	44.53	27C	Western Avenue, Oakley Boulevard	
Cook	Chicago	28.17	45.34	28A	Damen Avenue	To United Center
Cook	Chicago	28.54	45.93	28B	Paulina Street, Ashland Avenue	
Cook	Chicago	29.43	47.36	29A	Racine Avenue	Eastbound exit and westbound entrance only
Cook	Chicago	29.53	47.52	29B	Morgan Street	Westbound exit only; only accessible from the I-90 west/I-94 west ramp
Cook	Chicago	29.7	47.8	29B	Taylor Street / Roosevelt Road	Eastbound exit only
Cook	Chicago	29.84	48.02	—	I-90 east / I-94 east (Dan Ryan Expressway) – Indiana I-90 west / I-94 west (Kennedy Expressway) – Wisconsin IL 110 (CKC) ends	Eastern end of IL 110 concurrency; Jane Byrne Interchange; eastern terminus of I-290/IL 110; eastern end of Eisenhower Expressway; I-94 exit 51H
Cook	Chicago	29.84	48.02		Ida B. Wells Drive – Chicago Loop	Continuation beyond I-90/I-94; formerly Congress Parkway
1.000 mi = 1.609 km; 1.000 km = 0.621 mi: Concurrency terminus; Electronic toll collection; Incomplete access
