= O'Hare station train crash =

2014 railway incident at Chicago O'Hare Airport

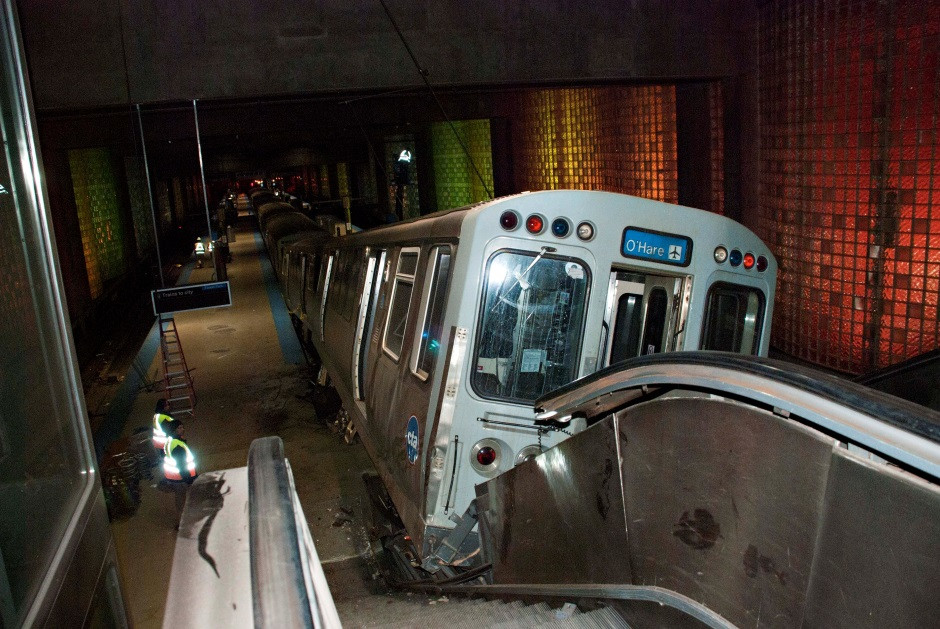
- The crashed train atop the escalator

Details
- Date: March 24, 2014; 12 years ago 2:49 a.m. CDT
- Location: O'Hare station, at Chicago O'Hare International Airport
- Coordinates: 41°58′52″N 87°54′03″W
- Country: United States
- Line: CTA Blue Line
- Operator: Chicago Transit Authority
- Incident type: Overran bumper
- Cause: Operator falling asleep at controls

Statistics
- Trains: 1
- Injured: 34
- Damage: $11,196,796

On March 24, 2014, a Chicago "L" train crashed at O'Hare station, injuring 34 people. A Blue Line train entering the station, the line's terminus, crashed into a bumper block and ran up an escalator after the operator fell asleep at the controls. The crash caused over $11 million in damage and halted service to O'Hare station for 6 days.

The National Transportation Safety Board's investigation of the crash found that the train operator was affected by sleep debt from insufficient sleep over the course of multiple days. In its final report on the crash, the NTSB criticized the Chicago Transit Authority's scheduling policies, which it found contributed to train operators becoming fatigued. Additionally, the NTSB found that the train stop system at O'Hare station was incorrectly configured. The CTA responded by revising its scheduling policies and reconfiguring train stops at terminal stations throughout the "L" system.

== Background ==
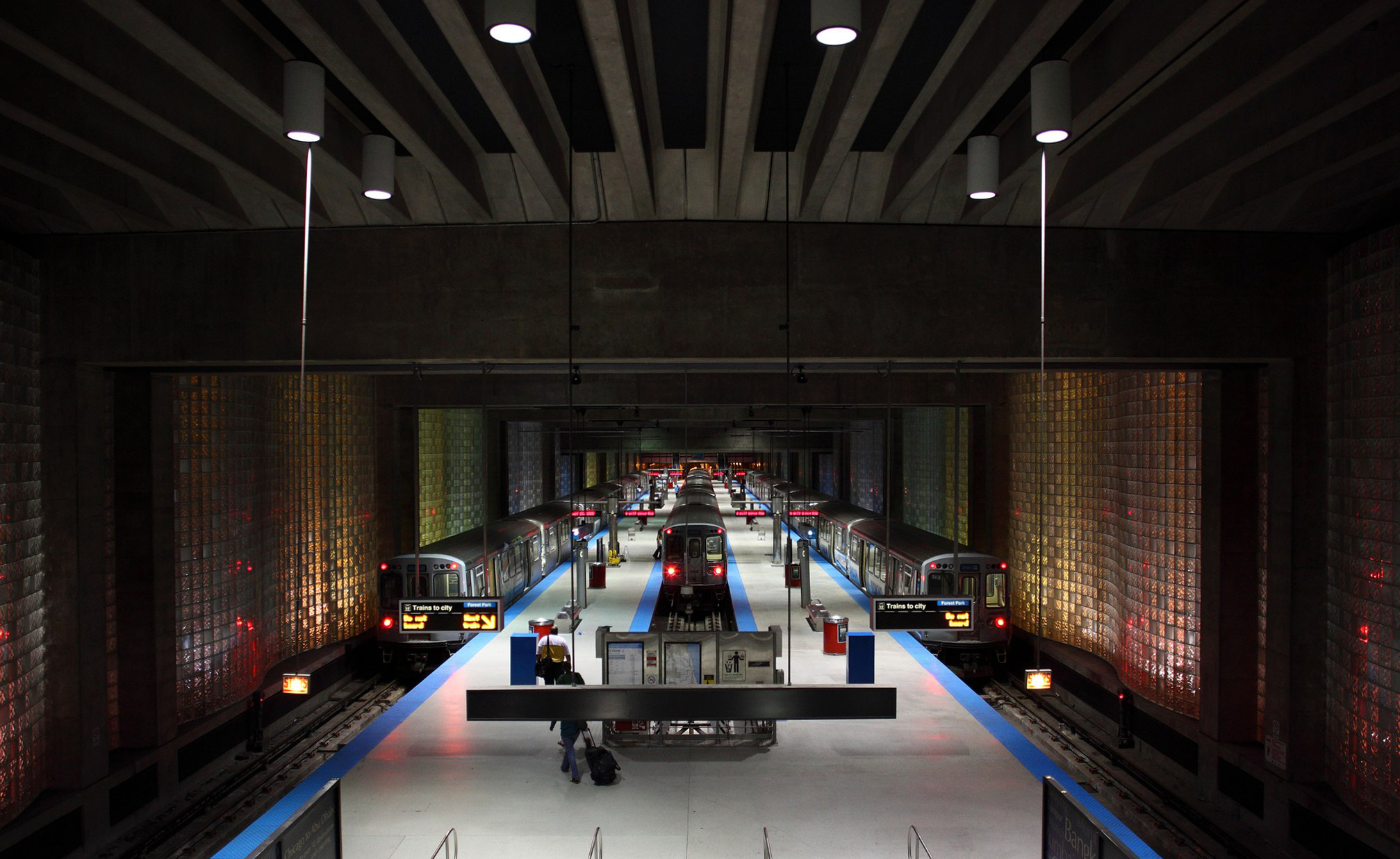
View of O'Hare station from the escalator that the train impacted, showing the three-track layout

The crash occurred at O'Hare station, the northwestern terminus of the Blue Line of the Chicago "L". The underground station has three tracks with a bay platform that extends into two island platforms. Passengers enter the station at the end of the platforms via a set of escalators and elevators, located in line with the center track.

The train involved in the crash was Blue Line train number 141, which was operated by an eight-car train of 2600-series cars. Blue Line service normally operates 24/7 between O'Hare and Forest Park, but scheduled maintenance on the night of March 23-24 resulted in trains operating a shorter route from O'Hare to Logan Square.

== Crash ==
Train 141 departed Logan Square at 2:23 a.m, and the operator reported that she began to feel drowsy near Harlem station. The operator continued along the route towards O'Hare after adjusting a heater in the train cab in an attempt to stay awake. About 50 people were onboard the train, which was scheduled to terminate at O'Hare on the center track.

As Train 141 was entering O'Hare station, the operator fell asleep. The train entered O'Hare station at a normal speed of approximately 25 miles per hour (40 km/h), and was routed onto the center track. The train operator woke up when the train hit a train stop approximately 45 ft (14 m) from the end of the track, and immediately applied the brakes.

At 2:49 a.m. local time (07:50 UTC), the train crashed into the bumper block at the end of the center track. The train slowed slightly to approximately 23 miles per hour (37 km/h) by the time it hit the bumper block, which failed to stop the train as designed. The train then overran the bumper block and rode up onto an escalator in front of the center track, coming to rest with the front car partially up the escalator. The force of the collision separated the body of the leading car from its front truck, which remained on the track.

While a spokesman initially stated that it was likely that the train entered the station at too high a speed, later estimates indicated that the train entered the station at 25 to 26 miles per hour (40 to 42 km/h), which was not an excessive speed.

== Response ==
At least 50 firefighters and paramedics responded to the accident. Thirty-four people were injured, including the train operator. They were taken to the Advocate Lutheran General Hospital, the Our Lady of the Resurrection Medical Center, the Resurrection Hospital and the Swedish Covenant Hospital.

Following the accident, the line between O'Hare and Rosemont was closed, with a replacement bus service in place. The CTA initially estimated that the station would be closed for 48 hours, and later revised its estimate to one week.

The front two cars of the train were damaged in the accident, with the cost of the damage initially estimated at $6 million. On March 26, work began to scrap the lead car on site. The derailed train was removed from the station on March 27, and the station reopened on March 30, 6 days after the crash. The escalator damaged in the crash was replaced by stairs. The final estimate of the cost of the damage was $11.2 million, equivalent to $14.6 million in 2024.

== Investigation ==
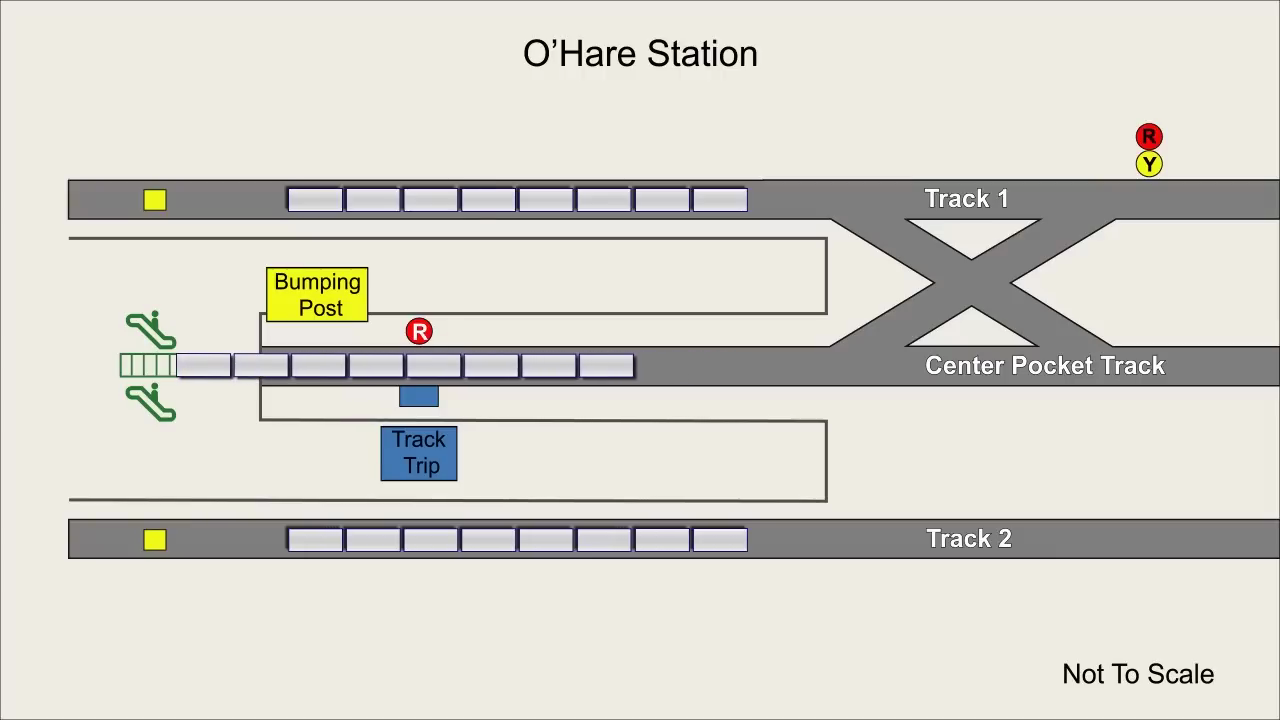
Diagram of the collision

The National Transportation Safety Board (NTSB) opened an investigation into the accident. Investigators focused on the theory that the operator, 25-year-old Brittney Tysheka Haywood, fell asleep at the controls. She stated that she had recently performed "a lot of overtime". When interviewed by the NTSB, Haywood admitted falling asleep at the controls and disclosed that she had done a similar thing the previous month, which resulted in an overshoot at Belmont (Blue) on February 1. Haywood did not reveal to CTA that she had fallen asleep when questioned about the overshoot.

The investigation was hampered by the train's lack of a train event recorder, although it was fitted with a video camera. The recording from the camera was examined. Images from 41 cameras within the station were also studied. The NTSB's report ultimately confirmed the original findings.

In its final report, the NTSB concluded:

The National Transportation Safety Board determines that the probable cause of the accident was the failure of the train operator to stop the train at the appropriate signal due to falling asleep as a result of fatigue, which was the result of the challenges of working shiftwork, circadian factors, and acute sleep loss resulting from her ineffective off-duty time management. In addition, Chicago Transit Authority failed to effectively manage the operator’s work schedule to mitigate the risk of fatigue. Contributing to the severity of the accident was Chicago Transit Authority’s failure to identify the insufficient stopping distance and inadequate speed restriction at the center pocket track at O’Hare Station.

== Aftermath ==
As a direct consequence of the accident, the CTA reduced the speed limit into the O'Hare station from 25 miles per hour (40 km/h) to 15 miles per hour (24 km/h). The area of the speed limit was extended away from the station. Similar modifications were made at other "L" terminal stations, including Midway, Linden, and Cottage Grove. The CTA fired the train operator in April 2014.

== See also ==
- 2023 Chicago train crash, a similar incident on the Yellow Line where a train collided with maintenance equipment.
- Rotterdam metro crash, a similar accident on the Rotterdam Metro where a sliding train crashed through the buffers and came to a stop on top of a whale sculpture.
- 1950 Chicago streetcar crash
- 1977 Chicago Loop derailment
