= Clinton station (CTA Blue Line) =

Chicago "L" station

Clinton 540W 500S
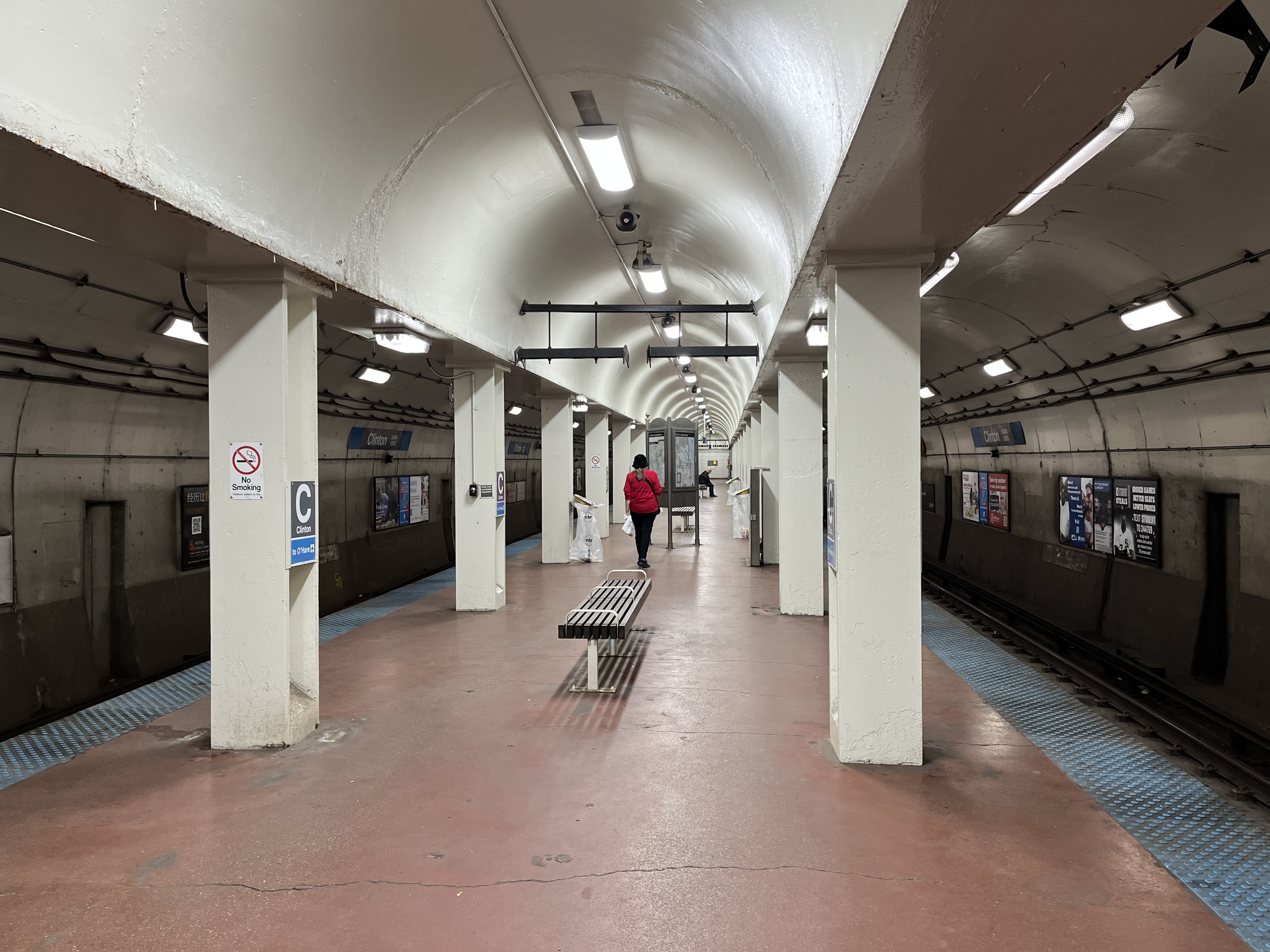

General information
- Location: 426 South Clinton Street; Chicago, Illinois 60607
- Coordinates: 41.875539°N 87.640984°W
- Owner: City of Chicago
- Line: Milwaukee–Dearborn subway
- Platforms: 1 island platform
- Tracks: 2
- Connections: and at Union Station; CTA and Greyhound Buses

Construction
- Structure type: Subway
- Depth: 66 ft (20 m)
- Accessible: No

History
- Opened: June 22, 1958; 68 years ago

Passengers
- 2025: 659,565 ▲16.1%

Services
Preceding station	Chicago "L"	Following station
UIC–Halsted toward Forest Park	Blue Line	LaSalle toward O'Hare
Track layout
Location

Clinton is a subway station on the Chicago Transit Authority's 'L' system, serving the Blue Line and the West Loop neighborhood of the larger Near West Side community area. The Congress Branch of the Blue Line opened in June 1958, and connected to the existing Dearborn subway at LaSalle. It is the closest 'L' station to Union Station, which doubles as Chicago's Amtrak station and the downtown terminal for several Metra lines. It is also the closest station to Chicago's Greyhound bus terminal. Union Station is two blocks north, while Greyhound is one block west.

It is the deepest station on the CTA system.

== History ==
=== Underground station ===
The current underground station opened on June 22, 1958, as a western extension of the Milwaukee–Dearborn subway, continuing west toward the Congress branch. Before then, the subway ended at LaSalle station east across the South Branch Chicago River.

== Bus connections ==
CTA

- 7 Harrison (weekdays only)
- 37 Sedgwick (weekdays only)
- 60 Blue Island/26th (Owl Service)
- 157 Streeterville/Taylor (weekdays only)
- 192 University of Chicago Hospitals Express (weekday rush hours only)

Greyhound

- Two blocks southwest

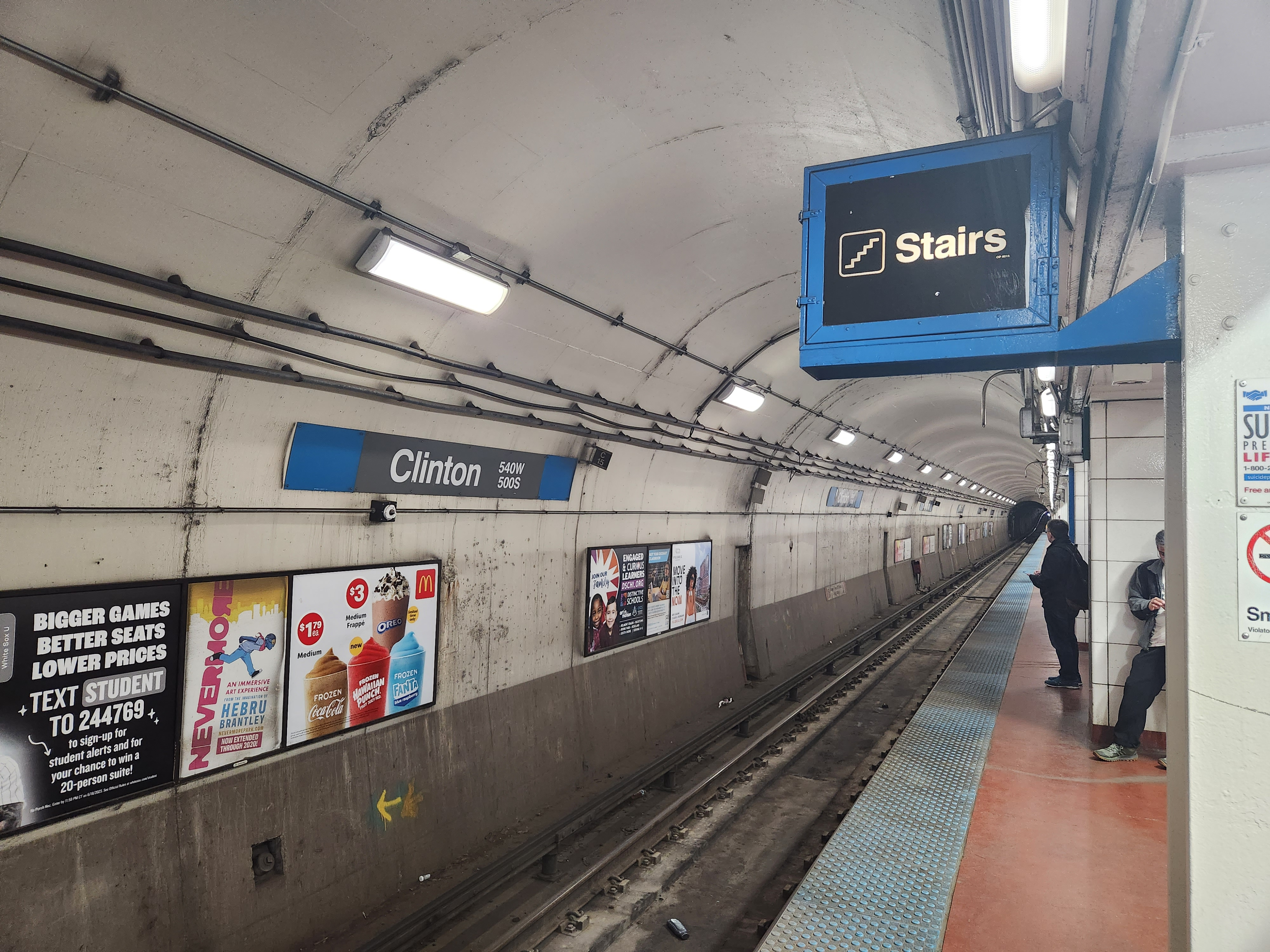
Interior of the station
