= Logan Square station (CTA Logan Square branch) =

Chicago rapid transit station, 1895–1970

LOGAN SQUARE 3200W 2600N
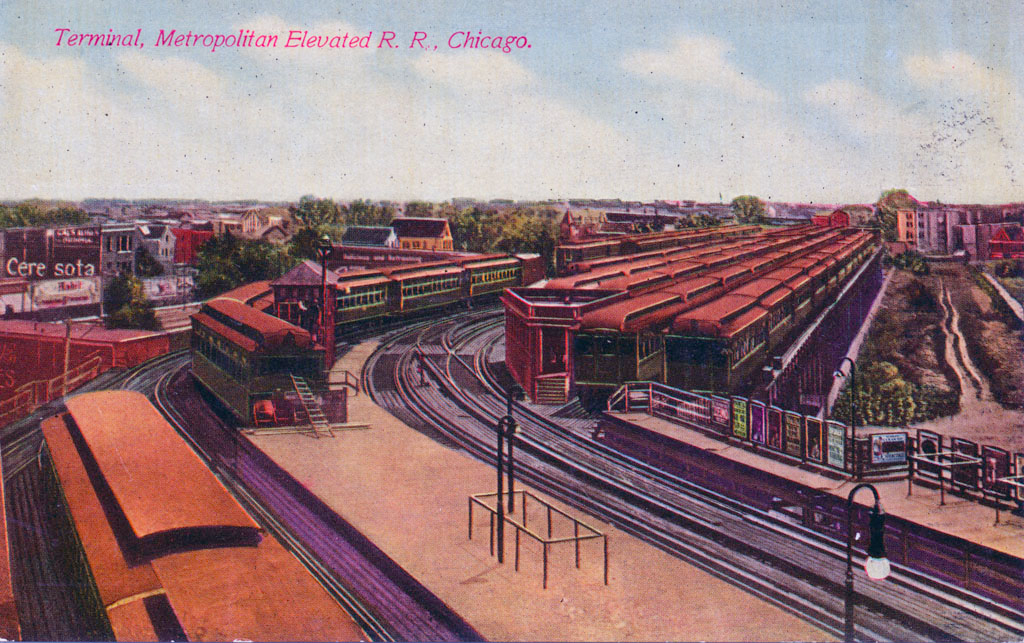
- Station platform and yard, c. 1910s

General information
- Location: Kedzie Boulevard and Linden Place; Chicago, Illinois
- Coordinates: 41°55′39″N 87°42′24″W
- Owner: Chicago Transit Authority (1947–1970); Chicago Rapid Transit Company (1924–1947); See text before 1924
- Line: Logan Square branch
- Platforms: 1 island platform, 1 side platform
- Tracks: 3

Construction
- Structure type: Elevated

History
- Opened: May 25, 1895; 131 years ago
- Closed: February 1, 1970; 56 years ago

Former services
| Preceding station | Chicago "L" | Following station |
|---|---|---|
| Terminus | Logan Square branch | California toward Marshfield |
Location

Logan Square was an elevated rapid transit station on the Chicago "L", serving the Logan Square branch and the Logan Square neighborhood. It opened in 1895 and, until 1970, served as the terminal of the West-Northwest Route, the predecessor of the Blue Line. The elevated station was demolished that year after the route was extended via the Kennedy Expressway to Jefferson Park, and was replaced by a subway station of the same name.

== History ==
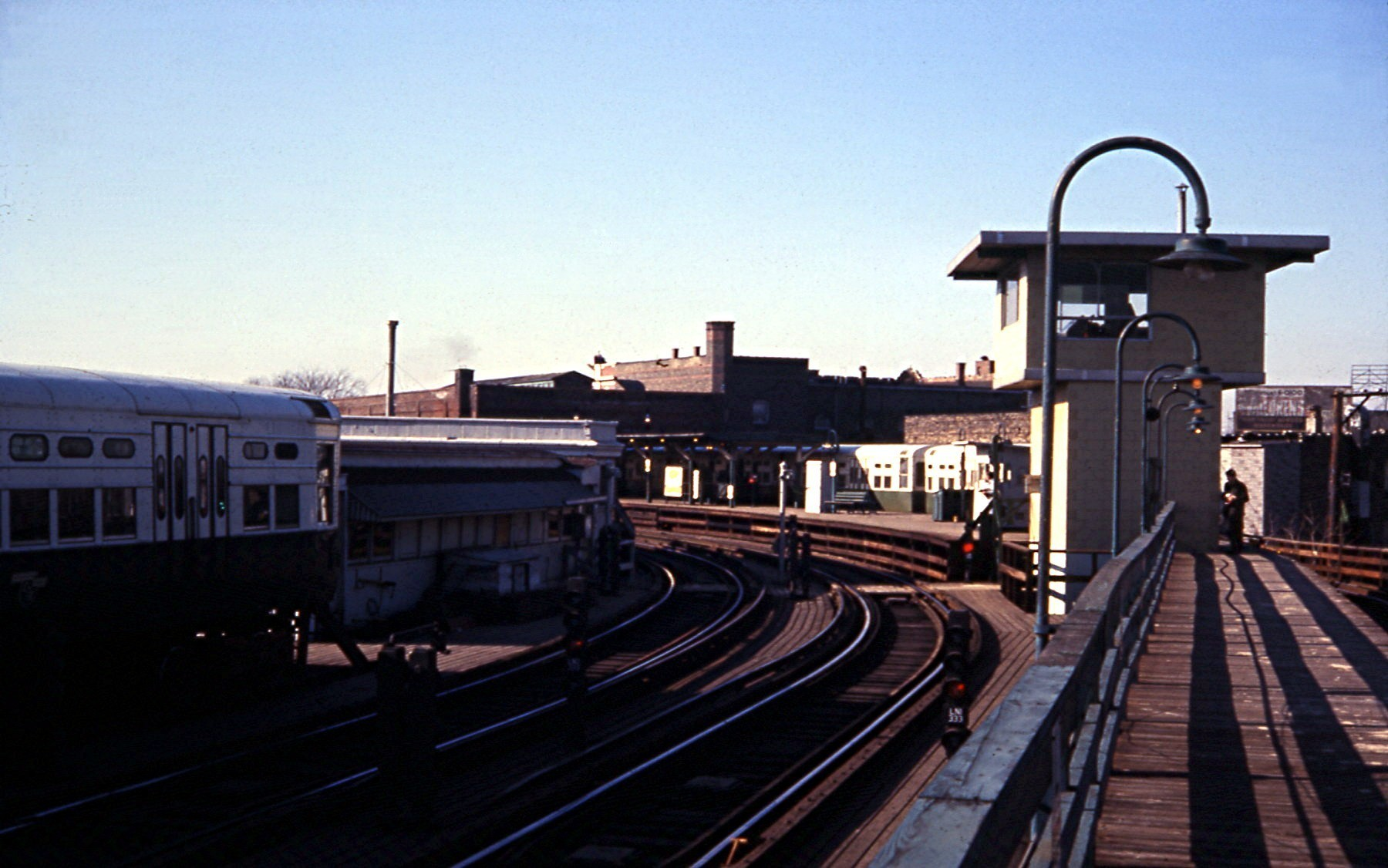
The older elevated station, later demolished after the new subway station opened

The elevated station was opened in 1895 as part of an extension of the Metropolitan West Side Elevated line. The older Logan Square station was the terminal of the West-Northwest Route (the predecessor to the Blue Line) until 1970, when the line was extended via the Kennedy Expressway to Jefferson Park. The elevated station was demolished and replaced with a subway station.

== Station details ==
=== Operations and connections ===
Streetcars replaced cable cars on Milwaukee Avenue between Lawrence and downtown on August 19, 1906. An extension route from Lawrence to Imlay, near the Forest Preserve, opened on December 11, 1914, and the lines were through-routed on October 1, 1927. Streetcars were typically one car each in Chicago; two-car multiple-unit control trains ran on Milwaukee Avenue between March 2, 1925 and May 5, 1929. As of 1928, the line had owl service between 1:05 and 5:35 a.m., wherein cars to Devon Avenue ran every 15 minutes and cars to Gale Street ran every 30 minutes; during the day, streetcars in Chicago typically had intervals of eight to fifteen minutes. Buses replaced streetcars on weekends on October 28, 1951, and altogether on May 11, 1952.

Starting on December 31, 1915, streetcars on "Through Route 17" (T.R. 17), a route that stretched from 67th Street up to Foster Avenue and switched between Kedzie and California Avenues, began to use Milwaukee Avenue rather than Elston farther north to make this switch. As of 1928, T.R. 17 had owl service between 1 and 4:30 a.m., with night cars running every 15 minutes; all cars went between 47th and Kedzie and California and Milwaukee, and alternating between going up to Roscoe and California or Bryn Mawr and Kedzie on the north end, and 47th and Kedzie or 67th and Kedzie at the south end. The Kedzie-Homan bus replaced T.R. 17 streetcars on December 4, 1949, but local streetcars continued on weekends until May 11, 1952, and on weekdays until May 29, 1954.

== Works cited ==
- Lind, Alan R. (1974). Chicago Surface Lines: An Illustrated History. Park Forest, Illinois: Transport History Press.
