= LaSalle station (CTA) =

Chicago "L" station

LaSalle 140W 500S
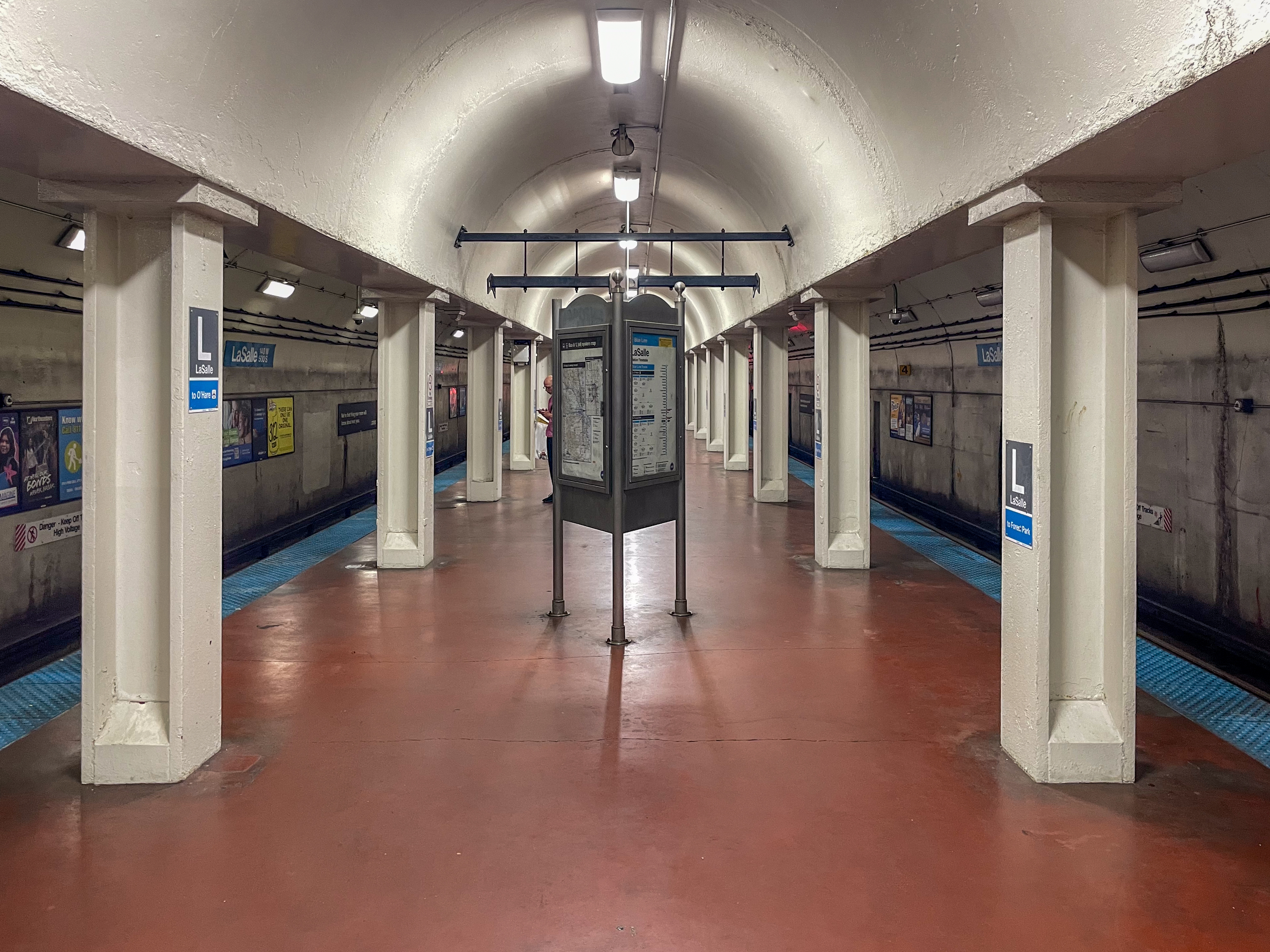

General information
- Location: 150 West Ida B. Wells Drive; Chicago, Illinois 60605
- Coordinates: 41.875568°N 87.631722°W
- Owner: City of Chicago
- Line: Milwaukee–Dearborn subway
- Platforms: 1 island platform
- Tracks: 2
- Connections: at LaSalle Street

Construction
- Structure type: Subway
- Depth: 49 feet (15 m)
- Cycle facilities: Yes
- Accessible: No

History
- Opened: February 25, 1951; 75 years ago
- Former names: Congress Terminal

Passengers
- 2025: 559,402 ▲3.4%

Services
Preceding station	Chicago "L"	Following station
Clinton toward Forest Park	Blue Line	Jackson toward O'Hare
Track layout
Location

LaSalle is an 'L' station on the CTA's Blue Line. It is a subway station with a single island platform located at 150 West Ida B. Wells Drive in the Loop district of Chicago, Illinois.

== History ==
LaSalle station opened on February 25, 1951, as the southern terminal of the Milwaukee-Dearborn subway on the CTA's Milwaukee Avenue route. It remained a terminal station until it was connected to the new Congress Expressway route in June 1958.

== Location ==
The station is located at 150 West Ida B. Wells Drive in the Loop district of Chicago, Illinois. It is the closest station to LaSalle Street Station, terminal for Rock Island District Metra trains.

== Bus and rail connections ==
CTA

- 24 Wentworth (weekdays only)
- 36 Broadway

Metra

- Rock Island (at LaSalle Street Station)
