= Monroe station (CTA Blue Line) =

Chicago "L" station

Monroe 100S 36W
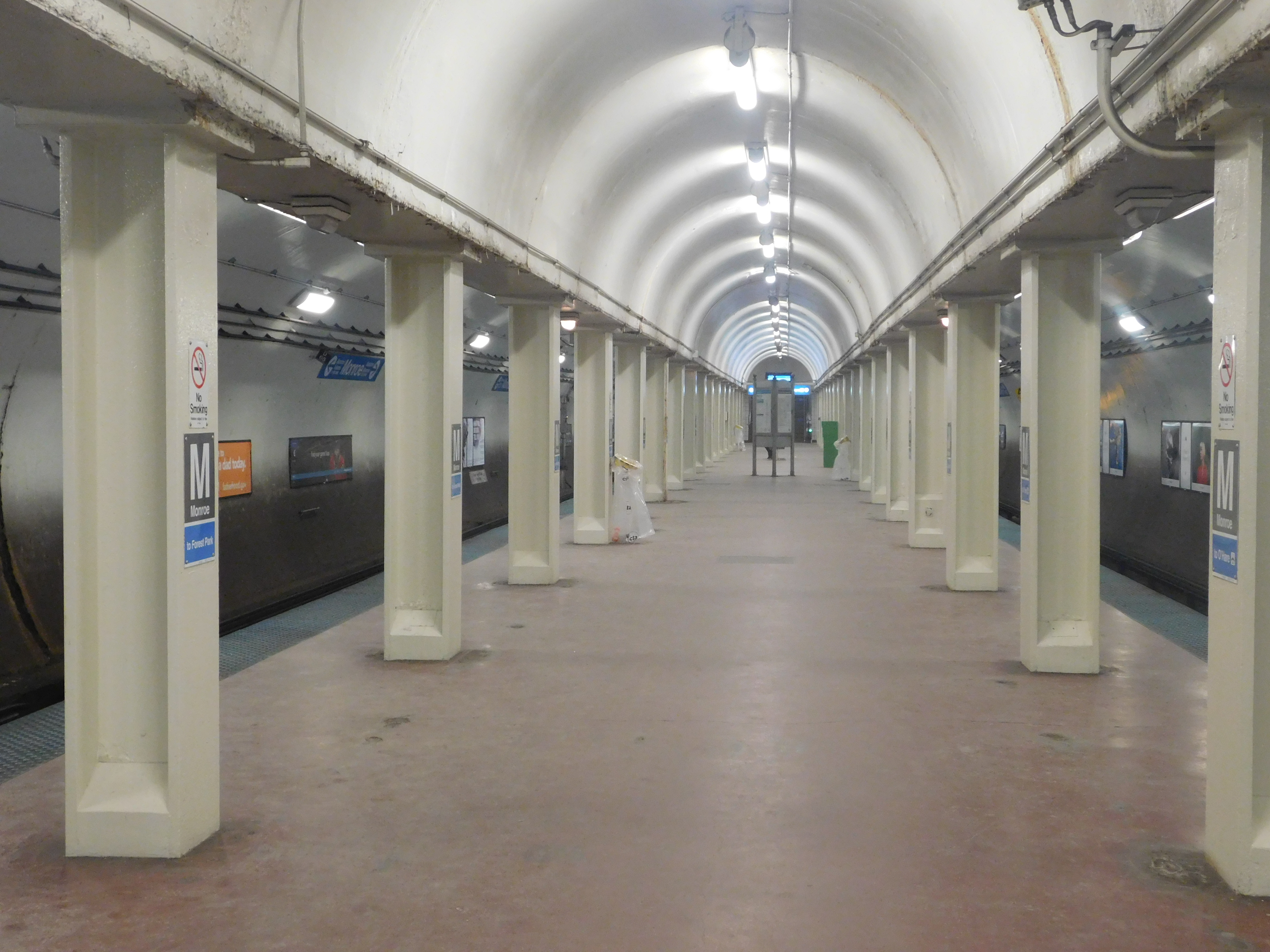

General information
- Location: 114 South Dearborn Street; Chicago, Illinois 60603
- Coordinates: 41.880703°N 87.629378°W
- Owner: City of Chicago
- Line: Milwaukee–Dearborn subway
- Platforms: 1 island platform
- Tracks: 2

Construction
- Structure type: Subway
- Depth: 47 feet (14 m)
- Cycle facilities: Yes
- Accessible: No

History
- Opened: February 25, 1951; 75 years ago

Passengers
- 2025: 1,130,903 ▲2.5%

Services
Preceding station	Chicago "L"	Following station
Washington toward O'Hare	Blue Line	Jackson toward Forest Park
Track layout
Location

Monroe is a subway station on the Chicago Transit Authority's 'L' system, serving the Blue Line. It is located in the Chicago Loop, Chicago's downtown district.

== History ==
Although the work on the station under Dearborn Street began in March 1939, the construction of the Milwaukee–Dearborn subway and the station was suspended in 1942 because of wartime material shortages. Therefore, commuters had to wait nine years for the station to open after construction was suspended in 1942. Monroe opened on February 25, 1951, fourteen years after the project was approved by the Chicago Rapid Transit Company in 1937.

In 1969, the stairs to the northwest corner of Dearborn Street and Monroe Street were closed to allow the construction of the First National Bank Building and Plaza (later renamed Bank One Plaza and subsequently Chase Tower) after the completion of a new entry was added in the lower level of the tower to the station. Monroe station was completely refurbished in 1982, but it remained inaccessible to people with disabilities.

This is the middle of the three stations on one long continuous platform underneath Dearborn Street, The other two stations are Washington and Jackson.

== Bus connections ==
CTA

- 22 Clark (Owl Service)
- 24 Wentworth (weekdays only)
- 36 Broadway
- 62 Archer (Owl Service)
- 126 Jackson
- 151 Sheridan
