= Jackson station (CTA Blue Line) =

Chicago "L" station

Jackson 300S 36W
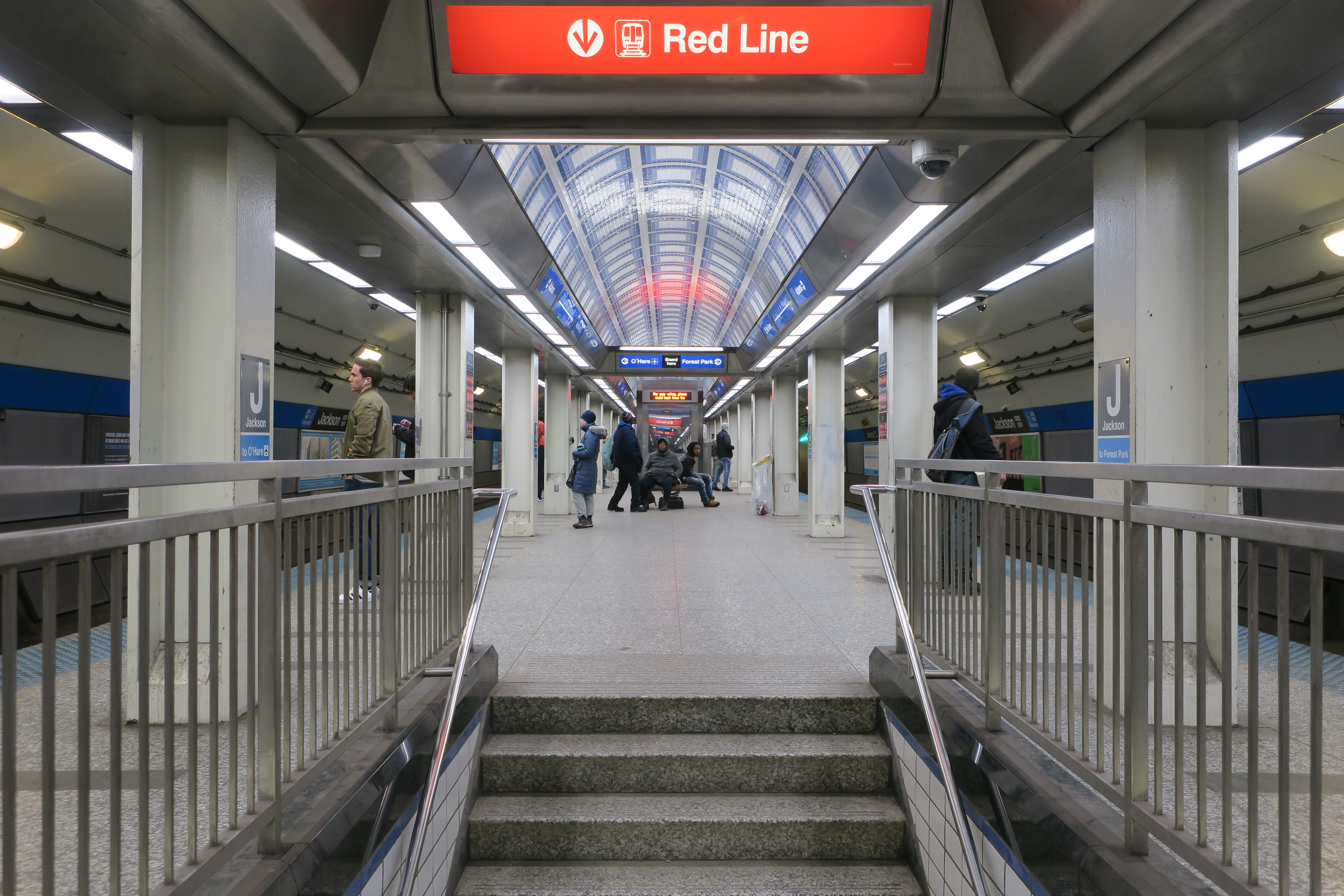
- Station platform with the stairs to the Red Line Jackson station

General information
- Location: 328 South Dearborn Street; Chicago, Illinois 60604
- Coordinates: 41.878183°N 87.629296°W
- Owner: City of Chicago
- Line: Milwaukee–Dearborn subway
- Platforms: 1 island platform
- Tracks: 2
- Connections: Red at Jackson; Brown Orange Pink Purple at Library

Construction
- Structure type: Subway
- Depth: 46 ft (14 m)
- Cycle facilities: Yes
- Accessible: Yes

History
- Opened: February 25, 1951; 75 years ago
- Rebuilt: 1989–1991; 35 years ago (Adams-Jackson mezzanine), 2005–2007; 19 years ago (Jackson-Van Buren mezzanine, platform)

Passengers
- 2025: 1,300,608 ▲19.3%

Services
Preceding station	Chicago "L"	Following station
Monroe toward O'Hare	Blue Line	LaSalle toward Forest Park
Track layout
Location

Jackson is an 'L' station on the CTA's Blue Line, located in the Loop.

== History ==
Like the rest of the Milwaukee-Dearborn subway (excluding Clinton), the station opened on February 25, 1951, following construction delays caused by World War II.

This station was renovated from 2005 to 2007, to resemble the Jackson station in the State Street subway. A pedestrian tunnel connects these two stations, allowing for a free transfer to the Red Line. Farecard transfers to the Harold Washington Library–State/Van Buren station are also available at this station for the Brown, Orange, Pink, and Purple Lines.

This is the southernmost of the three stations on one long continuous platform underneath Dearborn Street, with the stops at Monroe and Washington being the other two.

It is currently one of only two stations in the Milwaukee-Dearborn subway that is accessible, the other being Clark/Lake.

== Bus connections ==
CTA

- 1 Bronzeville/Union Station (weekday rush hours only)
- 7 Harrison (weekdays only)
- 22 Clark (Owl Service)
- 24 Wentworth (weekdays only)
- 28 Stony Island (weekday rush hours only)
- 36 Broadway
- 62 Archer (Owl Service)
- 126 Jackson
- 130 Museum Campus (Memorial Day–Labor Day Only)
- 146 Inner Lake Shore/Michigan Express
- 151 Sheridan
