= California station (CTA Blue Line) =

Chicago rapid transit station

California 2800W 2300N
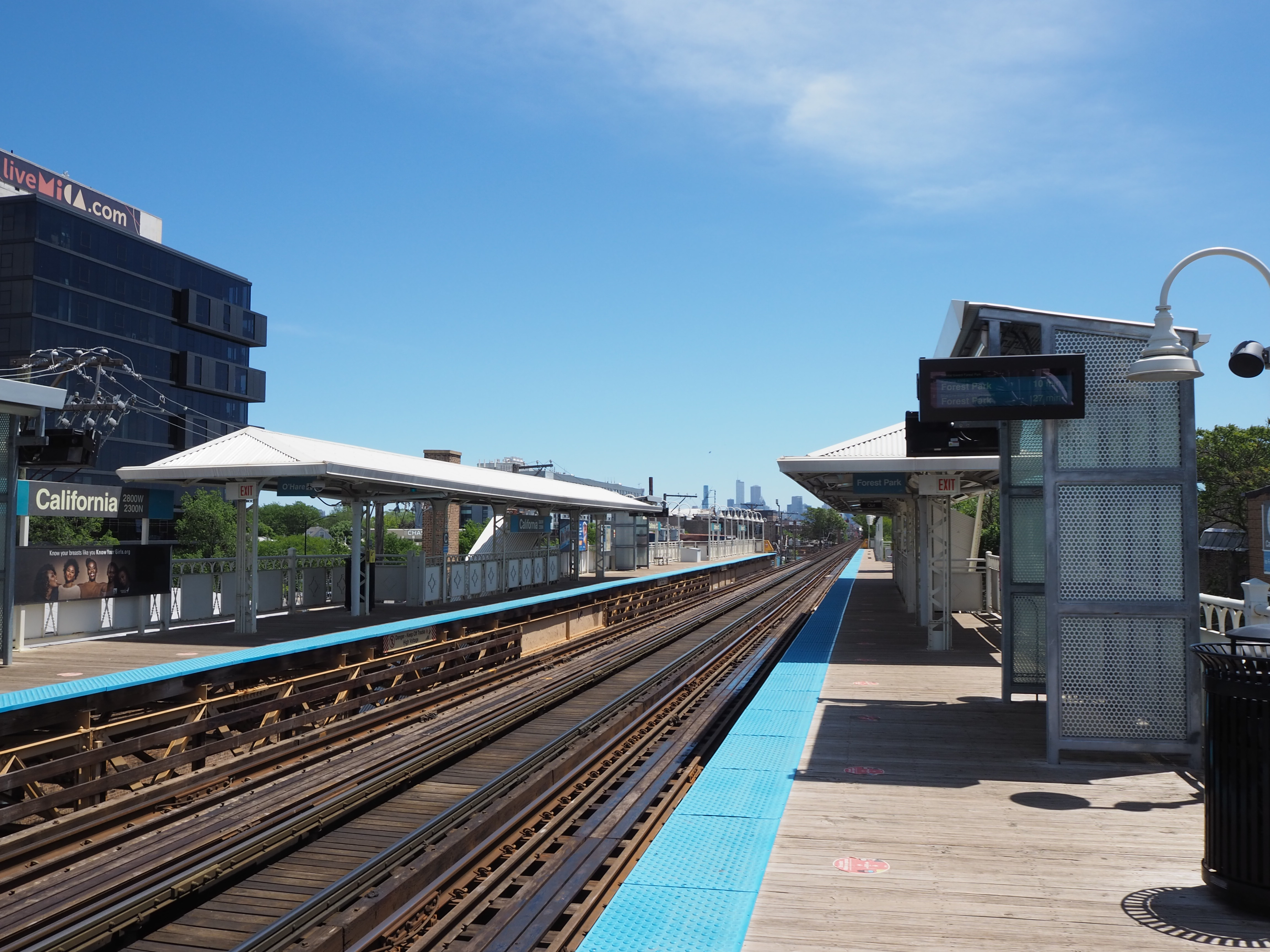

General information
- Location: 2211 North California Avenue; Chicago, Illinois 60647
- Coordinates: 41°55′20″N 87°41′50″W
- Owner: Chicago Transit Authority
- Line: Logan Square branch (O'Hare Branch)
- Platforms: 2 side platforms
- Tracks: 2

Construction
- Structure type: Elevated
- Cycle facilities: Yes
- Accessible: No

History
- Opened: May 25, 1895; 131 years ago
- Rebuilt: 2014; 12 years ago

Passengers
- 2025: 1,125,850 ▲12.3%

Services
Preceding station	Chicago "L"	Following station
Logan Square toward O'Hare	Blue Line	Western toward Forest Park
Former services
Preceding station	Chicago "L"	Following station
Logan Square Closed 1970 Terminus	Logan Square branch	Western toward Marshfield
Track layout
Location

California is a station on the Chicago Transit Authority's 'L' system, serving the Blue Line, From California, trains run every 2–7 minutes during rush-hour periods, and take 12 minutes to reach the Loop.

California, the other two stations on the Logan Square branch, and Forest Park are the only Blue Line stations that are not located in an expressway median, or underground. The Logan Square branch stations are also the only stations on the Blue Line to have side platforms; all other stations use island platforms or for O'Hare, a bay platform.

== History ==
California station opened on May 25, 1895, as part of the Metropolitan West Side Elevated's Logan Square branch. In Summer 2008, a temporary entrance immediately to the north of the station house was utilized for two weeks in order to renovate the station house. After stripping the interior, and removing the joist-supported wooden floor, the former crawl space was filled with gravel and covered by a concrete slab, the surface of which was patterned to imitate cobblestone. The repositioned agent box and farecard vending machines substantially increased the pedestrian traffic efficiency through the station house.

The station closed during September and October 2014 for major repairs, but the renovation plans did not include retrofitting the stop so that the elevated platform would be accessible to disabled passengers. The reopening ceremony on October 16 was attended by dignitaries including Rahm Emanuel and Dick Durbin.

In October 2026, the Chicago Transit Board awarded a contract for making the station accessible, which is expected to cost up to $40 million and begin construction in late 2027. The project is part of the CTA's All Station Accessiblity Program, which aims to make every 'L' station accessible.

== Station details ==
=== Operations and connections ===
Streetcars replaced cable cars on Milwaukee Avenue between Lawrence and downtown on August 19, 1906. An extension route from Lawrence to Imlay, near the Forest Preserve, opened on December 11, 1914, and the lines were through-routed on October 1, 1927. Streetcars were typically one car each in Chicago; two-car multiple-unit control trains ran on Milwaukee Avenue between March 2, 1925 and May 5, 1929. As of 1928, the line had owl service between 1:05 and 5:35 a.m., wherein cars to Devon Avenue ran every 15 minutes and cars to Gale Street ran every 30 minutes; during the day, streetcars in Chicago typically had intervals of eight to fifteen minutes. Buses replaced streetcars on weekends on October 28, 1951, and altogether on May 11, 1952.

A streetcar service ran on Fullerton Avenue from Halsted Street to Milwaukee Avenue starting in 1895, being extended west to Pulaski in 1909. A further extension west to Cicero took place on September 9, 1914, and to Long Avenue via shuttle absorption on October 21, 1918, and was finally extended to Central Avenue on October 10, 1928. As of 1928, it had owl service between 1:04 and 4:43 a.m., where cars ran at intervals of eight, 24, and 30 minutes. Trolleybuses replaced streetcars on December 4, 1949.

"Through Route 17" (T.R. 17), a streetcar line using Kedzie and California Avenues, began on February 1, 1911, between 63rd and Kedzie and California and Elston; using Chicago Avenue to connect Kedzie and California. Also in 1911, local cars ran through the route north of 22nd Street. Starting on February 7, 1913, T.R. 17 was extended on Elston and Kedzie to Lawrence Avenue; after December 31, 1915, Milwaukee was used instead of Elston to switch from California to Kedzie. T.R. 17 was extended north to Foster on November 1, 1915, and further to Bryn Mawr on October 5, 1924. As of 1928, T.R. 17 had owl service between 1 and 4:30 a.m., with night cars running every 15 minutes; all cars went between 47th and Kedzie and California and Milwaukee, and alternating between going up to Roscoe and California or Bryn Mawr and Kedzie on the north end, and 47th and Kedzie or 67th and Kedzie at the south end. The Kedzie-Homan bus replaced T.R. 17 streetcars on December 4, 1949, but local streetcars continued on weekends until May 11, 1952, and on weekdays until May 29, 1954.

== Bus connections ==
CTA

- 56 Milwaukee
- 94 California
