= Addison station (CTA Blue Line) =

Chicago "L" station

Addison 3600N 3600W
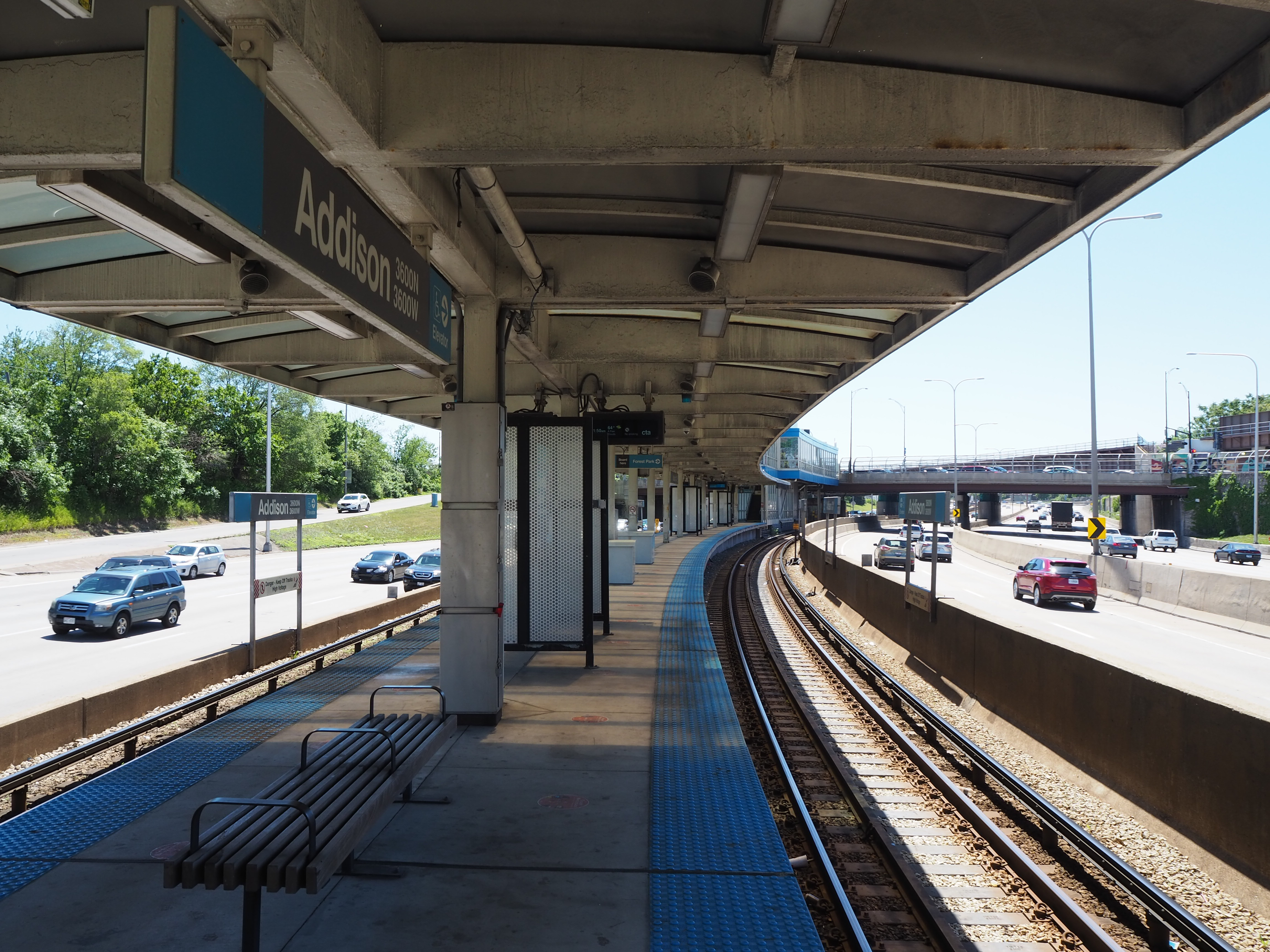

General information
- Location: 3622 West Addison Street; Chicago, Illinois 60618
- Coordinates: 41°56′51″N 87°43′09″W
- Owner: Chicago Transit Authority
- Line: O'Hare Branch
- Platforms: 1 Island platform
- Tracks: 2

Construction
- Structure type: Expressway median
- Cycle facilities: Yes
- Accessible: Yes

History
- Opened: February 1, 1970; 56 years ago
- Rebuilt: 2016; 10 years ago

Passengers
- 2025: 569,806 ▲5.9%

Services
Preceding station	Chicago "L"	Following station
Irving Park toward O'Hare	Blue Line	Belmont toward Forest Park
Former services
Preceding station	Chicago and North Western Railway	Following station
Irving Park toward Crystal Lake	Wisconsin Division	Avondale toward Chicago
Track layout
Location

Addison is a station on the Chicago Transit Authority's 'L' system, serving the Blue Line. It is also the only station whose coordinates are equal (3600 N/3600 W). It is the first station in the median of the Kennedy Expressway located between the Avondale neighborhood and Irving Park neighborhood. The Villa District is accessible by this station.

== History ==
Addison station opened in 1970 as part of an extension of the West-Northwest route to Jefferson Park in the median of the Kennedy Expressway, similar to that of Montrose station. During rush hour, trains bound for O'Hare Airport run every 4–10 minutes while trains headed for the Loop and Forest Park run every 3–10 minutes. From Addison station, trains take about 20 minutes to travel to the Loop.

== Station renovation ==
In 2016, the station underwent renovations which added the elevator, making the station accessible to passengers with disabilities.

== Bus connections ==
CTA

- 152 Addison
