= Logan Square station =

Chicago "L" station

Logan Square 3200W 2600N
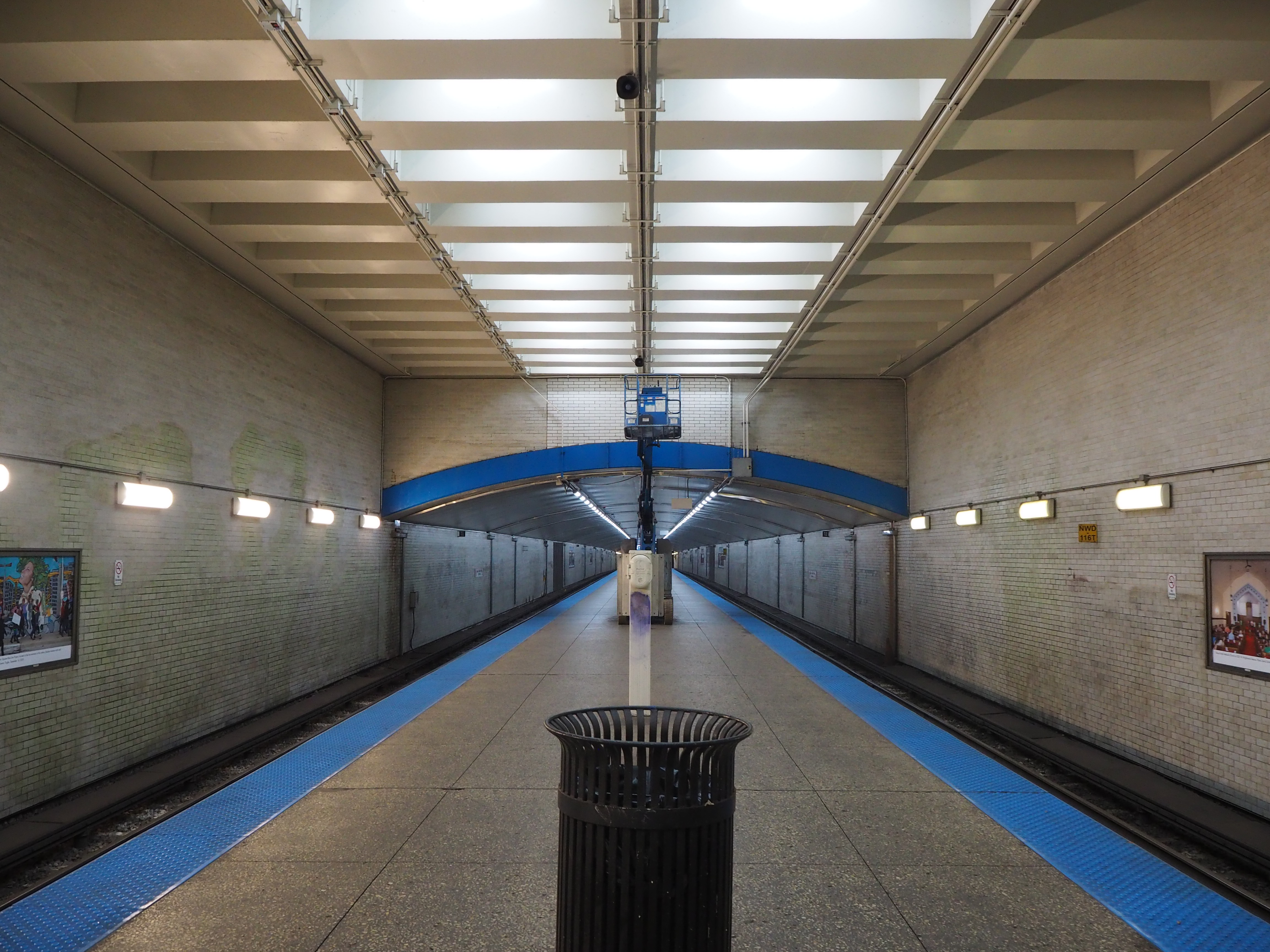
- Station platform from the Spaulding entrance

General information
- Location: 2620 North Kedzie Avenue; Chicago, Illinois 60647
- Coordinates: 41°55′47″N 87°42′31″W
- Owner: Chicago Transit Authority
- Line: Kimball Subway (O'Hare Branch)
- Platforms: 1 Island platform
- Tracks: 2

Construction
- Structure type: Subway
- Depth: 29 ft (8.8 m)
- Cycle facilities: Yes
- Accessible: Yes

History
- Opened: February 1, 1970; 56 years ago
- Rebuilt: 2000–2001; 25 years ago (Elevator added, minor renovations)

Passengers
- 2025: 1,504,853 ▲14.5%

Services
Preceding station	Chicago "L"	Following station
Belmont toward O'Hare	Blue Line	California toward Forest Park
Track layout
Location

Logan Square is a subway station on the Chicago Transit Authority's 'L' system, serving the Blue Line and the Logan Square neighborhood. It was the terminus of the Milwaukee Elevated until it was extended to Jefferson Park in 1970 via the Kennedy Expressway. From Logan Square, trains run at intervals of 2–7 minutes during rush-hour periods, and take 14 minutes to travel to the Loop. O'Hare-bound trains typically take 28 minutes to reach the airport from Logan Square.

The current station opened on February 1, 1970, replacing an earlier elevated terminal that had served the Logan Square neighborhood since 1895. Its single island platform is reached by mezzanines at Kedzie Avenue and Spaulding Avenue, and the station is wheelchair accessible.

== History ==
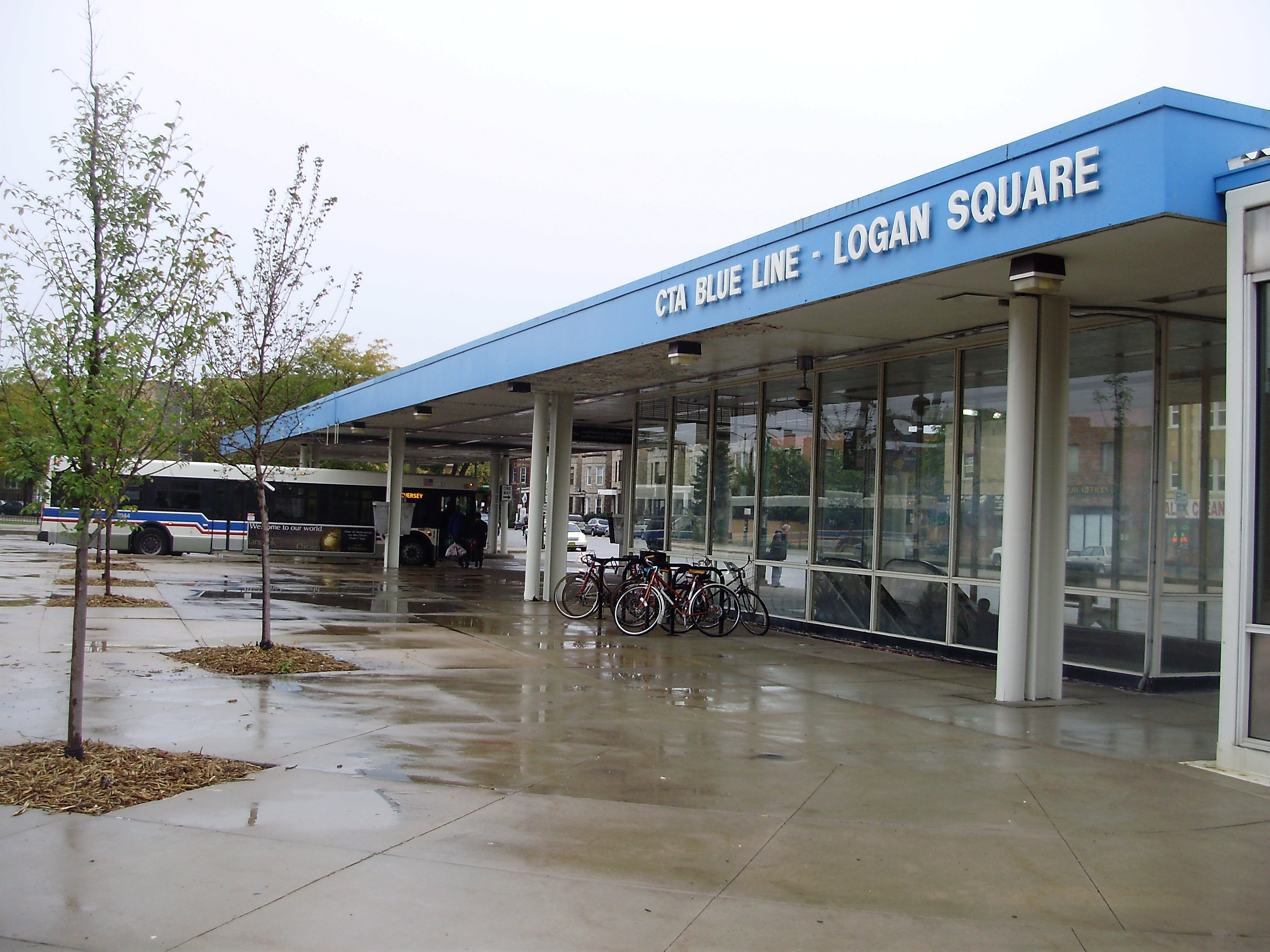
Station house

The current subway station replaced an older elevated station that opened in 1895 as part of the Metropolitan West Side Elevated line. The older Logan Square station was the terminal of the West-Northwest Route (the predecessor to the Blue Line) until 1970, when the line was extended via the Kennedy Expressway to Jefferson Park.

== Station layout ==
Logan Square features a mezzanine with faregates at each end of the platform, one at Kedzie Avenue at the southeast end of the platform and the other at Spaulding Avenue at the northeast end. The Kedzie Avenue mezzanine is fully staffed, has farecard vending machines, and has two entrances: a larger one on the north side of the intersection of Kedzie and Milwaukee Avenues with a bus stop and elevator, and a smaller one on the south side of that intersection. The Spaulding Avenue mezzanine is usually unstaffed and does not have farecard vending machines, and has an entrance on either side of Milwaukee Avenue. The platform itself, at 1,025 feet (312 m) long, is significantly longer than the length of a train and longer than Belmont's 600 feet (180 m) platform, with trains stopping at the southeast end of the platform closest to the Kedzie Avenue entrance, leaving a significant portion of the platform at the northwest end that is not directly served by trains.

The station's layout is similar to the Belmont station, the next station to the northwest, but unlike Belmont, Logan Square has a mezzanine at each end of the platform, while Belmont only has a single entrance and single mezzanine. Logan Square also has an elevator at the Kedzie entrance, while Belmont does not have any elevators.

== Bus connections ==
CTA

- 56 Milwaukee
- 76 Diversey
- 93 California/Dodge
