= Belmont station (CTA Blue Line) =

Chicago "L" station

Belmont 3200N 3400W
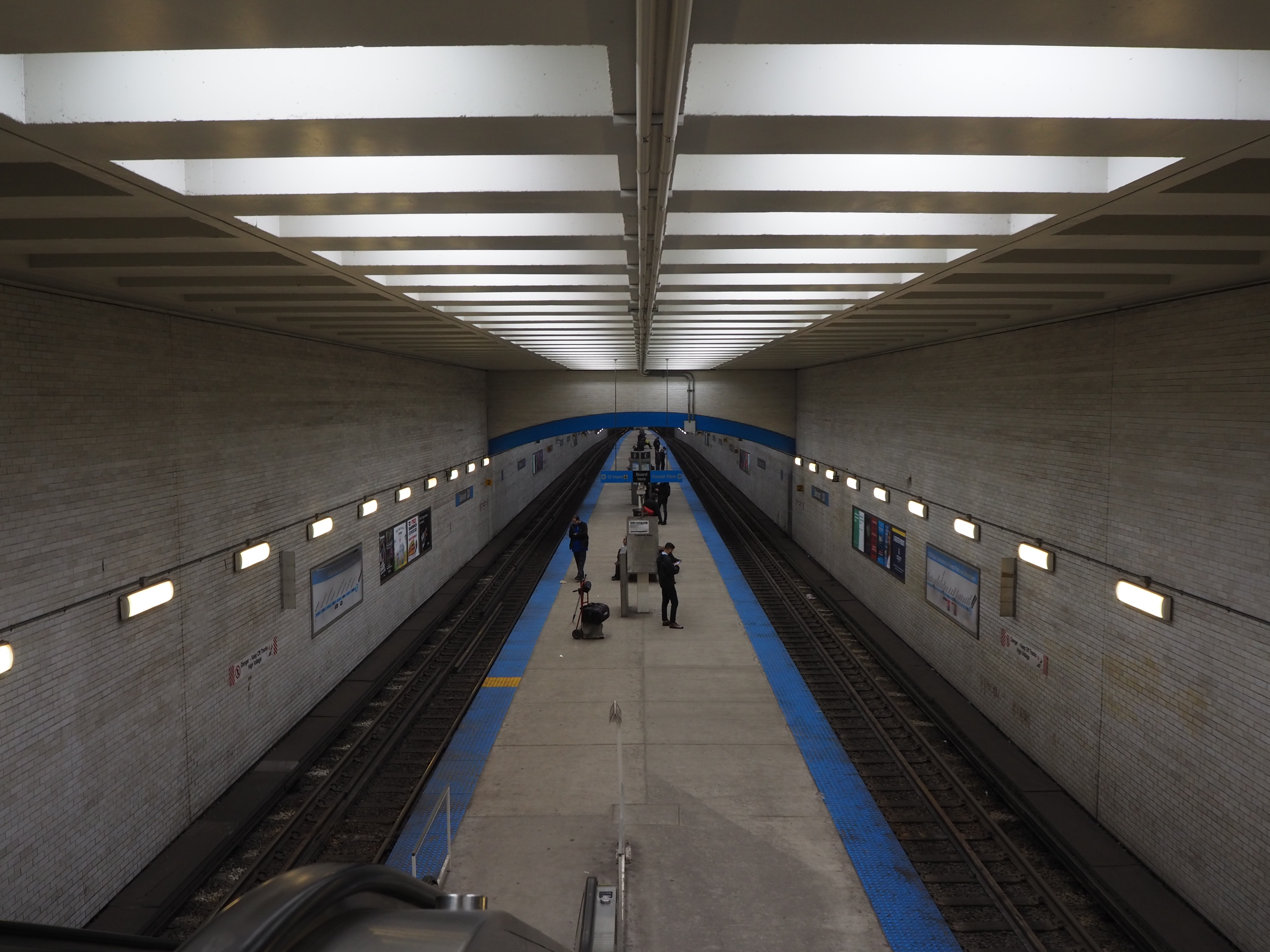

General information
- Location: 3355 West Belmont Avenue; Chicago, Illinois 60618
- Coordinates: 41°56′21″N 87°42′45″W
- Owner: Chicago Transit Authority
- Line: Kimball Subway (O'Hare Branch)
- Platforms: 1 Island platform
- Tracks: 2

Construction
- Structure type: Subway
- Depth: 27 ft (8.2 m)
- Cycle facilities: Yes
- Accessible: No

History
- Opened: February 1, 1970; 56 years ago
- Rebuilt: 2017–2019; 7 years ago

Passengers
- 2025: 1,097,141 ▲4.5%

Services
Preceding station	Chicago "L"	Following station
Addison toward O'Hare	Blue Line	Logan Square toward Forest Park
Track layout
Location

Belmont is an 'L' station on the CTA's Blue Line. The station is located at Belmont and Kimball Avenues in the Avondale neighborhood. From Belmont, trains run at intervals of 2–7 minutes during rush hours, and take 16 minutes to reach the Loop.

== History ==
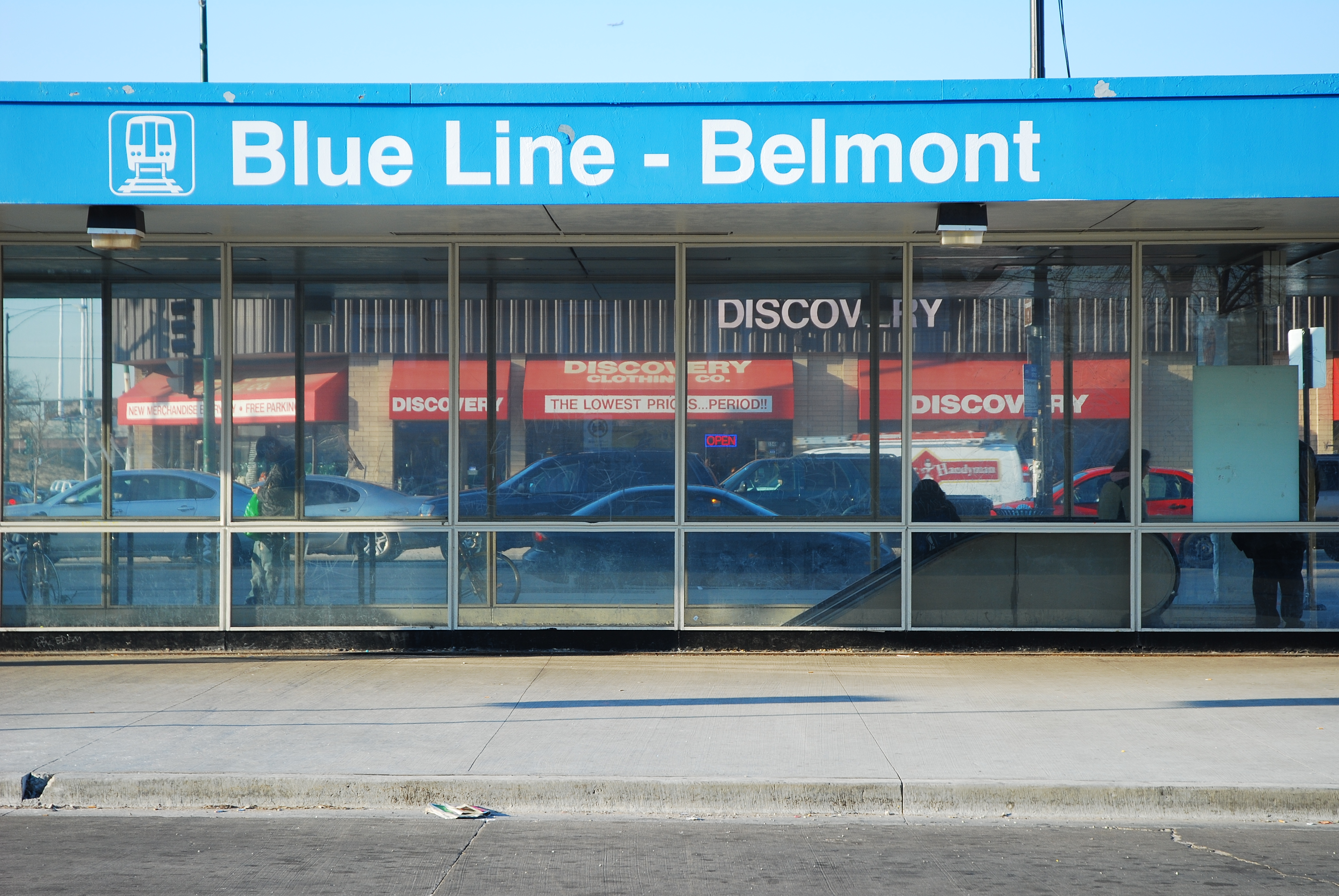
Former station house, March 2009

Belmont station opened in 1970 as part of an extension of the West-Northwest route to Jefferson Park in the median of the Kennedy Expressway. The station is similar in design as the previous station, Logan Square, as an underground, island platform station. Unlike Logan Square, Belmont has only one exit.

== Belmont Blue Gateway Project ==
The $17 million project began in 2017 and was completed on March 29, 2019, with additional work continuing on the station's platform until August 30, 2019.

== Bus connections ==
CTA

- 77 Belmont (Owl Service)
- 82 Kimball-Homan

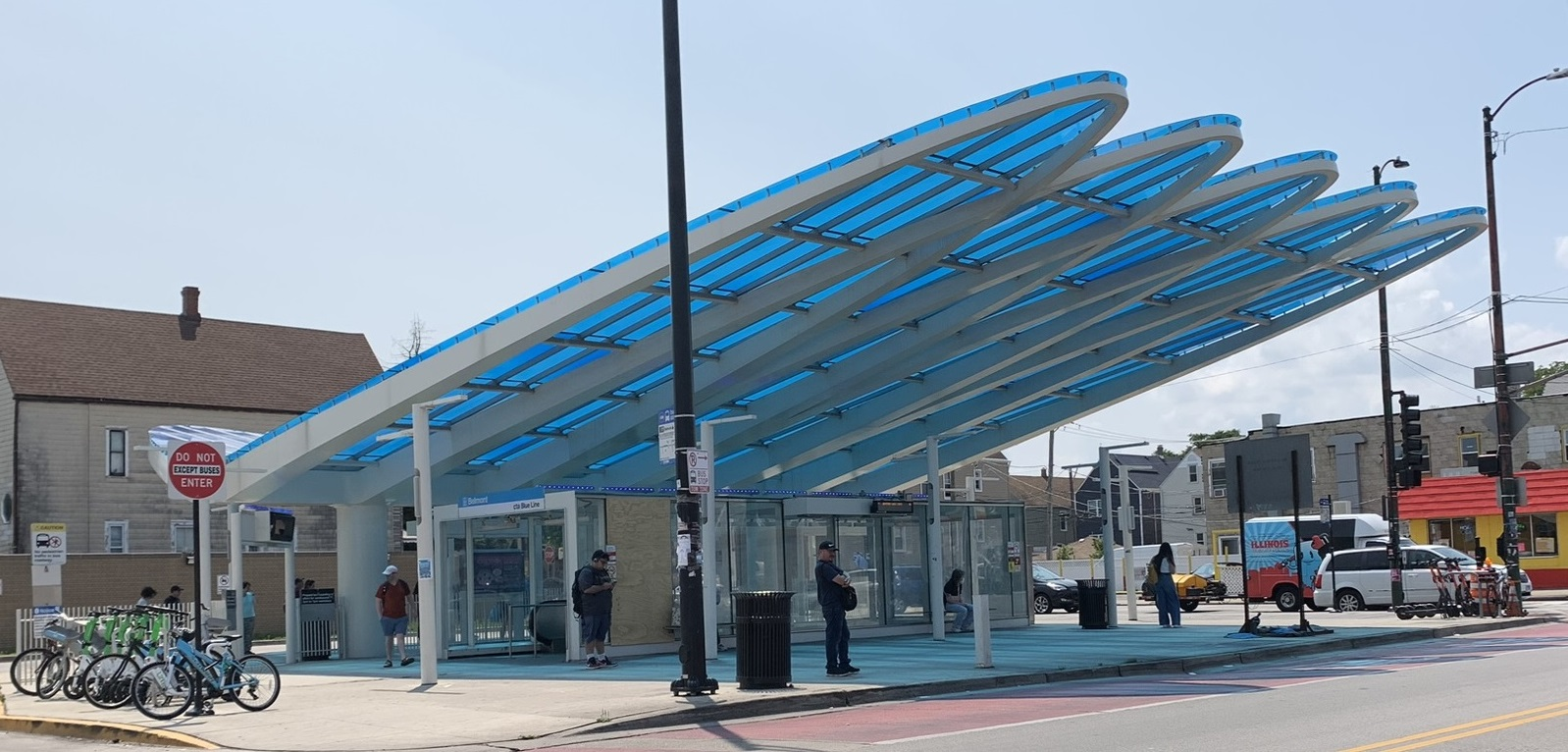
The Belmont station house in 2024
