= Blue Line (CTA) =

Chicago "L" rapid transit line

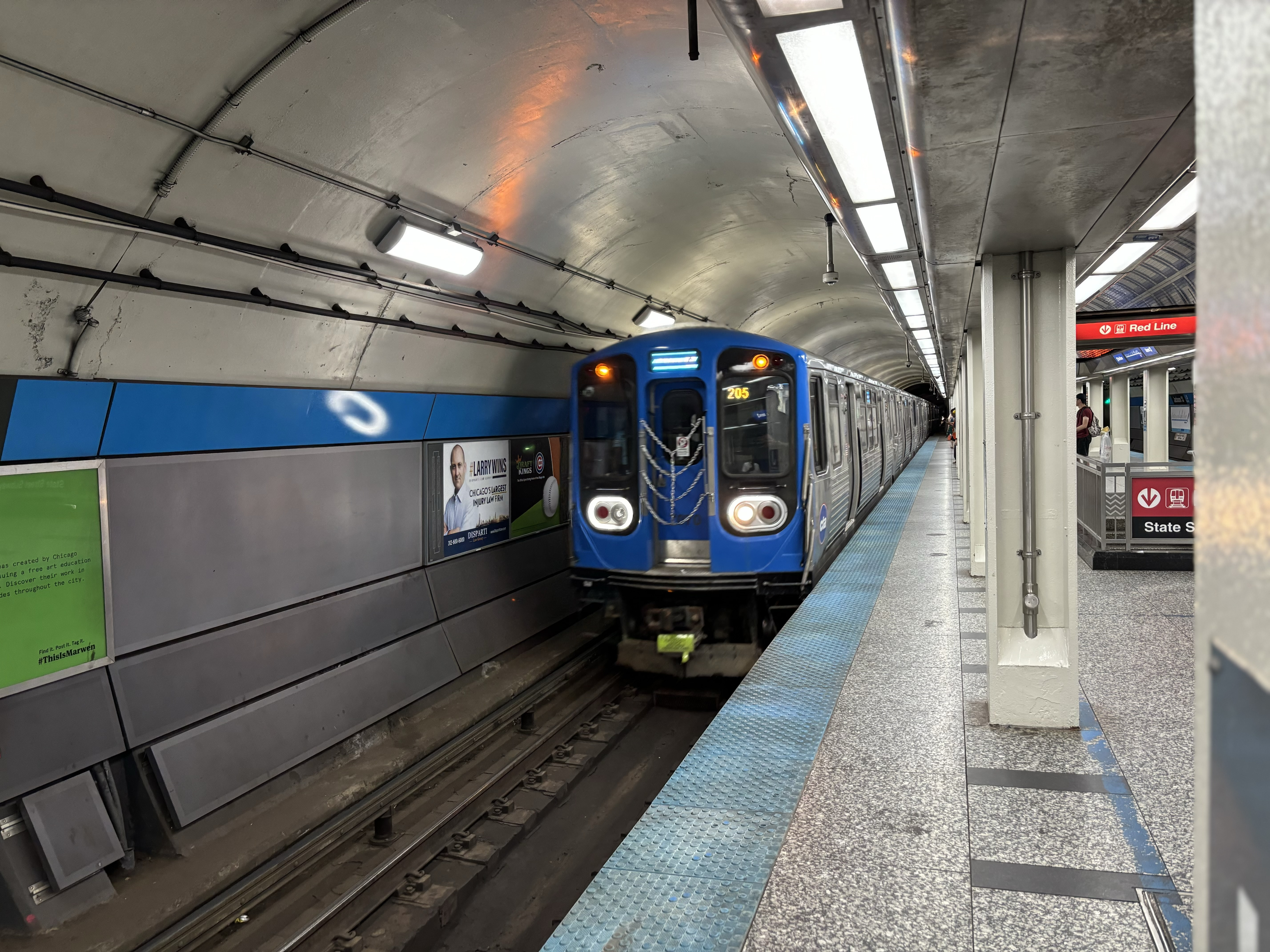
- A Blue Line train of 7000-series cars at Jackson station

Overview
- Status: Operating
- Owner: Chicago Transit Authority
- Locale: Chicago, Oak Park, Forest Park, and Rosemont, Illinois
- Termini: O'Hare; Forest Park
- Stations: 33

Service
- Type: Rapid transit
- System: Chicago "L"
- Services: O'Hare–Forest Park
- Operator: Chicago Transit Authority
- Depot(s): Desplaines Yard, Rosemont Yard
- Rolling stock: Mixed 2600- and 3200-series, 5000-series only on rush hour, 7000-series 8-car trains (typical, maximum)
- Daily ridership: 72,475 (avg. weekday 2023)

History
- Opened: May 6, 1895; 131 years ago
- Last extension: 1984

Technical
- Line length: 26.93 mi (43.3 km)
- Character: Expressway median, subway and elevated
- Track gauge: 4 ft 8 1/2 in (1,435 mm) standard gauge
- Electrification: Third rail, 600 V DC

The Blue Line is a 26.93-mile-long (43.34 km) Chicago "L" line which runs from O'Hare International Airport at the far northwest end of the city, through downtown via the Milwaukee–Dearborn subway and across the West Side to its southwest end in Forest Park, with a total of 33 stations (11 on the Forest Park branch, 9 in the Milwaukee–Dearborn subway and 13 on the O'Hare branch). It is the longest line on the Chicago "L" system and second busiest, and one of the longest local subway/elevated lines in the world. It is operated by the Chicago Transit Authority and had an average of 72,475 passengers boarding each weekday in 2023.

Before the adoption of color-coded names in 1993, the Blue Line was referred to as the West-Northwest Route, or more commonly, the O'Hare-Congress-Douglas route for its three branches. The Congress and Douglas branches were renamed for their terminals, Forest Park and 54th/Cermak. Blue Line service on the Douglas branch was replaced in April 2008 by the Pink Line. The Blue Line is one of five "L" lines that run into Chicago suburbs, with the others being the Green, Purple, Pink, and Yellow lines. The Blue Line runs in three suburbs: Rosemont, Oak Park, and Forest Park. The Blue Line also has two in-system transfers (both in the Loop), and does not share tracks with any other 'L' line. It is also the only line in Chicago with more than one station having the exact same name: two stations at Harlem Avenue and two stations on Western Avenue.

The Blue Line and Red Line offer 24-hour service every day; the Orange Line will begin 24/7 service in 2026.

== Route ==
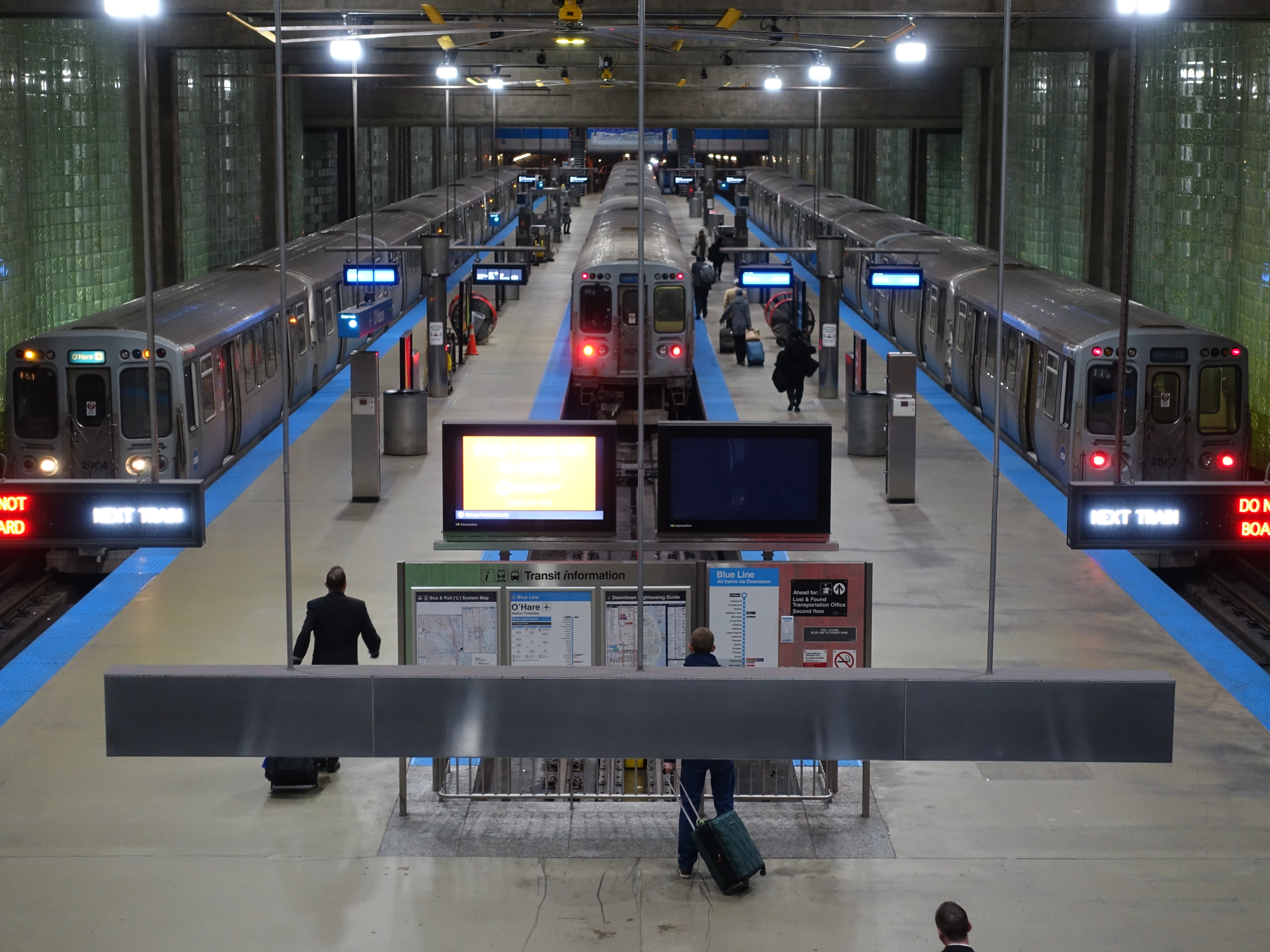
The Blue Line terminal at O'Hare International Airport

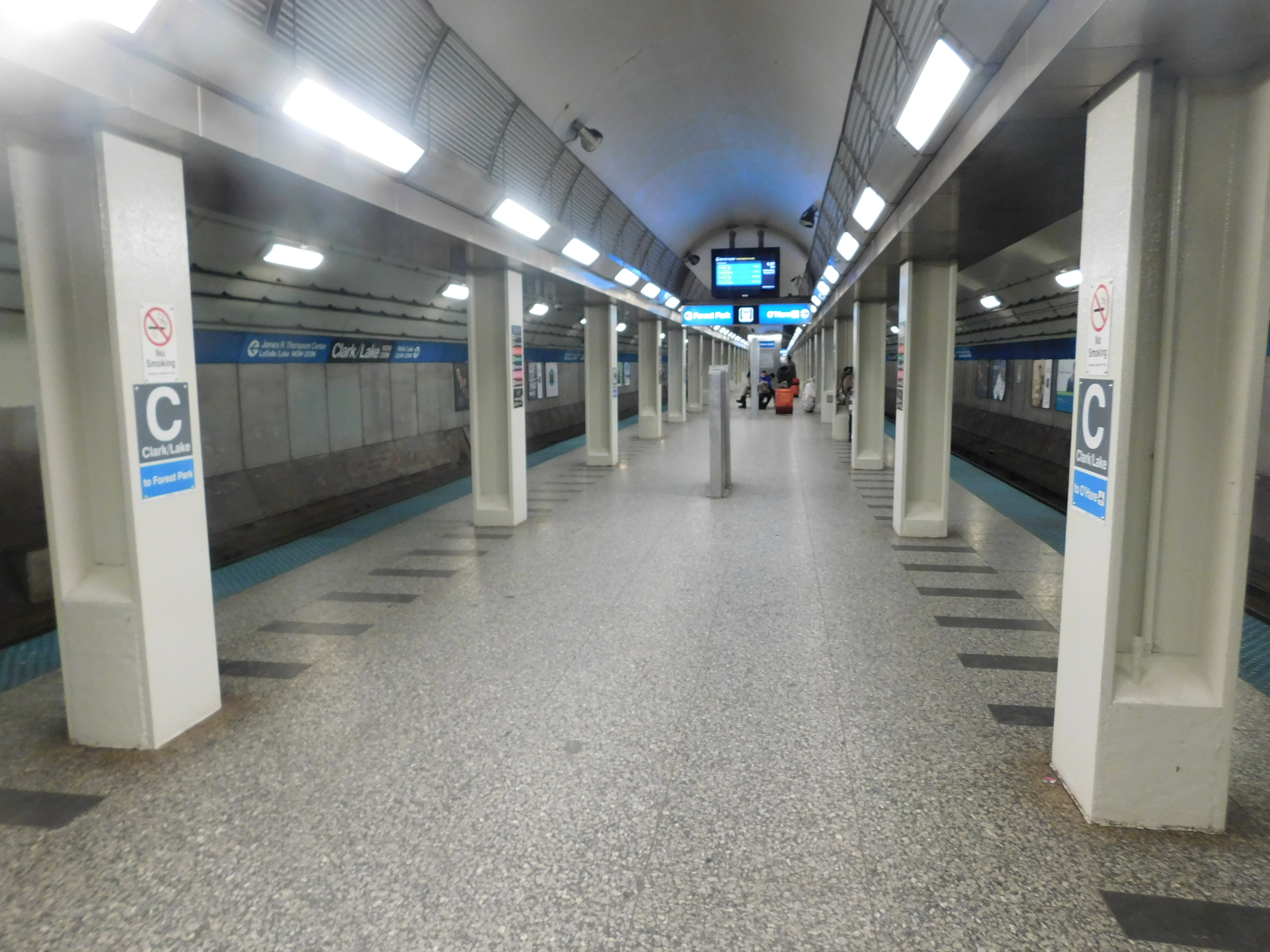
Clark/Lake station on the Milwaukee–Dearborn subway

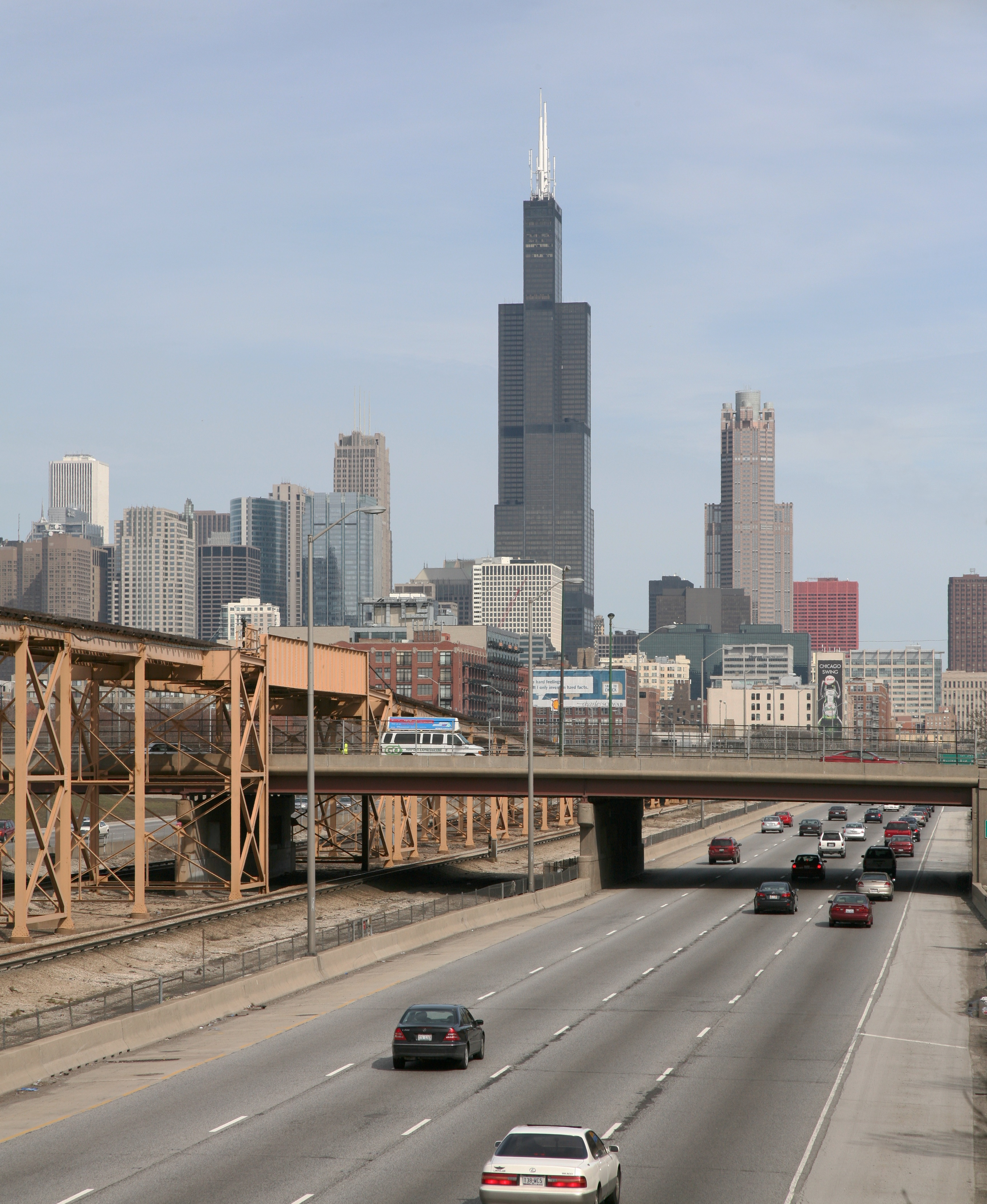
The Blue Line tracks in the median of the Eisenhower Expressway; The main line straddles the Loomis Ramp which leads to the Pink Line

=== O'Hare branch ===
The O'Hare branch is the longest section of the Blue Line (14.6 miles (23.5 km)) and comprises both the oldest and newest segments of the entire route. The line starts at O'Hare International Airport in an underground station below the airport's main parking garage, with direct pedestrian access to Terminals 1, 2 and 3. The line emerges in the median of the O'Hare main access road (Interstate 190) just northwest of Terminal 5, about a mile (1.6 km) west of Mannheim Road.

The line runs in the median of Interstate 190 east through Rosemont. The line has a station at River Road in Rosemont, which is also the location of the northern storage yard and served as a temporary terminal from 1983 to 1984 while the O'Hare station was being completed. The tracks then tunnel beneath the Kennedy Expressway/Northwest Tollway interchange near the Des Plaines River.

The line runs in the median of the Kennedy Expressway (Interstate 90) until a point southeast of Addison Street, making stops at Cumberland, Harlem, Jefferson Park, Montrose, Irving Park and Addison. Between Montrose and Irving Park, the line tunnels beneath an express lane exit. South of Addison Street, the line descends into a subway and turns south under Kimball Avenue. The line travels under Kimball Avenue and Milwaukee Avenue through Logan Square, making stops at Belmont and Logan Square.

South of Logan Square, the line emerges above ground onto an elevated structure parallel to Milwaukee Avenue. This section of structure, built in 1895 as part of the Metropolitan Elevated's Logan Square branch, is the oldest portion of the Blue Line, and the sole section of the line on an elevated viaduct. The three stations on this section (California, Western, and Damen) are also the only three stations on the line to use side platforms instead of island platforms.

=== Milwaukee–Dearborn subway ===
At the intersection of Ashland and Milwaukee Avenues, the Blue Line descends underground, swings over to Milwaukee Avenue, and continues southeast towards downtown under Milwaukee Avenue (with stops at Division, Chicago and Grand). The line then turns east under Lake Street, crossing beneath the Chicago River, and makes a stop at Clark/Lake, where in-system transfers are provided to 'L' trains on the Loop.

East of Clark/Lake, the tracks swing south under Dearborn Street, with a continuous platform similar to the continuous platform used in the adjacent State Street subway, with stops at Washington, Monroe, and Jackson.

South of Jackson, the line turns west under Ida B. Wells Drive (with stops at LaSalle and Clinton, which is two blocks south of Union Station). The tracks then emerge from a portal near UIC-Halsted in the median of the Eisenhower Expressway (Interstate 290) and continue west.

=== Forest Park branch ===
After exiting the subway, the tracks continue west in the median of the Eisenhower Expressway as the Forest Park branch, formerly called the Congress branch (though it is still internally referred to as such), the successor to the Garfield Park Branch.

Immediately west of Racine, the Forest Park branch tracks diverge to permit the Loomis ramp up to the Douglas Branch elevated structure. The ramp was formerly used in revenue service from 1958 to 2008 when the Blue Line operated over the Douglas branch and the Forest Park branch.

With the replacement of Douglas branch Blue Line service with the Pink Line, the ramp is now non-revenue trackage used for the transfer of 5000 series trains that the Blue Line borrows from the Pink Line for weekday rush hour service. The ramp is also used for non-revenue equipment movement and access to the Skokie Shops, as it's the only link between the Blue Line and the rest of the "L" system. The Forest Park branch remains in the median of the expressway through the west side of Chicago until it reaches a portal at Lotus Avenue.

At this point, the tracks pass beneath the eastbound expressway lanes before emerging on the south side of the expressway next to the CSX Transportation (Baltimore and Ohio Chicago Terminal Railroad) tracks. The route passes through Oak Park and into Forest Park. In the vicinity of Desplaines Avenue the tracks rise and make an S-curve north over the expressway before terminating at the Forest Park station.

The Forest Park branch has historically had depressed ridership due to competing for riders with both the Green and Pink Lines and running in a highway median, which discourages ridership because the air and noise pollution from passing vehicles discourages the construction of dense housing nearby and makes it unpleasant to get to and wait at the stations. But it has also suffered due to neglect of the tracks past Illinois Medical District station, with most of the infrastructure being untouched since its construction in 1958. Due to deferred maintenance and poor geotechnical engineering (e.g. drainage issues), this track has rapidly deteriorated since the 2010s, with subsequent speed restrictions further reducing ridership. In 2016, just 13.1% of the Forest Park branch was a slow zone, with some sections having official speed limits as low as 15 mph (24 km/h) but running at a maximum of 6 mph (9.7 km/h) in practice; by 2020, it had increased to 61.6%; by 2024, it increased again to 72.4%; and in 2026, slow zones accounted for 84.4% of the branch.

Between 2014 and 2024, the proliferation and increasing severity of slow zones on the Forest Park branch increased travel times by 10 minutes. Though phase 1 of the Forest Park Branch Rebuild (which rebuilt tracks and stations between LaSalle and Illinois Medical District stations) was completed in 2023 and a federal grant to rebuild two additional miles of track (between Kedzie and Pulaski stations) in 2027 was awarded to the CTA in 2024, the next 3 phases of the project to rebuild the rest of the Forest Park branch have yet to be announced.

Unfortunately for Forest Park branch riders, the CTA has no major plans for addressing most of the branch's deficiencies unless it can receive federal funds to redo the line as part of IDOT reconstructing the Eisenhower Expressway, which the CTA has been holding out for as the Eisenhower has reached the end of its useful life. Because no major work was planned for the Eisenhower in IDOT's 2022-2027 capital plan, it is unlikely any such funds will become available to improve the Forest Park branch until at least spring 2027.

== Operating hours and headways ==
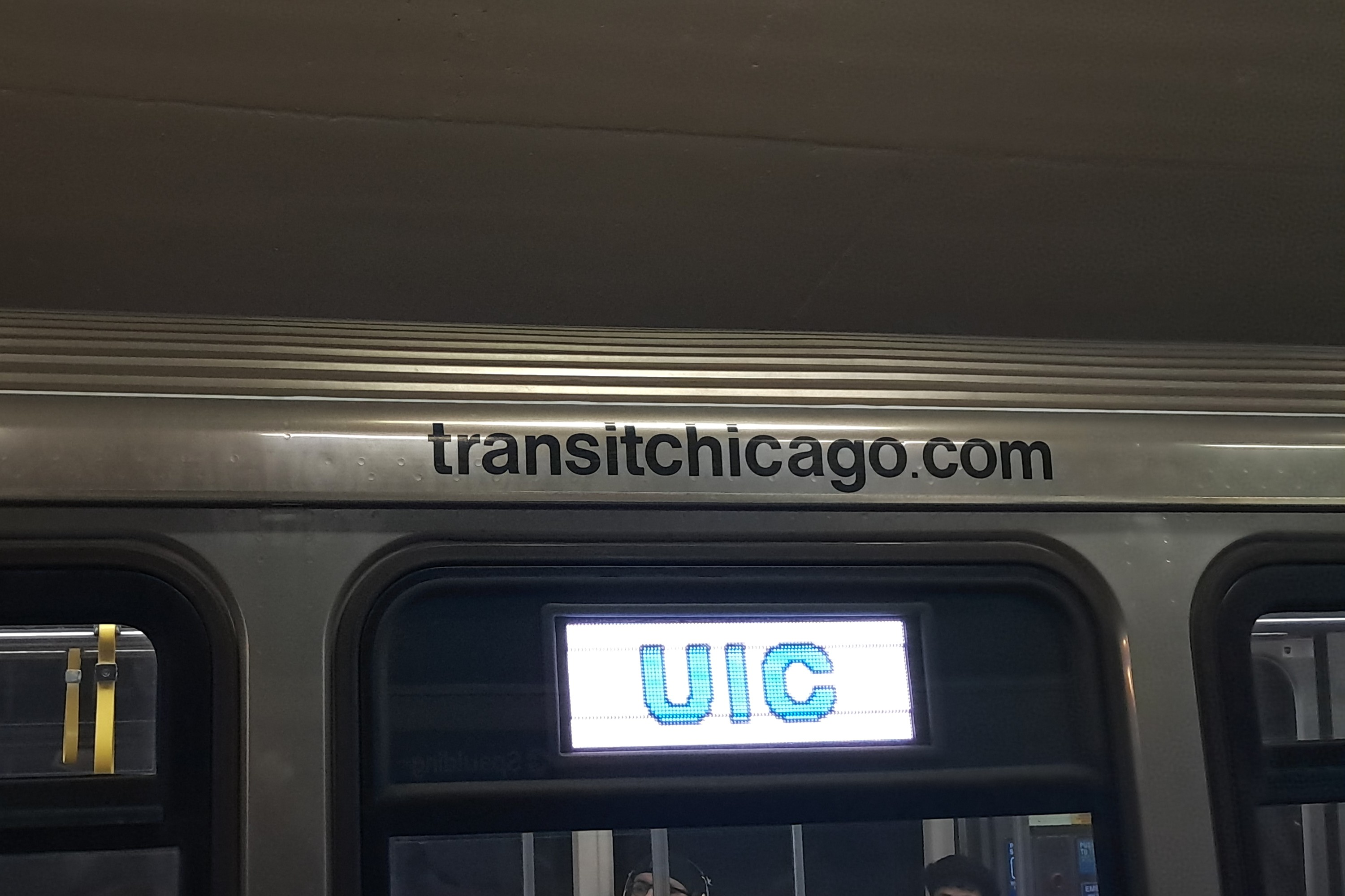
This Blue Line train operates as a short turn service to UIC–Halsted instead of Forest Park.

Like the Red Line, the Blue Line runs 24 hours a day. Most trains run between O'Hare and Forest Park stations, but others terminate at a different station along the line. On weekdays, service runs very frequently (10–20 tph (trains per hour)) during rush hour (with some trains running short turn services between UIC-Halsted and Jefferson Park or Rosemont), and 6–8 tph during the midday and nighttime.

On Saturdays, service runs 8 tph in the early morning, then increase to 10 tph during the day, then 8 tph at night. On Sundays, service runs 6–8 tph early morning, then increase to 10 tph all day, then 6 tph at night. On the weekends, every other Blue Line train operates between O'Hare and UIC-Halsted only during the daytime, doubling the headways up to 5 tph. Between approximately midnight and 5:30 a.m., night owl service on the Blue Line ranges between 3–4 tph.

== Rolling stock ==
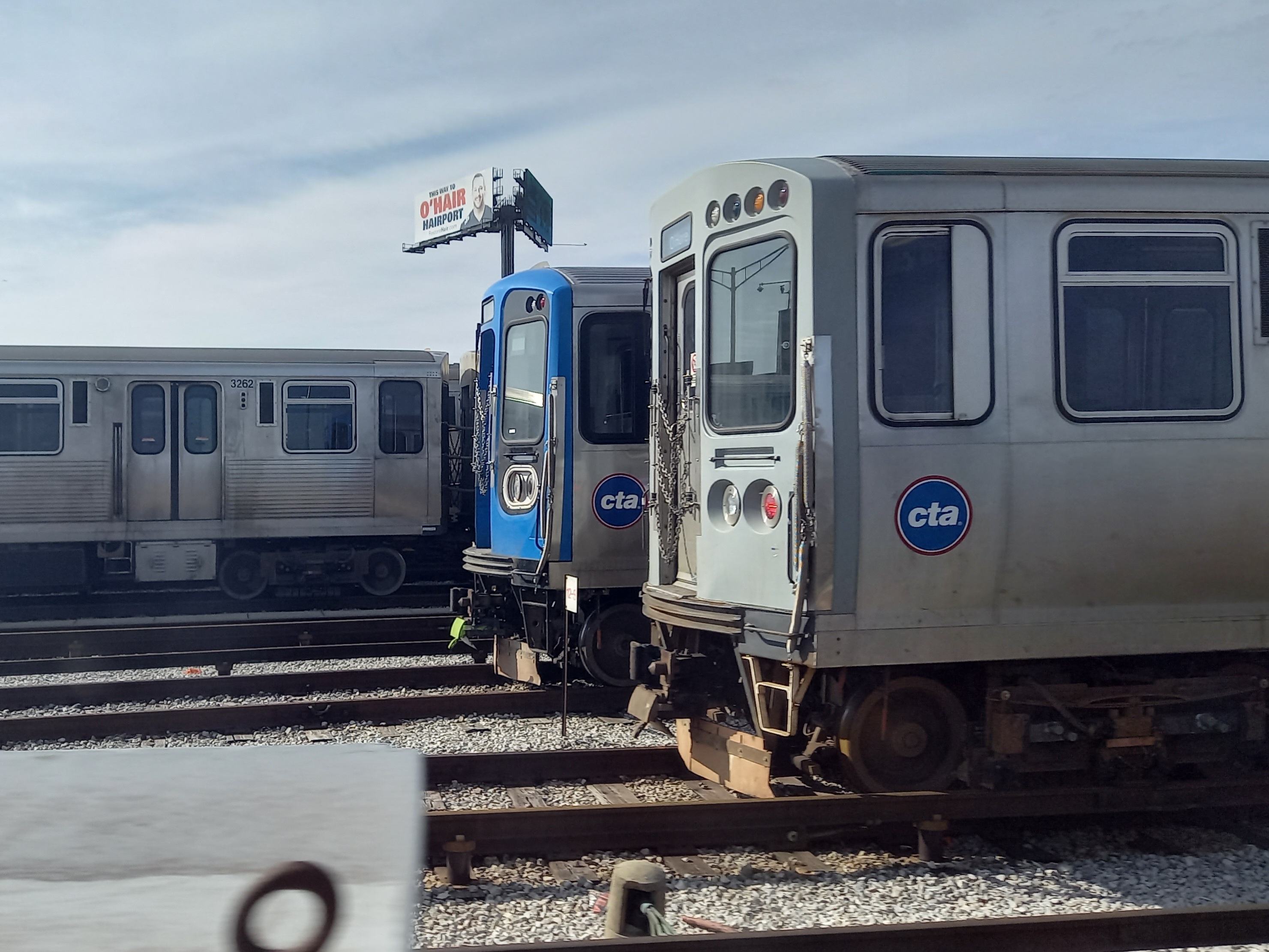
2600, 3200, and 7000 series cars at Rosemont Yard

The Blue Line is operated with 2600-series, 3200-series, and 7000-series railcars. In 2018, some of the 2600-series cars from the Blue Line fleet were replaced with rehabbed 3200-series cars from the Brown and Orange Lines, with some of the 2600-series cars being reassigned to the Orange Line to replace them. These cars entered service on the Blue Line on September 17, 2018. During rush hours, the Blue Line additionally borrows two 5000-series trainsets from the Pink Line for short-turn trips between UIC-Halsted and Jefferson Park, although these cars remain officially assigned to the Pink Line and are operated by Pink Line operators. Recently, 7000-series cars have joined the short runs.

== History ==
The Metropolitan's trackage (dark blue) connected with the Loop (black), compared with the modern-day Blue Line (light blue)

The Blue Line is the successor to the Metropolitan West Side Elevated Railroad, which built a series of 'L' lines servicing the West Side of Chicago beginning in 1895. The first section to be built by the Metropolitan extended west in the vicinity of Van Buren Street from an independent terminal at Canal and Jackson Streets to Marshfield Avenue, and then northward in the vicinity of Paulina Street to Damen and Milwaukee Avenues. Service on this section began on May 6, 1895. The structure was completed from Damen Avenue to Logan Square on May 25, 1895.

The next stage in the development of the West Side 'L' came on June 19, 1895, when the Garfield Park Branch was added, extending west in the vicinity of Van Buren Street and Harrison Street from Marshfield Avenue to Cicero Avenue. An extension of service over the tracks of the Aurora, Elgin and Chicago Railroad to a new terminal at Desplaines Avenue was established on March 11, 1905. A subsequent extension to Westchester opened on October 1, 1926, over tracks that had originally been built by the CA&E with the intentions of building a bypass route. (Low ridership would prompt the CTA to discontinue service on the Westchester extension on December 9, 1951.)

Another branch line was added to the rapidly growing Metropolitan on July 29, 1895, when trains began operating over the Humboldt Park Branch, splitting off from the Logan Square Branch at Damen and running west alongside North Avenue to a terminal at Lawndale Avenue. This was followed by still another addition when the Douglas Park Branch was placed in operation as far south as 18th Street on April 28, 1896.

As the southwest area of the city developed, the Douglas Park Branch was extended from 18th Street to Western Avenue in September 1896; to Pulaski Road in June 1902; to Cicero Avenue in December 1907; to Central Avenue in August 1912; to 62nd Avenue in August 1915, and to Oak Park Avenue in Berwyn on March 16, 1924. The Douglas Park branch was later cut back to 54th Avenue in Cicero.

The Metropolitan West Side Elevated began service onto the Loop on October 11, 1897, and a rush period stub terminal at Wells Street was added October 3, 1904. For much of the early 20th century and through the 1940s, service on the West Side Elevated lines went unchanged until 1947, when the Chicago Transit Authority took control of the 'L', initiating a series of massive service cuts and station closings (that would last until the 1980s).

The Metropolitan lines began to be reshaped into the current Blue Line on February 25, 1951, when the CTA opened the Milwaukee-Dearborn Subway, connecting the Logan Square Branch with the Loop on a fast, efficient and more direct routing to downtown, rather than the previous circuitous route that saw these trains entering the Loop at the southwest corner. With opening of the Dearborn Subway, the old elevated alignment between Evergreen Portal and Marshfield Junction was decommissioned, used only for moving out-of-service rail cars. The northern section of the connection between Evergreen Avenue and Lake Street was demolished in the 1960s, leaving the Lake Street to Douglas Branch section—better known as the Paulina Connector—the only section still in operation. The Humboldt Park Branch was cut back to a full-time shuttle between Damen and Lawndale, and discontinued a year later on May 3, 1952.

The Garfield Park elevated was replaced by the Congress line on June 22, 1958, pioneering the world's first use of rail rapid transit and a multi-lane automobile expressway in the same grade-separated right-of-way. (Pacific Electric Railway "Red Car" tracks ran in the median of the Cahuenga Parkway in Los Angeles from 1940 until its expansion into the Hollywood Freeway in 1952, but the Pacific Electric service was an interurban streetcar rather than true rapid transit.) The new line connected with the Milwaukee-Dearborn Subway at the Chicago River and extended westward to Des Plaines Avenue in Forest Park. Loomis Ramp, built at this same time, permitted Douglas trains to be rerouted through the subway as well combining the Logan Square, Garfield Park (now Congress) and Douglas routes into the second through service in Chicago, the Congress/Douglas-Milwaukee Line.

A five-mile (8 km) extension of the route via a short subway connection and the Kennedy Expressway median from Logan Square to Jefferson Park opened on February 1, 1970. It was also built by the City of Chicago using federal money. Just before Logan Square, trains diverted off of the old elevated structure and entered the subway under Milwaukee and Kedzie Avenues to a portal just south of Addison Street, then emerged in the median of the Kennedy Expressway to the temporary terminal at Jefferson Park. The increased ridership that resulted from the extension prompted the CTA to build the second phase of the project, and extend the line the rest of the way to O'Hare. In March 1980, construction began on the O'Hare Airport extension, with the first section between Jefferson Park and River Road opening on February 27, 1983, and the final section to O'Hare on September 3, 1984.

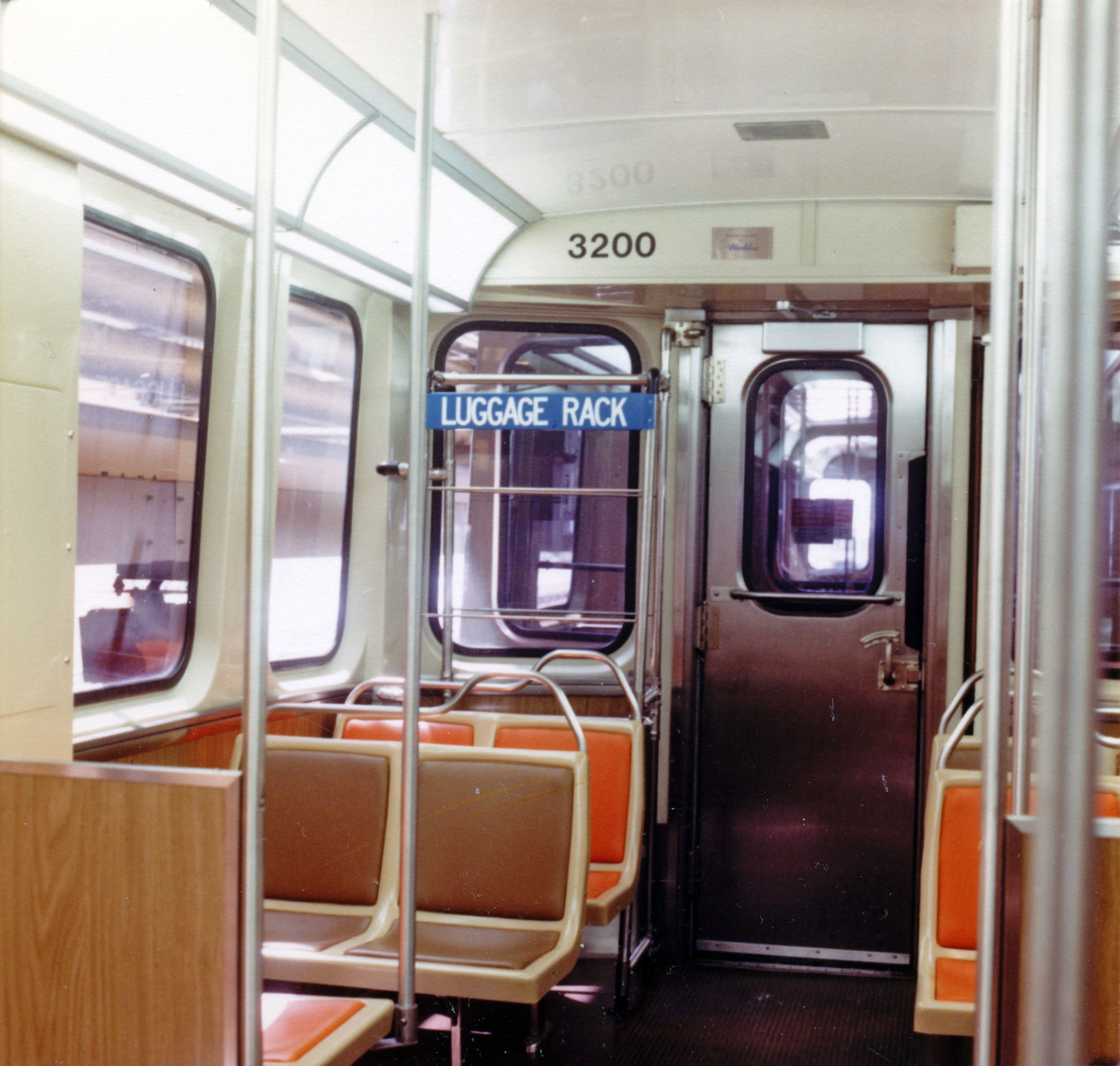
A Blue Line train with luggage racks in the 1980s

On February 21, 1993, the CTA adopted a color-coded naming system to the rapid transit system, and the West-Northwest route (O'Hare-Congress/Douglas) became the Blue Line.

On October 15, 2015, the CTA announced the completed installation of 4G wireless service on the Blue Line in between the Logan Square and Belmont stations. In the future this will mean that the CTA will be the largest rapid transit system with 4G coverage in subway tunnels and stations, this is targeted for the end of 2015.

=== Douglas branch ===
The Douglas branch was once operated as part of the Blue Line. On April 28, 2008, the CTA eliminated Blue Line service on the Douglas branch, having been replaced by the Pink Line. The Loomis ramp that connects the Congress branch to the Douglas branch remains intact for non-revenue equipment moves as the only track connection between the Blue Line and the rest of the system.

On April 26, 1998, the Douglas Branch lost its 24/7 service and began operating between 4 a.m. and 1 a.m. on weekdays only as a result of budget cuts that also eliminated 24/7 service on the Green Line and Purple Line. Congress (Forest Park) service was effectively doubled through much of the day since service frequency from O'Hare required shorter headways than what would have been left.

While the CTA claimed Douglas branch reductions were due to low ridership, community activists also pointed to badly deteriorated infrastructure and funding shortfalls, as well as a perception that the CTA was uninterested in serving the West Side. On September 10, 2001, the CTA began a historic reconstruction of the Douglas Branch to repair its aging stations and tracks. The work was officially completed on January 8, 2005, with new elevated structures, tracks, rebuilt stations, new communication networks and an upgraded power system along the route. On January 1, 2005, weekend service was restored.

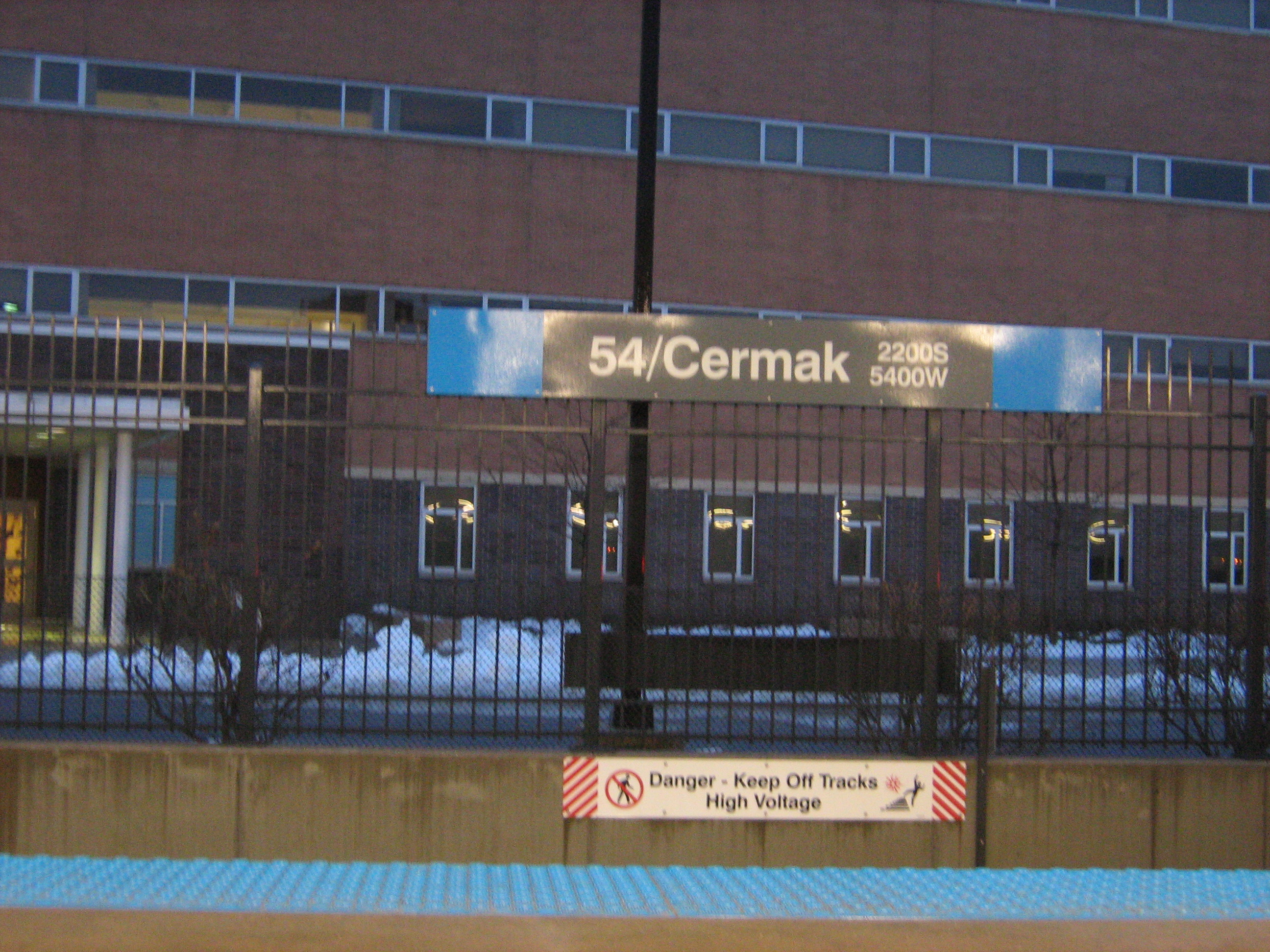
Douglas branch stations like the 54th/Cermak station were once served by the Blue Line.

In January 2005, the CTA held hearings on a proposal to reroute Douglas Branch service via the recently rebuilt Paulina Connector to the Lake Street Green Line, carrying Douglas trains to and around the elevated Loop for the first time since 1958. It was the first stage of what became the Pink Line. This would have allowed a doubling of Blue Line trains to Forest Park on the Congress Branch, since service would no longer be divided between the Forest Park and 54th/Cermak terminals. Due to community fears that the Pink Line would not be enough, however, the CTA decided to retain limited Douglas Branch Blue Line service during weekday rush hours.

On February 15, 2006, the CTA approved the separate operation of the Douglas Branch plan. All non-rush hour trains would all be routed via the Loop, Green Line and Paulina Connector. During rush hour, service was available on the new route as well as the existing route via the Milwaukee-Dearborn Subway. These changes were scheduled to be implemented for a 180-day trial period beginning June 25, 2006, and after their evaluation in early 2007, the Pink Line remained in service.

Beginning April 28, 2008, the CTA began a six-month experimental ceasing of Blue Line operations on the Douglas. Despite maintaining that the service cut was an experiment, the CTA immediately covered Blue Line stations' directional signage for trains to 54th/Cermak with paint rather than temporary covering, suggesting it was a permanent discontinuation instead of a temporary one. All Douglas Branch operations are now served by the Pink Line. On December 4, 2008, CTA announced its decision to permanently discontinue Blue Line service on the Douglas branch and to make the Pink Line permanent.

== Accidents and incidents ==
- On July 11, 2006, a derailment caused a smoky fire in the Blue Line's Milwaukee-Dearborn Subway. There were injuries from smoke inhalation, but no fatalities. The comparatively minor incident prompted heavy news coverage and a temporary stoppage of Chicago subway service because it occurred hours after train bombings in Mumbai earlier the same day.
- On September 30, 2013, two Blue Line trains collided at Harlem (Congress branch), injuring 33 people, after an outbound train was hit by an out-of-service train going the opposite direction on the same track. Earlier, the train had arrived at Forest Park, and went out of service. However, after the train pulled into the Desplaines Yard, it was left on. There were no passengers on the out-of-service train; the number of workers on it at the time of the crash was also an unknown. Also unknown was the total number of passengers on the outbound, in-service train. The investigation started shortly thereafter. Though service soon went back to normal, trains did not stop at the Harlem station until the late evening on Tuesday, October 1, 2013, to avoid interference with the scene and congestion. The NTSB concluded that the probable cause was water in the control cables and insufficient securing of unattended equipment.
- In the early morning hours of March 24, 2014, a Blue Line train derailed at O'Hare at the end of its run. Initial reports said that 32 passengers on the train were injured, but none of the injuries were considered life-threatening. The station reopened on Sunday, March 30, 2014, at 2:00 p.m.
- On April 10, 2019, a Blue Line train derailed in the tunnel near O'Hare station.
- On September 2, 2024, four people were killed in a mass shooting on a Blue Line train as it traveled between the Oak Park and Harlem stations. The gunman was arrested after boarding the Pink Line.
- On November 17, 2025 - 2025 Chicago train attack - Lawrence Reed sets a 26-year-old woman on fire. He is charged with federal terrorism offences.

== Expansion ==
=== Line extensions ===
For years, there has been discussions of extending the O'Hare terminus of the Blue Line westward to Schaumburg, but that has been changed, due to recent developments involving the planning of the Metra STAR Line and various other transportation projects.

However, in 2008, the Regional Transit Authority revealed a plan to the RTA board to expand commuter rail and bus service, which included a 13.3-mile (21.4 km) extension of the Blue Line, from its current western terminus at Forest Park to Yorktown Center in Lombard, Illinois. Several feeder bus services would also be implemented in this plan. The prospect of this extension was also listed in the Chicago region's 2030 master plan.

In 2013, the idea of an infill station at Nagle and Bryn Mawr Avenues was postponed. Such a station remains only idea but may come to fruition in the future because that particular stretch of the line, between Jefferson Park and Harlem, is the second longest on the 'L' system without a station, behind the gap on the Yellow Line between Oakton-Skokie and Howard, although the Yellow Line was designed this way to quickly shuttle passengers to/from the Howard station (the Howard station serves the Red and Purple Lines).

In December 2016, Pace introduced the on-highway BRT I-90 Express service. The successor to the Blue Line Extension and the STAR Line, this service serves as an extension of the Blue Line and provides rapid service along I-90 all the way to Elgin.

=== Extra tracks ===
The surface right-of-way for the Congress Branch, including overcrossings, undergrade bridges and two short tunnels under the expressway, contains space for one extra track between Forest Park and Kenton Avenue and two extra tracks from Kenton to the tunnel portals at UIC-Halsted. It was intended that the interurban Chicago Aurora and Elgin Railroad, which had utilized the Garfield Park Elevated until 1953 to reach its Loop terminal at Wells Street, would use the extra track between Forest Park and Kenton as an express track. However, the CA&E ceased passenger service on July 3, 1957, before track construction had started. The two extra tracks leading to the subway portals were never intended for the CA&E, but would have potentially fed Lake Street "L" trains into a Clinton Street subway that was never built. The CTA also considered plans of its own to add these as express tracks (and service) over the years, as well as a rerouting of the Lake Elevated onto the Paulina Elevated (today's Pink Line) into a new quadrant of the junction with the Douglas Line at Racine, but these plans were discarded for alternative plans and today the system has an entirely separate line in the system, the Pink Line.

=== Stub tunnels ===
The dual portals of the Congress Branch at UIC-Halsted are actually quadruple. Two extra portals exist to the north of the Blue Line portals, which extend only a few dozen feet beyond the portals. These were intended to accommodate a Clinton Street subway that would have created a subway loop, along with the segments on Lake, Dearborn, and Congress. There was never any plan to use them for the CA&E. The loop subway system would have been a partial replacement for the Loop "L", as the City wanted to demolish it at that time. Among those plans were a shuttle trolleybus subway route under Jackson Street to Grant Park (1958, "New Horizons for Chicago Metropolitan Area", CTA).

Between 1968 and 1978, a plan in the form of another subway corridor in the Downtown area was proposed, which was to be routed from UIC-Halsted Station through the north portals, then north under Des Plaines Street to Monroe Street and east under Monroe Street to Grant Park and Millennium Park, where it was to split into two branches: one north to Walton Street serving the North Michigan Avenue area and the other southeast to McCormick Place utilizing Metra Electric right-of-way. Though these portals are still not used, the subway corridor plan under Monroe Street was never officially canceled when the Crosstown and Loop Subway projects were deferred in 1979. It remains to this day an active program.

Between Grand/Milwaukee and Clark/Lake in the Milwaukee-Dearborn Subway, two more stub tunnels exist, continuing west under Lake Street while the in-service tracks turn northwest under Milwaukee Avenue. This junction (actually a stacked junction), built in the 1940s along with the subway, was intended for a never-built connection to, or subway replacement of the Lake Street Elevated. In the late 1960s through the mid-1970s, they were also proposed to be a service link between the Dearborn Subway and a high-speed subway route in Randolph Street to replace a portion of the Lake Street 'L' east of Damen Avenue (Transit Planning Study Chicago Central Area, April 1968).

== Station listing ==
Municipality	Neighborhood	Station	Connections
Chicago	O'Hare	O'Hare	O'Hare International Airport; ATS Airport Transit System
Rosemont		Rosemont	Pace buses: 221, 223, 230, 303, 330, 332, 600, 603, 605, 606, 811
Chicago	O'Hare	Cumberland	CTA bus: 81W; Pace buses: 240, 241, 290, 331; Intercity buses: Greyhound Lines (Minneapolis–Chicago)
Chicago	Norwood Park	Harlem	CTA buses: 88 90; Pace buses: 209, 423
Chicago	Jefferson Park	Jefferson Park	Metra: Union Pacific Northwest; Pace Pulse: ■ Milwaukee Line; CTA buses: 56 68 81 81W 85 85A 88 91 92; Pace buses: 225, 226, 270
Chicago	Irving Park/ Portage Park	Montrose	Metra: Milwaukee District North (at Mayfair); CTA bus: 78
Chicago	Irving Park	Irving Park	Metra: Union Pacific Northwest (at Irving Park); CTA buses: 53 54A 80
Chicago	Irving Park/ Avondale	Addison	CTA bus: 152
Chicago	Avondale/ Logan Square	Belmont	CTA buses: 77 82
Chicago	Logan Square	Logan Square	CTA buses: 56 76 93
Chicago	Logan Square	California	CTA buses: 56 94
Chicago	Logan Square	Western	CTA buses: 49 X49 56 73
Chicago	West Town	Damen	CTA buses: 50 56 72
Chicago	West Town	Division	CTA buses: 9 X9 56 70
Chicago	West Town	Chicago	CTA buses: 56 66
Chicago	West Town	Grand	CTA buses: 8 56 65
Chicago	The Loop	Clark/Lake	Chicago "L": Brown Green Orange Pink Purple; CTA buses: 22 24 134 135 136 156
Chicago	The Loop	Washington	Chicago "L": Red (at Lake); CTA buses: J14 20 22 24 36 56 60 62 124 157
Chicago	The Loop	Monroe	CTA buses: 20 22 24 36 56 60 62 124 151 157
Chicago	The Loop	Jackson	Chicago "L": Red (at Jackson), Brown Pink Purple Orange (at Library); CTA buses: 1 7 22 24 28 36 62 126
Chicago	The Loop	LaSalle	Metra: Rock Island (at LaSalle Street); CTA buses: 24 36
Chicago	Near West Side	Clinton	Metra: BNSF, Heritage Corridor, Milwaukee District North, Milwaukee District West, North Central Service, SouthWest Service (at Union Station); Amtrak long-distance: California Zephyr, Cardinal, City of New Orleans, Empire Builder, Floridian, Lake Shore Limited, Southwest Chief, Texas Eagle (at Union Station); Amtrak intercity: Borealis, Hiawatha, Illinois Service, Michigan Services (at Union Station); CTA buses: 7 37 60 157; Intercity Buses: Barons Bus Lines, FlixBus, Greyhound Lines (at Chicago Bus Station)
Chicago	Near West Side	UIC–Halsted	CTA buses: 7 8 60 126
Chicago	Near West Side	Racine	CTA buses: 7 60 126
Chicago	Near West Side	Illinois Medical District	CTA buses: 7 50 126
Chicago	Near West Side	Western	CTA buses: 7 49 X49
Chicago	East Garfield Park	California	Closed September 2, 1973
Chicago	East Garfield Park	Kedzie–Homan	CTA buses: 7 52 82
Chicago	West Garfield Park	Pulaski	CTA buses: 7 53
Chicago	West Garfield Park	Kostner	Closed September 2, 1973
Chicago	Austin	Cicero	CTA buses: 7 54 57; Pace buses: 305, 316, 392
Chicago	Austin	Central	Closed September 2, 1973; scheduled for reopening by January 2031
Oak Park		Austin	CTA bus: 91; Pace bus: 315
Oak Park		Oak Park	Pace bus: 311
Forest Park		Harlem	Pace bus: 307
Forest Park		Forest Park	Pace buses: 301, 303, 305, 308, 310, 317, 318
