= O'Hare station =

Chicago "L" station

O'Hare
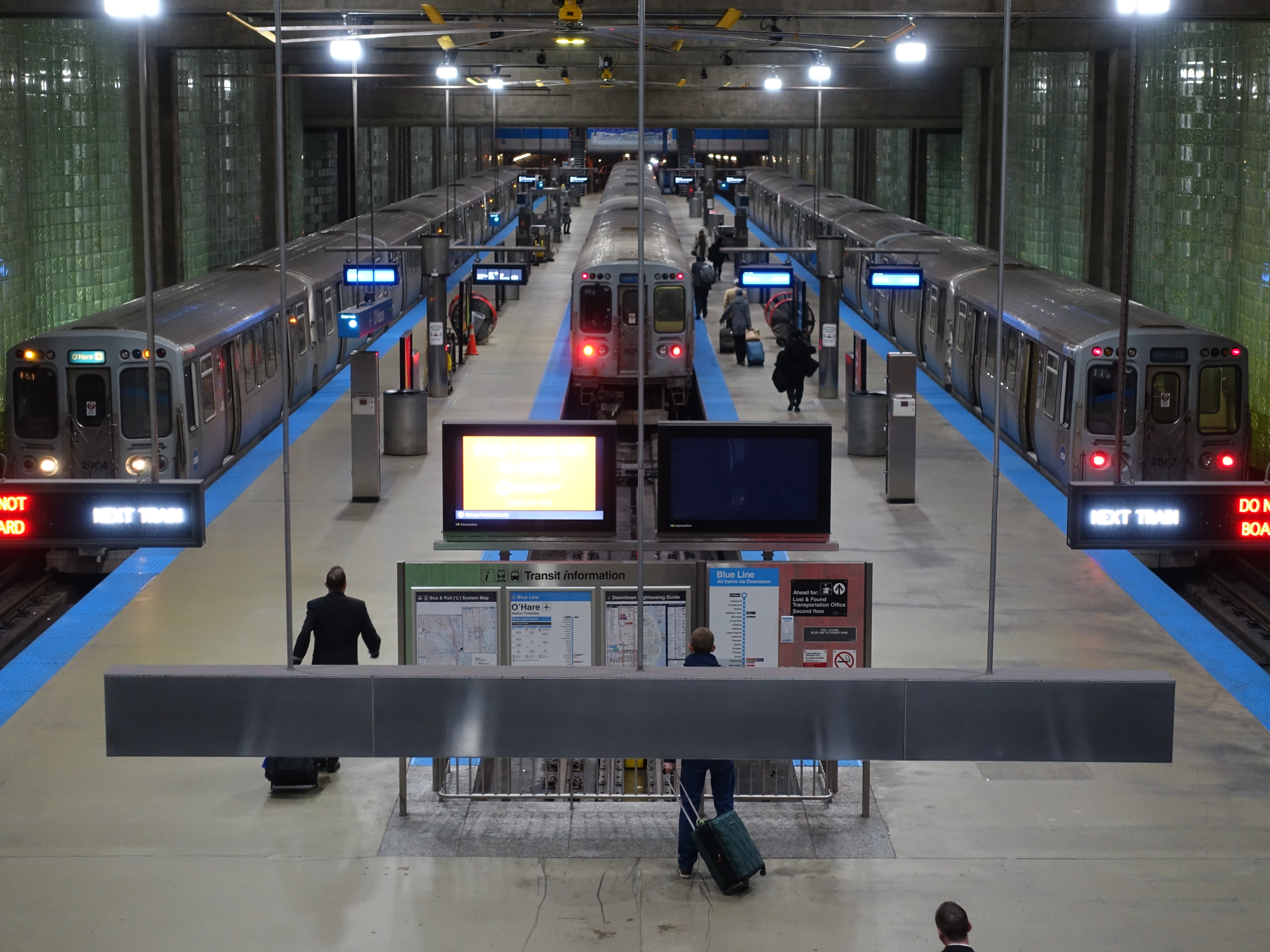
- Three Blue Line trains occupy each track along the bay platform setup.

General information
- Location: 1000 O'Hare Drive; Chicago, Illinois 60666
- Coordinates: 41.981127°N 87.900876°W
- Owner: Chicago Transit Authority
- Line: O'Hare Branch
- Platforms: 1 bay platform
- Tracks: 3
- Connections: Airport Transit System; Pace Buses

Construction
- Structure type: Subway
- Depth: 30 feet (9.1 m)
- Parking: No
- Cycle facilities: Yes
- Accessible: Yes

History
- Opened: September 3, 1984; 41 years ago

Passengers
- 2025: 3,313,419 ▲5.8%

Services
Preceding station	Chicago "L"	Following station
Terminus	Blue Line	Rosemont toward Forest Park
Track layout
Location

O'Hare is a Chicago "L" station located at O'Hare International Airport, 17 miles (27 km) northwest of The Loop. The northwestern terminus of the Chicago Transit Authority's Blue Line, it is a subway station with two island platforms serving three tracks, situated under the parking garage for Terminals 1, 2, and 3. Trains are scheduled to depart from O'Hare every 2–7 minutes during rush-hour periods and take about 40 minutes to travel to the Loop. It is the westernmost station of the Chicago 'L' system. It is also the only station without coordinates in Chicago's grid system, the only underground terminus, and is the only terminal that does not directly connect to any CTA or Pace buses. It serves airport passengers and employees, and is not accessible by foot beyond airport terminals 1, 2, and 3. It is also one of three terminals (the others being Dempster–Skokie on the Yellow Line and Cottage Grove on the Green Line) that does not have a yard assigned to it. Instead, the yard is located at Rosemont, one stop east.

== History ==
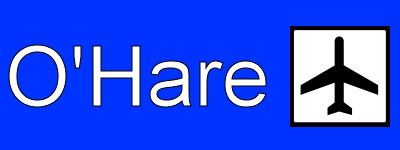
O'Hare destination sign

O'Hare station opened on September 3, 1984, as the terminus of an extension of the West-Northwest route from its former terminal at River Road. It was built to a design by the architectural firm Murphy/Jahn.

=== Introduction of premium fare ===
For the first 28 years of O'Hare station's operations, passengers paid the same fare to enter as they would at any other "L" station. A premium fare was imposed on O'Hare passengers in 2013; first (in January 2013), only passengers buying single-ride tickets had to pay the surcharge; by July of the same year, the surcharge was imposed on most other passengers (those using Ventra or a Ventra Card Plus) as well. Employees working at O'Hare Airport are exempt from the surcharge. O'Hare is the only station on the "L" system with such a surcharge. The system's other station serving an airport, Midway, has no such surcharge, as that station is also a major local bus transfer facility and is accessible by foot from the surrounding neighborhood.

=== Accident ===
On March 24, 2014, a train approaching the station on the middle track collided with the bumper, then jumped the tracks and crashed into the escalators, injuring 32 people. The station reopened on March 30, 2014, at 2:00 p.m.

== Architecture ==
The station was designed by Helmut Jahn of Murphy/Jahn in the distinctive Postmodernism style. The column-free platform is paved with concrete and the walls are constructed of wavy glass block with backlighting. The mezzanine is designed to mimic an airplane fuselage.

== Bus and rail connections ==
Take Airport Transit System to the Multi-Modal Facility (MMF) Stop to access connections

Airport Transit System

- To Terminals 1, 2, 3, 5, and Multi-Modal Facility

Metra

- North Central Service at O’Hare Transfer Station (via the Airport Transit System to Multi-Modal Facility)

Pace

- 250 Dempster Street
- 330 Mannheim/LaGrange Roads
- Pulse Dempster Line
