= Chicago Aurora and Elgin Railroad rolling stock =

Equipment used on a defunct American interurban railroad

The Chicago Aurora and Elgin Railroad (Aurora Elgin and Chicago before 1922) was an electric passenger railroad from Chicago west through its suburbs. The western portions were high-speed heavy lines, but access to the downtown area was on an elevated railway ("the Met"), part of Chicago's "L" system. Because of the electric power and tight loading gauge, the cars were of unusual designs. One other area railroad, the "North Shore Line", also used the "L" to enter Chicago and had similar cars.

== History ==
For most of its operation the A.E.&C./C.A.&E. was short of equipment. On the first day of operation the Niles Car and Manufacturing Company had only delivered six cars of a ten-car order. Within days 15 motor cars and 5 trailers from the John Stephenson Company arrived and service could be increased. In the next 10 years the AE&C bought two cars from Hicks Locomitive & Car Works, five from G. C. Kuhlman Car Company, and six from the Jewett Car Company. The Jewett cars were the last cars bought by the AE&C.

In 1919 the A.E.&C. was forced into bankruptcy. On July 1, 1922 it emerged as the Chicago Aurora and Elgin Railroad and began an improvement program, including new cars.

By 1922 steel body construction had replaced wood, and different manufacturers were in the field. Twenty new cars were bought from the Pullman Company in 1923 and another 15 from the Cincinnati Car Company in 1927. In 1940 10 cars were ordered from the St. Louis Car Company, but they were delayed by WWII and were not delivered until 1945. They would be the last new cars bought by the railroad. In 1937–38 eight secondhand steel cars were bought from the WB&A. Although wood cars were obsolete, the "rush hour" nature of the traffic allowed them to be used until the end of service in 1957, mostly east of Wheaton. Twelve wood cars were leased from the North Shore Line in 1936 then bought in 1945.

After passenger service ended in 1957 passenger cars were stored and maintained at the Wheaton yard, in case service could be resumed. Freight service continued until 1959, with only locomotives 2001 and 2002 in service. The locomotives were stored inside the shop building. In 1961 the railroad was formally abandoned and, except for a few preserved cars, all equipment was scrapped at the Wheaton yard between 1961 and 1963. Useful components were removed, then the cars were burned and the metal left was scrapped.

== Car construction ==
The main lines were built to steam railroad standards, but from Bellwood east the track was built to the much smaller "L" loading gauge. To fit that cars could only be 8 feet 7 inches (2.62 m) wide at the floor, about 55 feet (16.8 m) feet long, and needed radial couplers. Cars had to be built specially and steam railroad type cars could not be used. The North Shore Line, which also used the "L", was one of the very few other railroads built to these standards. The two were able to exchange cars, but the different lines' cars could not be trained without modifications, and were a poor match even after modifications.

Early cars were very ornate, with plush interiors and ornate arched upper sash stained-glass windows. With time and modernization the cars would become plainer and simpler. No steel cars had upper sash windows and they were covered up on wooden cars as they were modernized.

Wood body cars had steel frames, I-beams on cars 10–310 and steel girders in the sides on cars 311–321. In the first 10 years there were problems with the bodies flexing but reinforcing the bodies worked. Most wood body cars continued in service until the end of service in 1957. Spotting features included arched end windows, arched upper sash windows (which were covered up over time during modernization work), and truss rods under the frame, necessary to maintain the body's structural rigidity.

== Running gear ==
Power was 600 VDC through a third rail mounted next to and slightly above the running rail except for sections of street running including the approach to the Elgin and Batavia terminals as well as the Wheaton yard, where trolley poles and overhead wire were used for safety. All motor cars were equipped with trolley poles until the end of service. An overriding pickup shoe was attached to a beam on both sides of both trucks. Early cars were built with four motors each, but a number of cars later had two motors per car removed and made into two-motor cars, or "half motors". All wood cars built new for the railroad originally had General Electric GE 66B 125 hp (93 kW) motors. The last three Jewett cars, fleet numbers 319–321, were modernized around 1923 with new GE 254 140 hp (100 kW) motors. The steel cars from Pullman and Cincinnati used the GE 254 motors as well.

New-bought wood cars numbered 10–209 and 309–310, equipped at Wheaton Shops, had GE C6 controllers. Cars 300–308 and 311–321 were built new with C21 controllers but several were switched to C6 control in the 1950s. Initially all wood motor cars ordered by the railroad were fitted with two complete sets of electro-magnetic contactors, resistors, and reversers, as the most modern contactors available in 1902 had been designed for Manhattan Elevated cars fitted with two GE 66 motors and were incapable of handling current for four motors. Later cars used more modern contactors but retained the dual sets of equipment, but "half motors" only kept one set of control equipment per car. The all-steel cars from Pullman and Cincinnati had GE C165 controllers. The final St. Louis cars had GE 739 motors and GE M-17KC2-19 control. All wood passenger cars could train with each other and all steel passenger cars could train with each other but the two fleets could not be intermixed. Besides differences in control wiring, the wood cars had Van Dorn couplers while the steel cars had incompatible Tomlinson couplers.

== Passenger cars ==
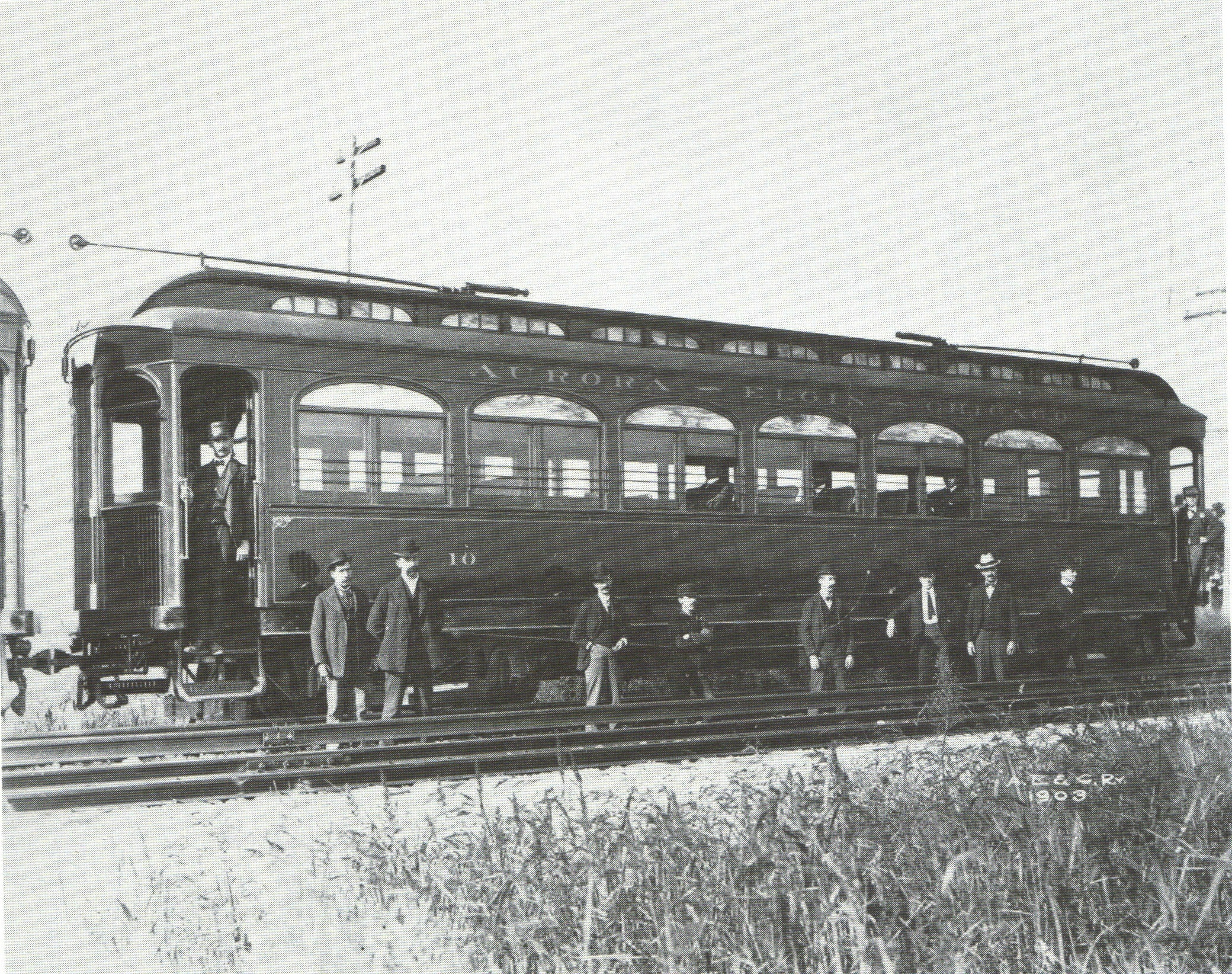
#10 (Niles 1902)

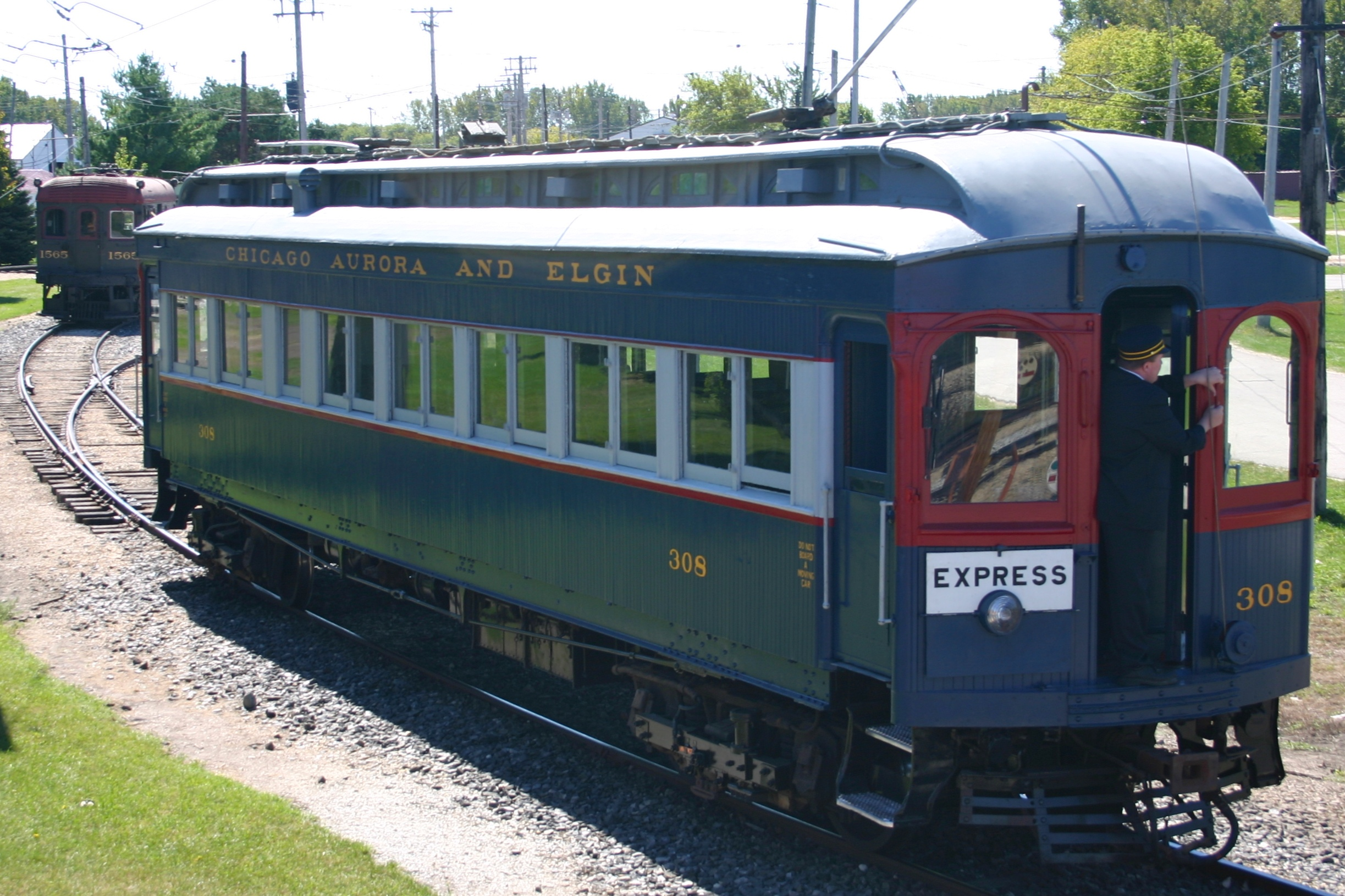
#308 (Niles 1906) Note sash windows covered in rebuild

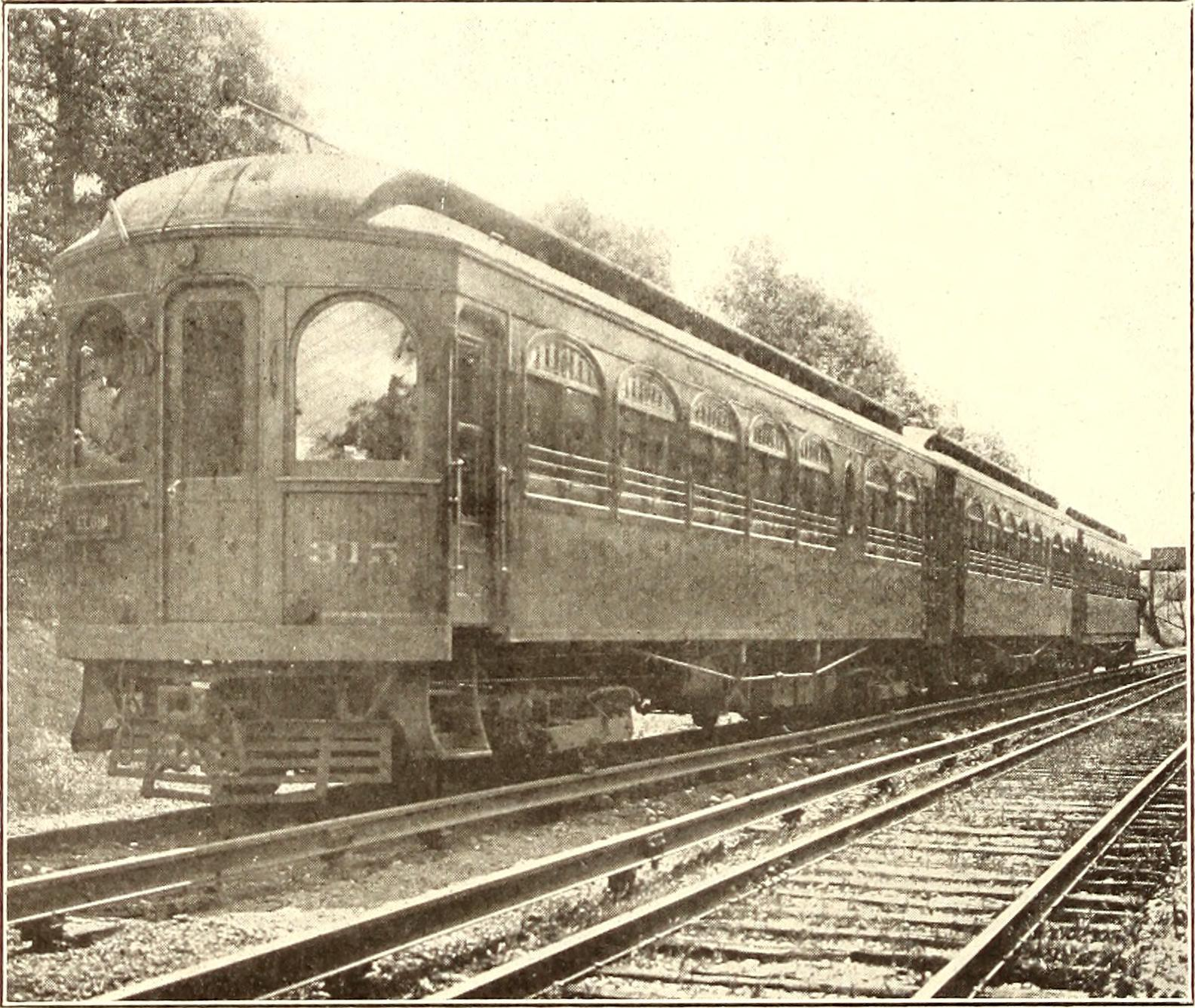
#315 (Kuhlman 1909)

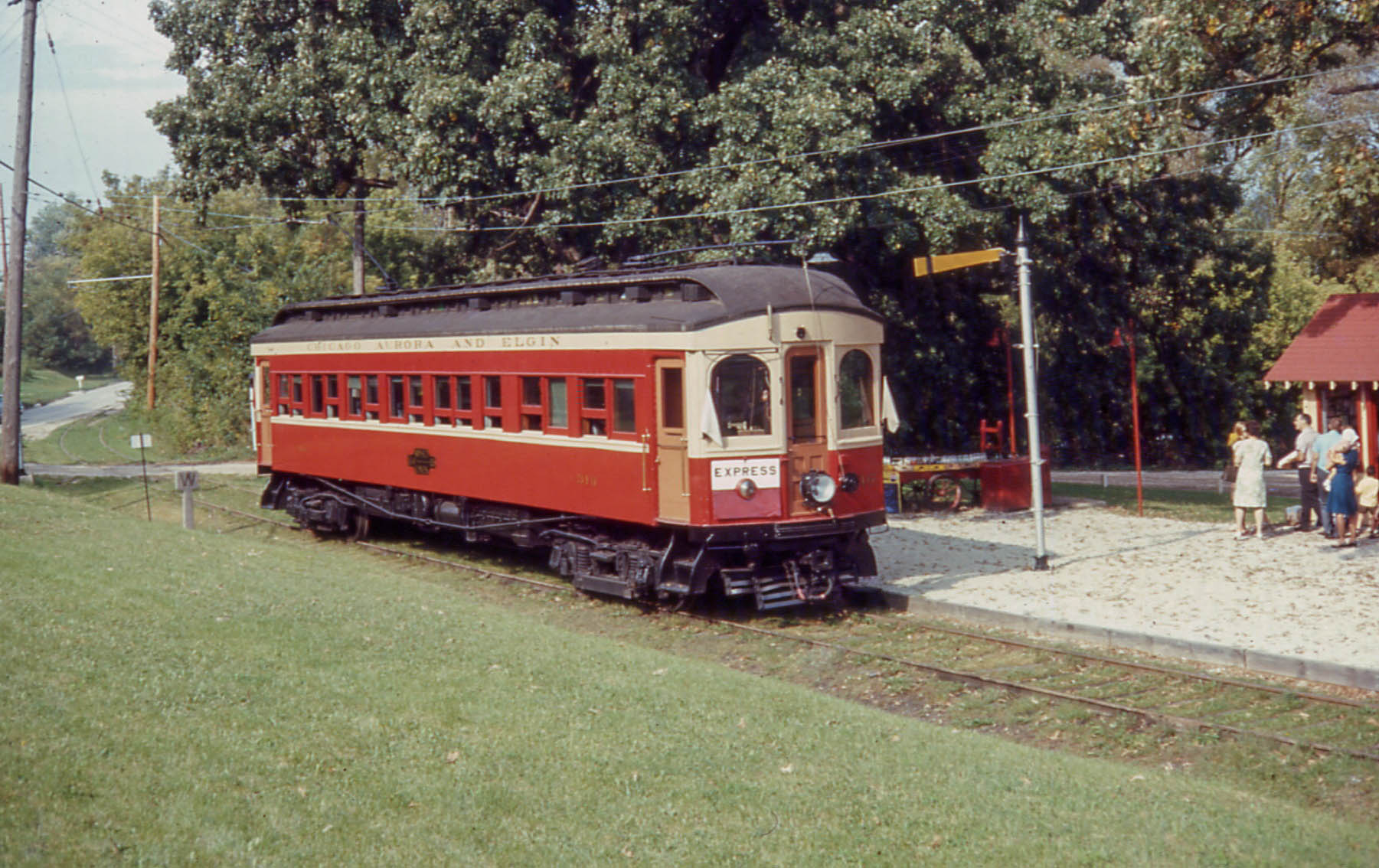
#316 (Jewett 1914) Note sash windows covered in rebuild

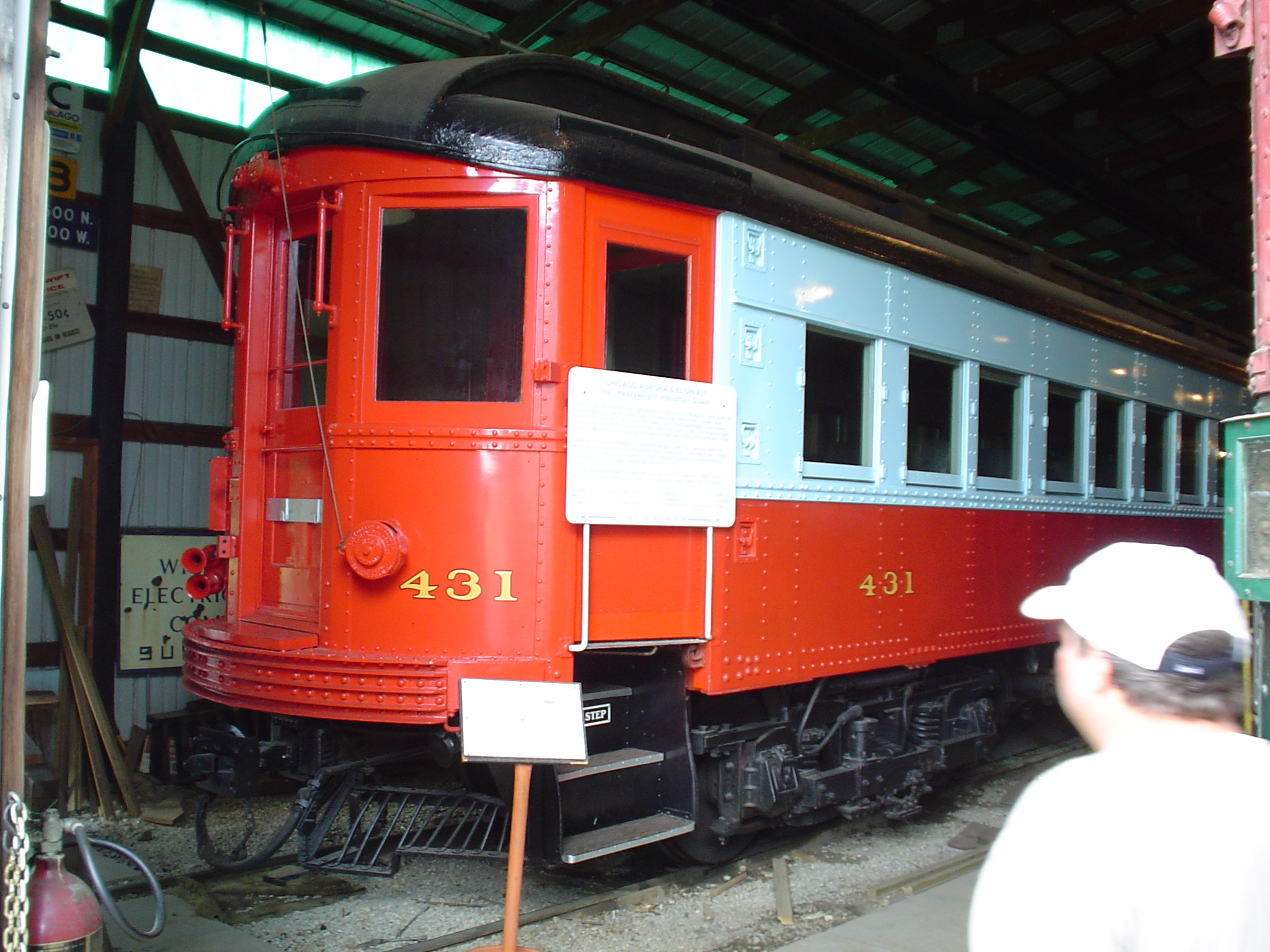
#431 (Cincinnati 1927)

Carolyn and Florence were wood body parlor cars built Niles in 1904 and 1906. Carolyn was a control trailer. Florence had two 125 hp (93 kW) motors. At first special services seemed important, but as business increased and more seats were needed Carolyn was converted to 52 seat coach #209 in 1924. Florence was converted to parlor-buffet car #601, then was rebuilt into 53 seat coach #435 in 1929.

10–28 (even numbers only) were wood body 52 (46 with washroom) seat coaches built by Niles in 1902. The first six cars were ready for the beginning of service in August 1902; four more arrived later in the year. They had four 125 hp (93 kW) motors as built. Car #10 was rebuilt as a funeral car about 1910, then to a coach, then back to a funeral car again. It was wrecked in 1948. Car #22 was wrecked in 1911.

30–58 (even numbers only) were wood body 46 seat coaches built by Stephenson in 1902. They had four 125 hp (93 kW) motors as built. Car #42 was wrecked in 1922.

101–109 (odd numbers only) were wood body 46 seat passenger coach trailers built by Stephenson in 1902. These five cars were part of the same order as the 15 motor cars and their bodies were the same. Car #107 was wrecked in 1914. Car #109 was converted into a funeral car for use with the "L". CA&E cars could not train with "L" cars, so it was converted to "L" controls. It was rebuilt as a flatcar in 1937.

129, 130, 133, 134, 137 were wood body 54 seat coaches built by Jewett in 1907 for the North Shore Line. They were leased in 1936 and bought in 1946.

138–141, 144 were wood body 54 seat coaches built by American in 1910 for the North Shore Line. They were leased in 1936 and bought in 1946.

142–143 were wood body 50 seat coaches built by Jewett in 1909 for the North Shore Line. They were leased in 1936 and bought in 1946.

201–207 (odd numbers only) were wood body 52 seat coaches built by Jewett in 1905. They had four 125 hp (93 kW) motors as built. Car 205 was later converted into a control trailer. All were still in service in 1957.

209 was a wood body 52 seat coach rebuilt in 1924 from parlor car Carolyn.

300–308 were wood body 52 seat coaches built by Niles in 1906. They had four 125 hp (93 kW) motors as built. Parlor car Florence was the 10th car in this order. Car #305 was rebuilt as parlor-buffet car #600, then coach #436 in 1929.

309–310 were wood body 52 seat coaches built in 1907 by Hicks Locomotive & Car Works. Hicks was a small Chicago area builder; these were the only two interurban cars the company built. Both of these cars were in service in 1957. Car 310 was the last car back to Wheaton on the last day of passenger service.

311–315 were wood body 52 seat coaches built by the G. C. Kuhlman Car Company in 1909. Unlike earlier cars with exposed I-beam side sills, these cars had steel girders built into the sides.

316–321 were wood body 52 seat coaches built by Jewett in 1913–1914. These were the last wood body cars bought. #319–321 received new model 140 hp (100 kW) motors, control equipment, and brake equipment around 1922. These three cars were usually assigned together and/or with control trailers.

400–419 were all steel 56 seat coaches built by Pullman in 1923. The first all steel cars bought, they had tapered vestibules, allowing them to be slightly longer than the wood body cars. They had four 140 hp (100 kW) motors.

420–434 were all steel 54 passenger coaches built by the Cincinnati Car Company in 1927. Similar to the Pullmans, they had slightly tapered vestibules, curved front ends, and were slightly longer than wood body cars. They had four 140 hp (100 kW) motors.

435, 436 were wood body coaches rebuilt in 1929 from parlor-buffet cars #600 and #601. They were originally Florence and #305, mechanical sisters built by Niles in 1906.

451–460 were 52–54 passenger coaches built by St. Louis in 1945. They had a noticeable bulge in the body at the belt line, allowing a wider body which could still fit the "L" platforms.

500 was built by St Louis Car in 1927. It was a 4 motor double-ended lightweight Interurban. It only ran for about three years before being stopped with a blown motor It lay out of use until 1942 when it was leased to Chicago North Shore and Milwaukee as 361. It was purchased by the North Shore in 1947 but was scrapped in 1948

600, 601 were wood body parlor-buffet cars rebuilt from Florence and #305, mechanical sisters built by Niles in 1906. Later they were rebuilt as coaches #435, #436.

600–604 were 54 seat coach trailers built by Cincinnati in 1913 for the Washington, Baltimore and Annapolis Electric Railway. They were bought in 1937 after that railway ceased service. Originally motor cars, their motors were removed to make them control trailers. Their bodies were modified with tapered vestibules and curved ends, like the new all-steel cars. After modifications they were used system-wide with other cars.

700–702 were baggage-coach combine trailers built by Cincinnati in 1913 for the WB&A. They were bought in 1938, a year after coaches #600–604, which they were mechanical sisters with. Seats were installed in the baggage compartment, the cars were modified like the #600–604 coaches, then they were used system-wide with other cars.

Numbers	Builder	Year	Seats	Motors	Notes
Carolyn	Niles	1904	28	none	Rebuilt to 209
Florence	Niles	1902	28	2xGE66	Rebuilt to parlor-buffet 601, later 435
10–28 (even)	Niles	1902	46–52	4xGE66	22 wrecked 1919
30–56 (even)	Stephenson	1902	46	4xGE66	42 wrecked 1922
101–109 (odd)	Stephenson	1902	52	none	trailers, 107 wrecked 1914
109	CA&E shops	1906	30	none	Rebuilt to funeral car
129, 130, 133; 134, 137	Jewett	1907	54	4xGE73	Leased from CNS&M in 1936, bought in 1946
138–141, 144	American	1910	54	4xGE73	Leased from CNS&M in 1936, bought in 1946
142–143	Jewett	1909	54	4xGE73	Leased from CNS&M in 1936, bought in 1946
201–207 (odd)	Jewett	1905	52	4xGE66	
209	CA&E shops	1924	52	none	Rebuilt from "Carolyn"
300–308	Niles	1906	52	4xGE66	305 rebuilt as parlor-buffet car 600, later 436
309–310	Hicks Loco	1908	52	4xGE66	
311–315	Kuhlman	1909	52	4xGE66	
316–321	Jewett	1914	52	4xGE66	319–321 4xGE254 motors
400–419	Pullman	1923	56	4xGE254	
420–434	Cincinnati	1927	54	4xGE254	
435	CA&E shops	1929		2xGE66	Rebuilt from parlor-buffet 601
436	CA&E shops	1929		2xGE66	Rebuilt from parlor-buffet 600
451–460	St. Louis	1945	52–54	4xGE739	last cars bought
500	St. Louis	1927	56	4xGE247	In use for about 3 years; to CNS&M 1942
600	CA&E shops	1929		2xGE66	Rebuilt from "Florence", later 436
601	CA&E shops	1929		2xGE66	Rebuilt from 305, later 435
600–604	Cincinnati	1913	54	none	trailers, bought 1937 from WB&A
700–702	Cincinnati	1913		none	trailer combines, bought 1938 from WB&A

== Freight cars and locomotives ==
Built as an electric passenger line in an area with many steam freight railroads, the CA&E had few on-line customers and little bridge traffic. The third rail also was a problem for some steam railroad cars. Even so, freight traffic increased steadily until the 1950s. Express cars operated on the "L", locomotives and freight cars were built to steam railroad standards and could not operate on the "L". Because of an office fire in 1913 little is known about early freight cars.

=== Express cars ===
Express service was passenger sized cars carrying less than carload freight. From 1903 a 2-car newspaper train left Chicago in the early morning and delivered papers to most stops. This train, sometimes using passenger cars, lasted until the end of service. Also in the early morning "milk trains", often an express car pulling a boxcar, made a trip east. These trains picked up milk cans from farms along the line and brought them to a dairy in Chicago, then returned them in the afternoon. This service lost most of its business to trucks and ended in the 1920s. Other express trains ran during the day, and did local switching.

Details of Express Cars AE&C #1 and 2 are unclear but they may have been built by Wheaton in 1902 and 1904. Both had left the roster by 1913. In 1913 the AE&C had 5 express motors and one trailer. American (#5 built 1909), Jewett(#7 built 1906), Niles (#9 built 1907), Brill (#11 built 1910 under order 16483), and McGuire-Cumming (#15 built 1910) each built one, McGuire-Cummings also built the trailer(#67). The first #5 was wrecked in 1920 and replaced by a Cincinnati car built the following year using the same number. All were similar, with 4 GE66 125 hp (93 kW) motors. All had control cabs on both ends and two baggage doors on each side, but had different bodies. Until locomotive 2001 arrived in 1921 most freight traffic was handled with express cars.

5 was still in freight service in the early 1950s, it was scrapped in 1953

7 was rebuilt as a Tool Car in 1941, retirement date unknown

9 was scrapped in 1959

11 was rebuilt as a Line Car in 1947

15 was still in freight service in the early 1950s, it was scrapped in 1953

=== Locomotives ===
3 was a powered snowplow, effectively a steeple-cab locomotive, which was built in the railroad's shops in 1909 It had four GE 66 125 hp (93 kW) motors when passenger cars had two. At first when not plowing it was used in freight service, from 1922 it was used for ballast trains.

2001 was a 44-ton (39,916 kg.) steeple-cab locomotive built by GE (serial 7688) in March 1920 and bought in 1921, sister 2002 ,8067 July 1922, arrived a year later. Originally bought as single locomotives, in 1929 they were modified with multiple unit control and were usually used as a pair. This became common practice of all locomotives, and helped to bridge gaps in the third rail, like at road crossings. They had 4 GE257 175 hp (130 kW) motors. The two remained in service and hauled the railroad's last revenue run on June 19, 1959.

3003, 3004 were 50-ton (45,359 kg.) boxcab locomotives built by Baldwin and bought in 1926. 3003 was built in September 1923 with serial 57070 and 3004 in April 1924 with serial 57717 They originally had 4 Westinghouse WH562 100 hp (75 kW) motors, in 1930 they were upgraded with WH567 170 hp (130 kW) motors. In 1959 they were taken out of service because of cracks in their frames.

4005, 4006 were 72-ton (65,317) boxcab locomotives built by the shops of the Oklahoma Railway as 603 and 604 in 1929. They became Union Electric same numbers in 1946 then Cedar Rapids and Iowa City 72 and 73 in 1948. CA&E bought them in 1955 They had 4 WH562 motors. They were taken out of service because of wheel wear in 1958, only 3 years after they were bought.

=== Freight cars ===
The AE&C owned a number of freight cars, but an office fire in 1913 destroyed most records. In 1924 an CA&E engineering report showed 28 wood gondolas, 10 steel gondolas, 17 wood boxcars, and 16 ballast cars. The table below does not show all cars.

Numbers	Type	Capacity	Notes
280–299	gondola	20 tons (18t)	6 rebuilt as flat cars
21–31 (odd)	flat	20 tons (18t)	rebuilt from 280–299, 23 to AE&FRE
33–39 (odd)	gondola	25 tons (23t)	
43–49 (odd)	flat		second-hand, retired 1910s
53, 55	flat	30 tons (27t)	retired 1948
57, 59	flat	25 tons (23t)	retired 1919–20
61, 63, 65, 69, 71	box		second hand, retired 1914–16
81–89 (odd)	flat		rebuilt from box, retired 1920s
91–99 (odd)	flat	30 tons (27t)	second-hand, retired 1916–30
280–299	gondola	40 ton (36t)	second-hand, retired 1948
501–509 (odd)	gondola	50 ton (45t)	retired 1925–30
501–549 (odd)	gondola	40 ton (36t)	retired 1930
900–915	ballast		bought 1923
1011–1019	reefer		bought 1921, retired 1930

== Preservation ==
- Fox River Trolley Museum in South Elgin, Illinois owns cars 11, 20, 316, 317 and 458.
- Illinois Railway Museum in Union, Illinois owns cars 36, 308, 309, 319, 321, 409, 431, 451, 453, and 460.
- Connecticut Trolley Museum in East Windsor, Connecticut owns car 303.
- Midwest Electric Railway in Mount Pleasant, Iowa owns & operates car 320.
- Rockhill Trolley Museum in Rockhill Furnace, Pennsylvania owns car 315.
- Seashore Trolley Museum in Kennebunkport, Maine owns car 434.
