= Chicago City Railway =

American urban transit company

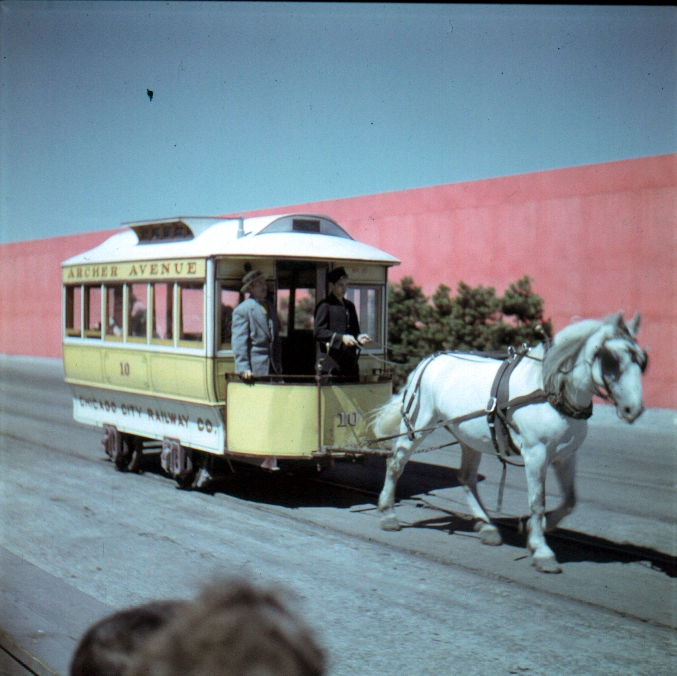
- A horse-drawn Chicago City Railway trolley at the 1949 Chicago Railroad Fair

Overview
- Dates of operation: 1859–1914 (operation); 1950 (liquidation)
- Successor: Chicago Surface Lines (operator); Chicago Transit Authority (owner)

Technical
- Track gauge: 4 ft 8 1/2 in (1,435 mm) standard gauge
- Electrification: 600 V DC Overhead wire (converted 1893-1906)

The Chicago City Railway Company (CCRy) was an urban transit company that operated horse, cable, and electric streetcars on Chicago's South Side between 1859 and 1914, when it became merged into and part of the Chicago Surface Lines (CSL) metropolitan-wide system. After that time it owned electric streetcars, along with gasoline, diesel, and propane – fueled transit busses. Purchased by the government agency Chicago Transit Authority (CTA) in 1947, it was liquidated in 1950.

== Beginnings (C.C.Ry.) ==
In the 1850s, Chicago was growing and better public transportation was needed. Horse-drawn omnibuses were shuttling passengers between several recently built interstate railroad stations for radiating lines like spokes of a wheel by 1853, but city/town streets, roads and turnpikes were often muddy, rutted and potholed with travel very difficult. In 1858, omnibus operator Frank Parmelee and a group of investors were awarded a city franchise for a rail horsecar line, but legal challenges caused them to seek a state charter instead. On February 14, 1859, the Chicago City Railway Company (C.C.Ry.) was incorporated and in two months horsecars were running on State Street between Randolph and 12th Streets.

== Horsecars ==
The horsecars were a success from the start. The smooth rail and reduced rolling resistance allowed larger cars to be used in all weather. A typical car was 18 ft (5.49 m) long, 7 ft (2.13 m) wide, and could carry 20 passengers.

Although horsecar lines were inexpensive to build, they were expensive to operate. Horses could be up to 2/3 of the value of a company. They were expensive to buy, needed people to maintain them, were subject to illness, and made a huge amount of manure/waste. By 1880, the C.C.Ry. was looking for a better, mechanical replacement.

== Cable cars ==
In 1880, superintendent Charles Holmes visited San Francisco to see the new and successful cable car lines there, and could see a use for cable cars in Chicago. As with most cities which would use cable cars, the problem in flat-landed Chicago was not one of grades and steep hills and valleys, but of pure transportation capacity.

Construction began in 1881 on a system designed by William Eppelsheimer, with lines going south from the downtown area on main thoroughfare State Street and Wabash-Cottage Grove Avenues. This system was to become the largest and most profitable cable car system in the world.

State Street service started on January 28, 1882, Cottage Grove Avenue on February 26. Counter to some people's expectations, the cable cars did not suffer much from the elements, and the harsher Chicago climate with extreme variations in summer heat and winter cold was no problem for them.

The number of passengers caused a different approach to the cars than the San Francisco cable car system. Rather than using a grip car and single trailer, or combining the grip and trailer into a single car, like the "California Cars", CCRy used short bi-directional grip cars to pull trains of up to three trailers.

The cable cars did not completely replace the horsecars, but they rather created a transportation backbone. In fact, even as the horse lines were being converted to trolleys, the electrical cars from some feeder lines had to be pulled by grip cars through the downtown area, due to the lack of trolley wires there.

== Electric streetcars ==
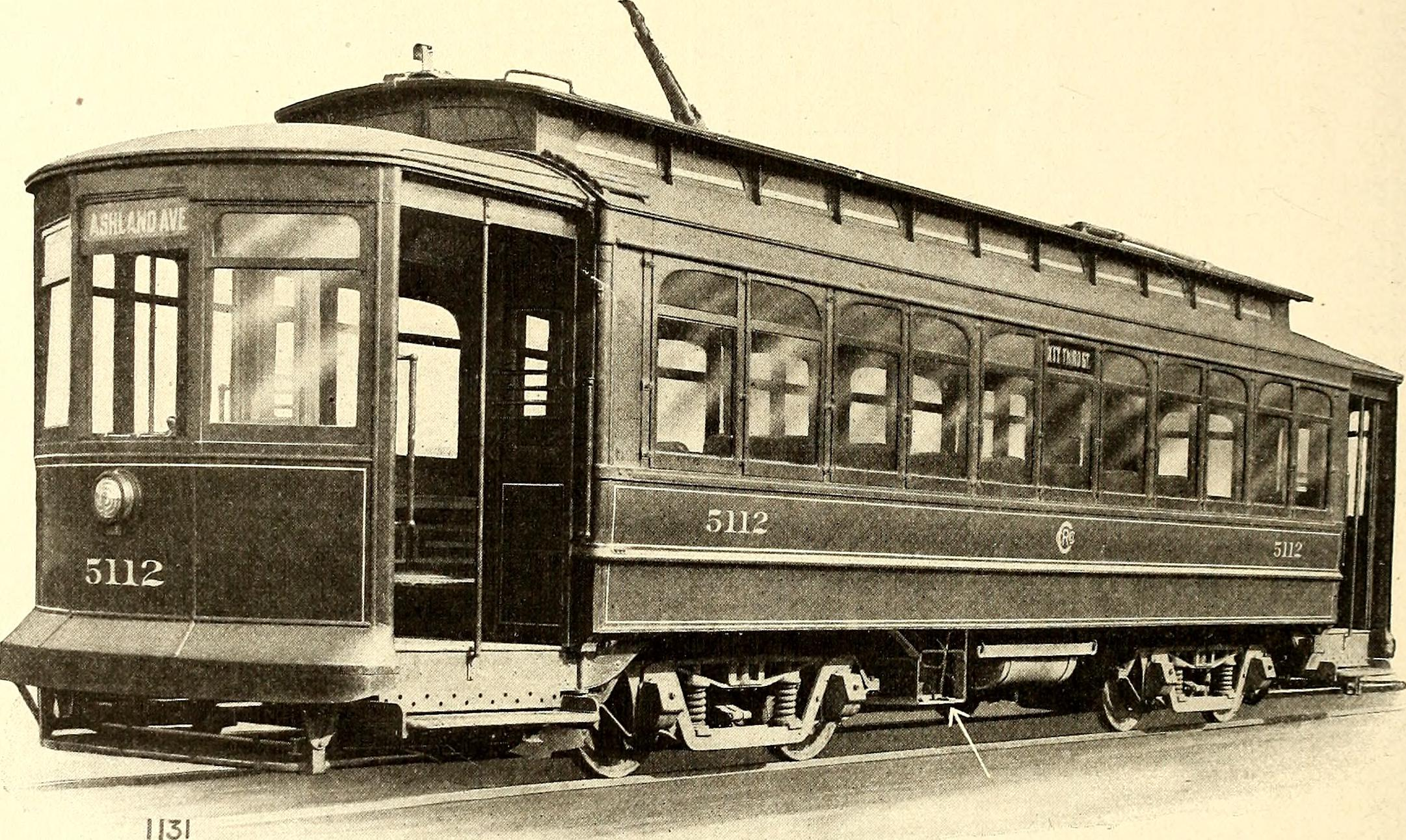
Electric streetcar of the Chicago City Railway Company

As the cable system was being built electric traction was being developed. Although the individual cars cost more, stringing wire cost far less per mile than digging conduits. In 1892, the Chicago City Council allowed C.C.Ry.'s first electric lines. Since the cable lines were already effective, and there was opposition to wires downtown, electric cars were used to replace horsecars on feeder routes when they became available. It was not until 1906, that all CCRy lines were converted to electricity. From then on, the CCRy primarily operated electric streetcars.

== Chicago Surface Lines (C.S.L.) ==
By 1900, political corruption, unscrupulous actions by other companies, and public opinion made it difficult for the street railways to plan ahead. Length and terms of franchises, fare caps, taxes, and property owner consent were some of the problems.

Public ownership was discussed, but instead, city ordinances controlling the private companies were passed and appealed for years. One was the Unification Ordinance of November 13, 1913 by the Chicago City Council, which combined management and operations of all Chicago streetcar companies as the Chicago Surface Lines (C.S.L.), taking effect in 1914. The C.C.Ry. became a "paper company". It continued to own equipment, but the equipment was operated by the C.S.L. and used systemwide throughout the metropolitan area.

The CSL was eventually sold to the publicly owned, government agency, Chicago Transit Authority after 88 years of private operations and 34 years since consolidation, on April 22, 1947, and the CCRy was liquidated on February 15, 1950.

== Remnants ==
In 2015 yard switcher CSL #L202 and flat car CTA #314 are at the Fox River Trolley Museum in South Elgin, Illinois. CCRy #209 cable trailer and CSL #9020 electric trailer are at the Illinois Railway Museum in Union, Illinois. Horsecar #10 and grip car #532 were on exhibit in Chicago's Museum of Science and Industry in 1979.

One CCRy streetcar station from 1893 survives at 5529 South Lake Park Avenue in Chicago's Hyde Park neighborhood. The former cable car station and waiting room currently serves as the home of the Hyde Park Historical Society.

A shop building from 1902 and streetcar barns from 1906, still remained in service As of 2014 at the CTA's 77th Street and Vincennes Avenue yards. Another streetcar barn remained on Wabash Avenue just north of 63rd Street. It was torn down between June 2016-2017.
