= Chicago Aurora and Elgin Railroad =

Defunct American interurban railroad

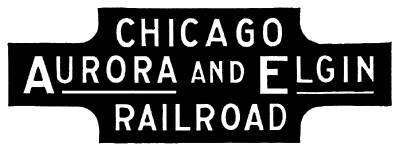

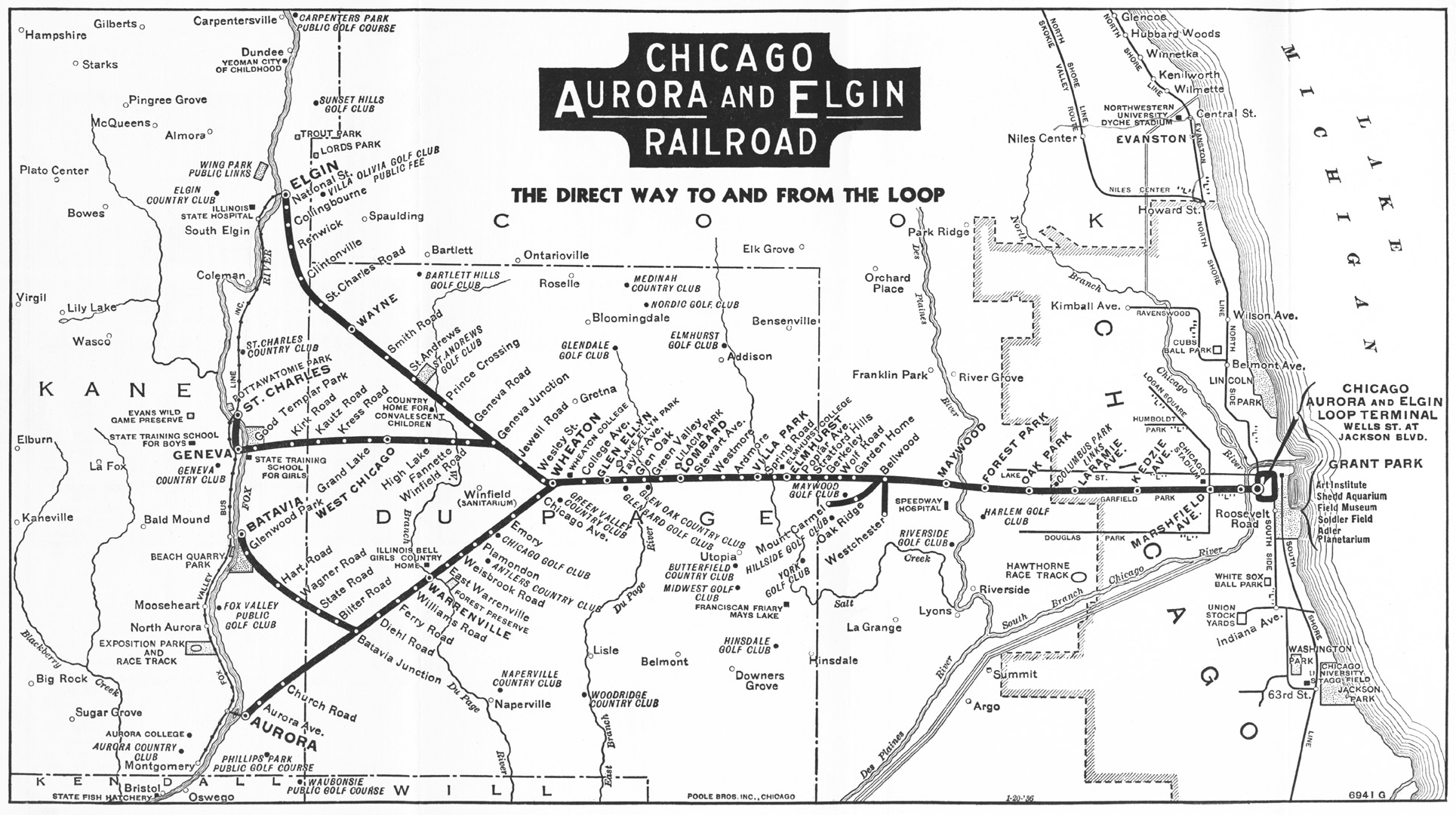
- Map of the Chicago Aurora and Elgin Railroad from a 1936 public timetable folder

Overview
- Headquarters: Wheaton, Illinois
- Locale: Chicago, Illinois and western suburbs
- Dates of operation: 1902–1959

Technical
- Track gauge: 4 ft 8 1/2 in (1,435 mm) standard gauge

The Chicago Aurora and Elgin Railroad (CA&E), known colloquially as the "Roarin' Elgin" or the "Great Third Rail", was an interurban railroad that operated passenger and freight service on its line between Chicago and Aurora, Batavia, Geneva, St. Charles, and Elgin, Illinois. The railroad also operated a small branch to Mt. Carmel Cemetery in Hillside and owned a branch line to Westchester.

Wounded by the increased use of automobiles after World War II, the CA&E abruptly ended passenger service in 1957. Freight service was suspended in 1959, and the railroad was officially abandoned in 1961. Most of the right-of-way has since been converted to the Illinois Prairie Path rail trail.

== The Aurora Elgin and Chicago Railway ==
=== Origin (1899–1901) ===
The first known attempt to create an electric railway between the metropolis of Chicago and the Fox Valley settlement of Aurora was in late 1891. By this time, passengers in Aurora and Elgin were served by steam railways. Elgin was served by the Milwaukee Road, Geneva and West Chicago served by the Chicago and North Western Railway, St. Charles served by the Chicago Great Western, and Aurora was served by the Chicago, Burlington and Quincy (CB&Q). However, it was thought that an electric line would greatly facilitate interurban travel, as there would be no freight trains to slow passenger trains. A group of investors founded the Chicago & Aurora Interurban Railway with a $1 million investment. However, the railroad was unable to secure additional funds; it failed to meet an 1893 construction deadline and effectively ceased operation thereafter. A second attempt came two years later with the Chicago, Elgin & Aurora Electric Railway. Plans called for the railroad to run through Turner (now West Chicago), Wheaton, and Glen Ellyn. Like its predecessor, the railroad failed to acquire the necessary funds for construction. Yet another group incorporated the DuPage Interurban Electric Railway in 1897, but was met with a similar fate. Small electric lines opened in the 1890s that connected the municipalities of the Fox River Valley. A profitable streetcar railway stretched from Aurora north to Carpentersville. The success of this railway inspired investors to again attempt an electric connection to Chicago. A group led by F. Mahler, E. W. Moore, Henry A. Everett, Edward Dickinson, and Elmer Barrett formed independent railway lines that were projected to stretch from Aurora and Elgin to Chicago. These two companies were incorporated on February 24, 1899. The Everett-Moore group was Ohio's largest interurban railroad company and had experience administrating several lines around Cleveland, most notably the Lake Shore Electric Railway. These two companies, the Aurora, Wheaton & Chicago Railway and Elgin & Chicago Railway, were incorporated on February 24, 1899.

Only one day after their founding, a second group of Cleveland-based investors, led by the Pomeroy-Mandelbaum group, incorporated the Aurora, Wheaton, & Chicago Railroad Company. Pomeroy-Mandelbaum was the second largest interurban railway company in Ohio and intended to compete against the Everett-Moore group. A meeting between the Everett-Moore syndicate and Pomeroy-Mandelbaum group occurred in either 1900 or 1901 to discuss the future of the two companies. They came to an agreement: Everett-Moore would build and maintain the railways connecting Aurora to Chicago while the Pomeroy-Mandelbaum group would control railways linking cities in the Fox River Valley (eventually consolidating as the Aurora, Elgin and Fox River Electric Company [AE&FRE]). A third railway, the Batavia & Eastern Railway Company, was incorporated by the Everett-Moore group in 1901 to link the town of Batavia to the Aurora line. On March 12, 1901, all of the previously incorporated Everett-Moore companies were merged into one, renamed the Aurora, Elgin & Chicago Railway Company (AE&C). Three million dollars' worth of bonds were issued in 1901 to support track construction.

=== Construction (1901–1902) ===
Construction commenced on September 18, 1900, when the AE&C started to grade its right-of-way. The AE&C received permission to cross existing track lines in February 1902, alleviating one of the largest obstacles in the railway's construction. Construction escalated following the winter months; by April, the third rail had been completed between Aurora and Wheaton. Later that month, the railway connected to the Metropolitan West Side Elevated Railroad at 52nd Avenue (modern day Laramie Avenue) in Chicago. The company operated steam locomotives on completed portions to deliver construction goods to where they were needed. Wheaton was selected as the site of the railroad's headquarters, car barn, and machine shop. $1.5 million in preferred stock was issued in April 1902 to cover unexpected costs.

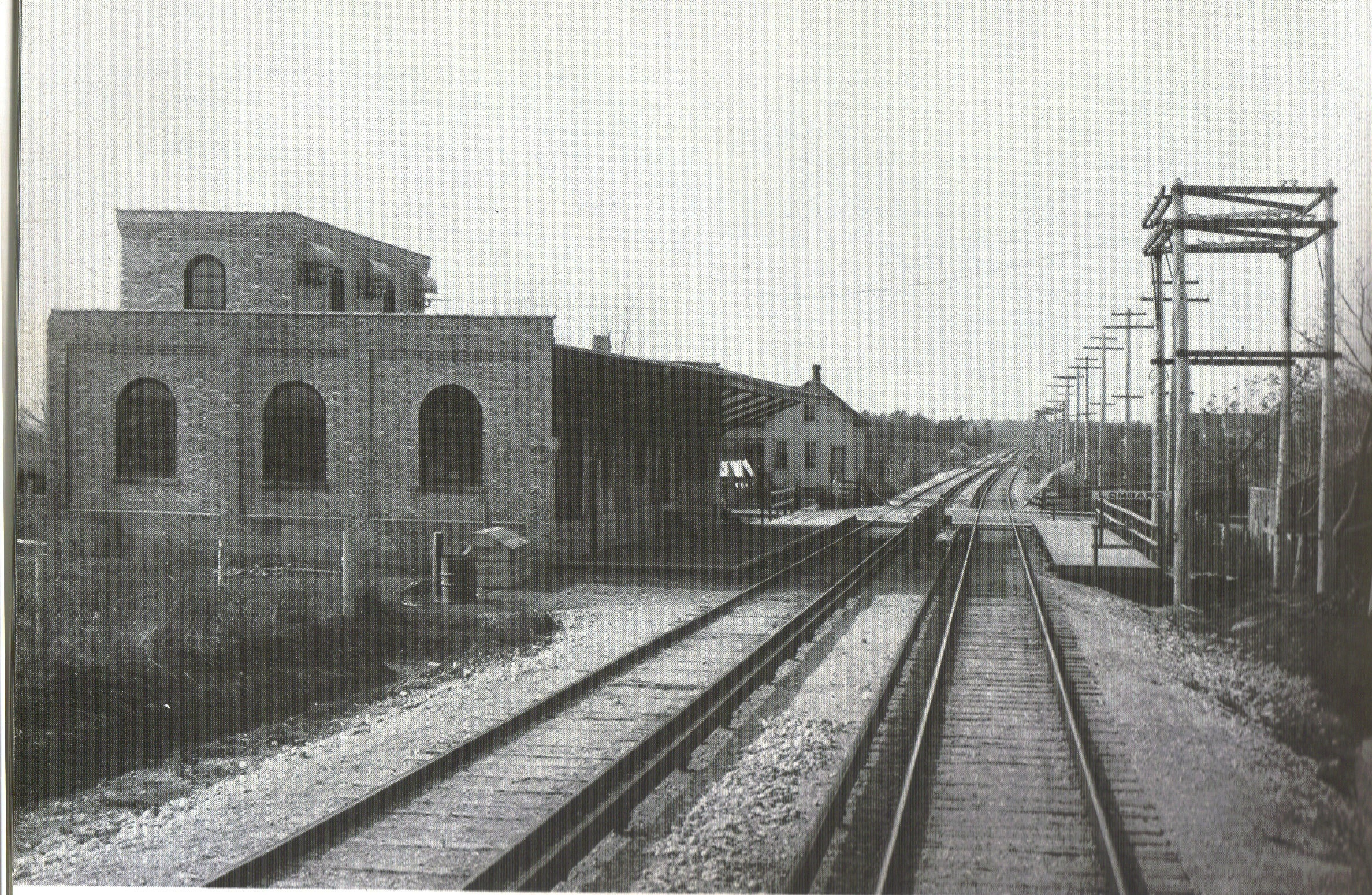
The AE&C station at Lombard (left), pictured in 1902. The station doubled as an electrical substation.

AE&C purchased a 28-acre (11 ha) lot south of Batavia and constructed a power station to provide electricity. Commercial electric power was not yet available at the time, so the railroad needed to provide its own power for the third rail. Steam boilers were fed with coal provided by the Chicago, Burlington & Quincy Railroad. On April 11, 1902, they signed a contract with General Electric to provide electrical generators, transformers, and converters for the powerhouse. The line completed a network of utility poles through the right-of-way, allowing communication and power exchange between electrical substations along the track in Aurora, Warrenville, and Lombard. A fifth station was built southeast of Wayne for the Elgin branch. The substations converted the alternating current in the power lines to a lower-voltage direct current for use in the third rail. After its completion, the power station also provided power for at least three small trolley lines and several Fox Valley communities.

The Cleveland Construction Company was hired to build the line. All three rails were traditional "T" design rails laid on stone ballast. Wooden railroad ties were laid 2,816 ties to the mile and separated at standard gauge. Every fifth tie was 9 feet (2.7 m) long to support the third rail. The majority of the line was a double track, with a single track running from the Chicago Golf Club to Aurora. Roadbeds for the double track were 30 feet (9.1 m) wide and were surrounded by woven wire fencing. The third rail was usually placed on the inner sides of the double track, providing safety for residents and employees. The third rail was interrupted at railroad crossings, where a cable was placed underground to carry the current across the 75-foot (23 m) gap.

The first inspection trip of the 34.5-mile (55.5 km) line was held on May 16, 1902. the train departed from 52nd Avenue to Aurora, then traversed the AE&FRE south to Yorkville then north to Dundee. AE&C management announced later that evening that they planned on opening the line on July 1. The AE&FRE announced soon afterward that it would offer express transfer service from Fox Valley communities to the AE&C. On May 17, the AE&C tested the powerhouse in Batavia and found several problems with its performance. Heavy rains in June stalled construction and washed out some completed roadbed. The opening date was pushed to July 12, but delays in rolling stock production further stalled it to August.

Poor investments forced the Everett-Moore syndicate to sell its shares in the AE&C in mid-1902. The company had formed a telephone company, but struggled to compete with the Bell Telephone Company. In addition, one of their construction companies went bankrupt, spurring a credit crisis in Cleveland. Creditors demanded pay, and the Everett-Moore group sold off several assets, including their shares of the railroad company totaling $200,000. The Pomeroy-Mandelbaum group still held a large share in the company and became leaders in its operation.

The G. C. Kuhlman Car Company was tasked with providing thirty passenger cars but, for unknown reasons, the deal fell through. An order was placed with the Niles Car and Manufacturing Company in March 1902 for ten cars. Niles Cars were in such high demand that the company was unable to fulfill the full order, but did deliver the AE&C's first six cars on July 29, 1902. The cars were 74,325 pounds (33,713 kg) with four 125 horsepower (93 kW) motors and 36-inch (910 mm) wheels. They were described as "miniature Pullmans" and could seat forty-six or fifty-two passengers. Another twenty cars were ordered from the John Stephenson Car Company and would arrive after the railway was opened.

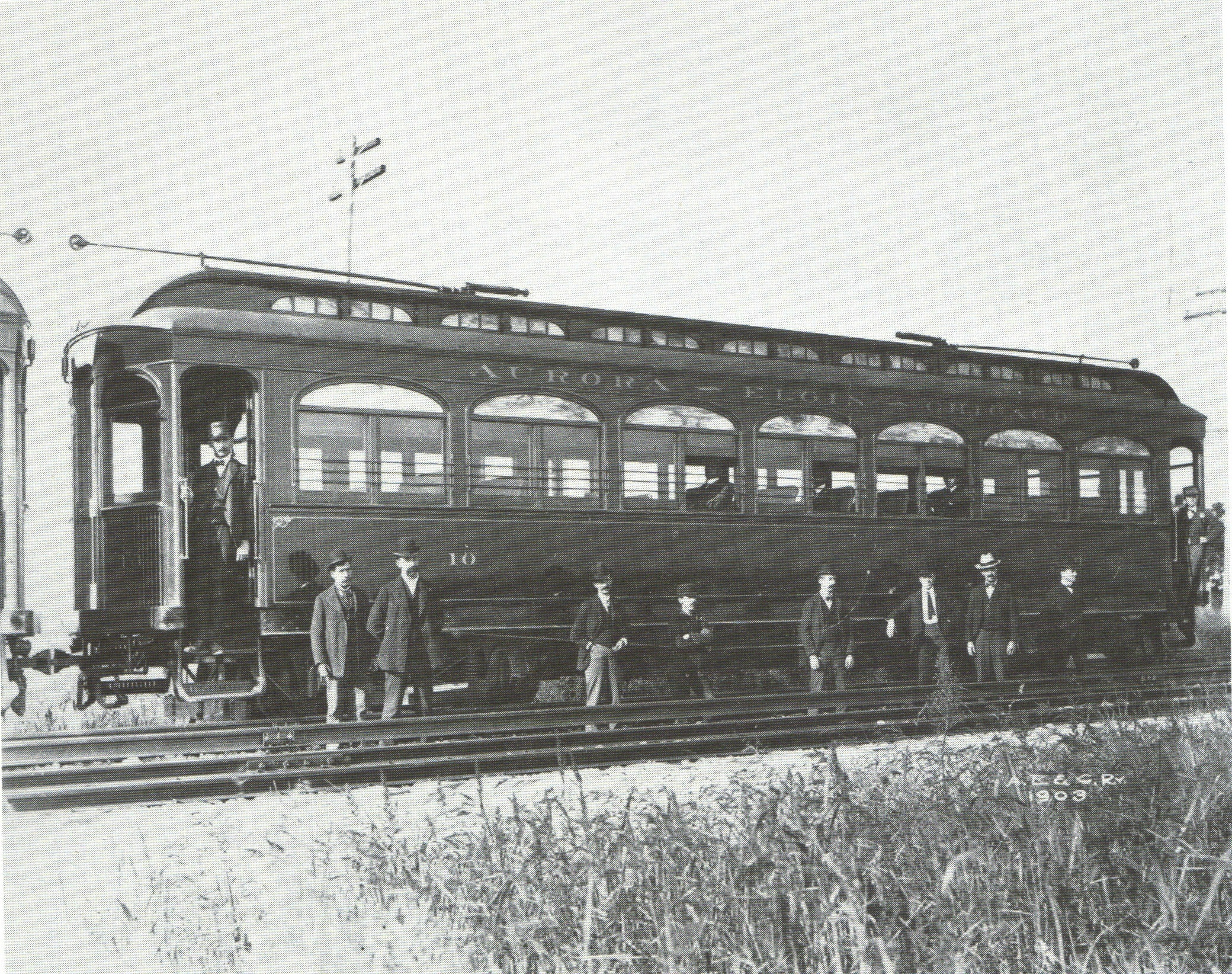
Car 10 during an inspection on August 4, 1902. The first ten cars were assigned even numbers from 10 to 28.

One final problem for the AE&C was finding enough qualified motormen to run the trains. The company found none in the immediate area and had to recruit sixteen men from Dayton, Ohio. Another inspection tour occurred on August 4, from Wheaton to 52nd Avenue. A Niles Car was pulled by a steam locomotive along the track to ensure that none of the curves were too sharp for the intended rolling stock. Original plans called for the third rail to guide the car, but the company experienced many electrical problems along its power lines. By the time the third rail was functioning properly, two hundred and fifty utility poles had burned to the ground due to faulty insulators. A final inspection took place on August 21 from Wheaton to Elmhurst. Although problems with the utility poles were noted, the inspection was otherwise considered a success. For the next three days, engineers tested the line from Aurora to Wheaton so that they would have a familiarity with the track.

=== Early service ===
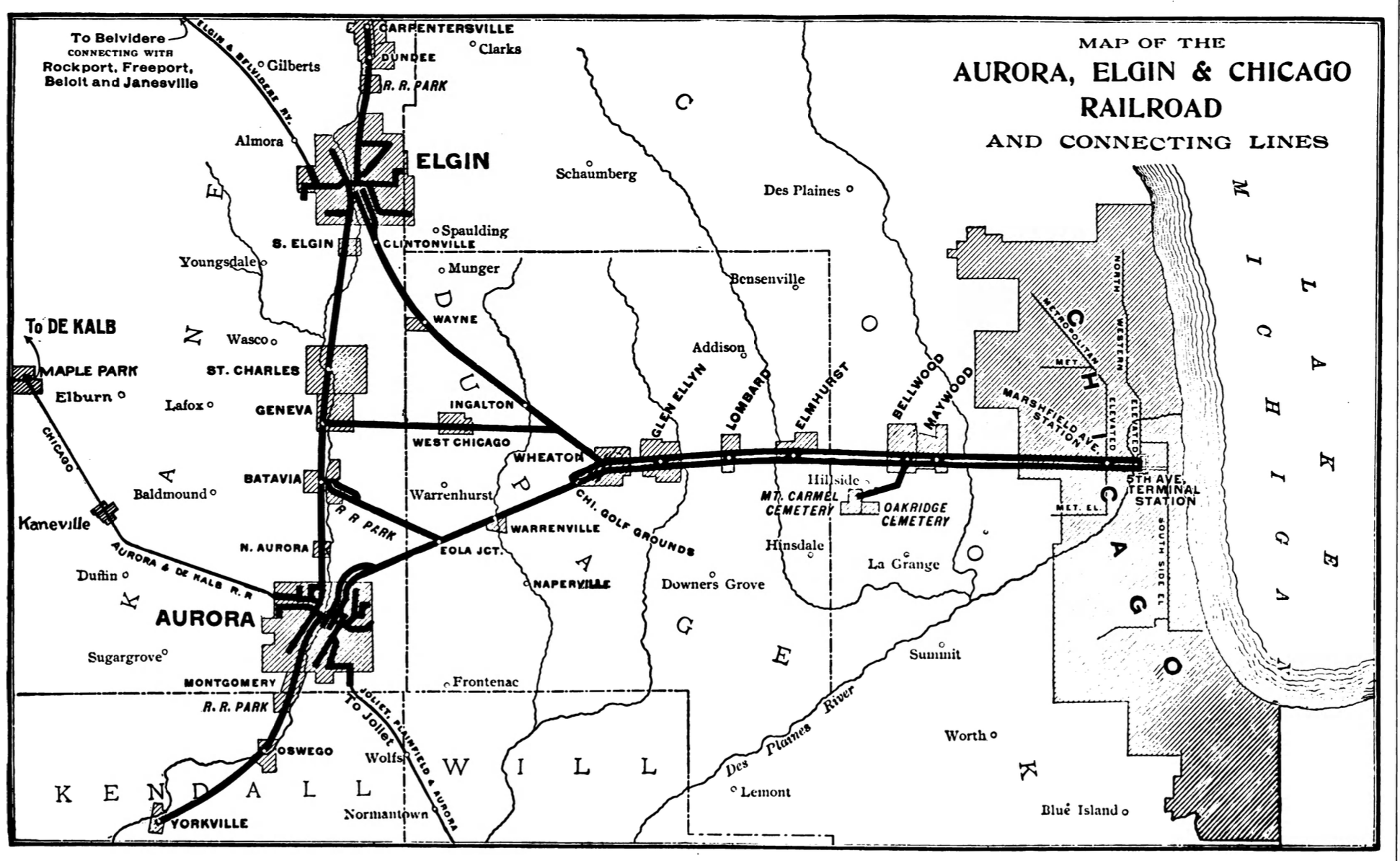
Map of the Aurora Elgin and Chicago RR c 1912

Despite a malfunctioning power system, a group of nearly-untrained motormen, and only six pieces of operational rolling stock, the Aurora branch of the Chicago Aurora and Elgin Railroad opened on August 25, 1902. Fares were 25 cents one-way and 45 cents round-trip. Passengers who wanted to enter The Loop had to transfer to the Metropolitan West Side Elevated at 52nd Avenue for an additional five cents. Service began at 5:33 am and concluded at 11:33 pm, with trains running every thirty minutes. Terminals were opened to the public at 52nd Avenue, Austin Avenue (in Chicago), Oak Park, Harlem Avenue (in Forest Park), Maywood, Bellwood, Wolf Road (in Hillside), South Elmhurst, Secker Road (in Villa Park), Lombard, Glen Ellyn, College Avenue (in Wheaton), Wheaton, Gary Road (in Wheaton), Chicago Golf Grounds, Warrenville, Ferry Road (in Warrenville), Eola Junction (in Aurora), and Aurora. A one-way trip from Aurora to Chicago was seventy-five minutes. The final four cars from the Niles Car Company arrived on September 5 and were put into service seven days later. The original train schedules posted at stations showed service on the Batavia branch. However, actual service did not begin until the last week of September 1902. The Batavia branch met the Aurora branch at Eola Junction. Even when opened, the Batavia branch experienced little traffic and may have been primarily used as convenient transport for railroad officials to the Batavia powerhouse.

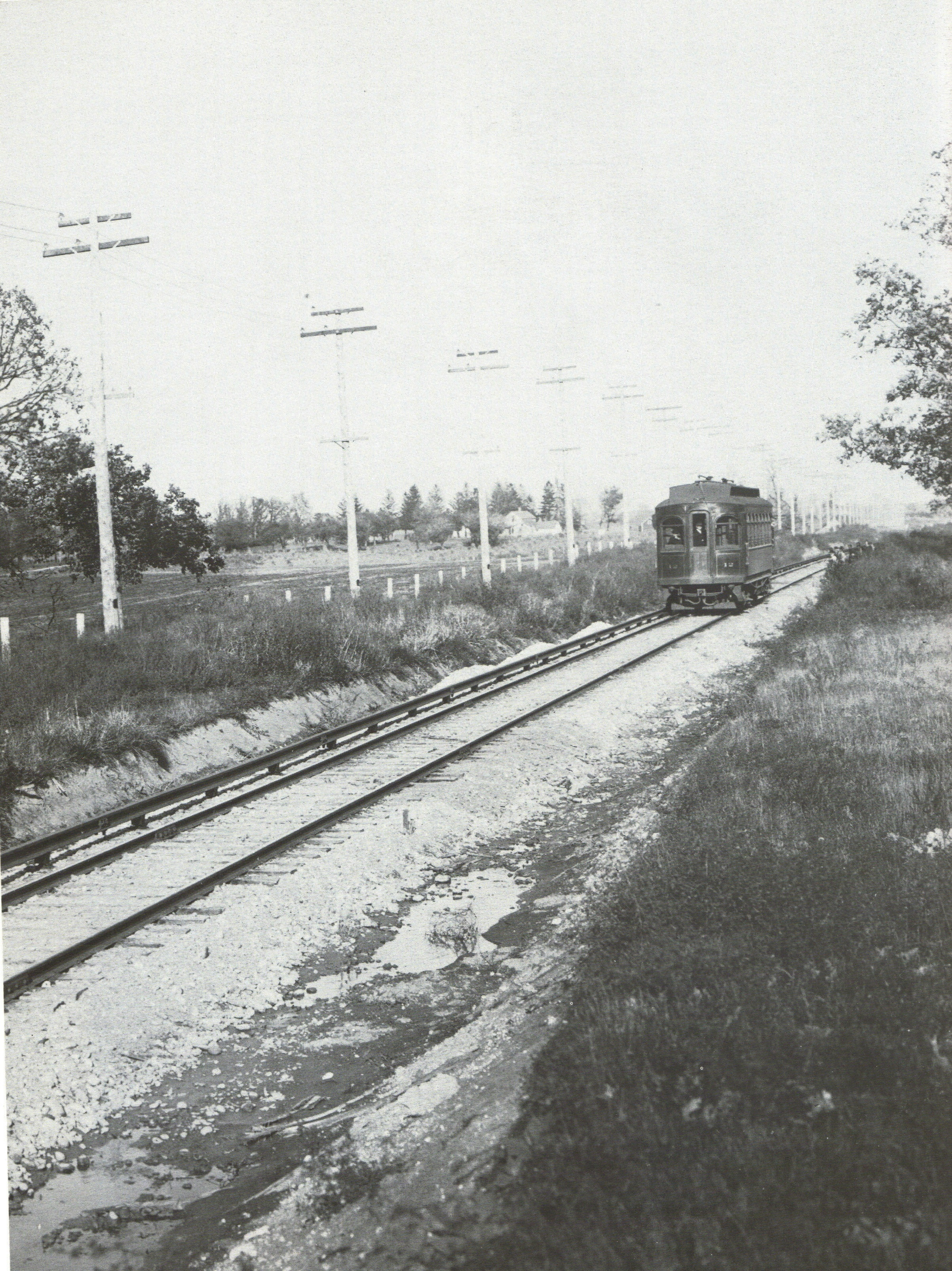
Car 12, pictured southwest of Wheaton on October 22, 1902. Note that the trains ran on a single track on this portion of the line.

The AE&C issued promotional leaflets to citizens of Fox Valley cities and towns. They also sent these pamphlets to settlements west of Aurora, hoping that people would take a steam train to Aurora and then transfer to the electric line. They boasted that the AE&C was the "finest electric railroad in the world." By the end of the year, the AE&C was seeing monthly earnings in excess of $16,500. In addition, the nearby Chicago, Burlington and Quincy Railroad had a dramatic decrease of passengers between Aurora and Chicago.

The twenty cars from Stephenson arrived in December 1902. Fifteen cars were equipped with motors (even numbers 30–58) and five did not (odd numbers 101–109); these latter five cars were intended to only be used as trailing cars. Trailing cars would often be added or removed at Wheaton depending on the number of passengers. The Stephenson cars were almost identical in every respect to the Niles cars. These new cars reduced the travel time between Aurora and Chicago to one hour. The new cars also allowed the railroad to operate at faster speeds—one run from 52nd Avenue to Aurora averaged 65 miles per hour (105 km/h).

Service to Elgin began on May 29, 1903. The 17.5-mile (28.2 km) branch split off from the main line at Wheaton, and allowed trains from Chicago to reach the Fox Valley city in sixty-five minutes. When opened, the AE&C was able to change its schedules to allow trains to leave 52nd Avenue every fifteen minutes, alternating between Aurora and Elgin. All trains at this point ran locally, stopping at every station. The AE&C briefly considered expanding to Mendota in late 1903, but determined that it was not worth the financial risk. Though cars primarily carried passengers, some early morning cars carried light freight. Notably, the AE&C reached a deal with the Chicago Record Herald in October 1903 to distribute the paper to the suburbs along the line.

On December 1, 1909, the railroad added a branch from near Wheaton to Geneva. This was extended to St Charles August 25, 1910. Most of the interurban's lines used a third rail for power collection, which was relatively unusual for interurban railroads. While third rail had become the standard for urban elevated railroad and subway systems, most interurban railroads used trolley poles to pick up power from overhead wire; the AE&C only used trolley wire where necessary, such as in the few locations where the interurban had street running.

Originally, the railroad's Chicago terminus was the 52nd Avenue station that it shared with the Garfield Park elevated railroad line of the Metropolitan West Side Elevated Railroad, and where passengers transferred between interurban and elevated trains. Beginning on March 11, 1905, the interurban began operating over the Metropolitan's "L" tracks, allowing AE&C trains to directly serve downtown Chicago. At the same time, the Metropolitan's Garfield Park service was extended west of 52nd Avenue, replacing the AE&C as the provider of local service over the interurban's surface-level trackage as far west as Desplaines Avenue in Forest Park. The interurban's trains terminated at the stub-ended Wells Street Terminal, adjacent to the Loop elevated. The interurban continued to use the "L" tracks through the years of Chicago Rapid Transit Company (CRT) ownership and into the Chicago Transit Authority (CTA) era.

== The Chicago Aurora and Elgin Railroad ==
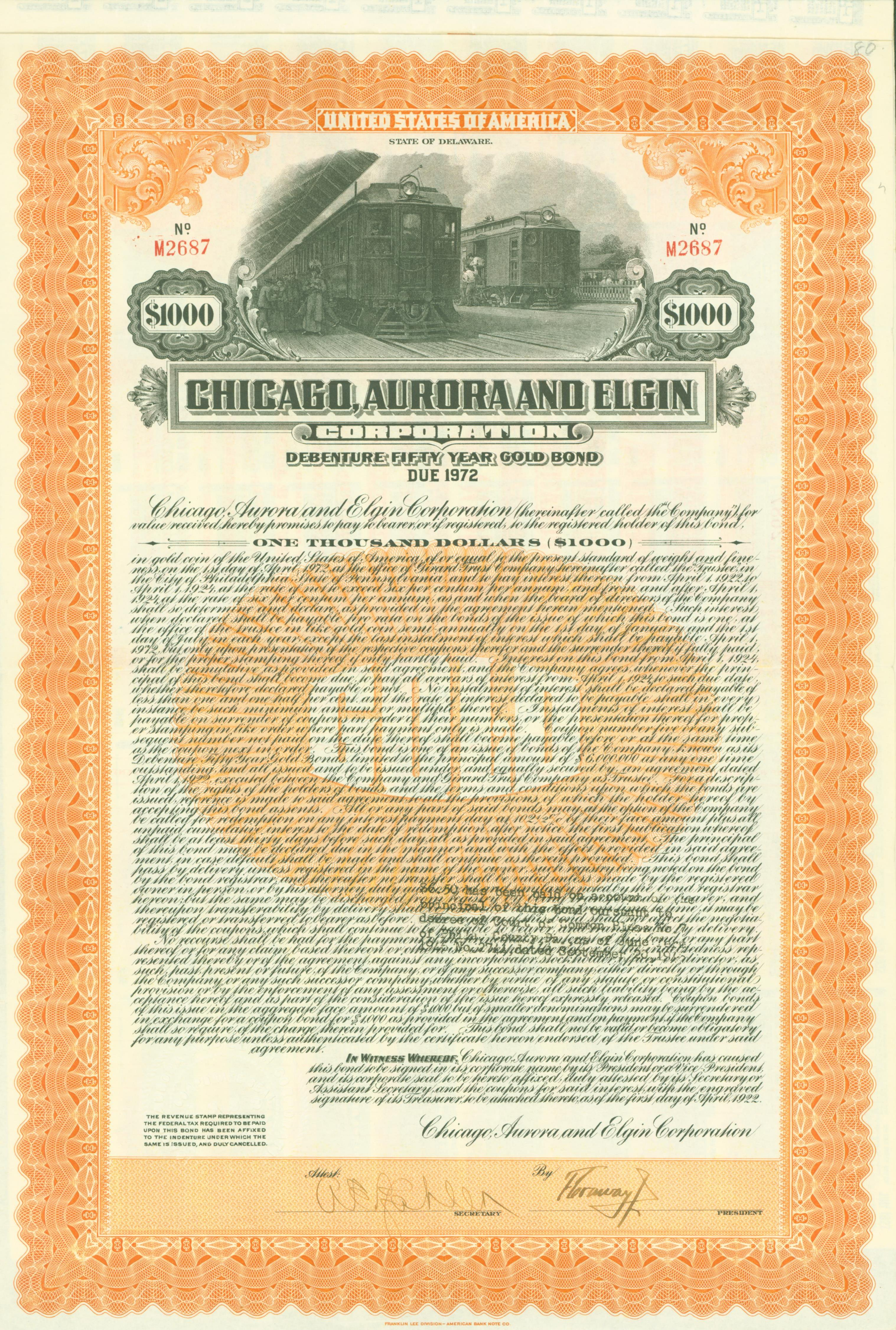
Gold Bond of the Chicago, Aurora and Elgin Corp., issued April 1, 1922

World War I was tough for the AE&C, and the railroad entered bankruptcy in 1919. Having shed the Fox River Lines (an interurban which paralleled the Fox River), the reorganized company emerged from bankruptcy as the Chicago Aurora and Elgin Railroad on July 1, 1922, under the management of Dr. Thomas Conway Jr.

A branch from Bellwood to Westchester opened October 1, 1926. CRT's elevated train service was extended onto the branch; the "L" company was the sole provider of passenger service on the branch and this new service replaced the CA&E's own local service on its main line east of Bellwood.

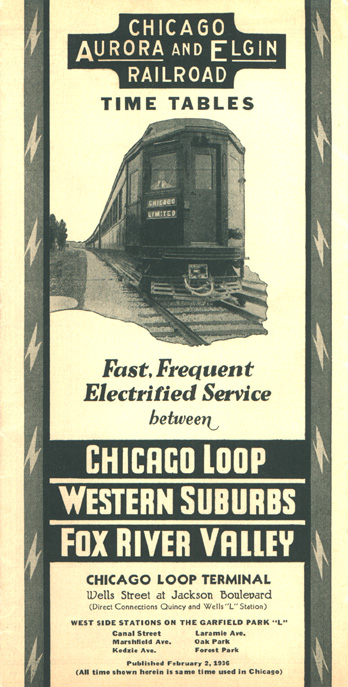
CA&E public timetable dated February 2, 1936. The railroad ran enough service to fill most of a 12-page folder with train schedules.

Utilities magnate Samuel Insull gained control of the CA&E in 1926. Insull and his corporate interests had already taken over and improved the properties of the North Shore and South Shore Lines. Insull's plans to make similar improvements to the CA&E were scrapped as the result of the Great Depression. With the collapse of his utilities empire, Insull was forced to sell his interest in the CA&E, and the railroad was once again bankrupt by 1932. The line connecting West Chicago with Geneva and St. Charles was abandoned October 31, 1937.

=== Postwar years of decline ===
The railroad was unable to exit from bankruptcy until 1946. Even though the railroad suffered from low revenue, high debt, and shortage of capital, wartime revenues and hopes for a stronger customer base in the growing west suburban region led the railroad to undertake an improvement of its service. The railroad made substantial improvements to its physical plant and acquired ten new all-steel passenger cars in 1946 and made plans for eight more, with the intention of retiring the oldest wooden cars that had been on the railroad's roster from its earliest years.

However, the postwar years saw increasing shifts of passengers away from rail traffic and into automobiles, and then the CA&E found the rug pulled from beneath the railroad. The plans for construction of the Congress Street Expressway (now known as the Eisenhower Expressway) in the early 1950s not only loomed as a source of further drain on CA&E traffic, but the right-of-way of the new highway necessitated the demolition of the CTA's Garfield Park elevated line, which the CA&E depended upon to reach its downtown terminus.

The expressway's construction plans provided a dedicated right-of-way for trains in the highway's median strip. However, during the estimated five years to complete the superhighway, both "L" and interurban trains would need to use a temporary street-level right-of-way. When the plans circulated in 1951, CA&E objected to the arrangement, citing the effects on running time and scheduling of its trains as they negotiated the streets of Chicago's busy West Side at rush hour. The railroad estimated that the delays would cost the railroad nearly a million dollars a year, to say nothing of the long-term effects of the new superhighway on the railroad's revenue. Another long-term concern was the railroad's downtown terminal; the new median strip line would have no access to Wells Street Terminal. Instead, the replacement line would access the Loop through the Milwaukee-Dearborn Subway, where wood-bodied cars, which still made up a good portion of CA&E rolling stock, were prohibited.

As a compromise, the railroad gained approval to cut back its service to the Desplaines Avenue station in Forest Park—the westernmost terminus of CTA Garfield Park service, after the CTA ended its unprofitable elevated train service on the CA&E's Westchester line in 1951. At the new Forest Park terminal, riders would transfer from the CA&E interurban to a CTA train to complete their commute into the city. This terminal consisted of two loop tracks (one for CA&E and one for CTA) where passengers could make a cross-platform transfer between the interurban and trains of the CTA operating over the temporary street-level trackage—and presumably the eventual new median strip Congress line. With the change being put into effect on September 20, 1953, CA&E riders lost their one-seat ride to downtown Chicago. Within a few months of the cutback, half of the line's passengers abandoned it in favor of the parallel commuter service provided by the Chicago and North Western Railroad—today operated by Metra as the Union Pacific West Line.

=== Final years ===
The loss of one-seat commuter service to the Loop devastated the interurban. The railroad's financial condition was already shaky, and schemes to restore downtown service faced various legal or operational obstacles. As early as 1952, the railroad had sought to substitute buses for trains, and after years of financial losses, in April 1957 the Illinois Commerce Commission authorized the railroad to discontinue passenger service. Passenger groups and affected municipalities sought injunctions that forced the railroad to temporarily continue service, but as soon as court rulings cleared the way, management abruptly ended passenger service, at noon on July 3, 1957. Commuters who had ridden the CA&E into the city found themselves stranded when they returned to take the train home. Freight operations continued for two more years until June 10, 1959. No trains ran after this point, but the right-of-way and rolling stock were preserved in the event that a party stepped forward to purchase the property. The official abandonment of CA&E came at 5:00pm on July 6, 1961, four years after the final passenger trains had run. The real estate became part of the Aurora Corporation of Illinois, a small conglomerate, which slowly sold off the right-of-way and other properties. Portions of the right-of-way are now operated as a multi-use trail called the Illinois Prairie Path.

== Preservation ==
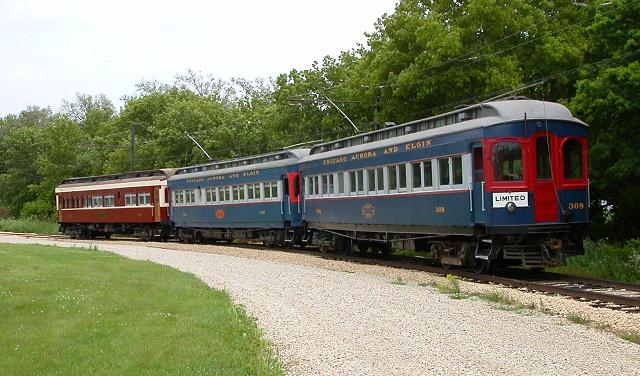
Car 308 in operation at the Illinois Railway Museum

Besides the right-of-way, most of which has been retained as the Illinois Prairie Path, there are two depots, two combination depot/substations, and 19 pieces of rolling stock from the CA&E that still exist.

- Clintonville substation in South Elgin, Illinois is currently the home of the Valley Model Railroad.
- Prince Crossing substation in West Chicago, Illinois is currently owned by Wheaton Academy.
- Villa Avenue depot in Villa Park, Illinois is the home to the Villa Park Historical Society.
- Ardmore depot in Villa Park is the home to the Villa Park Chamber of Commerce.
- Traction Terminal Building in Aurora.
- Terminal Building 2 E. Wilson St Batavia.
- The former company headquarters at 400-402 W Liberty St, Wheaton, is now used for offices..

Preserved Cars
Number	Builder	Photo	Build Year	Location	Car Type	Status
11	J. G. Brill Company		1910, Rebuilt 1947	Fox River Trolley Museum	Wood Interurban Box Motor/Line Car	In Storage
20	Niles Car Company		1902	Fox River Trolley Museum	Wood Interurban Car	Operational/Out of Service for Flange Issues
36	Stephenson Car Company		1902	Illinois Railway Museum	Wood Interurban Car	Operational
303	Niles Car Company		1906	Connecticut Trolley Museum	Wood Interurban Car	Undergoing Restoration
308	Niles Car Company		1906	Illinois Railway Museum	Wood Interurban Car	Operational
309	Hicks Car Works	(Second Car)	1907	Illinois Railway Museum	Wood Interurban Car	Operational
315	Kuhlman Car Company		1909	Rockhill Trolley Museum	Wood Interurban Car	Undergoing Restoration
316	Jewett Car Company		1913	Fox River Trolley Museum	Wood Interurban Car	Undergoing Restoration
317	Jewett Car Company		1913	Fox River Trolley Museum	Wood Interurban Car	In Storage
319	Jewett Car Company	(Second Car)	1914	Illinois Railway Museum	Wood Interurban Car	Operational
320	Jewett Car Company		1914	Midwest Electric Railway	Wood Interurban Car	Operational
321	Jewett Car Company	(Third Car)	1914	Illinois Railway Museum	Wood Interurban Car	In storage
409	Pullman		1923	Illinois Railway Museum	Steel Interurban Car	Operational
431	Cincinnati Car Company		1927	Illinois Railway Museum	Steel Interurban Car	Operational
434	Cincinnati Car Company		1927	Seashore Trolley Museum	Steel Interurban Car	Inoperable
451	St Louis Car Company		1945	Illinois Railway Museum	Steel Curveside Interurban Car	Operational
453	St Louis Car Company		1945	Illinois Railway Museum	Steel Curveside Interurban Car	In Storage
458	St Louis Car Company		1945	Fox River Trolley Museum	Steel Curveside Interurban Car	Operational
460	St Louis Car Company		1945	Illinois Railway Museum	Steel Curveside Interurban Car	Operational
