= Fox River Trolley Museum =

Railroad museum in South Elgin, Illinois, US

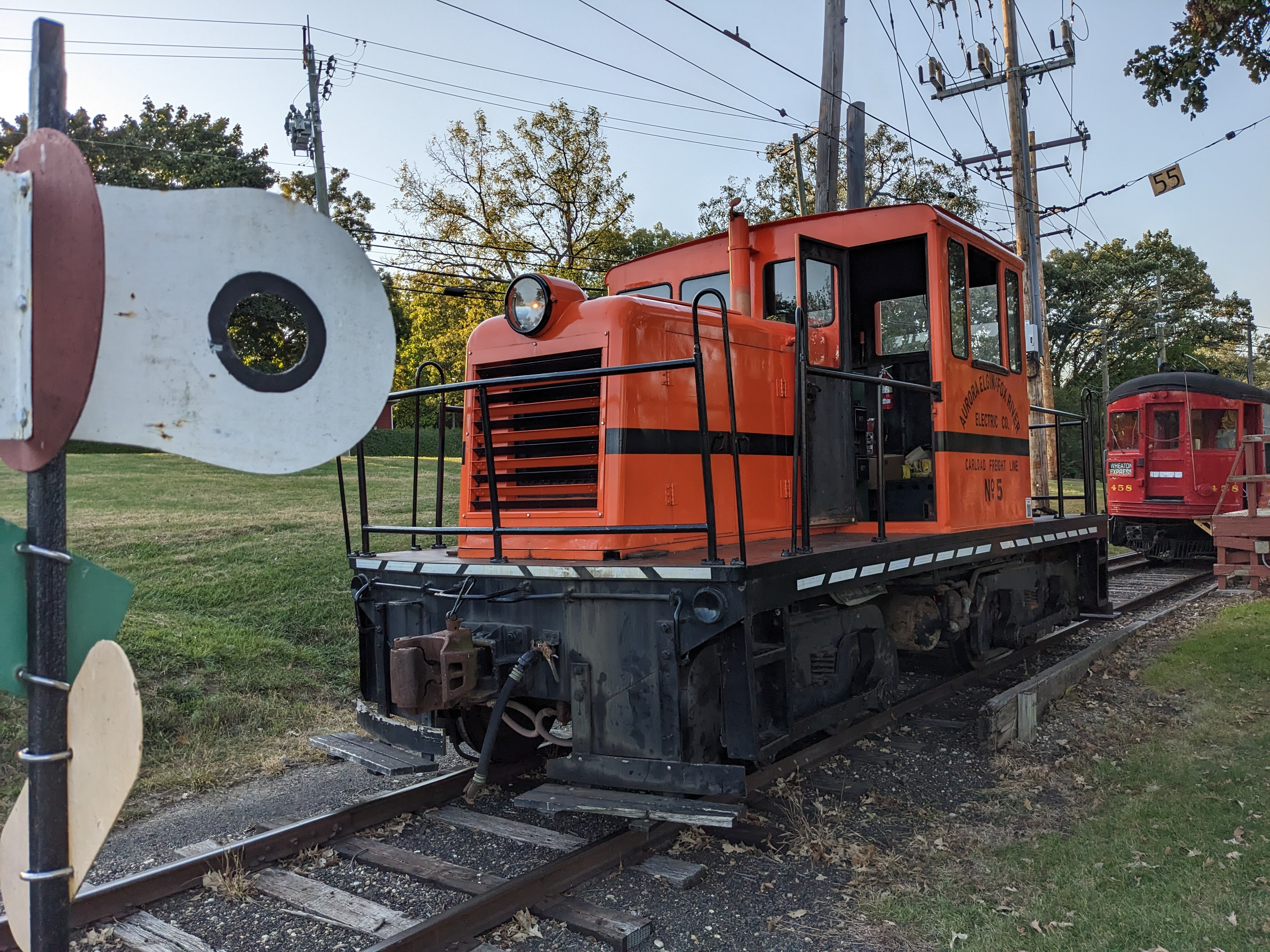
- AE&FRE #5 and CA&E #458 at the museum (2024)
- Locale: South Elgin, Illinois
- Coordinates: 41°59′27″N 88°17′48″W

Commercial operations
- Built by: Aurora, Elgin and Fox River Electric Company
- Original gauge: 4 ft 8 1/2 in (1,435 mm) standard gauge

Preserved operations
- Preserved gauge: 4 ft 8 1/2 in (1,435 mm) standard gauge

Commercial history
- Closed to passengers: 1935
- Closed: 1973

Preservation history
- 1961: Railway Equipment Leasing and Investment Corporation (RELIC) founded
- 1966: Began operating (on leased track from the Aurora, Elgin and Fox River Electric Company)
- 1973: Aurora, Elgin and Fox River Electric Company mainline sold to the museum
- 2002: Extension into Blackhawk Forest Preserve (now Jon J. Duerr Forest Preserve) finished
- 2018: Vandals break in and cause more than $150,000 worth of damage
- Present: Continues to be open to the public on Sundays and special events from May–June, Saturdays, Sundays, and special events July–August, Sundays and special events September–October, and Special events November–December.

Website
- www.foxtrolley.org

The Fox River Trolley Museum is a railroad museum in South Elgin, Illinois, United States. Incorporated in 1961 as R.E.L.I.C. (Railway Equipment Leasing and Investment Co.), it opened in 1966 and became the Fox River Trolley Museum in 1984.

== Location ==
The museum is located at 365 South LaFox Street (Illinois Route 31), approximately two blocks south of the intersection of LaFox and State Streets.

== Volunteers ==
The Fox River Trolley Museum is completely run by dedicated volunteers.

== Heritage Railroad ==
Since 2003, the museum has operated a heritage railroad over a 2-mile line along the banks of the scenic Fox River to the Jon J. Duerr (formerly Blackhawk) Forest Preserve.

The museum operates its trolley excursions from Mother's Day to the first Sunday in November every Sunday from 11:00 a.m. to 5:00 p.m. During July and August, the museum excursions operate on Saturdays and Sundays from 11:00 a.m. to 5:00 p.m.

== Museum Main Line ==
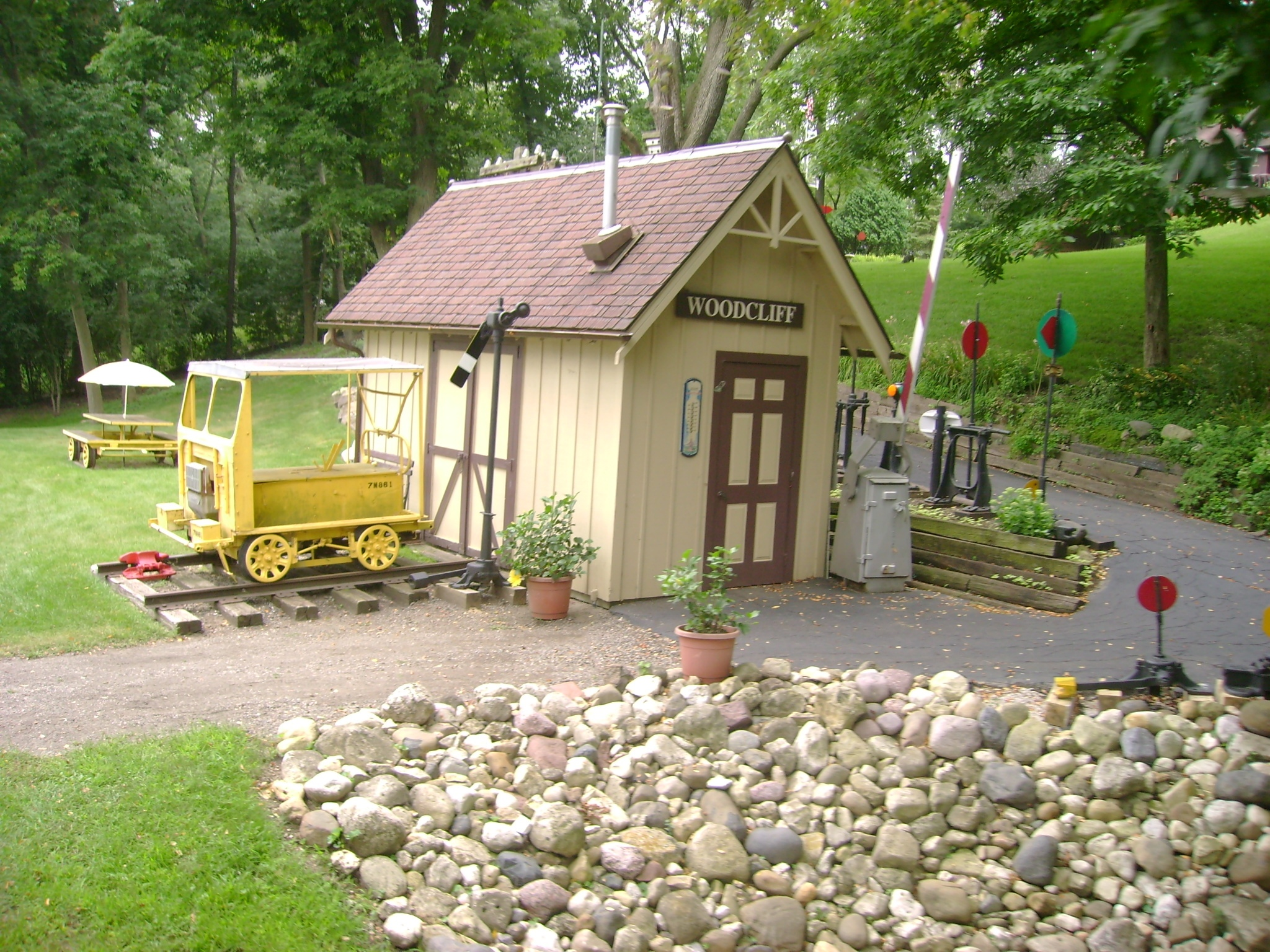
The Woodcliff flagstop building in the backyard of the Woodcliff House (photo taken on a museum trolley).

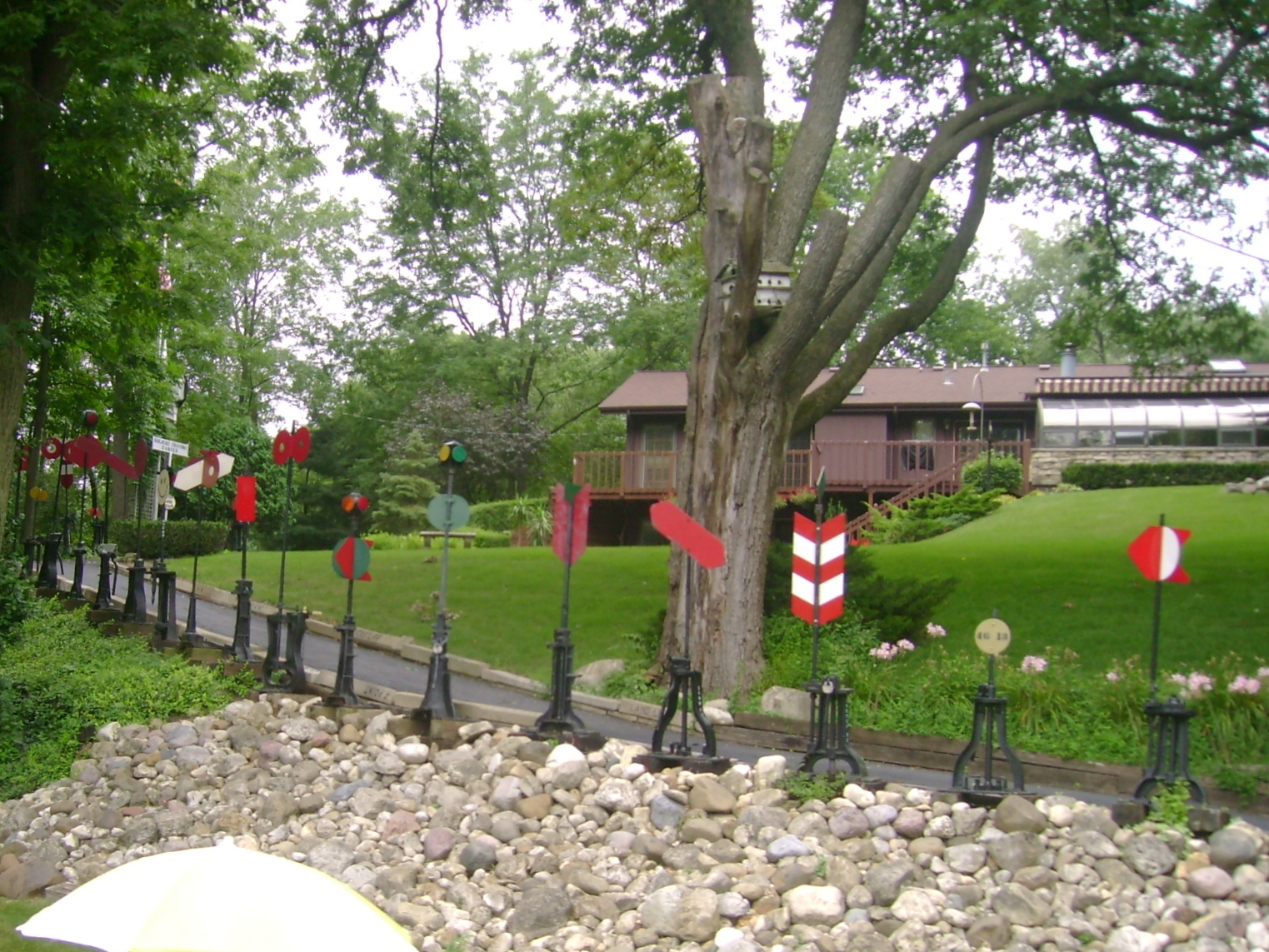
The switch stands and the trail leading down to the tracks in the backyard of the Woodcliff House (photo taken on a museum trolley).

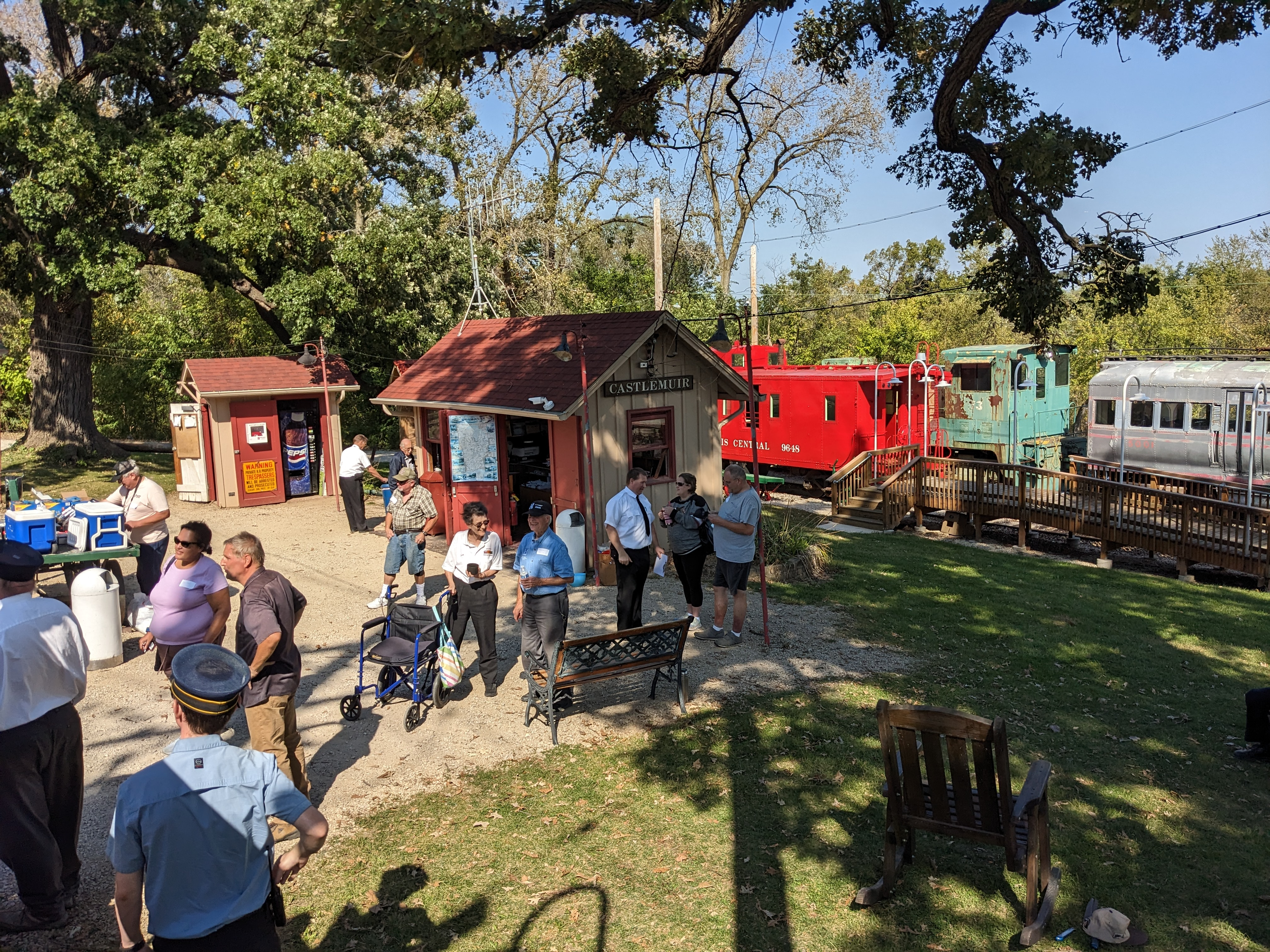
Castlemuir Depot on Members' Day 2024 (Oct. 5)

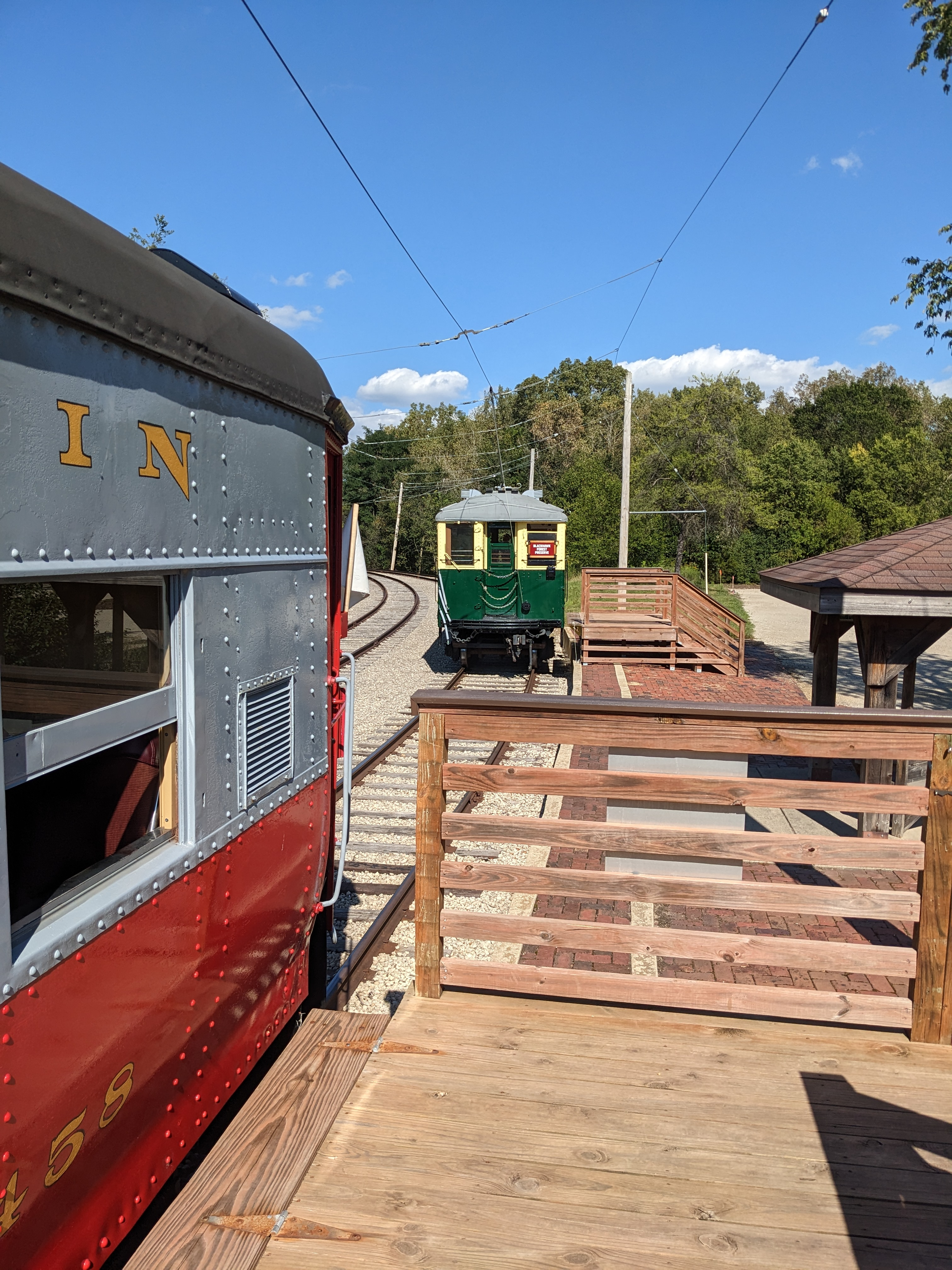
Fox River Trolley Museum's Blackhawk Station with a train (made up of two sections) on Labor Day Weekend

Since 2003, the Fox River Trolley Museum has operated the current 1.9 mile long mainline along the banks of the Fox River. This mainline, which is one of the few railroads in the country that operates within a forest preserve, has two termini. The northern terminus is located in South Elgin, IL, and it is the museum's main campus. This terminus is called "Castlemuir" by the museum (see photo below and to the right), and it houses two platforms, a large train yard, and the museum's maintenance facility and car barn. The southern terminus of the railroad is called "Blackhawk" (see photo below and to the right), and this station lies within the heart of the Jon J. Duerr Forest Preserve. The station is named for the Blackhawk Forest Preserve, which is what the forest preserve used to be named. The museum's mainline also includes one major flagstop, which is named "Woodcliff." Woodcliff is a private residence that is located approximately 0.2 miles south of Castlemuir, and the home is located along the museum's mainline and the Fox River riverfront. Woodcliff, owned by museum member Ralph Treddup until his passing, was bought by the current head of the museum car department. There is a path down from the Woodcliff house to get to the museum's mainline and the adjacent Fox River Trail which is adorned with railroad switch stands and memorabilia, and a small flagstop structure on the mainline (see photos below and on the right).

While the stations and many of the buildings along the line are new, the line that the museum now operates over has been in non-stop operation since 1896. The railroad line was built for the Aurora, Elgin & Fox River Electric interurban railroad in 1896, and it transported passengers up and down the Fox River until 1935. In 1935, passenger service along the line was abandoned, and almost all of the line was torn up, with the exception of 3.5 mile of track in South Elgin, IL. The sole purpose of this line was to transport coal to the nearby Elgin State Mental Hospital, and the railroad was powered by two ancient home-built electric locomotives. The coal for the mental hospital was brought in by the Illinois Central Railroad via Coleman Siding on the Aurora, Elgin & Fox River Electric line, which is now a point on the museum's mainline. The Illinois Central Railroad would bring three hoppers of coal to Coleman Siding every three days, and these hoppers would be brought up to the mental hospital. This system of interchanging car between the Illinois Central Railroad and the Aurora, Elgin & Fox River Electric took place from when passenger service shut down in 1935 until the railroad itself shut down due to the lack of a need for coal by the mental hospital.

Until 1946, the railroad was powered by electric trolley wire. In 1946, the Aurora, Elgin & Fox River Electric purchased a 45-ton General Electric diesel switcher for use on the line, and that diesel switcher was the Aurora, Elgin & Fox River Electric #5 that is now in the collection of the museum (see photo below and on the right). The locomotive handled all of the freight on the line until 1973, when the last freight train on the line ran. In 1961, the Railway Equipment Leasing and Investment Company (RELIC) has founded using a small plot of land in the South Elgin, IL adjacent to the Aurora, Elgin & Fox River Electric line that was graciously lent to the museum by the then owner of the Aurora, Elgin & Fox River Electric, Bob DeYoung.

In 1966, the museum began operating under a new name: RELIC Trolley Museum. In 1973, when freight service finally shut down on the Aurora, Elgin & Fox River Electric, the last owner of the railroad Bob DeYoung sold the remaining line to the Fox River Trolley Museum. The last big development to the museum's mainline occurred in 2003 when the line was extended into the Jon J. Duerr Forest Preserve. Before 2003, the end of track on the mainline was at Coleman Grove, about 1.7 miles from Castlemuir. The addition in 2003 added 0.2 miles to the track length.

== 2018 Vandalism ==
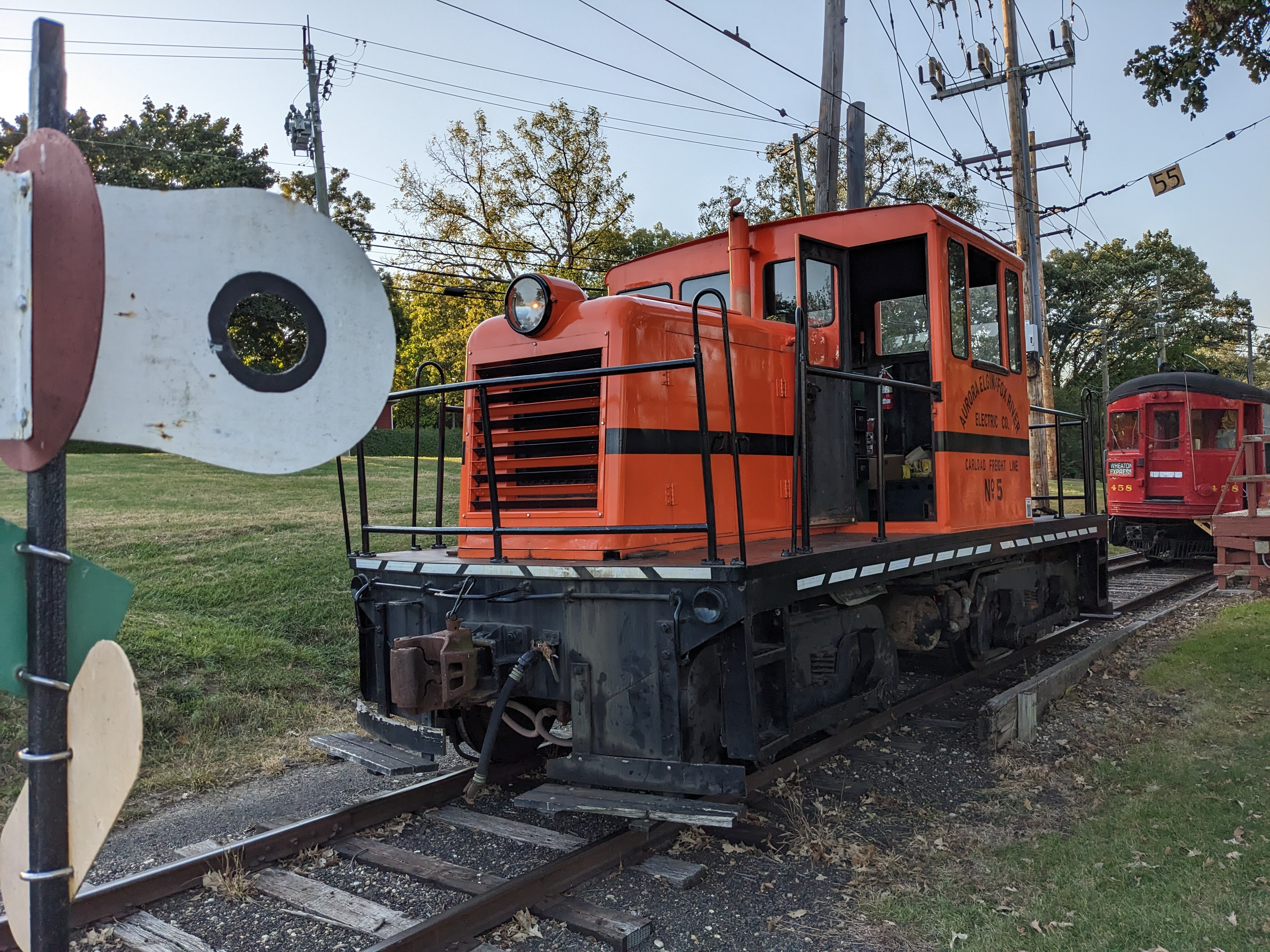
Aurora, Elgin & Fox River Electric #5 at the Fox River Trolley Museum's Castlemuir Depot on October 5th, 2024.

On Sunday, July 8, 2018, two boys, aged 11 and 13 broke into the museum's car barn and inflicted almost $150,000 worth of damage on the 8 antique pieces of history stored inside. The boys first broke into the Maintenance-Of-Way (MOW) Building to get pickaxes, which they then used to cut a hole in the wall of the car barn, allowing them access to the vary valuable and rare trolley cars. They then continued to throw rocks and destroy many train windows and relics. One electric car had 26 windows completely trashed, and another car, CA&E 20, had its extremely rare CA&E headlight almost completely destroyed. The two boys were caught by a woman who was walking along the Fox River Trail, which is adjacent to the museum, and saw one of the boys bleeding. The boy had cut his arm on a piece of glass inside the car barn, and the woman called the South Elgin Police thinking that this was suspicious. Upon investigation, the boys were caught soon after. The cars damaged during this act of vandalism included CTA 4451 (built 1925), CTA 4288 (b. 1922), CA&E 458 (b. 1945), CA&E 11 (b. 1910), CA&E 316 (b. 1913), CA&E 20 (b. 1902), AE&FRE 304 (b. 1923), and CSL 6 (b. 1891). In contrary to the damage created, this vandalism attract the attention of many well-wishers. Many Chicago news channels covered the vandalism including NBC 5 Chicago, ABC 7, and Fox 32 Chicago. This also prompted over 400 people to donate over $50,000 altogether, and glass companies Window Repair Guy and Chicago Window and Door Solutions to donate glass to help with the repair of many of the cars damaged on July 8.

== Car Barn Extension ==
In Early November 2024, the Fox River Trolley Museum announced a new plan to extend their current car barn, which was built in 1984, an additional 50 feet. This project will protect three additional trolley cars from the elements. The project is set for completion on September 27th, 2025.

== Non-profit organization ==
The Fox River Trolley Museum is operated by the Fox River Trolley Association (FRTA). The FRTA is an educational, member-based 501(c)(3) tax exempt Illinois not-for-profit corporation.

== Collection ==
The museum maintains a collection of 30 antique electric trolleys, railroad cars, and locomotives which range in construction dates from 1887 to 1973. The majority of the museum collection is focused on railways and electric transit lines of the Chicago area. One of the most exceptional cars in this collection is the wooden interurban (inter-city) Chicago Aurora and Elgin Railroad car #20, purchased directly from CA&E after that railroad discontinued passenger service. Car #20 was constructed in 1902 and is the oldest electric interurban car operating in the United States. The most recent collection acquisitions include the interurban electric railway car, Aurora, Elgin & Fox River Electric Co. #304, that was built for the Fox River Line in 1923, and ran in daily service between Elgin and Aurora until March 1935. Between 1935 and 1954, it operated in Cleveland over the line best known as the Shaker Heights Rapid Transit. The car was then sold, with three other ex-Fox River Line cars, to real estate entrepreneur Gerald E. Brookins, whose family operated Trolleyville USA, in Olmsted Township, Ohio, in suburban Cleveland, until 2002. AE&FRE #304 made its first run over its original railroad on August 21, 2010, over 75 years after it last ran on the line.

=== Chicago area interurbans ===
Aurora, Elgin and Fox River Electric Company (AE&FRE)
Chicago, Aurora, and Elgin Railroad (CA&E)
Chicago North Shore and Milwaukee Railroad (CNS&M)
Chicago South Shore and South Bend Railroad (CSS&SB)

=== Chicago Transit Authority and predecessors ===
Chicago City Railway (CCRy)
Chicago Rapid Transit Company (CRT)
Chicago Surface Lines (CSL)
Chicago Transit Authority (CTA)

=== Other railroads ===
San Francisco Municipal Railway (MUNI)

Warren and Saline River Railroad (WSRR)

Soo Line (SOO)

Illinois Central Railroad (IC)

Wilson Car Lines (WCL)

Southeastern Pennsylvania Transportation Authority (SEPTA)

Chicago Tunnel Company (CTC)

Canadian Pacific Railway (CPR)

Johnstown Traction Company (JTC)

Rio De Janeiro Tramway and Light Company (RDJ)

=== Fox River Trolley Museum Equipment Roster ===
Name	Type	Image	Builder	Built	Status	Previous Owner	Notes
AE&FRE #5	45 Ton Diesel-Electric Switcher		General Electric	1946	Operational, In Occasional Service	AE&FRE	It was bought in 1946 to replace two electric locos, and hauled coal cars from the Illinois Central Railroad junction at Coleman to the State Hospital in Elgin until 1972
AE&FRE #304	Lightweight Interurban Car		St. Louis Car Company	1923	Operational, In Occasional Service	AE&FRE, Shaker Heights Rapid Transit	It is one of three pieces of railroad equipment in the Museum’s collection that are original to the line (the other two are the AE&FRE 7 and the AE&FRE #5)
CA&E #11	Line Car		J. G. Brill Company	1910, Rebuilt 1947	Awaiting Restoration	CA&E	This car was used to inspect, repair and construct the overhead trolley wire that is used to power electric railway cars, and it was damaged heavily during the FRTM 2018 vandalism
CA&E #20	Wood Interurban Passenger Car		Niles Car Company	1902	Out Of Service, Pending Wheel Replacement	CA&E	It is the oldest operable electric interurban car in the United States, it is also the only CA&E car to have served on the first day of operation and the last
CA&E #316	Wood Interurban Passenger Car		Jewett Car Company	1913	Operational	CA&E	It saw service on the Chicago, Aurora and Elgin until the CA&E ceased passenger operations in 1957, it is Coffee-And-Cream painted interurban car operating
CA&E #317	Wood Interurban Passenger Car		Jewett Car Company	1913	Awaiting Restoration	CA&E	It saw service on the Chicago, Aurora and Elgin until the CA&E ceased passenger operations in 1957
CA&E #458	Steel Interurban Passenger Car		St. Louis Car Company	1945	Operational, In Regular Service	CA&E, Trolleyville USA	This car is one of the few CA&E cars preserved that has a toilet inside
CNS&M #715	Steel Interurban Passenger Car		Cincinnati Car Company	1926	Operational, In Regular Service	CNS&M	One of FRTM's five regular service cars (CNS&M #715, CA&E #458, CTA #4451, CTA #40, and CTA #43)
CNS&M #756	Steel Interurban Passenger Car		Standard Steel Car Company	1930	Awaiting Restoration	CNS&M	It is painted in CNS&M's "Silverliner" paint scheme, where the interurban cars were painted to look fluted stainless steel
CCRy #L-202	Steel Electric Switcher Locomotive		Chicago City Railway	1908	Operational, In Occasional Service	CCRy, CTA	A steel electric locomotive built by the Chicago City Railway in 1908 and rebuilt by the CTA in 1958 (renumbered S343 at this time), it was used in switching service at CTA shops and material handling yards.
CCRy #S-314	Flatcar With Crane		Chicago City Railway	1907	In Need of Servicing, Used For Non-Revenue Maintenance Work	CCRy, CTA	Latest rebuilt by CTA in 1953
CRT #4103	Steel Center-Door Rapid Transit Car		Cincinnati Car Company	1914	Awaiting Restoration	CRT, CTA	This car is a "Baldy" type, so named because of the lack of trolley poles due to the use of a third rail, and it is a rare example of a Center-Door CTA car
CTA #4451	Steel Rapid Transit Car		Cincinnati Car Company	1924	Operational, In Regular Service	CRT, CTA	This car is a "Plushie" type with only two doors per side, and trolley pole on the roofs
CTA #4288	Steel Rapid Transit Car		Cincinnati Car Company	1922	Currently Being Restored	CRT, CTA	This car is virtually identical to #4451 except for a few minor differences, and when is it done being restored, it will most likely be used as a partner car to #4451
CSL #6	Street Railway Post Office		American Car Company	1891, Modified Circa 1900	Awaiting Restoration	CCRy, CSL	Rare example of a Street Railway Post Office, oldest trolley car at FRTM, heavily damaged in the FRTM 2018 vandalism
CTA #5001	Steel Rapid Transit Car		Pullman-Standard	1947	Awaiting Restoration	CTA	Rare example of an articulated CTA 5000 Series
CTA #40	Steel Rapid Transit Car		St. Louis Car Company	1959	Operational, In Regular Service	CTA	Used for FRTM special events, one of the newest cars at the museum
CTA #43	Steel Rapid Transit Car		St. Louis Car Company	1959	Operational, In Regular Service	CTA	Used for FRTM special events, one of the newest cars at the museum
CTA #45	Steel Rapid Transit Car		St. Louis Car Company	1959	Currently Being Restored	CTA	One of the newest cars at the museum
CTA #MS-65	25 Ton Diesel-Electric Switcher		General Electric	1942	Operational, In Occasional Service	CTA	
CTA #6069 (SEPTA #476)	Steel Rapid Transit Car		St. Louis Car Company	1951	Awaiting Restoration	CTA, SEPTA, Middletown and Hummelstown Railroad	
CTA #6070 (SEPTA #477)	Steel Rapid Transit Car		St. Louis Car Company	1951	Awaiting Restoration	CTA, SEPTA, Middletown and Hummelstown Railroad	
WCL #2013	Steel Ice Refrigerator Car		Unknown	1956	Operational, In Occasional Service	WCL	
SOO #130	Wooden Caboose		Missouri	1887	Currently Being Restored	SOO	Oldest car in the museum's collection
SOO #117	Steel Caboose		International Car Company	1973	Operational, in Occasional Service	SOO	Newest car in the museum's collection, acquired in 2023
IC #9648	Steel Caboose		IC	1957	Operational, In Occasional Service	IC	Rare example of an IC Side-Door Caboose
CTC #788	2 Foot Gauge Ash Car		Unknown	Unknown	Static Display	CTC, MSI	Rare example of a CTC ash car, 788 is the only car in existence that survived the Chicago Tunnel Company Flood of 1992. It is also the newest restoration at FRTM, having been restored in July 2024
CPR #7700-12	Steel Motorcar (Speeder)		Unknown	Unknown	Operational, in occasional service for track work	CPR	
IC #F8695	Steel Motorcar (Speeder)		Fairmont	1958	Operational, in occasional service for track work	IC	It was originally stationed at Lena, IL, on the Illinois Central Railroad
RDJ #1719	Double-Trucked Open-Air Trolley Car		Rio De Janeiro Tramway Light and Power Company	1911	Awaiting Restoration	RDJ, Middletown and Hummelstown Railroad	This car was used by the museum until 1983, when it was sold to the Middletown and Hummelstown Railroad

=== Fox River Trolley Museum Deaccession List ===
Name	Type	Image	Builder	Built	Status	New Owner	Year sold
MUNI #1030	Single-Ended PCC Car		St. Louis Car Company	1953	Scrapped, no longer in existence	Scrapped	2026
WSRR #73	70 Ton Diesel-Electric Switcher		Whitcomb Locomotive Works	1948	Scrapped, no longer in existence	Scrapped	2026
AE&FRE #7	Piggyback Flat Car		Standard Steel Car Company	1927	Inoperable	Bob Harris (South Shore Line Collector) in Indiana	2024
CSS&SB #7	Steel Interurban Passenger Car		Pullman Car Company	1927	Inoperable	Bob Harris (South Shore Line Collector) in Indiana	2020
CSS&SB #14	Steel Interurban Passenger Car	(Car On The Left)	Pullman Car Company		Scrapped, no longer in existence	Parts went to Bob Harris, car body was scrapped by FRTM	2020
CTA #6101-6102	Steel Rapid Transit Car		St. Louis Car Company	1950	Operable	CTA Heritage Fleet	2018
JTC #362	Steel Streetcar		St. Louis Car Company	1926	In Storage	Vintage Electric Streetcar Company	2010
CSS&SB #24	Steel Interurban Passenger Car	Note: Car #24 is on the rear of the train.	Pullman Car Company	1927	Operable	East Troy Electric Railroad	1992
RDJ #441	Single-Trucked Open-Air Trolley Car		Rio De Janeiro	1909	In Storage	Middletown & Hummelstown Railroad	1984
CNS&M #415	Steel Dining Car		Cincinnati Car Company	1926	In Storage	Seashore Trolley Museum	1977
PRT #C-150	Wood Rapid Transit Snowplow		J. G. Brill Company	1912	???	???	???
