= Jewett Car Company =

Early 20th-century American car manufacturer

- Type: Subsidiary
- Industry: Rail transport
- Founded: 1893; 133 years ago
- Defunct: 1919
- Fate: Defunct
- Headquarters: Jewett, Ohio, USA; later Newark, Ohio
- Area served: United States
- Products: Streetcars and interurbans

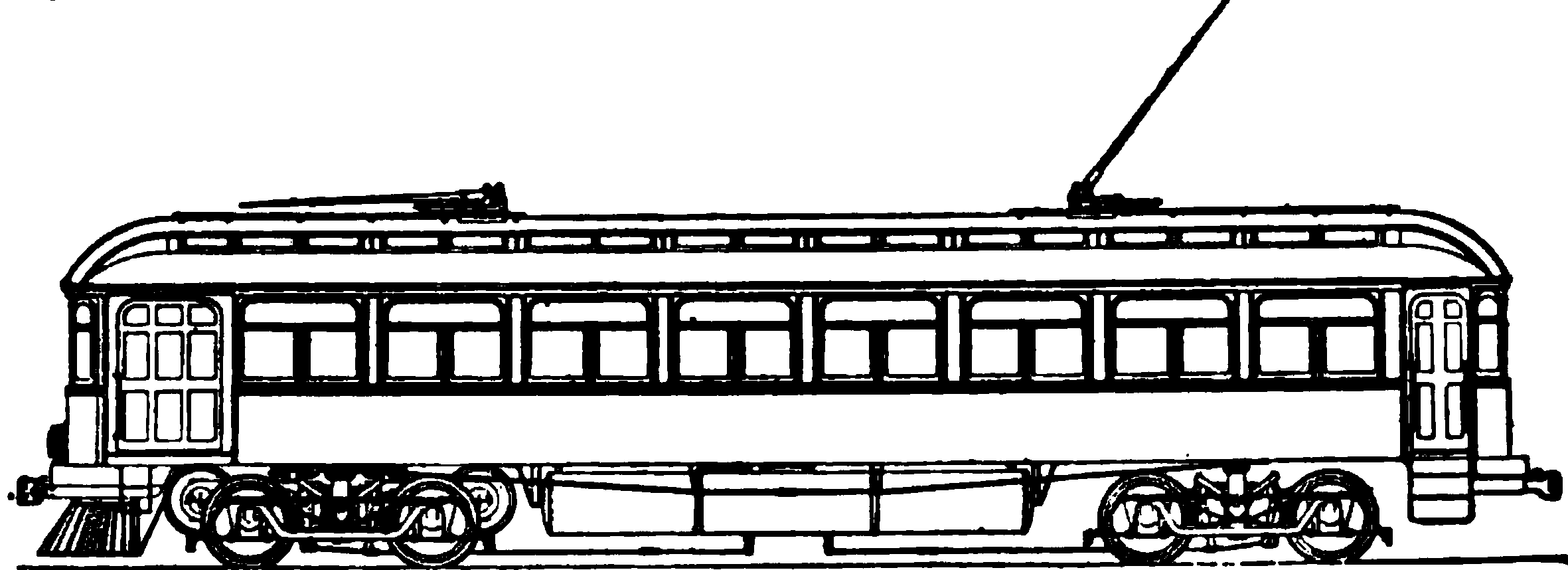
A sketch of a car supplied by the Jewett Car Company and fitted with a trolley pole to connect with the overhead lines.

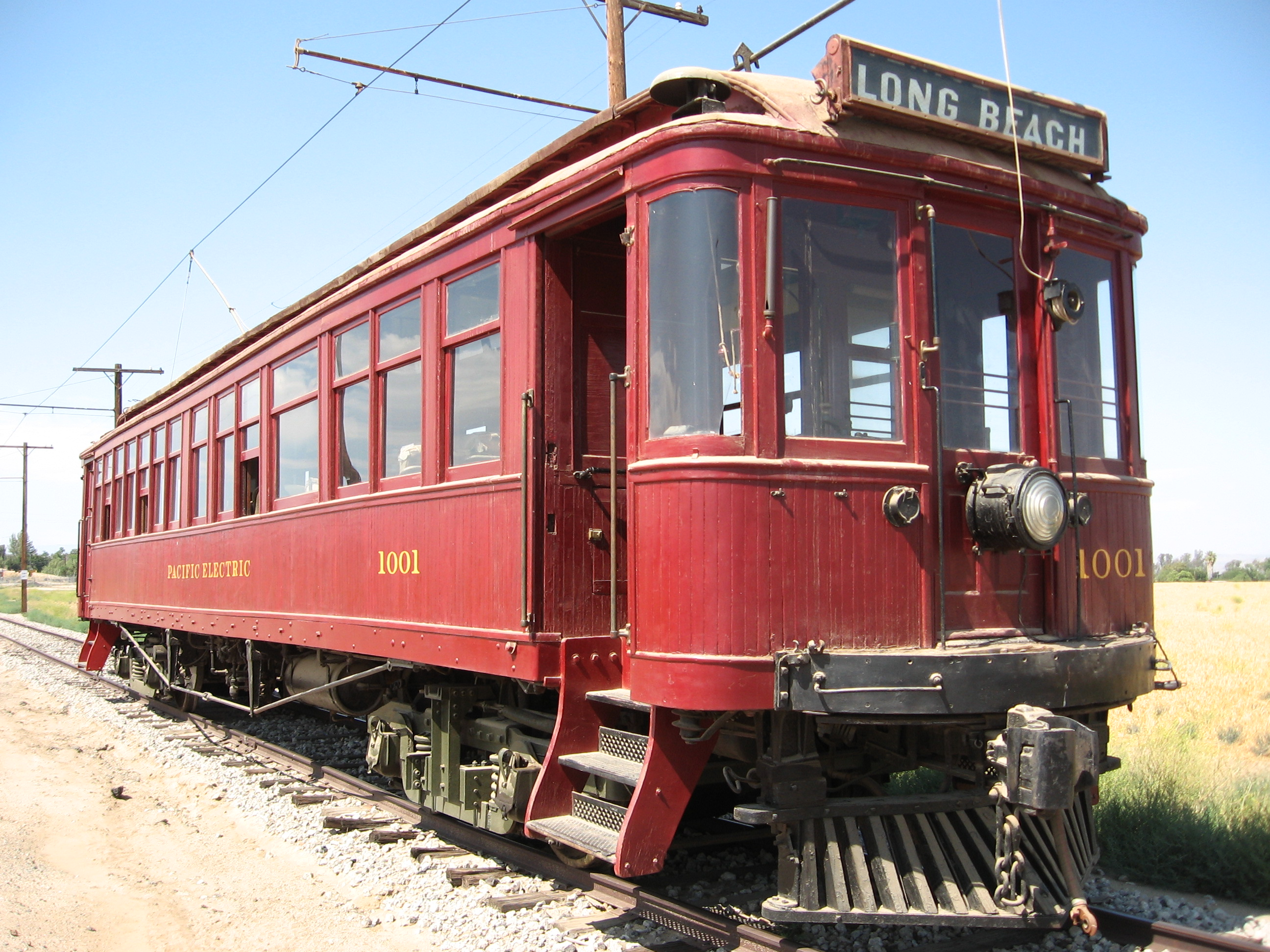
Pacific Electric #1001.

The Jewett Car Company was an early 20th-century American industrial company that manufactured streetcars and interurban cars.

== History ==
The company was founded in 1893 in Jewett, Ohio, where its first factory was located. In 1904, the company relocated from Jewett to a 10-acre (40,000 m^{2}) site along South Williams Street in Newark, Ohio, retaining the original name. The facility soon expanded to become one of Newark's largest employers. Among its customers was the city of San Francisco, California, which purchased several street cars from Jewett. The company produced more than 2,000 wood-and-steel street cars, shipping them to 26 states and Canada.

The Jewett Car Company went out of business in 1919 when the automobile began replacing mass transit.

The most notable Jewett-built cars that are still running today are:

- Brooklyn Rapid Transit streetcar 4547, built in 1906, sees regular operation at the Seashore Trolley Museum in Kennebunkport, Maine.
- Chicago Aurora and Elgin interurban car 319, built in 1914, is operated at the Illinois Railway Museum in Union, Illinois.
- Chicago Aurora and Elgin interurban car 320, built in 1914, is operated at the Midwest Electric Railway in Mount Pleasant, Iowa.
- Chicago North Shore and Milwaukee interurban car 251 built in 1917, is operated regularly at the Illinois Railway Museum in Union, Illinois.
- Connecticut Company suburban car 775, built in 1904, is restored and operational at the Shore Line Trolley Museum in East Haven, Connecticut.
- San Francisco Municipal Railway streetcars 130 and Car 162, which were built in 1914.
- London and Port Stanley Railway interurban car 8, built in 1915, is operational at the Halton County Radial Railway in Milton, Ontario.
- Pacific Electric interurban 1001, built in 1913, operates occasionally at the Orange Empire Railway Museum in Perris, California.

Additional non-operational Jewett cars are preserved at the following museums:

- Canadian Railway Museum
- Connecticut Trolley Museum
- Electric City Trolley Museum
- Elgin County Railway Museum
- Fox River Trolley Museum
- National Museum of Transportation
- New York Museum of Transportation
- New York Transit Museum
- Northern Ohio Railway Museum
- Ohio Center for History Art and Technology (The Works)
- Pennsylvania Trolley Museum
- Western Railway Museum

== Products ==
- Type "B" Iron Monster for San Francisco
- Milan and Norwalk Electric Railway cars
- Wooden rapid transit cars for the South Side Elevated Railroad, Metropolitan West Side Elevated Railroad, Northwestern Elevated Railroad - Chicago, IL
- Wooden interurban cars for the Aurora Elgin and Chicago Railroad (later the Chicago Aurora and Elgin Railroad)

== See also ==
- List of tram builders
