= South Elgin, Illinois =

- Village
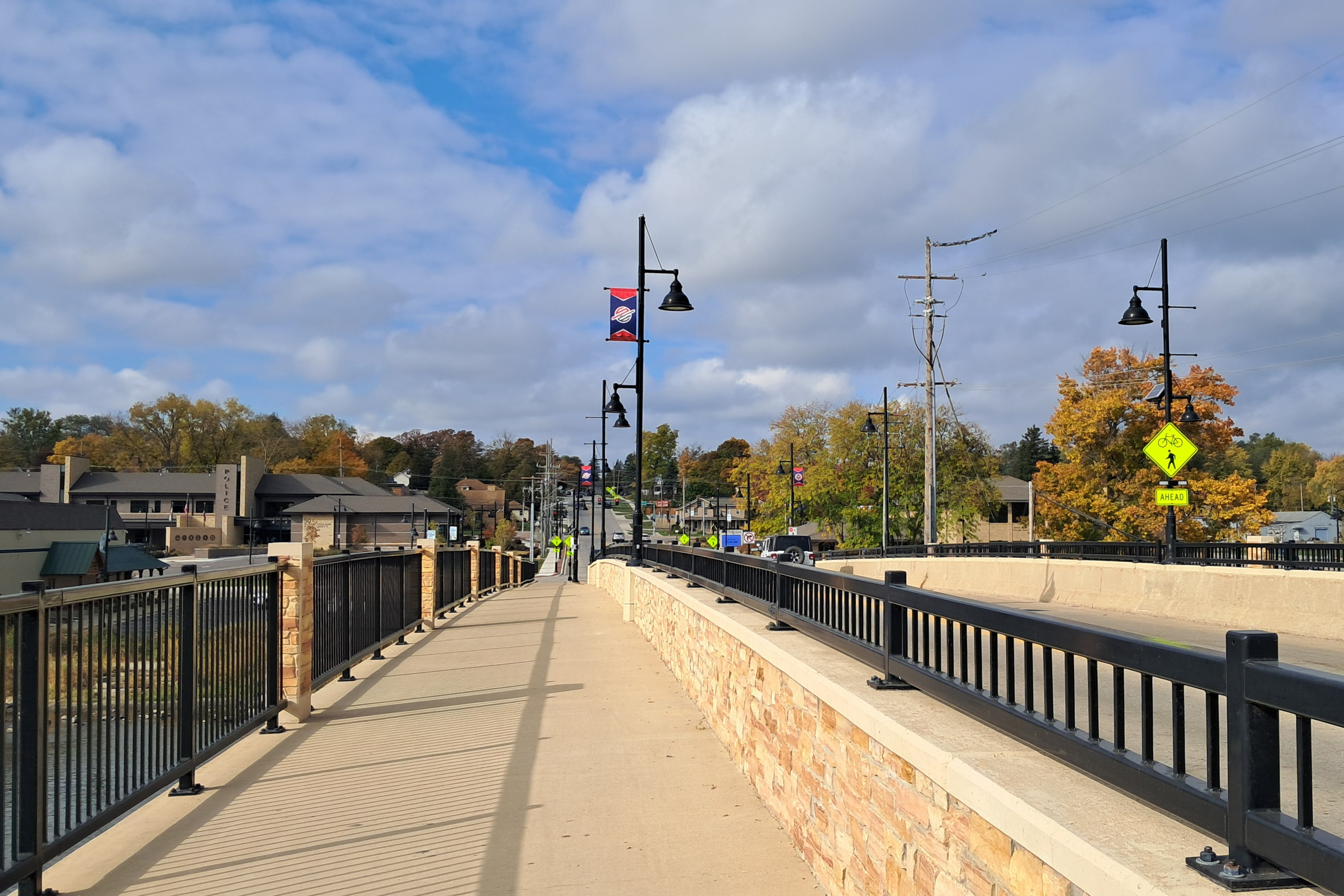
- State Street bridge with a police station (left) and village hall (right) in the background

- Flag
- Motto: "Where Tradition Meets the Future"
- Location of South Elgin in Kane County, Illinois

- Location of Illinois in the United States
- Coordinates: 41°59′52″N 88°18′28″W
- Country: United States
- State: Illinois
- County: Kane
- Townships: Elgin, St. Charles

Government
  - Village President: Steve Ward

Area
  - Total: 7.26 sq mi (18.81 km^{2})
  - Land: 7.06 sq mi (18.29 km^{2})
  - Water: 0.20 sq mi (0.52 km^{2})
- Elevation: 797 ft (243 m)

Population (2020)
  - Total: 23,865
  - Density: 3,380.2/sq mi (1,305.11/km^{2})
- Time zone: UTC-6 (CST)
  - Summer (DST): UTC-5 (CDT)
- ZIP code: 60177
- Area codes: 224/847 and 331/630
- FIPS code: 17-70720
- GNIS feature ID: 2399846
- Wikimedia Commons: South Elgin, Illinois
- Website: www.southelgin.com

South Elgin is a village in Kane County, Illinois, United States. Per the 2020 census, the population was 23,865. In 2007, Money magazine named South Elgin as 82nd of 100 entries in its "America's Best Places to Live" edition and again in 2011 as 98th of 100 entries.

== History ==
South Elgin was originally called "Clintonville", in honor of early settler James Clinton. The name "South Elgin" was adopted in 1897.

== Geography ==
South Elgin is located in eastern Kane County in the Fox River Valley. It is bordered to the north by the city of Elgin and to the east by the village of Bartlett. South Elgin sits on both sides of the Fox River.

According to the 2021 census gazetteer files, South Elgin has a total area of 7.26 square miles (18.80 km^{2}), of which 7.06 square miles (18.29 km^{2}) (or 97.23%) is land and 0.20 square miles (0.52 km^{2}) (or 2.77%) is water.

== Demographics ==
Historical population
Census	Pop.	Note	%±
1890	505		—
1900	515		2.0%
1910	580		12.6%
1920	559		−3.6%
1930	745		33.3%
1940	961		29.0%
1950	1,220		27.0%
1960	2,624		115.1%
1970	4,289		63.5%
1980	6,218		45.0%
1990	7,474		20.2%
2000	16,100		115.4%
2010	21,985		36.6%
2020	23,865		8.6%
U.S. Decennial Census; 2010 2020

=== Racial and ethnic composition ===
South Elgin village, Illinois – Racial and ethnic composition Note: the US Census treats Hispanic/Latino as an ethnic category. This table excludes Latinos from the racial categories and assigns them to a separate category. Hispanics/Latinos may be of any race.
Race / Ethnicity (NH = Non-Hispanic)	Pop 2000	Pop 2010	Pop 2020	% 2000	% 2010	% 2020
White alone (NH)	12,894	15,936	14,935	80.09%	72.49%	62.58%
Black or African American alone (NH)	412	679	821	2.56%	3.09%	3.44%
Native American or Alaska Native alone (NH)	21	17	14	0.13%	0.08%	0.06%
Asian alone (NH)	873	1,515	2,117	5.42%	6.89%	8.87%
Native Hawaiian or Pacific Islander alone (NH)	1	7	5	0.01%	0.03%	0.02%
Other race alone (NH)	14	17	85	0.09%	0.08%	0.36%
Mixed race or Multiracial (NH)	221	412	926	1.37%	1.87%	3.88%
Hispanic or Latino (any race)	1,664	3,402	4,962	10.34%	15.47%	20.79%
Total	16,100	21,985	23,865	100.00%	100.00%	100.00%

=== 2020 census ===
As of the 2020 census, South Elgin had a population of 23,865. The population density was 3,286.74 inhabitants per square mile (1,269.02/km^{2}). The median age was 37.2 years. 25.6% of residents were under the age of 18 and 10.4% were 65 years of age or older. For every 100 females, there were 97.0 males, and for every 100 females age 18 and over, there were 94.4 males age 18 and over.

99.9% of residents lived in urban areas, while 0.1% lived in rural areas.

There were 8,171 households and 6,235 families in the village. Of all households, 41.2% had children under the age of 18 living in them, 57.5% were married-couple households, 13.6% were households with a male householder and no spouse or partner present, and 22.7% were households with a female householder and no spouse or partner present. About 20.5% of all households were made up of individuals, and 8.0% had someone living alone who was 65 years of age or older.

There were 8,509 housing units at an average density of 1,171.88 per square mile (452.47/km^{2}), of which 4.0% were vacant. The homeowner vacancy rate was 1.2% and the rental vacancy rate was 9.7%.

=== Income and poverty ===
The median income for a household in the village was $99,189, and the median income for a family was $108,419. Males had a median income of $56,918 versus $40,124 for females. The per capita income for the village was $41,648. About 4.7% of families and 5.9% of the population were below the poverty line, including 10.0% of those under age 18 and 7.1% of those age 65 or over.

== Education ==
The village is served by Elgin Area School District U46 and St. Charles Community Unit School District 303. U46 serves an area of some 90 square miles (230 km^{2}) in Cook, DuPage and Kane counties. Almost 40,000 children of school age are in its area. U-46 is second largest in Illinois. District 303 covers 57 square miles (150 km^{2}) and serves 13,590 students in the Fox River Valley.

== Transportation ==
Pace provides bus service on Route 801 connecting South Elgin to Elgin, Geneva, and other destinations.

The Chicago & North Western/Union Pacific line to Rockford and the Illinois Central/Canadian National line to Sioux City serve South Elgin.

== Attractions ==
- Fox River Trolley Museum
