= Transit Future =

Campaign to support expanding bus and rail connections in Chicago

Transit Future is a campaign to expand the public transit system in Chicago. The project was launched in 2014 by the Center for Neighborhood Technology and the Active Transportation Alliance.

It is modeled on a successful campaign by Los Angeles mayor Antonio Villaraigosa that built public support to raise funds for major transportation investments. Prominent supporters of the Transit Future initiative include Rahm Emanuel, Toni Preckwinkle, Jesús "Chuy" García, and various business and civic groups.

Advocates have suggested that Cook County establish a "dedicated revenue stream" of some sort to pay for the transit improvements. They argue that compared to peer cities, Chicago has one of the lowest rates of per capita spending on transit.

== Details ==
Six rail extensions and several other projects are proposed, at a cost of $20 billion:

- Red Line extension to 130th Street
- Brown Line extension to Jefferson Park Transit Center
- Orange Line extension to Ford City Mall
- Blue Line extension to Oakbrook Center (Congress Branch)
- Blue Line extension to Schaumburg (O'Hare Branch)
- Yellow Line extension to Old Orchard Mall
- New Ashland Bus Rapid Transit
- New Lime Line running north–south near Cicero Avenue
- New South Lakefront Service
- New Metra SouthEast Service to Crete
- New express service running between O'Hare and Midway Airports
- Bus rapid transit lines in the suburbs
- West Loop transportation center
