= Wrightwood station =

Wrightwood station could refer to:

- Wrightwood station (CTA), a former Chicago "L" station
- Wrightwood station (Metra), a commuter rail station in Chicago
