= 103rd station =

Proposed rapid transit station on the Chicago "L" system

103rd 10300S 400W

General information
- Location: 103rd Street and Eggleston Avenue; Chicago, Illinois
- Coordinates: 41.70704°N 87.63334°W
- Owner: Chicago Transit Authority
- Line: Dan Ryan branch
- Platforms: 2 side platforms
- Tracks: 2

Construction
- Structure type: Elevated

History
- Opening: 2030

Future services
Preceding station	Chicago "L"	Following station
95th/Dan Ryan toward Howard	Red Line	111th toward 130th
Former services (Fernwood)
Preceding station	Chicago and Western Indiana Railroad	Following station
Euclid Park toward Chicago	Suburban service	North Roseland toward Dolton
Location

103rd is an upcoming rapid transit station for the Red Line as part of the Red Line Extension that will open in 2030. In January 2025, the CTA secured $1.9 billion for the project. The station will be constructed adjacent to the Union Pacific Railroad in Chicago's Roseland and Washington Heights neighborhoods.
