= 111th station =

Proposed rapid transit station on the Chicago "L" system

111th 11100S 400W
- Construction site of 111th station, October 2026

General information
- Location: 111th Street near Stewart Avenue; Chicago, Illinois
- Coordinates: 41.69249°N 87.63250°W
- Owner: Chicago Transit Authority
- Line: Dan Ryan branch
- Platforms: 2 side platforms
- Tracks: 2

Construction
- Structure type: Elevated

History
- Opening: 2030

Future services
Preceding station	Chicago "L"	Following station
103rd toward Howard	Red Line	Michigan toward 130th
Former services (Roseland)
Preceding station	Chicago and Western Indiana Railroad	Following station
North Roseland toward Chicago	Suburban service	Sheldon Park toward Dolton
Location

111th is an upcoming rapid transit station for the Red Line as part of the Red Line Extension that will open in 2030. In January 2025, the CTA secured $1.9 billion for the project. The station will be constructed adjacent to the Union Pacific Railroad in Chicago's Roseland neighborhood.
