= Belmont Avenue =

Street in Chicago, Illinois, United States

- 3200 North
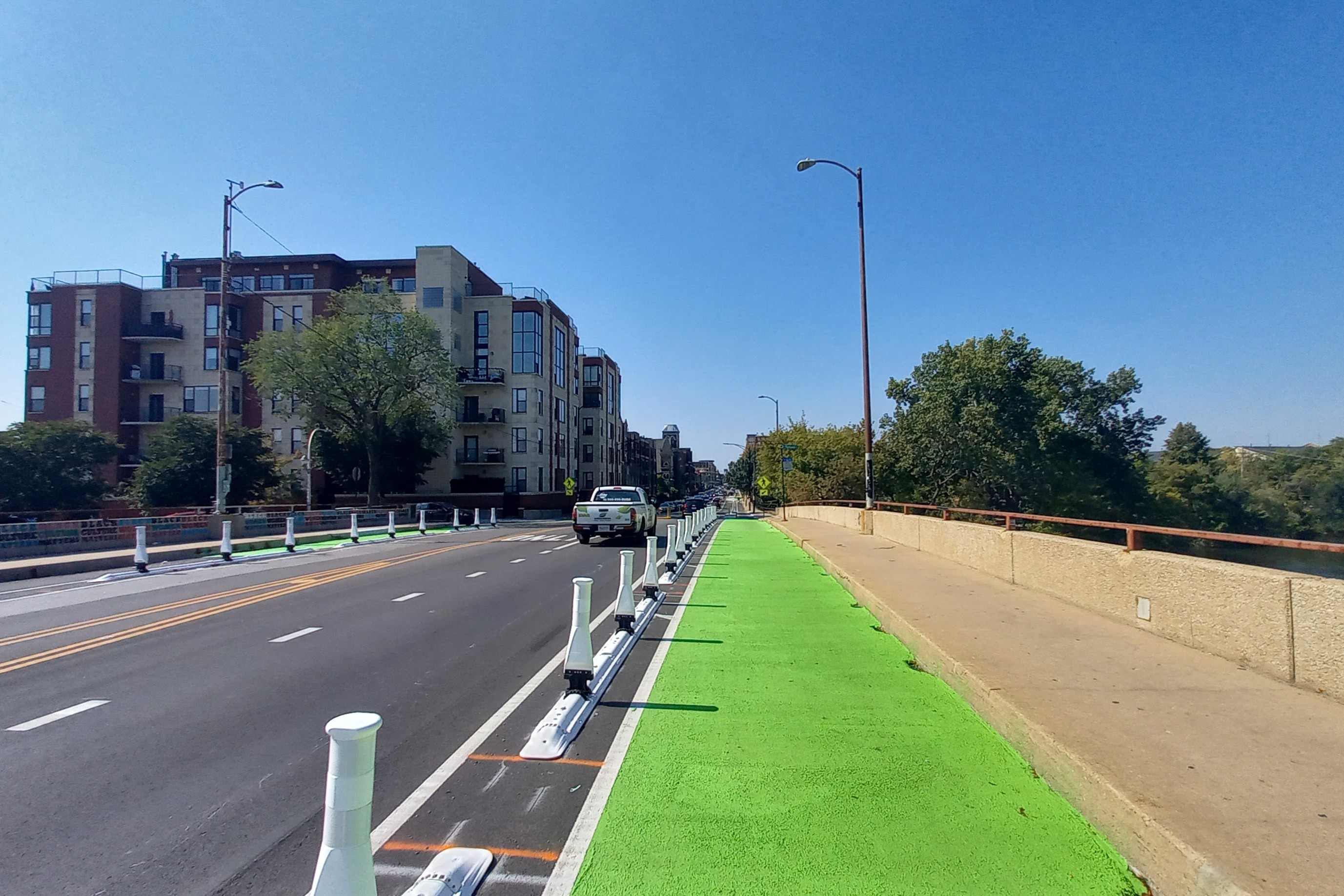
- Belmont Avenue crossing over the North Branch Chicago River, 2023
- Location: Chicago, Elmwood Park, River Grove, Franklin Park, Bensenville, Addison
- West end: Broadview Avenue, Addison
- East end: Lake Shore Drive--(approx. 300 West) in Chicago

Belmont Avenue (3200 N) is a major east–west street in Chicago and several of its suburbs. It begins in the east near Belmont Harbor and is a key commercial street in Lakeview. West of the North Branch of the Chicago River, it passes through Avondale and further west anchors the Belmont-Central shopping district straddling the Belmont Cragin and Portage Park communities. The road enters western suburbs River Grove and Franklin Park before the main segment ends with other parts of Belmont still going west. Then west of the Cook County line parts of Belmont enter DuPage County, specifically in Bensenville and Addison, ending.

Belmont Avenue was the southern border of Riverview Park. The amusement park remained open from 1904 until 1967. The park's property is now home to the Riverview Plaza shopping center, the Belmont District Police Station, and DeVry Institute of Technology.

One of the landmarks on Belmont Avenue was the Bally Manufacturing Corporation complex located between Washtenaw and Rockwell. The building featured neon signage with the corporate logo that looked beautiful when illuminated. Address was 2640 West Belmont, 60618. Bally also had two buildings on the south side of the street; a Parts and Lithograph (print shop) department. There were numerous buildings in the surrounding neighborhood as well. Bally moved manufacturing and eventually the corporate office to the west side of Chicago and to the western suburbs of Bensenville and Franklin Park starting in the late 1970s. The complex was sold in 1984 and after being occupied by Moloney Coachbuilders, it was sold and demolished to make way for modern luxury housing in 1997.

The street was named in memory of the Battle of Belmont during the American Civil War that was fought on November 7, 1861, in Mississippi County, Missouri.

== Transportation ==
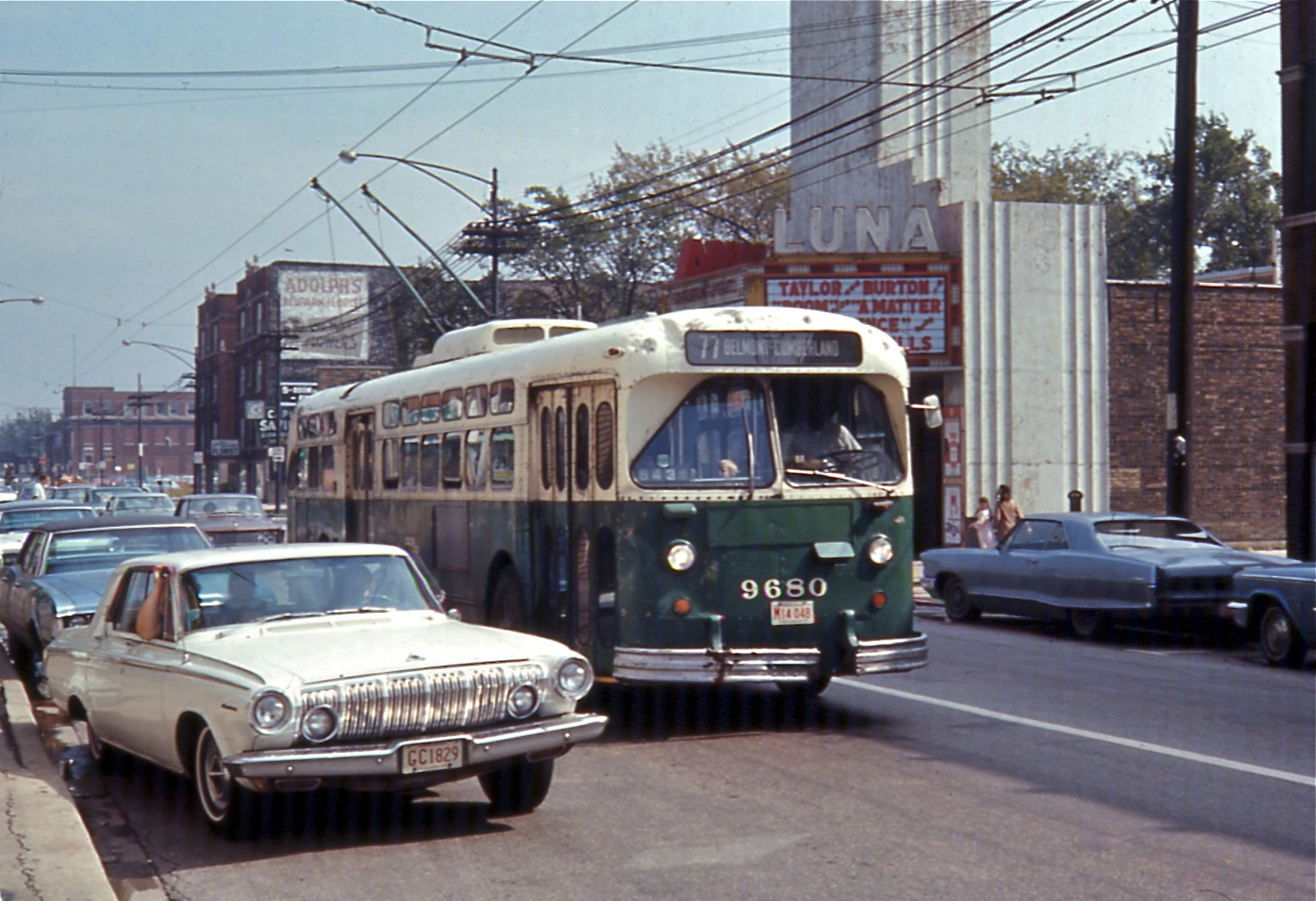
A trolleybus on Belmont Avenue in 1968, passing the Luna Theater, which closed in the 1980s.

The CTA provides 24/7 service with the 77 Belmont between Sheridan Road and Cumberland Avenue. The 94 California, 151 Sheridan and 156 LaSalle serve short segments of the road.

The following CTA lines service Belmont:

- Red Line, Brown Line and Purple Line Express at Sheffield Avenue
- Blue Line at Kimball Avenue

== Major intersections ==
The entire route is in Cook County.

Location	mi	km	Destinations	Notes
Franklin Park	0.0	0.0	CR W22 (Wolf Road)	Western terminus
Franklin Park	1.0	1.6	US 12 / US 45 (Mannheim Road)	
Franklin Park	1.7	2.7	Franklin Avenue	Eastern terminus of western section
Franklin Park	Gap in route			
Franklin Park	1.7	2.7	Pacific Avenue/25th Avenue	Western terminus of eastern section
Chicago–River Grove line	3.2	5.1	IL 171 (Cumberland Avenue)	
Chicago	6.2	10.0	IL 43 (Harlem Avenue)	
Chicago	7.8	12.6	IL 50 (Cicero Avenue)	
Chicago	9.8	15.8	Kedzie Avenue to I-90 west / I-94 west (Kennedy Expressway)	
Chicago	9.9	15.9	I-90 east / I-94 east (Kennedy Expressway)	Eastbound I-90/I-94 entrance; westbound I-90/I-94 exit
Chicago	13.4	21.6	US 41 (DuSable Lake Shore Drive)	Eastern terminus
1.000 mi = 1.609 km; 1.000 km = 0.621 mi: Incomplete access
