= Fullerton station =

Fullerton station may refer to:

- Fullerton Transportation Center, Fullerton, California
- Fullerton station (CTA), Chicago
