= Webster station =

WEBSTER 2200N 1000W

General information
- Location: 945 W. Webster Avenue; Chicago, Illinois
- Coordinates: 41.9214°N 87.6527°W
- Owner: Chicago Transit Authority
- Line: North Side Main Line
- Platforms: 2 side platforms
- Tracks: 4 tracks (2 express)

Construction
- Structure type: Elevated

History
- Opened: June 9, 1900; 126 years ago
- Closed: August 1, 1949; 77 years ago

Former services
Preceding station	Chicago "L"	Following station
Fullerton toward Howard	North Side main line	Armitage toward Loop (Randolph/Wells) or North Water Terminal
Location

Webster was a station on the Chicago Transit Authority's North Side Main Line, which is now part of the Brown Line. The station was located at 945 W. Webster Avenue in the Lincoln Park neighborhood of Chicago. Webster was situated south of Fullerton and north of Armitage. Webster opened on June 9, 1900, and closed on August 1, 1949, along with 22 other stations as part of a CTA service revision.
