= 98th Yard =

Chicago "L" rail yard

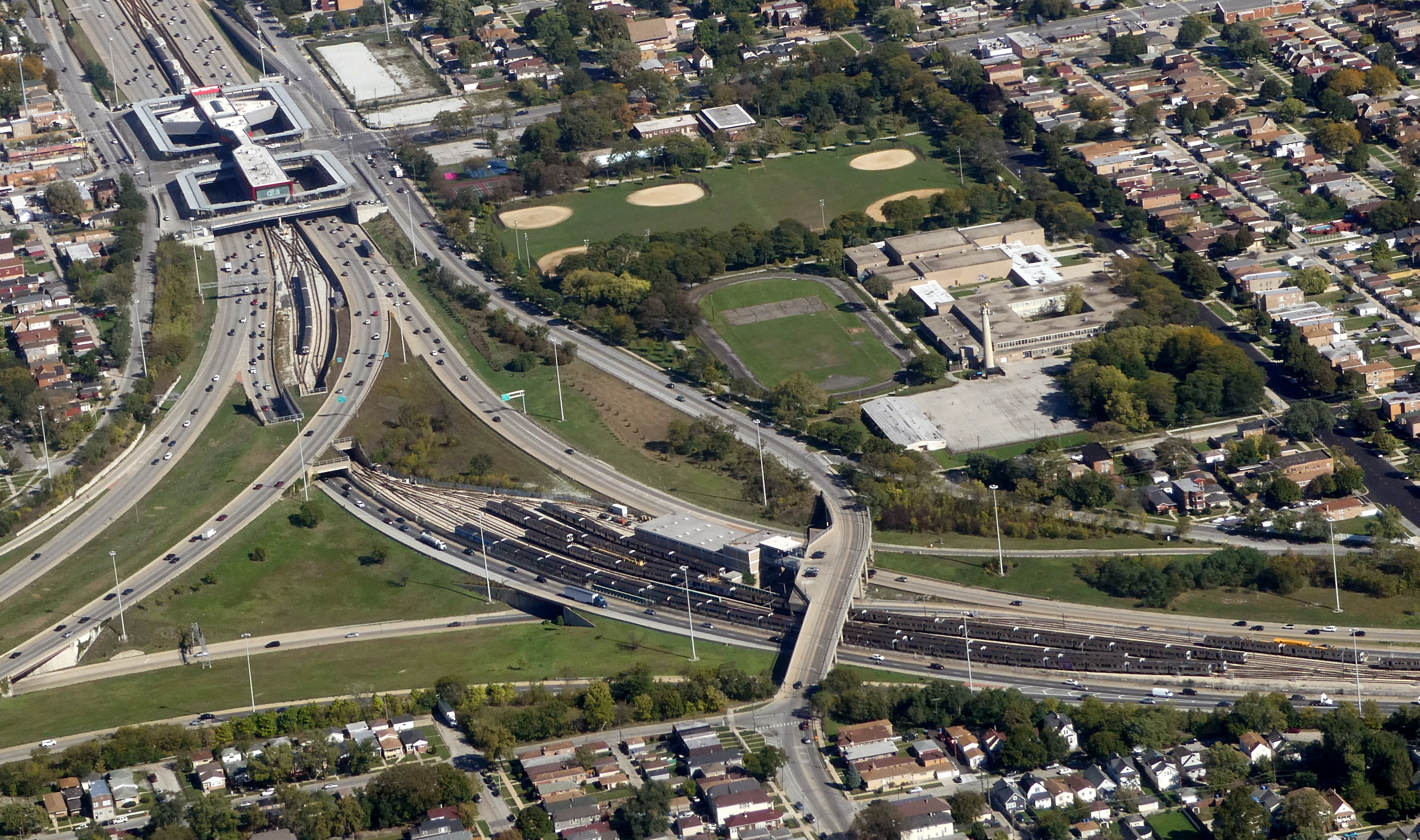
- Aerial view of the yard and the adjacent 95th/Dan Ryan station (upper left) in 2024
- Interactive map of 98th Yard

Location
- Location: 9800 S. State Street, Chicago, Illinois
- Coordinates: 41.715812°N 87.623316°W

Characteristics
- Owner: Chicago Transit Authority
- Type: Rapid transit
- Rolling stock: 5000-series
- Routes served: Red

History
- Opened: 1969; 57 years ago

The 98th Yard is a CTA rail yard in the Roseland neighborhood in the South Side of Chicago, Illinois which stores cars from the Red Line of the Chicago Transit Authority. It is located at 9800 S. State Street, at the intersection of 98th Street with the Dan Ryan Expressway. Currently, 5000-series railcars are stored here.
