= Michigan station (CTA) =

Proposed rapid transit station on the Chicago "L" system

Michigan 11600S 100E
- Construction site for Michigan station, October 2026

General information
- Location: Michigan Avenue near 116th Street; Chicago, Illinois
- Coordinates: 41.68321°N 87.62067°W
- Owner: Chicago Transit Authority
- Line: Dan Ryan branch
- Platforms: 2 side platforms
- Tracks: 2

Construction
- Structure type: Elevated

History
- Opening: 2030

Future services
| Preceding station | Chicago "L" | Following station |
|---|---|---|
| 111th toward Howard | Red Line | 130th Terminus |
Former services (Kensington)
| Preceding station | Chicago and Western Indiana Railroad | Following station |
|---|---|---|
| Sheldon Park toward Chicago | Suburban service | Dolton Terminus |
| Preceding station | Chicago and Eastern Illinois Railroad | Following station |
| Englewood (State street 1904–1913) toward Chicago | Main Line | Dolton toward Evansville |
| Englewood (State street 1904–1913) toward Chicago | Chicago – St. Louis | Dolton toward St. Louis |
Location

Michigan is an upcoming rapid transit station for the Red Line as part of the Red Line Extension that will open in 2030. In January 2025, the CTA secured $1.9 billion for the project. The station will be constructed adjacent to the Union Pacific Railroad in Chicago's West Pullman neighborhood.
