= Wellington station (CTA) =

Chicago "L" station

Wellington 3000N 1000W
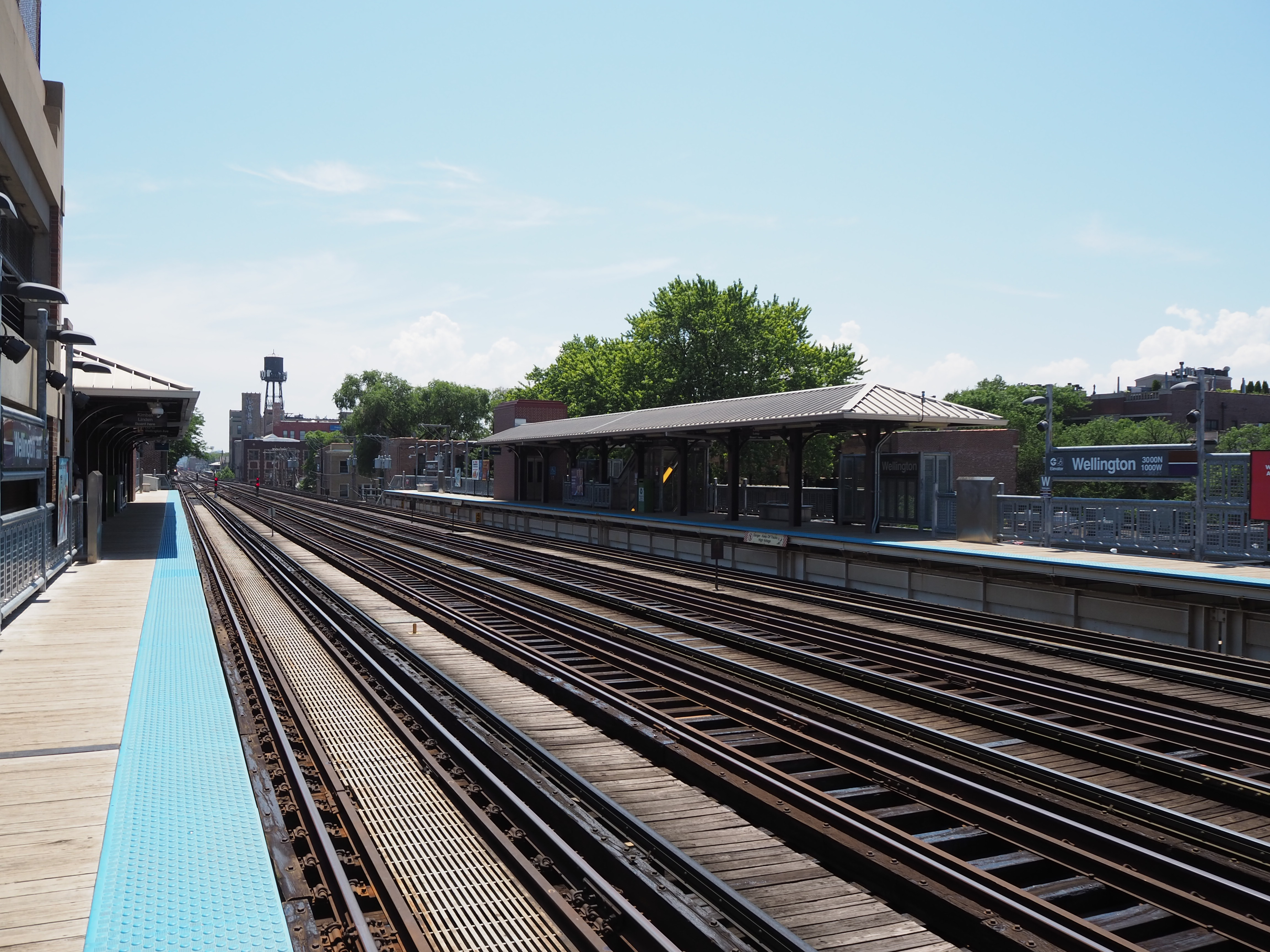

General information
- Location: 945 West Wellington Avenue; Chicago, Illinois 60657
- Coordinates: 41.936203°N 87.653239°W
- Owner: Chicago Transit Authority
- Line: North Side Main Line
- Platforms: 2 side platforms
- Tracks: 4

Construction
- Structure type: Elevated
- Cycle facilities: Yes
- Accessible: Yes

History
- Opened: May 31, 1900; 126 years ago
- Rebuilt: 2008–2009; 17 years ago

Passengers
- 2025: 600,625 ▲7.1%

Services
Preceding station	Chicago "L"	Following station
Belmont toward Kimball	Brown Line	Diversey toward Loop (Washington/Wells)
Belmont toward Linden	Purple Line Express	Diversey toward Loop (Clark/Lake)
Red Line does not stop here
Track layout
Location

Wellington is a station on the Chicago Transit Authority (CTA) Brown Line; Purple Line express trains also stop at the station during weekday rush hours. It is an elevated station with four tracks and two side platforms, located at 945 West Wellington Avenue in the Lakeview neighborhood of Chicago, Illinois. Red Line trains pass through the station on the middle tracks, but do not stop. The station closed for renovations from March 30, 2008, until July 30, 2009. The station is also adjacent to Advocate Illinois Masonic Medical Center, one of Chicago's three Level I trauma centers.

== History ==
Wellington station opened in 1900 as a local station on the original Northwestern Elevated Railroad route from Lake and Wells in downtown to Wilson Station. From the late 1940s Wellington became a station on the Ravenswood route (now the Brown Line). The original station house was demolished in the 1960s following a fire. Purple Line express trains began stopping at the station in 1998 as part of an effort to help alleviate congestion on the Brown Line.

=== Brown Line Capacity Expansion Project ===
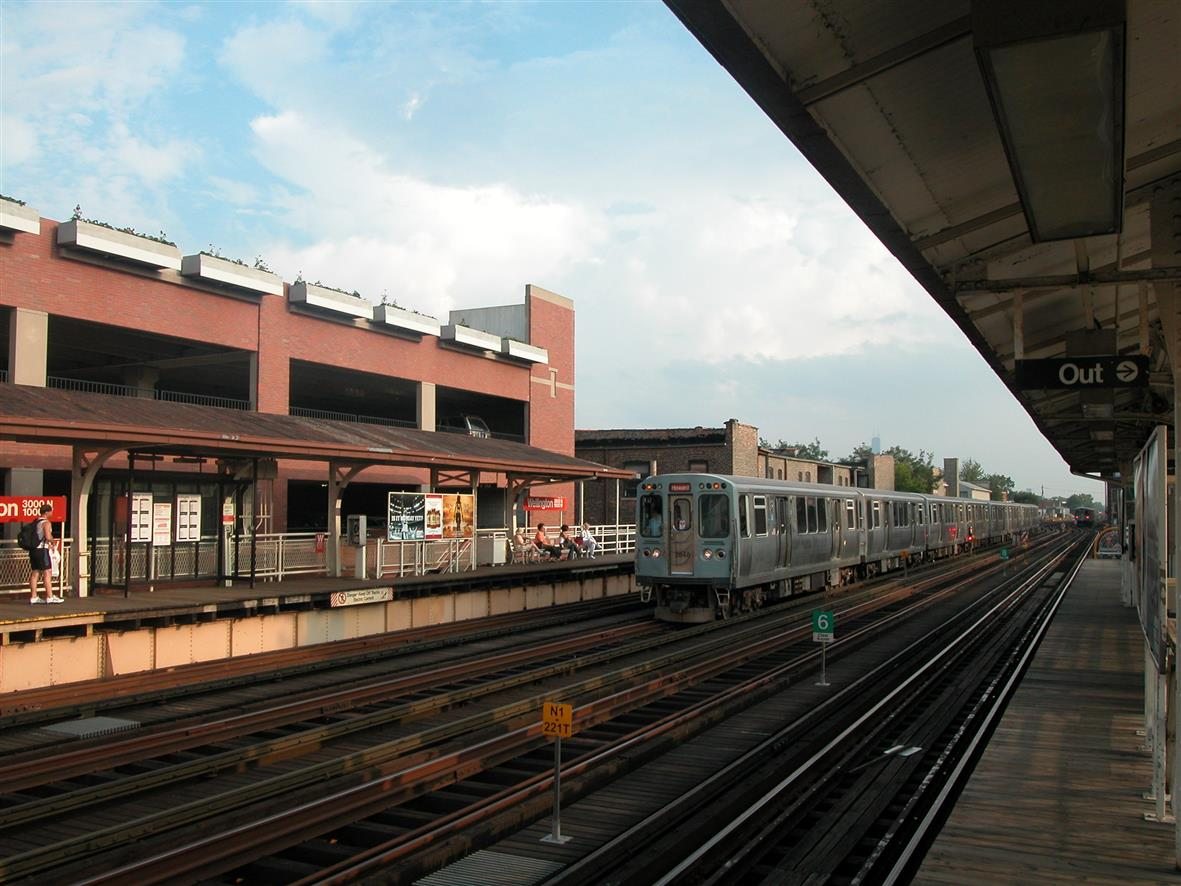
Wellington station prior to reconstruction, September 2007. The red station signs are indicative of the station's former designation as an "A" station during the period of skip-stop service

Wellington was reconstructed and renovated as part of the Brown Line Capacity Expansion Project. The new station has extended platforms capable of berthing eight car trains, and added elevators make the station accessible to passengers with disabilities. The Wellington station closed for renovations on March 30, 2008. The station reopened on July 30, 2009.
