= Peter Schivarelli =

American politician (born 1945)

Peter Schivarelli (born 1945 in Chicago) is the manager of the rock band Chicago. He was previously Chicago chief of snow command, former sanitation superintendent of Chicago's 43rd ward, and former owner of Demon Dogs, a popular hot dog stand in Lincoln Park, Chicago. He was also a manager of B'Ginnings, a music venue opened by Chicago's drummer Danny Seraphine in Schaumburg, Illinois, in 1974

== Personal life ==
Schivarelli was born in Chicago. He attended St. Ignatius College Prep high school and The University of Notre Dame, where he was also a football player from 1969 to 1970. his jersey number was 68.

In the 1970s Schivarelli had owned a half share of the Francis J. Dewes House.

== Philanthropy and public service ==
In 1982, it was noted that while the city of Chicago had purchased snow-removal vehicles, every ward superintendent except Schivarelli was using the vehicles for personal use. Schivarelli had stated that he drove his own car and had used the vehicle to keep open access routes to hospitals in the 43rd ward.

Schivarelli has been a supporter of the Ara Parseghian Medical Research Foundation, the Hannah & Friends charity and he founded a residential community for people with special needs and disabilities. He has received an award from the Lincoln Park conservation association during his tenure as superintendent of the 43rd ward.

In 2015, Schivarelli and Chicago auctioned a sculpture to benefit families of fallen Chicago Police officers.

== Lawsuits ==
Schivarelli sued CBS, WBBM-TV, and Pam Zekman for "...defamation, false light invasion of privacy, commercial misappropriation, and commercial disparagement" over an ad campaign that was aired on WBBM in the 1990s that referenced a news report depicting Schivarelli conducting personal business while employed by the City of Chicago. Schivarelli retired from the position in 1998. In 2005, he sued the Chicago Transit Authority over the lease for the space to his restaurant, Demon Dogs.
