= Diversey station =

Chicago "L" station

Diversey 2800N 1000W
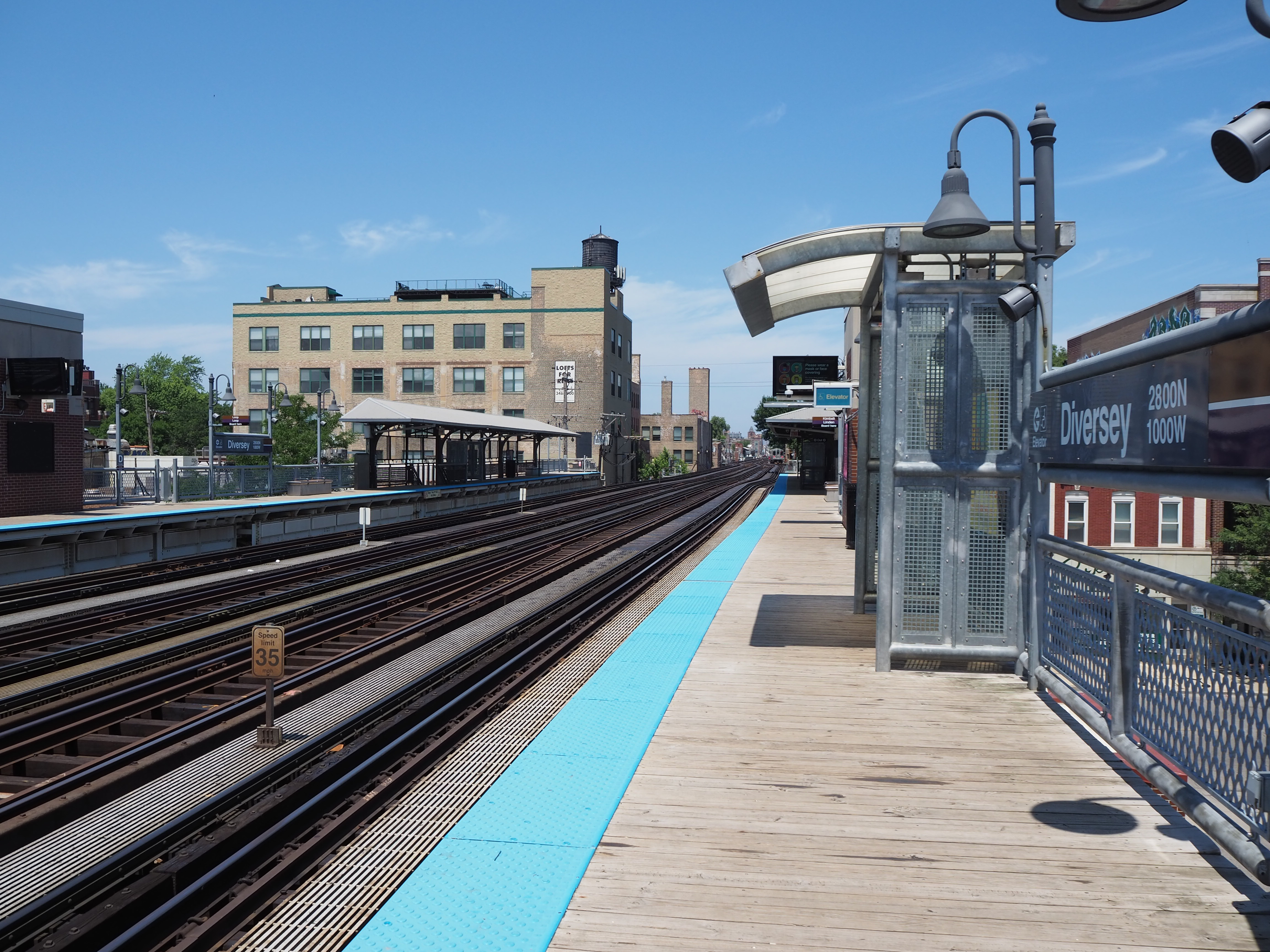

General information
- Location: 943 West Diversey Parkway; Chicago, Illinois 60614
- Coordinates: 41.932748°N 87.653155°W
- Owner: Chicago Transit Authority
- Line: North Side main line
- Platforms: 2 side platforms
- Tracks: 4

Construction
- Structure type: Elevated
- Cycle facilities: Yes
- Accessible: Yes

History
- Opened: June 9, 1900; 126 years ago
- Rebuilt: 2007–2008; 18 years ago

Passengers
- 2025: 1,060,580 ▲10.3%

Services
Preceding station	Chicago "L"	Following station
Wellington toward Kimball	Brown Line	Fullerton toward Loop (Washington/Wells)
Wellington toward Linden	Purple Line Express	Fullerton toward Loop (Clark/Lake)
Red Line does not stop here
Former services
Preceding station	Chicago "L"	Following station
Wellington toward Howard	North Side main line	Wrightwood Closed 1949 toward Loop (Randolph/Wells) or North Water Terminal
Track layout
Location

Diversey is an 'L' station on the CTA Brown Line; Purple Line express trains also stop at the station during weekday rush hours. It is an elevated station with two side platforms, located in the Lincoln Park neighborhood of Chicago, Illinois. Red Line trains pass through the station on the middle tracks, but do not stop.

== History ==
Diversey station opened on June 9, 1900, as a local station on the original Northwestern Elevated Railroad route from Lake and Wells in downtown to Wilson Station. From the late 1940s Diversey became a station on the Ravenswood route (now the Brown Line). Purple Line express trains began stopping at the station in 1998 as part of an effort to help alleviate congestion on the Brown Line.

=== Brown Line Capacity Expansion Project ===
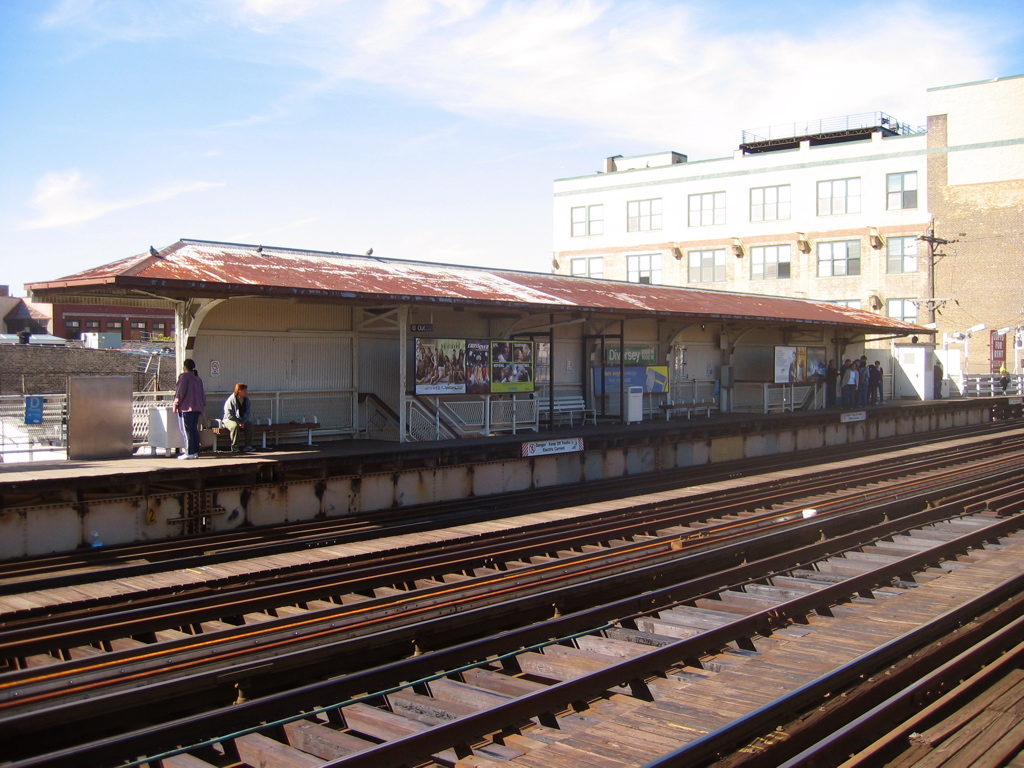
Diversey station in October 2006, prior to reconstruction

Diversey was reconstructed and renovated as part of the Brown Line Capacity Expansion Project. The new station is located on the south side of Diversey Parkway, and the current location (the north side) was preserved and restored (the future use of the restored original station building is currently unknown). An auxiliary exit is located next door to the original building. It features extended platforms capable of berthing eight railcars, and elevators to be accessible to passengers with disabilities. It also retains many of its historic elements. On June 25, 2007, the station closed for reconstruction. The station reopened with a temporary entrance (located next door to the original entrance) on March 30, 2008. The new permanent station entrance opened on August 4, 2008.

== Bus connections ==
CTA

- 76 Diversey
