= Belmont station (CTA North Side Main Line) =

Chicago "L" station

Belmont 3200N 1000W
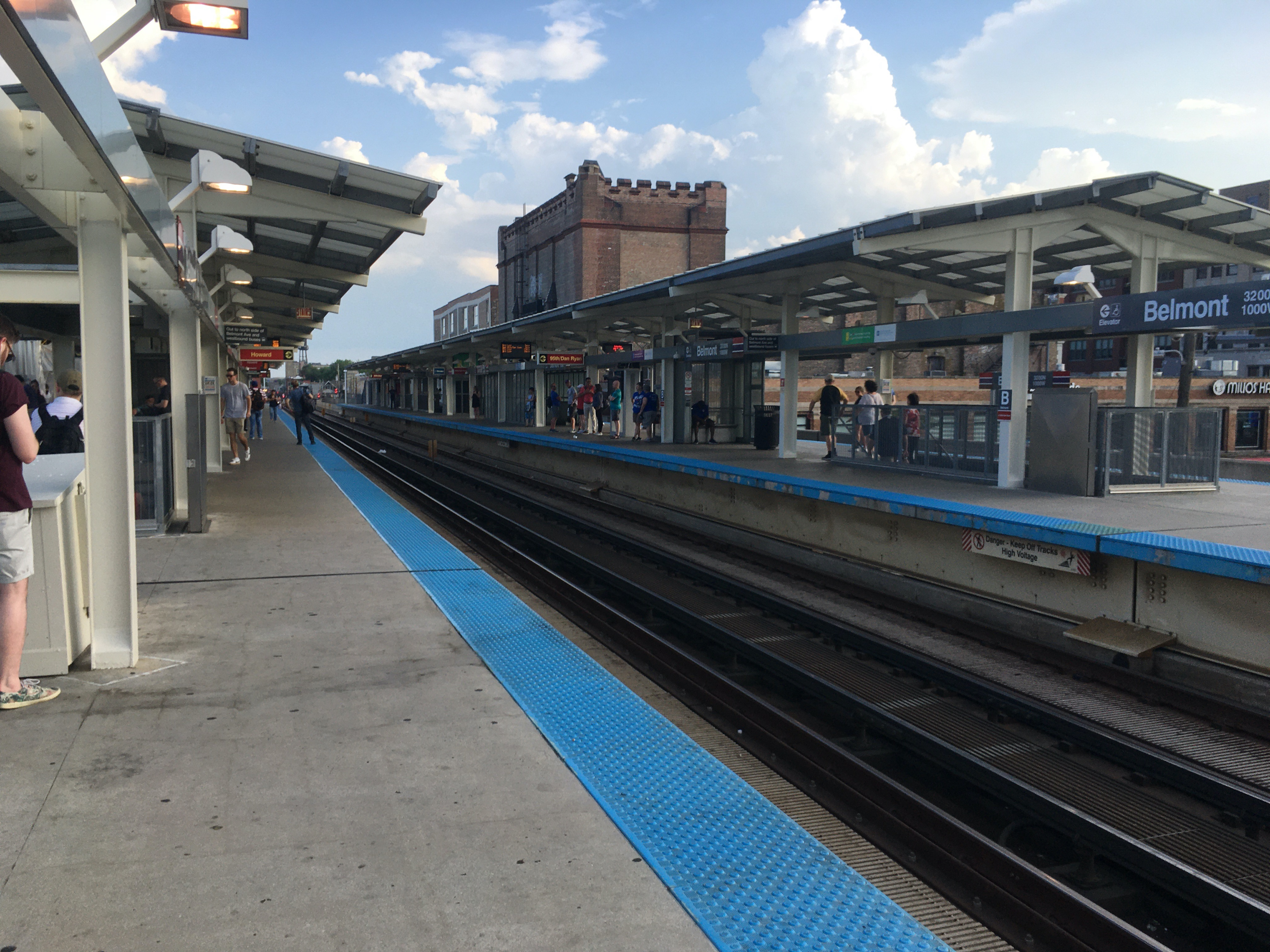
- The inner tracks used by the Red Line

General information
- Location: 945 West Belmont Avenue; Chicago, Illinois 60657
- Coordinates: 41.939562°N 87.653345°W
- Owner: Chicago Transit Authority
- Line: North Side Main Line
- Platforms: 2 island platforms
- Tracks: 4

Construction
- Structure type: Elevated
- Cycle facilities: Yes
- Accessible: Yes

History
- Opened: May 31, 1900; 126 years ago
- Rebuilt: 2006–2009; 17 years ago (station reconstruction)

Passengers
- 2025: 2,463,546 ▲7.1%

Services
Preceding station	Chicago "L"	Following station
Addison toward Howard	Red Line	Fullerton toward 95th/Dan Ryan
Wilson toward Linden	Purple Line Express	Wellington toward Loop (Clark/Lake)
Southport toward Kimball	Brown Line	Wellington toward Loop (Washington/Wells)
Former services
Preceding station	Chicago North Shore and Milwaukee Railroad	Following station
Wilson Avenue toward Milwaukee	North Shore Line	Chicago Avenue toward Roosevelt Road
Preceding station	Chicago "L"	Following station
Clark Closed 1949 toward Howard	North Side main line	Wellington toward Loop (Randolph/Wells) or North Water Terminal
Track layout
Location

Belmont is an 'L' station serving the CTA's North Side Main Line. It is served at all times by the Red and Brown Lines, and by the Purple Line Express during weekday rush hours. It is located at 945 West Belmont Avenue in the Lakeview neighborhood of Chicago, Illinois. It is an elevated station with two island platforms serving four tracks; Brown and Purple Line trains share the outer tracks while Red Line trains run on the inner tracks. Along with residential areas, the neighborhood surrounding Belmont contains many eclectic shops, bars, and restaurants and active nightlife. The station is one of the more heavily utilized on the system, serving as a busy transfer point. It is nearly identical to Fullerton.

== Location ==
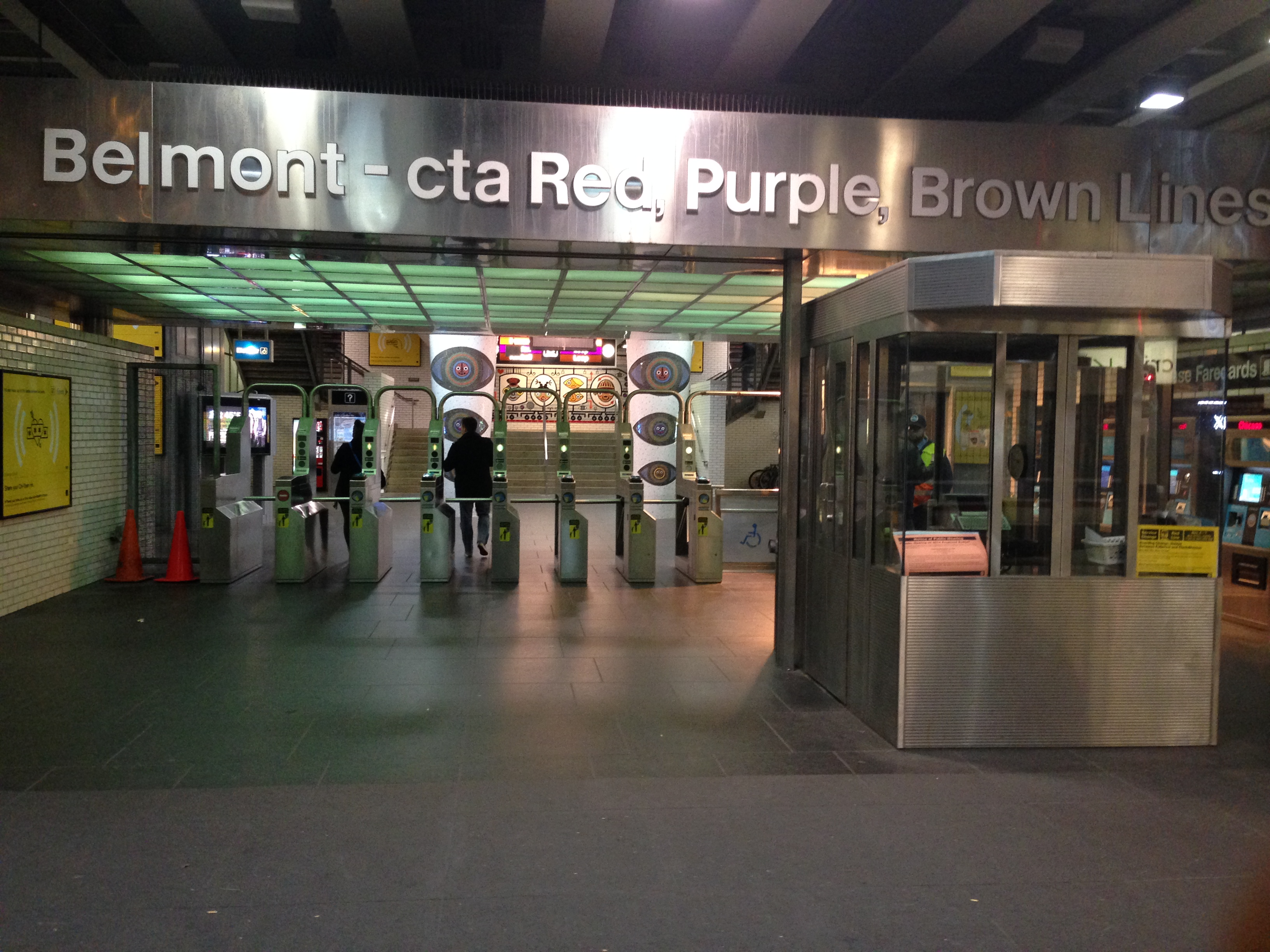
The station entrance from the sidewalk

Belmont is situated on West Belmont Avenue, close to its intersection with North Sheffield Avenue. The station is located in the Lakeview community area of Chicago; the area surrounding the station consists of a mixture of business and residential areas. The Vic Theater is less than half a block west on Sheffield Avenue.

== History ==
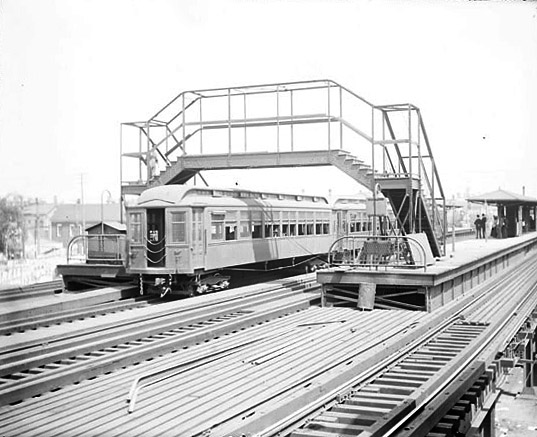
Belmont station as it appeared in 1907.

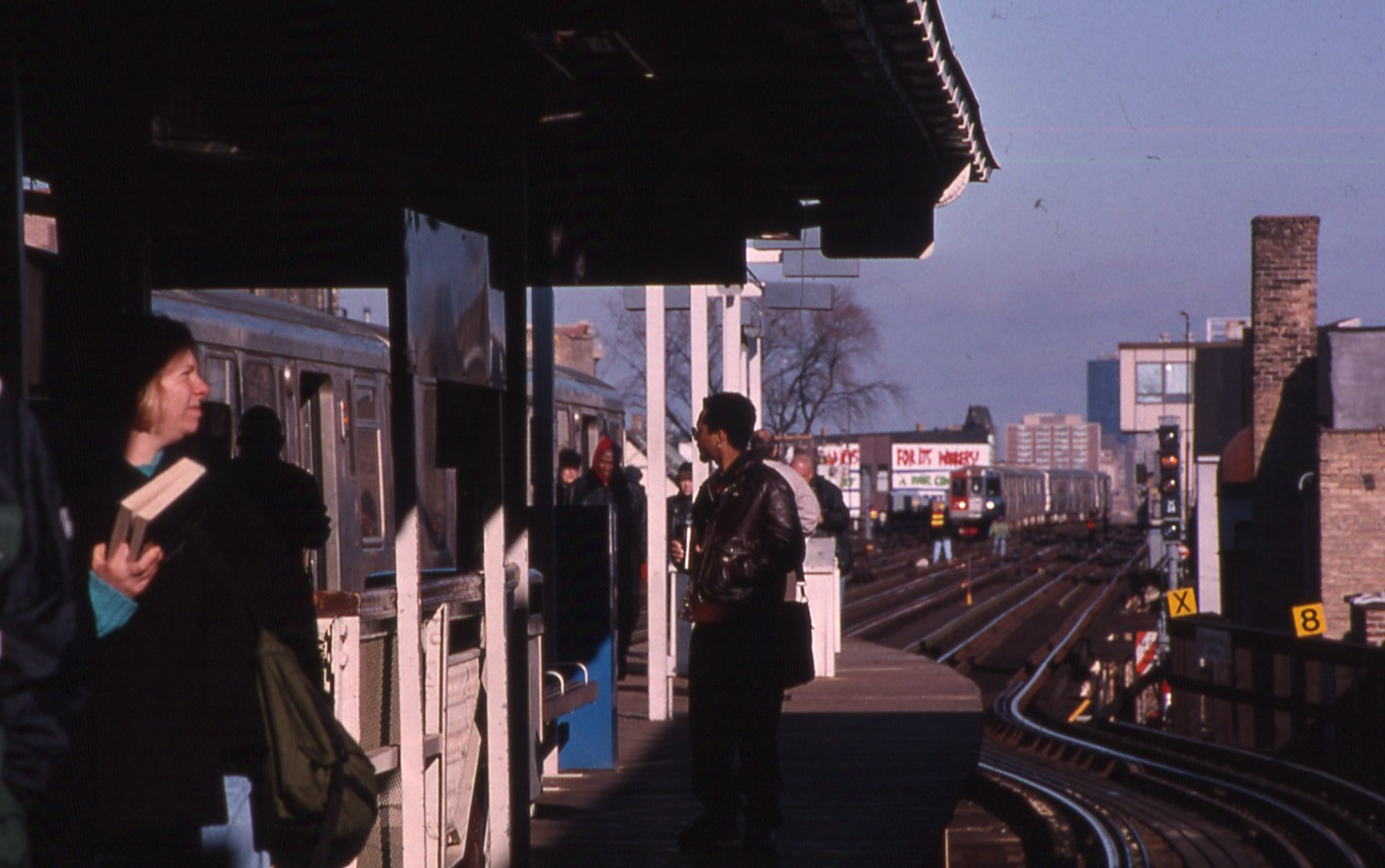
Station in 1999

Belmont station was constructed between 1896 and 1900 as part of the Northwestern Elevated Railroad, opening on May 31, 1900. The station had two island platforms elevated on a steel structure with tracks on either side. Following construction of the Ravenswood branch in 1907 (now part of today's Brown Line), a bridge was constructed connecting the two platforms to allow transfers from southbound services to northbound trains on the branch. The station house was located on the south side of Belmont and contained several turnstiles as well as a customer assistant booth. Beyond the turnstiles was a small caged area leading to stairs; the west staircase led to the southbound platform and the east staircase to the northbound platform. Prior to 1963 there was also a side platform on the west side of Track 1 (the westernmost track), which was used exclusively by the southbound trains of the Chicago North Shore and Milwaukee Railroad.

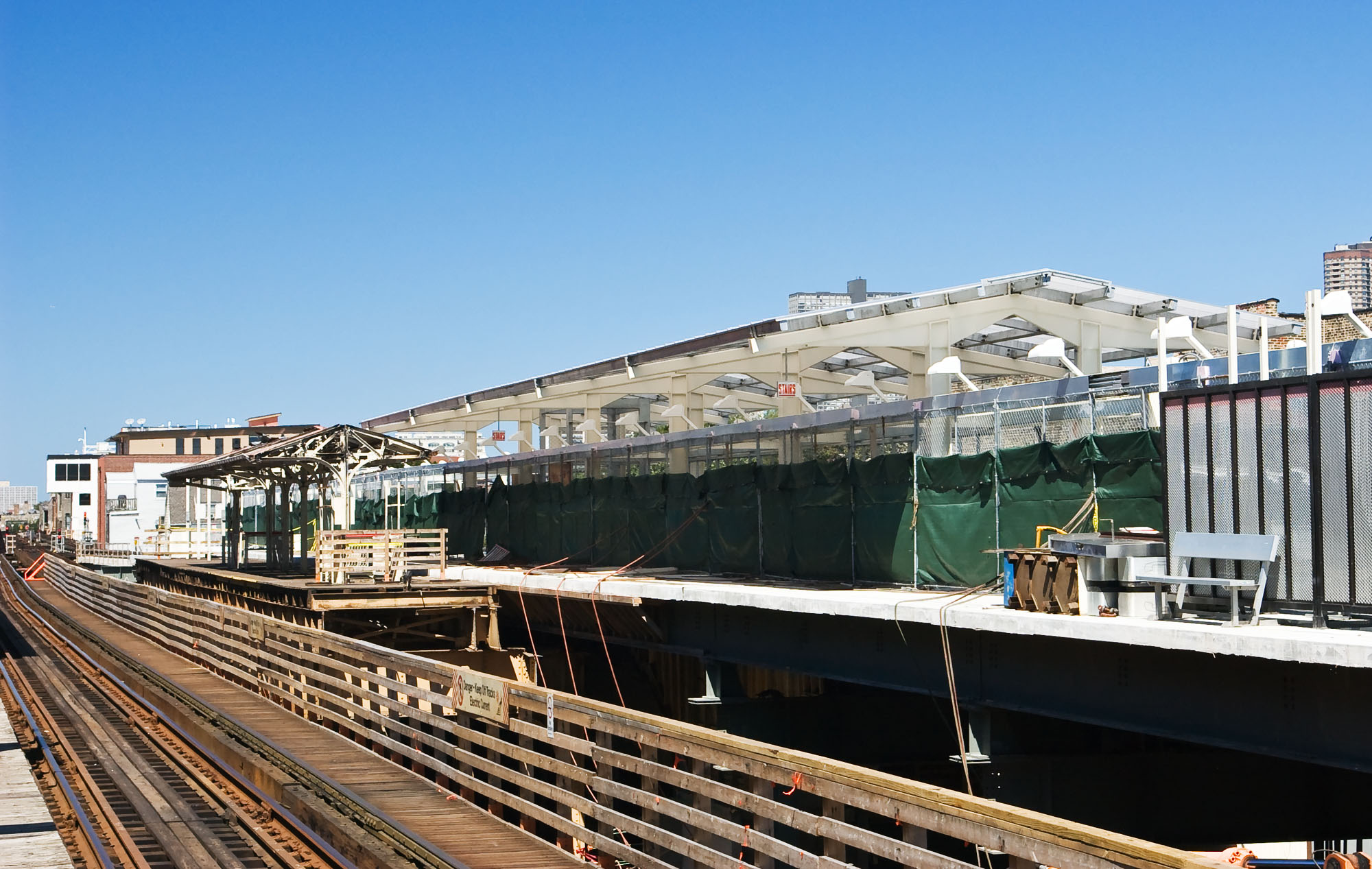
The northbound platform at Belmont station during reconstruction. Part of the original platform can be seen under demolition to the left while the new platform is constructed alongside it.

During 2006–2009, Belmont station underwent reconstruction as part of the Brown Line Capacity Expansion Project. The original station house was renovated and relocated to the north side of Belmont Avenue, the rest of the structure was demolished and a new station house and new wider platforms and canopies constructed. Elevators were installed to make the station accessible to those with disabilities. Because of its importance, the station remained open throughout the entire project unlike other stations which were temporarily closed for periods lasting from a few weekends to several months. During reconstruction the station was accessed from a temporary structure to the east of the original entry. The staging area and job offices for the project are located just north of the Belmont station.

Construction of support systems for the project and demolition of adjacent structures started in 2006, although this was not without controversy. Several businesses in the area were forcefully evicted so their property could be used for construction, leading to some ill-will towards the CTA amongst area residents.

Part of the staging for the reconstruction of the Belmont station required the temporary use of three tracks instead of the usual four. The Three-track operation concluded at Belmont on the morning of December 20, 2008. The project's Full Funding Grant Agreement with the federal government require that the CTA complete the project by the end of 2009. Elevators were placed into service on December 29, 2009 for customers with disabilities.

== Train services ==
Belmont is part of the CTA's Red, Brown and Purple Lines. Red Line trains serve Belmont 24/7. Brown Line trains serve Belmont between 4:00 a.m. and 2:20 a.m. Monday–Saturday, and between 5:00 a.m. and 2:00 a.m. on Sundays. Purple Line Express trains serve Belmont between 5:20 a.m. and 10:15 a.m. during the weekday morning rush hour, and between 2:30 p.m. and 7:15 p.m. during the weekday evening rush hour. Trains operate roughly every 3 to 10 minutes during rush hour, with longer headways of up to 15 minutes at night. 1,481,708 passengers boarded trains at Belmont in 2021.

== Bus connections ==
CTA

- 22 Clark (Owl Service)
- 77 Belmont (Owl Service)

The 77 Belmont stops at the station, and the 22 Clark stops close to the station on Clark Street.

== Gallery ==
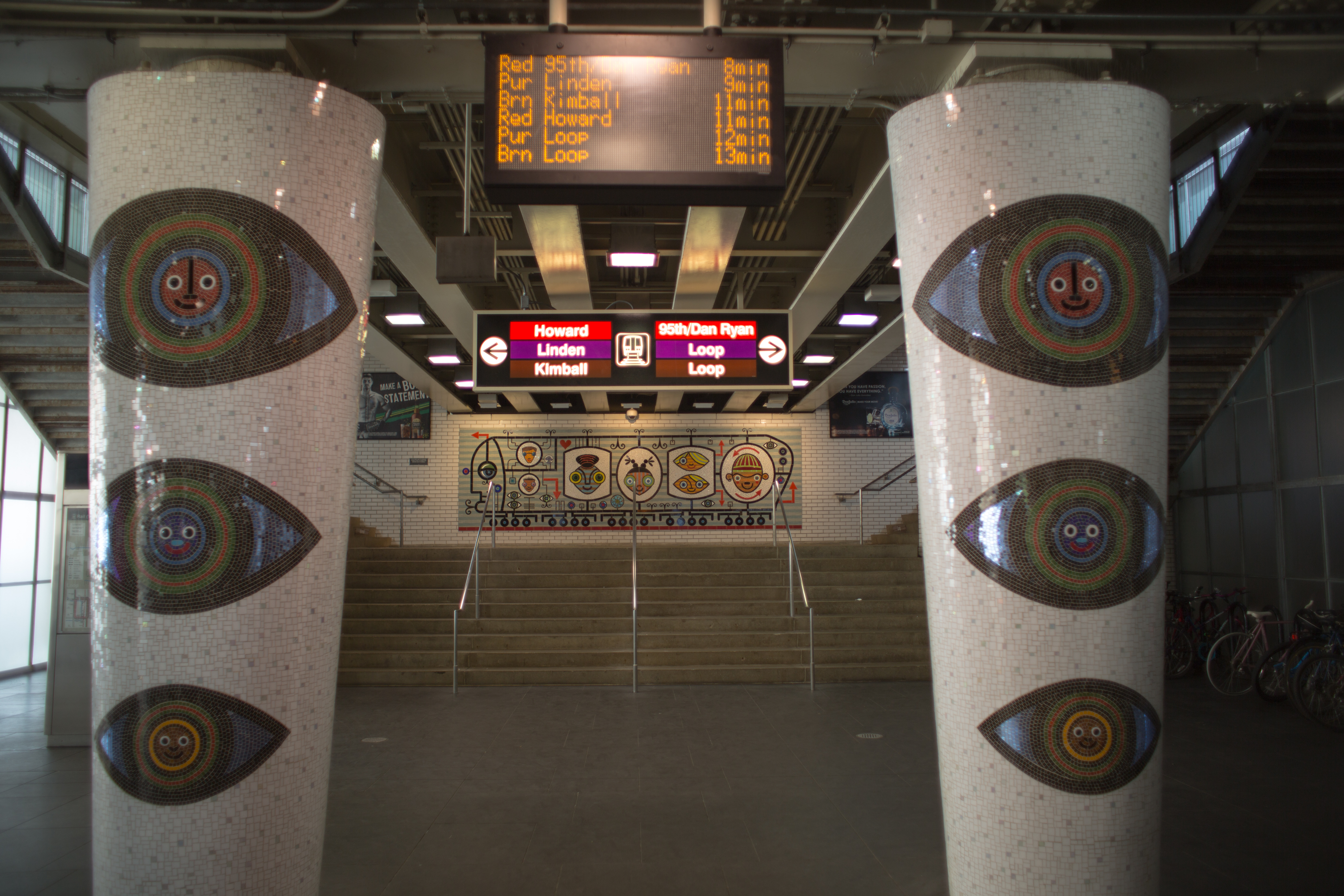
Interior tile work in the rebuilt station
