= Red Line Extension =

Rapid transit project in Chicago, Illinois

- Red Line Extension construction southeast of Michigan Avenue, October 2026
- Location: Chicago, Illinois, U.S.
- Proposer: Chicago Transit Authority
- Project website: www.transitchicago.com/rle/
- Status: Under construction
- Type: Rail rapid transit
- Cost estimate: $5.7 billion
- Start date: April 24, 2026; 6 months ago
- Completion date: 2030; 4 years' time
- Stakeholders: Walsh Group; Vinci Construction; Systra; EXP
- Geometry: 5.6 miles (9.0 km) long

The Red Line Extension (RLE) Project is an under-construction rapid transit project that is extending the Red Line, the most heavily-used Chicago "L" line, south from its current 95th/Dan Ryan terminus to the future 130th station. The project is being coordinated by the Chicago Transit Authority (CTA) as part of the Red Ahead program and is taking place in the Roseland, Washington Heights, West Pullman, and Riverdale community areas on the Far South Side of Chicago.

The extension project was conceived in 1958 as part of a then-proposed rapid transit line along the median of today's Dan Ryan Expressway, Interstate 57 (I-57), and the Bishop Ford Freeway (formerly the Calumet Expressway). However, only the section north of 95th Street along the Dan Ryan Expressway—the Dan Ryan branch—entered service in 1969. After that branch opened, there were various proposals to continue the line past 95th.

The passage of SAFETEA-LU, a transportation infrastructure funding bill, by the U.S. Congress in 2005 allowed federal funding from the Federal Transit Administration's (FTA) New Starts program to be earmarked for public transit projects like the Red Line Extension. The CTA finalized the alignment of the extension in 2018 along the rights-of-way of I-57, a Union Pacific Railroad line, and the South Shore Line.

The extension is 5.6 miles (9.0 km) long and is expected to cost $5.7 billion. Construction began in 2026 and is expected to conclude in 2030.

== Background ==
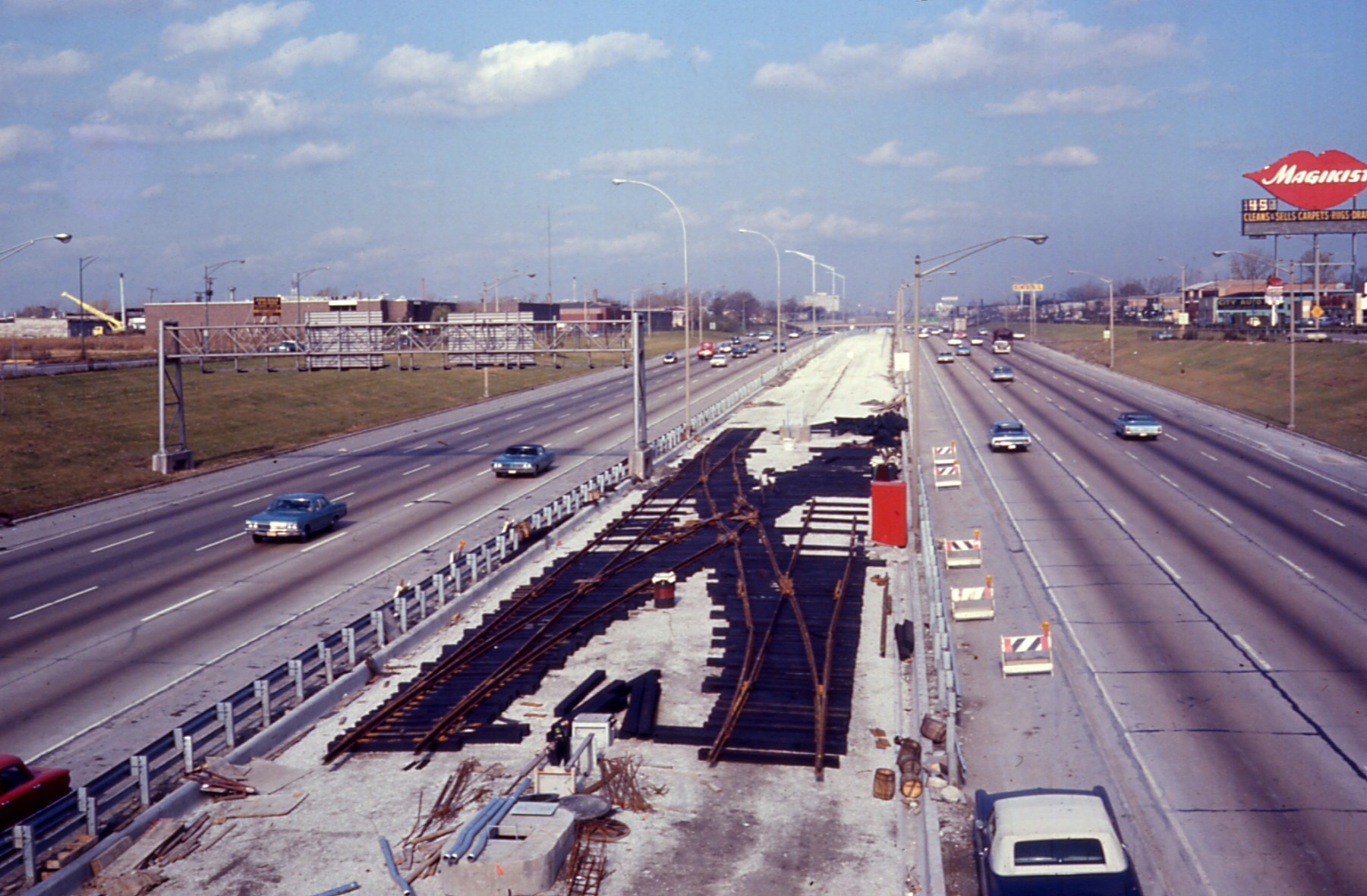
Dan Ryan branch under construction, 1968

Under the New Horizons program in 1958, the "South Side Rapid Transit" line was proposed to travel along the median of the then-proposed South Expressway from 30th to 95th streets. South of 95th Street, two branches were planned: an eastern branch to 103rd Street via the Calumet Expressway and a western branch to 119th Street via I-57. The South Expressway, later named the Dan Ryan Expressway, fully opened in 1962. However, the rapid transit line, named the Dan Ryan branch, did not open until September 28, 1969, and the line only went as far south as the 95th/Dan Ryan station.

== Planning ==
=== Early extension plans ===
Despite the Dan Ryan branch terminating at the 95th/Dan Ryan station, proposals to extend the branch further south have persisted for many decades.

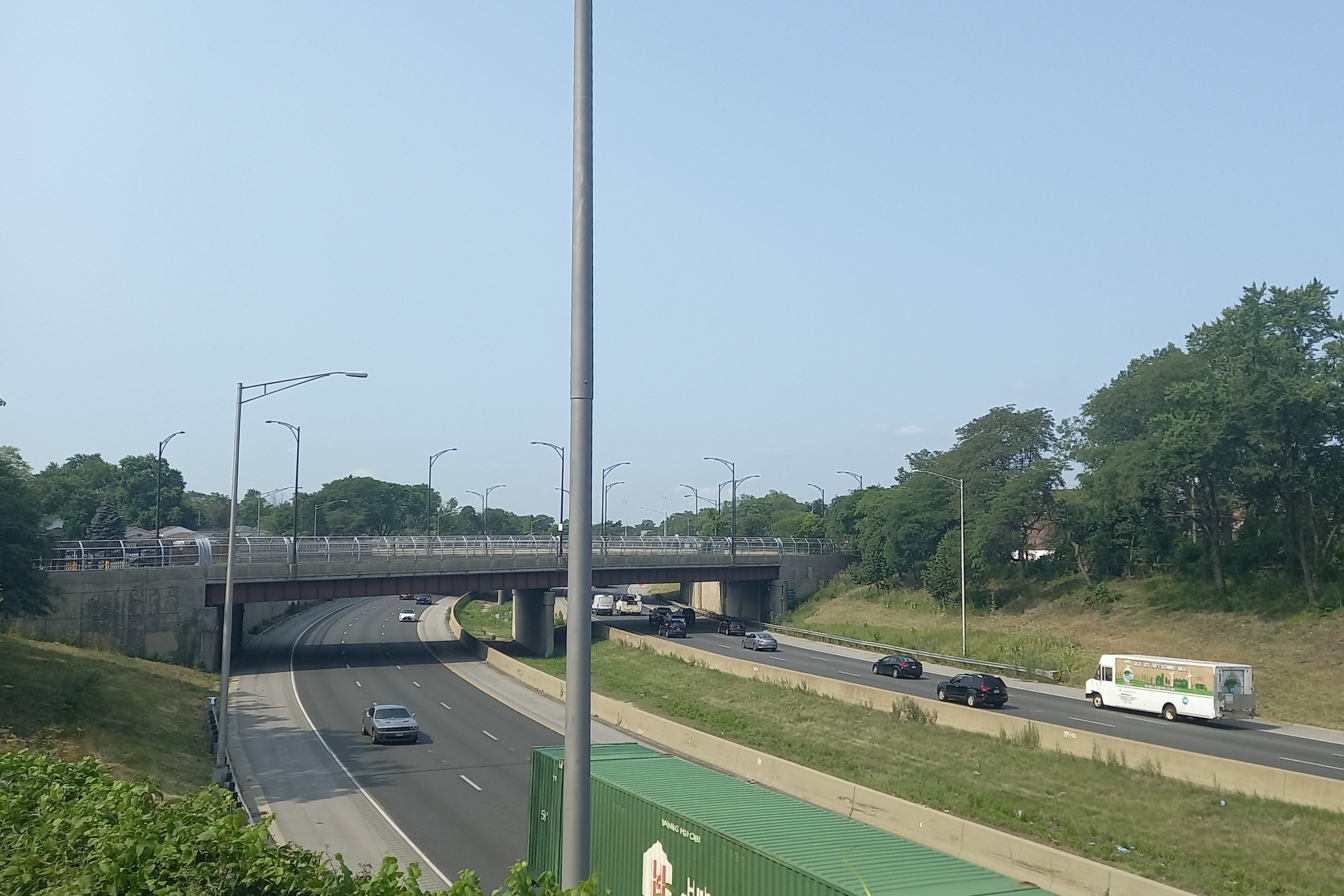
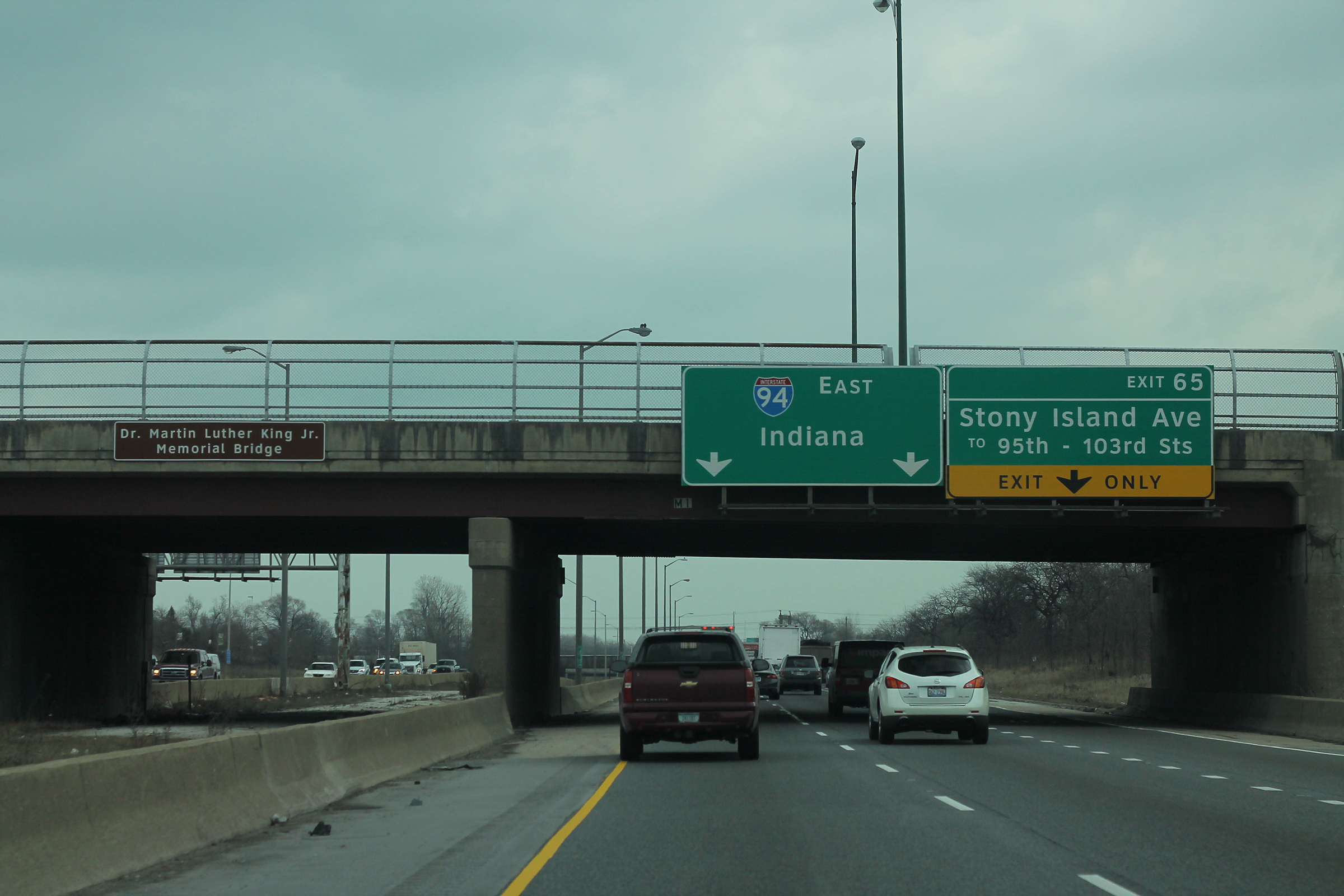
I-57 (left) and the Bishop Ford Freeway (right) have wide medians that were intended to accommodate the proposed extension under the New Horizons program.

In accordance with the New Horizons program, the extension was originally proposed to split and run along two expressways: I-57 and the Calumet Expressway. Because the "L" utilized skip-stop service at the time of the New Horizons, the Calumet Expressway route and the I-57 route were designated for "A" and "B" trains, respectively.

The extension concept was carried over in many subsequent development plans. In the 1995 Transportation System Plan (1973) and the Year 2000 Transportation System Development Plan (1980), the Calumet Expressway route remained unchanged under both plans, but the I-57 route was extended from 119th Street to Vermont Street in Blue Island, Illinois, via the Blue Island branch of the Illinois Central Gulf Railroad (ICG); the ICG branch is now part of the Metra Electric District. Subsequent plans beginning with the 2010 Transportation System Development Plan (1990) no longer listed the extension to Blue Island. The 2020 Regional Transportation Plan (1998) extended the extension alignment to 130th Street via the Bishop Ford Freeway; the Calumet Expressway was renamed for Bishop Louis Henry Ford earlier in 1996.

=== 21st century ===
In 2004, with the support from the Developing Communities Project within the past few years, a non-binding advisory referendum in favor of the Red Line Extension was passed by 39,000 voters (98% of voters) in the 9th and 34th wards.

After the federal SAFETEA-LU was signed into law in August 2005, the New Starts funding from the Federal Transit Administration (FTA) was earmarked for public transit projects, including the Red Line Extension. In order to receive New Starts funding, the project required alternatives analysis, environmental impact statement, preliminary engineering, final design, and construction.

In 2006, the alternatives analysis began with a $3.5 million contract awarded to Parsons Brinckerhoff. The CTA considered nine proposed routes along the following corridors: I-57, Halsted Street, the Union Pacific Railroad tracks, Wentworth Avenue, State Street, Michigan Avenue, King Drive, Cottage Grove Avenue/Metra Electric District, and I-94 (Bishop Ford Freeway). In a public meeting hosted on April 10–11, 2007, the CTA reduced the number of potential alignments to three potential corridors: Halsted Street, a Union Pacific line, and Michigan Avenue. Additionally, the CTA explored whether to implement rail rapid transit or bus rapid transit (BRT). In another public meeting in December 2008, extension options were further reduced to either Halsted Street (BRT or elevated rapid transit) or the Union Pacific line (elevated rapid transit). Alternatives analysis concluded in August 2009, with the CTA adopting an elevated rapid transit line via the Union Pacific corridor as the Locally Preferred Alternative (LPA).

The CTA began drafting the project's environmental impact statement (EIS) after selecting an LPA. In 2011, the CTA received federal funding from the FTA for environmental studies. The draft EIS was published on October 6, 2016. At this time, the CTA had two options for the alignment of the extension: west or east of the Union Pacific tracks.

On January 26, 2018, the CTA finalized the extension. The extension will be 5.3 miles (8.5 km) long and comprise four new stations: 103rd, 111th, Michigan, and 130th. Along the Union Pacific corridor, the extension will run west of the tracks between I-57 and 109th Street and then east of the tracks between 109th Street and the Metra Electric line. The extension will also parallel I-57 between 95th Street and the Union Pacific tracks as well as the South Shore Line between the Metra Electric line and 130th Street.

On February 10, 2020, the CTA approved a $38.3 million contract with T. Y. Lin International to complete the Final EIS and preliminary engineering of the Red Line Extension. In August 2022, the CTA was given a Record of Decision for the extension project after completing the Final EIS. In December 2022, the Chicago City Council approved the creation of a tax-increment financing (TIF) district spanning from Madison Street to Pershing Road. The TIF district will send nearly $1 billion in tax revenue over the next few decades to fund the extension. The next year, the federal government promised to commit $2 billion to the extension project. President Joe Biden's proposed 2024 budget, released in March 2024, included $350 million in federal funding for the extension project. On August 14, 2024, the CTA awarded a $2.9 billion contract to Walsh-VINCI Transit Community Partners, a joint organization comprising Walsh Group, Vinci Construction, EXP, Systra, and other contractors.

On January 10, 2025, 10 days before the second inauguration of Donald Trump, the outgoing Biden administration signed a full funding grant agreement with the CTA. The agreement confirmed a $1.97 billion grant for the project, which future administrations could not legally claw back.

That October, at the start of the 2025 United States federal government shutdown, Office of Management and Budget director Russell Vought withheld a combined $2.1 billion for the Red Line Extension and the Red and Purple Modernization Project, citing reports of diversity, equity, and inclusion practices that he described as "unconstitutional". In response, Mayor Brandon Johnson considered suing the federal government to unfreeze the funds. On March 20, 2026, the CTA sued the United States Department of Transportation (USDOT) and the FTA to reverse the cut. Four days later, federal funding was restored after a ruling from U.S. District Judge Thomas M. Durkin declared that the funding cut was not permitted. Groundbreaking ceremony for the extension occurred on April 24, 2026.

== Construction ==
As of the time the draft EIS was published in 2016, construction was originally slated to occur between 2022 and 2026 at the earliest, with the project costing $2.3 billion. However, future construction was delayed to between April 24, 2026, and 2030. Additionally, the length of the extension slightly increased to 5.6 miles (9.0 km), and the project cost soared to $5.7 billion. Building demolition and utility relocation are currently underway.
