= Red Line (CTA) =

Chicago "L" rapid transit line

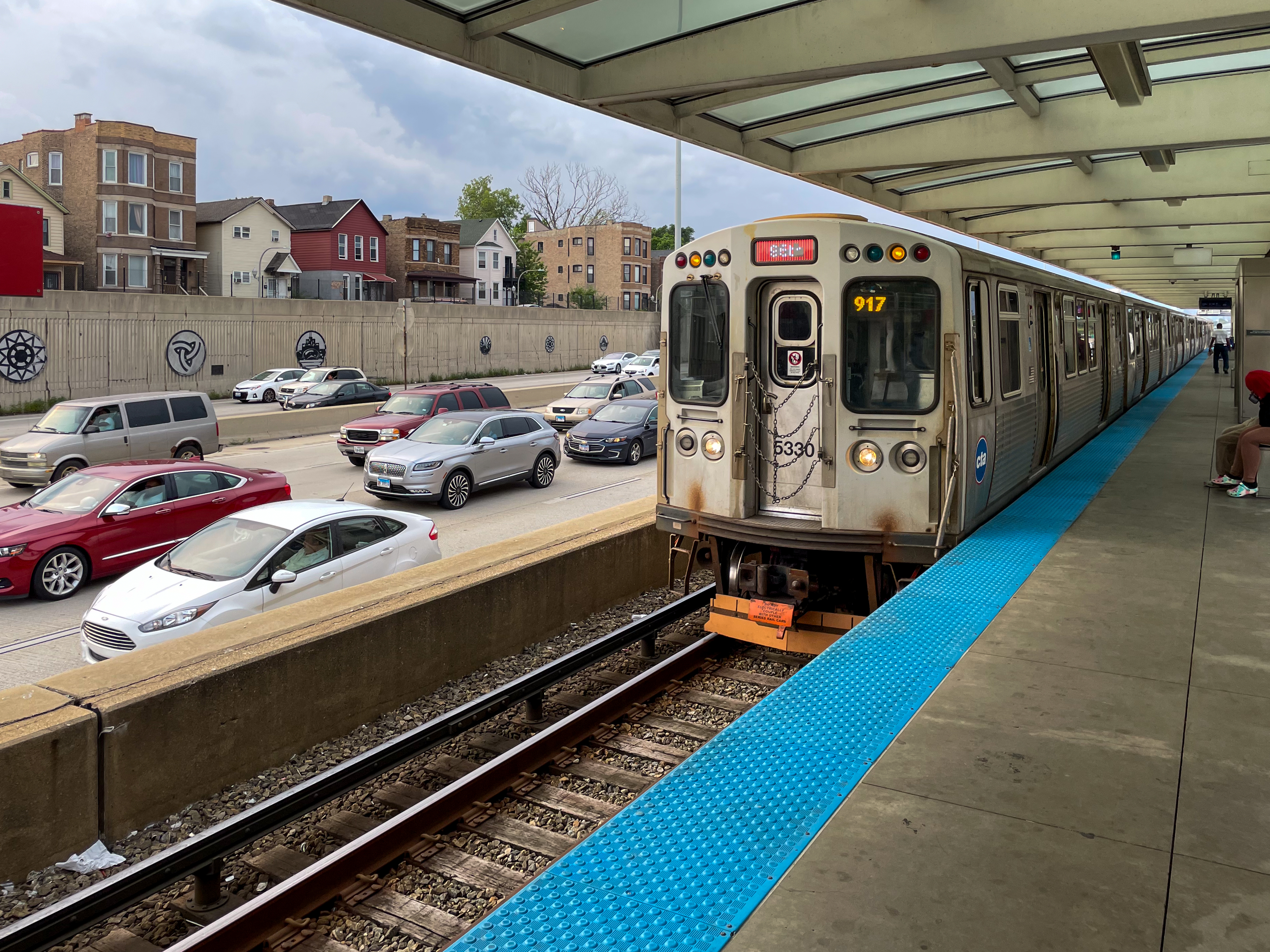
- A Red Line train of 5000-series cars at Garfield station

Overview
- Status: Operational
- Locale: Chicago, Illinois, United States
- Termini: Howard; 95th/Dan Ryan
- Stations: 33 (4 under construction)

Service
- Type: Rapid transit
- System: Chicago "L"
- Operator: Chicago Transit Authority
- Depot(s): Howard Yard, 98th Yard
- Rolling stock: 5000-series 8-car trains (typical, maximum)
- Daily ridership: 114,598 (avg. weekday 2024)

History
- Opened: Oldest section: May 31, 1900; 126 years ago Current operation: February 21, 1993; 33 years ago

Technical
- Line length: 21.8 mi (35.1 km) (5.6 mi (9.0 km) under construction)
- Character: Embankment, elevated, subway, and expressway median
- Track gauge: 4 ft 8 1/2 in (1,435 mm) standard gauge
- Electrification: Third rail, 600 V DC
Route map
Red Line highlighted in red
- Bus connections at all stations except Jarvis.

The Red Line is a rapid transit line in Chicago, run by the Chicago Transit Authority (CTA) as part of the Chicago "L" system. It is the busiest line on the "L" system, with nearly 40 million rides in 2024.

The route is 21.8 miles (35.1 km) long with a total of 33 stations. It runs elevated from the Howard station in the Rogers Park neighborhood on the North Side, through the State Street subway on the Near North Side, Downtown, and the South Loop, and then through the Dan Ryan Expressway median to 95th/Dan Ryan in the Roseland neighborhood on the South Side.

Together with the Blue Line, the Red Line runs 24 hours a day, 365 days a year, making Chicago, New York City, and Copenhagen, the only three cities in the world that operate train service 24 hours a day throughout their city limits.

The CTA is currently building an extension of the Red Line, adding 5.6 miles (9.0 km) and four new stations which would extend the line from 95th Street to 130th Street, making the Red Line approximately 27.3 miles in length with 37 stations. In December 2022, the Chicago City Council approved the creation of a district that will send approximately $1 billion in tax revenue for the extension of the Red Line south of 95th Street to 130th Street.

== Route ==
=== North Side Main Line ===
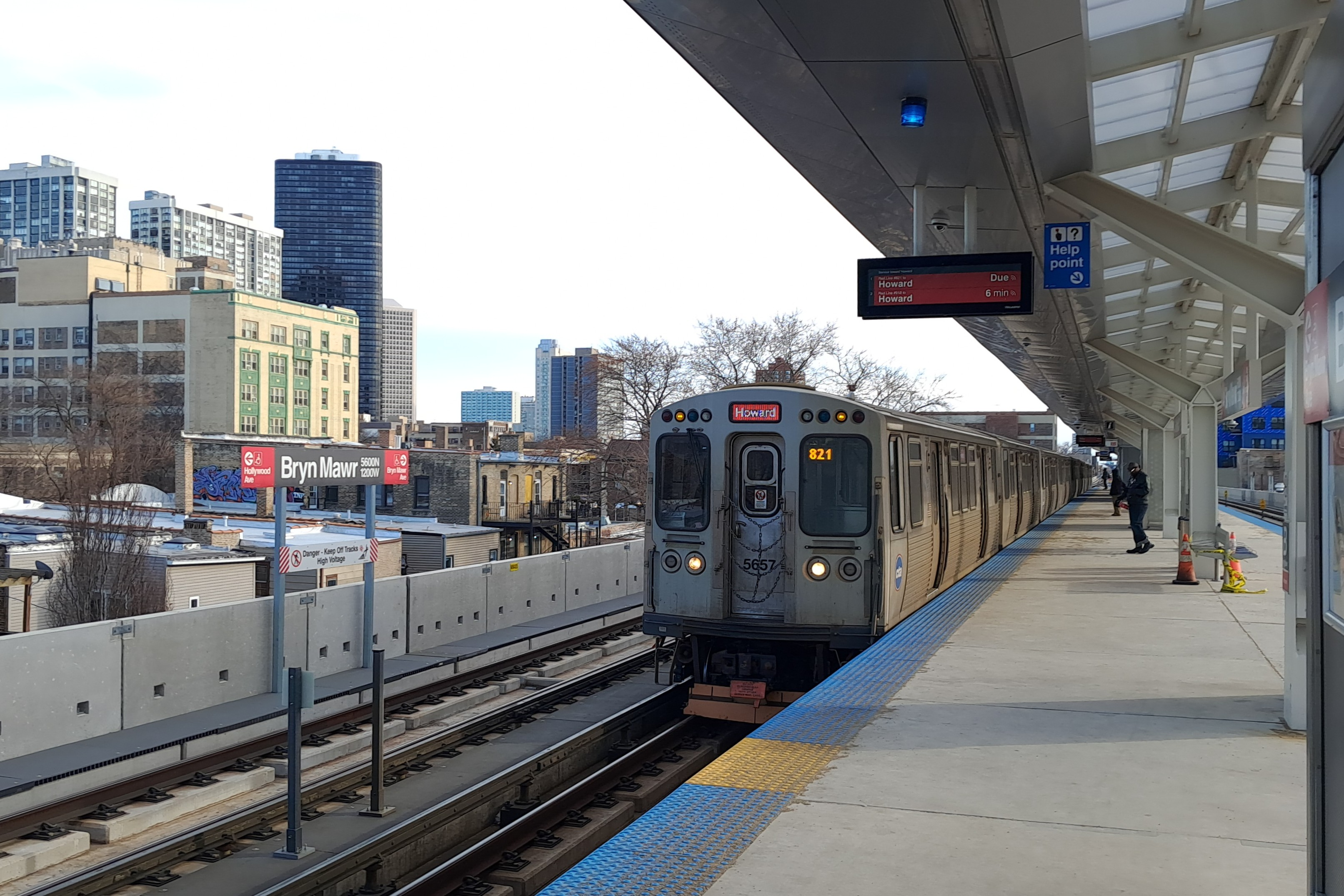
Bryn Mawr station on the North Side main line

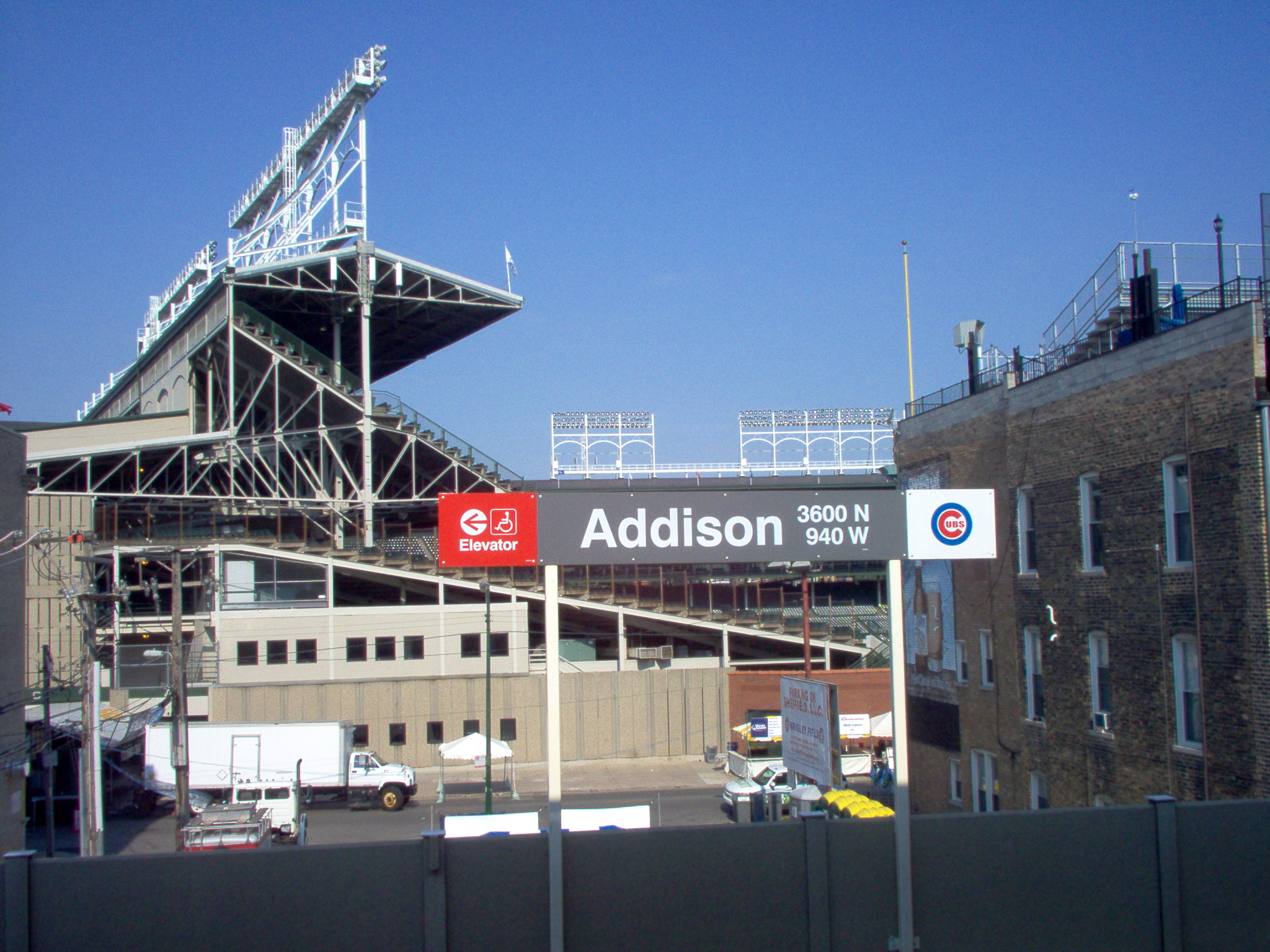
Addison station with Wrigley Field in the background

The northern terminus of the Red Line is Howard in the Rogers Park neighborhood of Chicago, on the north side. From there, the Red Line extends southeasterly on an elevated embankment structure about a half-mile west of the lakefront to Touhy Avenue, then turns south along Glenwood Avenue to Morse station.

From Morse the route swings on a sweeping reverse curve toward the southeast, crossing West Sheridan Road near Loyola University Chicago, then continues south, running parallel to and east of Broadway (in Edgewater), to Leland Avenue. From there, the route transitions from concrete embankment to steel elevated structure. The "L" continues southward, running adjacent Graceland Cemetery to Irving Park Road, then along Sheffield Avenue to Lincoln Park. The Brown Line (Ravenswood), joins the Red Line just north of Belmont.

Red, Brown and Purple Line Express trains run side-by-side on the four-track North Side "L" from Belmont to just south of Armitage Avenue. Along this stretch, Red Line trains run on the two middle tracks, stopping only at Belmont and Fullerton while skipping Wellington, Diversey and Armitage.

Wrigley Field, home of the Chicago Cubs, is served by the Addison station, while Rate Field, home of the Chicago White Sox, is served by the Sox–35th station.

The North Side Main Line of the Red Line runs from Howard Avenue to Armitage Avenue.

=== State Street subway ===
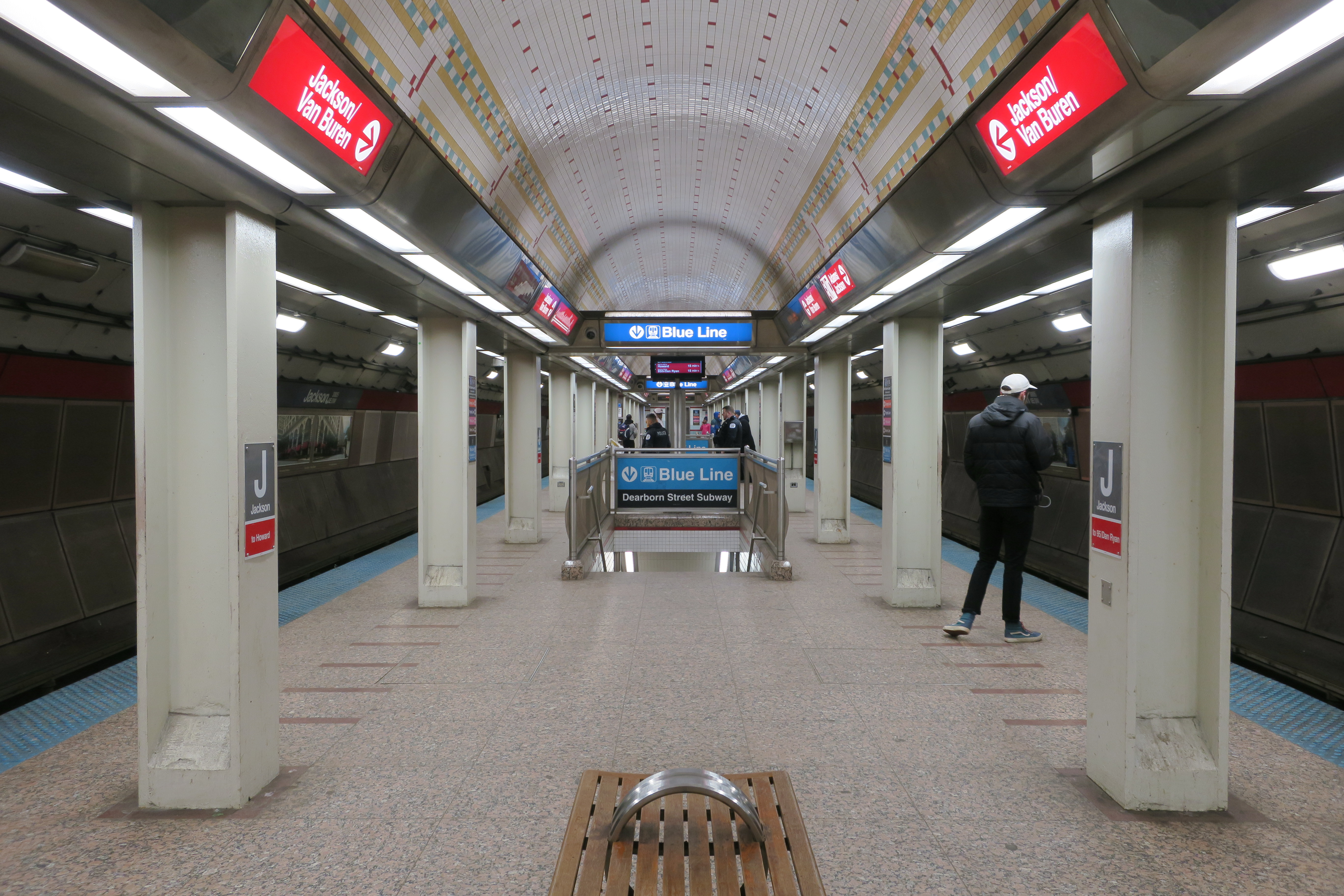
Red Line platform at Jackson in the State Street subway

After crossing Armitage Avenue, the Red Line descends to a portal north of Willow Street and enters the subway, turning southeast on Clybourn Avenue, then east at Division Street, and south at State Street, continuing on State through the Loop to Roosevelt Road. South of Roosevelt Road there is a junction with a pair of tracks curving to the east and leaving the subway at 13th Street, then connecting to the old South Side "L" at 18th and State Streets. This section was used from October 1943 until February 1993, when trains from Howard were routed to the Englewood and Jackson Park branches, known today as the south branches of the Green Line.

The 13th Street portal is now used for non-service train moves and for emergencies. The 13th Street portal was used again for regular "L" service from May until October 2013 — the five months of the Red Line South Reconstruction Project — during which Red Line trains were rerouted to the Green Line's South Side Main Line tracks and terminated at Ashland/63rd. It was again used from April to November 2017 and from July 2018 to April 2019.

The Red Line is the only Chicago "L" line that connects to all seven other "L" lines full time. (The Purple Line shares the distinction only when it runs its weekday rush-hour route; no other lines have direct connections to the Yellow Line.)

=== Dan Ryan branch ===
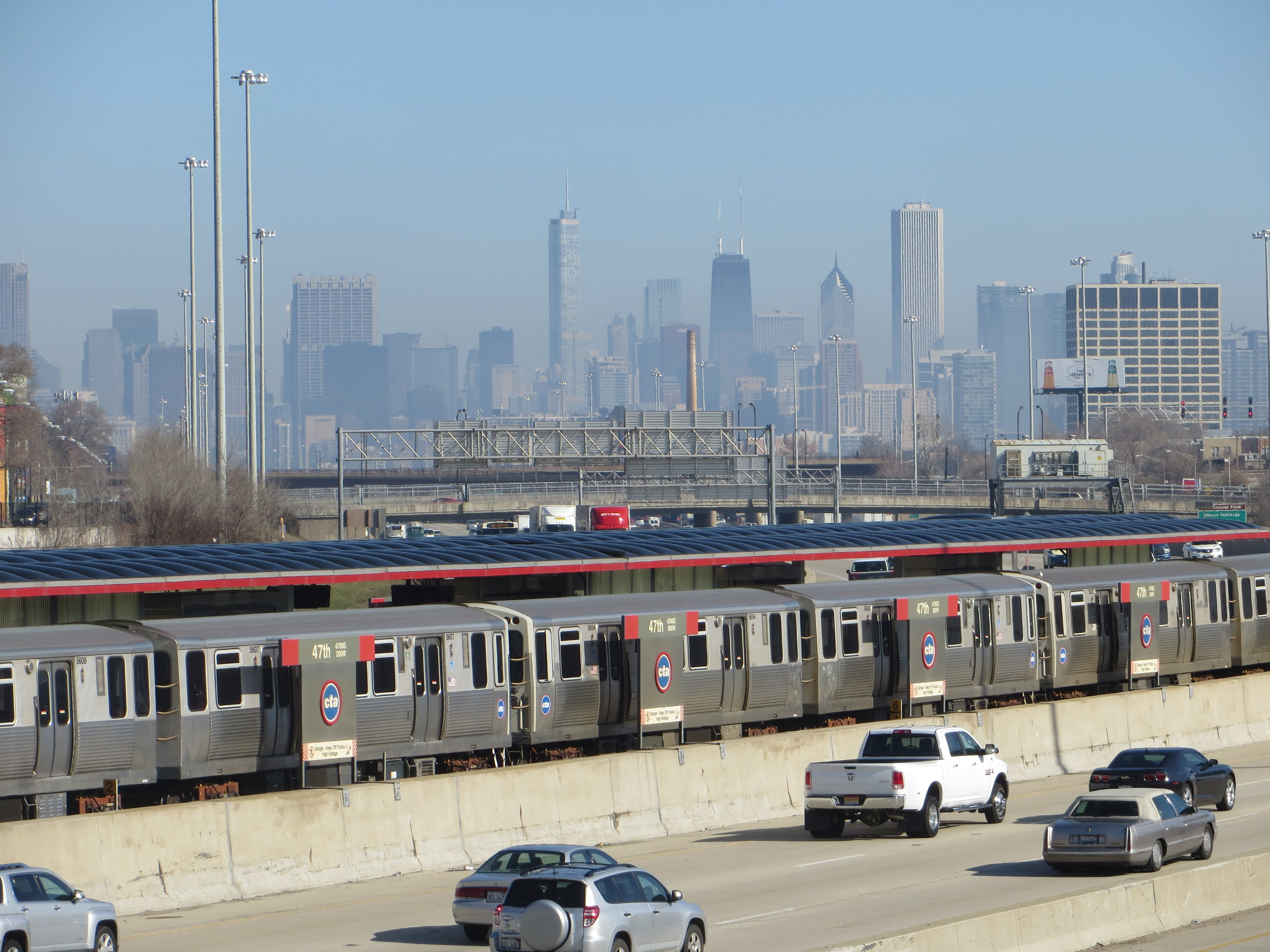
Red Line train at 47th station

At 13th Street, the subway swings away from State Street on a reverse curve to the southwest then rises to another portal at 16th Street adjacent Metra's Rock Island District line. The Red Line leaves at 16th Street and continues southward on an elevated structure to 24th Street. There is a stop at Cermak–Chinatown on this portion.

South of Cermak Road, the Red Line tracks enter the median strip of the Franklin Street Connector, The Red Line then tunnels beneath the expressway interchange between 28th and 30th Streets and continues the rest of the way to 95th Street in the median of the Dan Ryan Expressway (Interstate 90 & 94). Chicago pioneered using expressway medians for local "L" train lines (the other two being the Eisenhower Expressway and Kennedy Expressway, which both carry portions of the Blue Line). The Red Line follows the Dan Ryan the rest of the way to the 95th/Dan Ryan terminal in Roseland.

The 98th Yard lies just south and east of the Dan Ryan–Bishop Ford Freeway interchange. Beyond the interchange, the Dan Ryan Expressway and Bishop Ford Freeway both continue towards the south city limits without a transit line in the median strips, but were built with wide grass medians in which future extensions of the rapid transit line remain an option. An extension to 130th Street is now under construction. This extension includes three elevated stations at 103rd, 111th, and Michigan, an at-grade terminal station at 130th, with a new Rail Yard facility at 120th Street.

Stations along the Red Line serve important Chicago landmarks such as Rate Field and the Illinois Institute of Technology (Sox–35th), DePaul University (Fullerton), the Auditorium Building of Roosevelt University (Jackson) and Loyola University Chicago (Loyola), as well as the Magnificent Mile (Chicago), Navy Pier (Grand), Museum Campus (Roosevelt), and Chinatown (Cermak–Chinatown).

In May 2013, the branch, along with all nine stations, closed for five months to allow the replacement of the tracks and for construction crews to improve the stations on the branch. The newly reconstructed Dan Ryan branch and the nine stations reopened in October 2013.

== Rolling stock ==
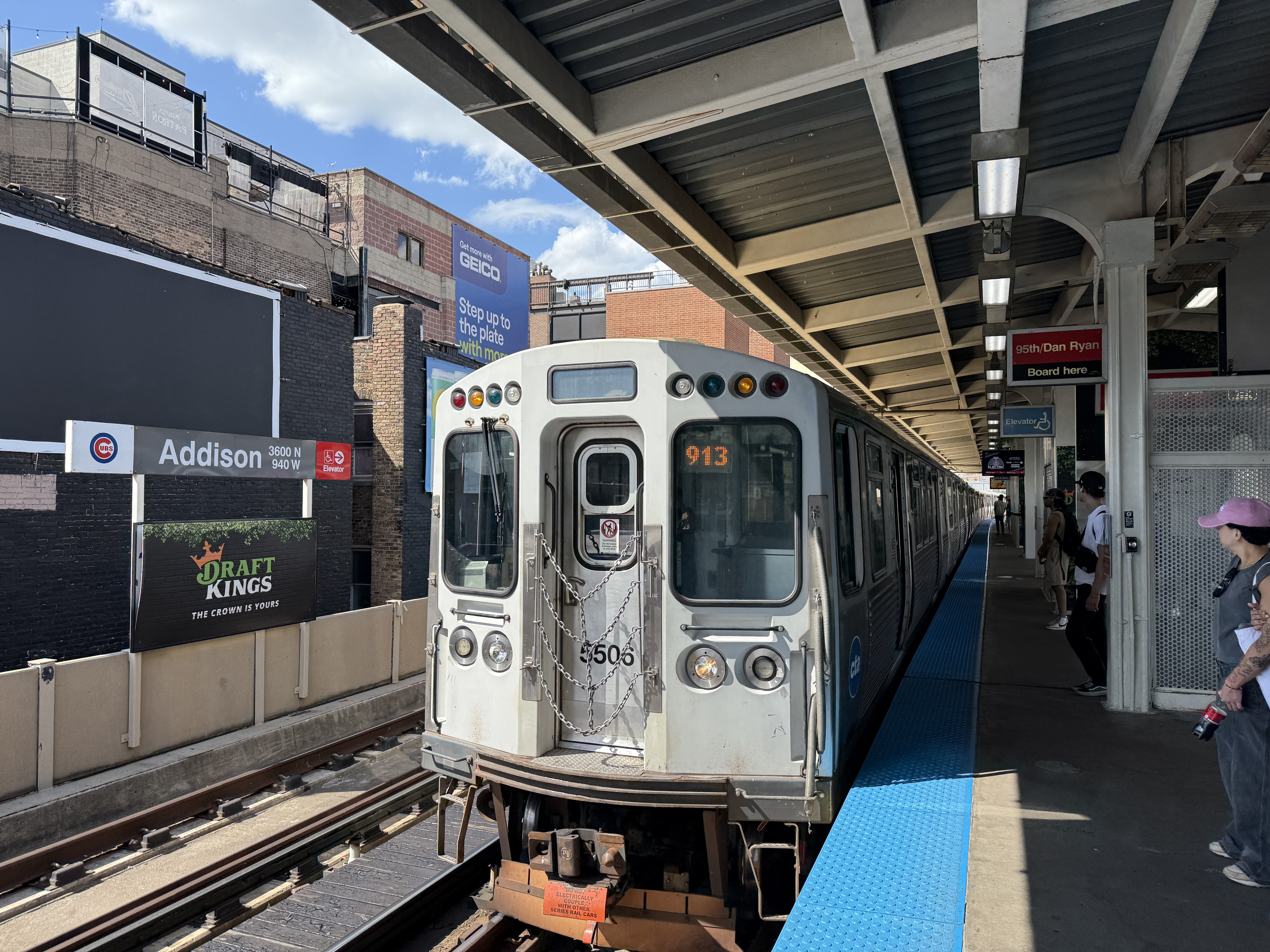
Red Line train made up of 5000-series cars at Addison station

The Red Line is operated with the Bombardier-built 5000-series railcars. From 2012 until October 2013, the Red Line was operated with the 2400-series cars, during weekday rush hours, and from 1993 until 2015, the Red Line was operated with the 2600-series cars. As the 5000-series cars were delivered, the Red Line's 2600-series cars were transferred to other lines to replace the 2400-series cars. From October 2013 until April 2014, several of the Red Line's 2600-series cars were transferred over to the Purple Line as they were displaced on the Red Line by the 5000-series cars.

Beginning in June 2014, CTA began to transfer the 2600-series cars from the Red Line over to the Blue Line due to them being newer than the existing Blue Line cars. The Blue Line's older 2600-series cars were transferred to the Orange as an interim replacement for its 2400-series cars. Beginning in October 2014, CTA started transferring some of the Red Line's 2600-series cars to the Orange Line, replacing the Orange Line's remaining 2400-series cars until the Red Line was fully equipped with the 5000-series cars.

== Operating hours and headways ==
Like the Blue Line, the Red Line runs 24 hours a day. On weekdays, service runs very frequently at 30 tph (trains per hour) during rush hour, and 8 tph during the midday and nighttime. On Saturdays, 6 tph in the early morning, then increase to 10–11 tph during the day, then 8 tph at night. On Sundays, service runs 6 tph early morning, then increases to 8tph all day into early evening, 6 tph later at night. Between approximately midnight and 5:30 a.m., night owl service on the Red Line ranges between ten and fifteen minutes (4–6 tph).

== History ==
The Howard–Englewood–Jackson Park Line highlighted in gray

The oldest section of the line opened on May 31, 1900, running from the Loop to Wilson. It was constructed by the Northwestern Elevated Railroad. The route was extended to Central Street in Evanston on May 16, 1908, via leased and electrified trackage belonging to the Chicago, Milwaukee and St. Paul Railway. In November 1913, the North Side "L" was through routed with the South Side "L" lines through the Loop. The ground-level section between Leland Avenue and Howard Street was elevated on a concrete embankment structure and widened to four tracks in 1922.

The State Street subway opened on October 17, 1943, providing two new tracks bypassing the Loop tracks and the portion of the North and South Side "L" lines not equipped with express tracks. By providing an express route free of the most restrictive curves on the Chicago "L" and shorter than the old line it supplemented, the subway reduced running time by as much as eleven minutes for a one-way trip. The route was placed in operation on October 17, 1943, for a portion of the through north–south trains, although other trains continued to use the "L" both on through trips and on services circling the Loop and returning to the point of origin.

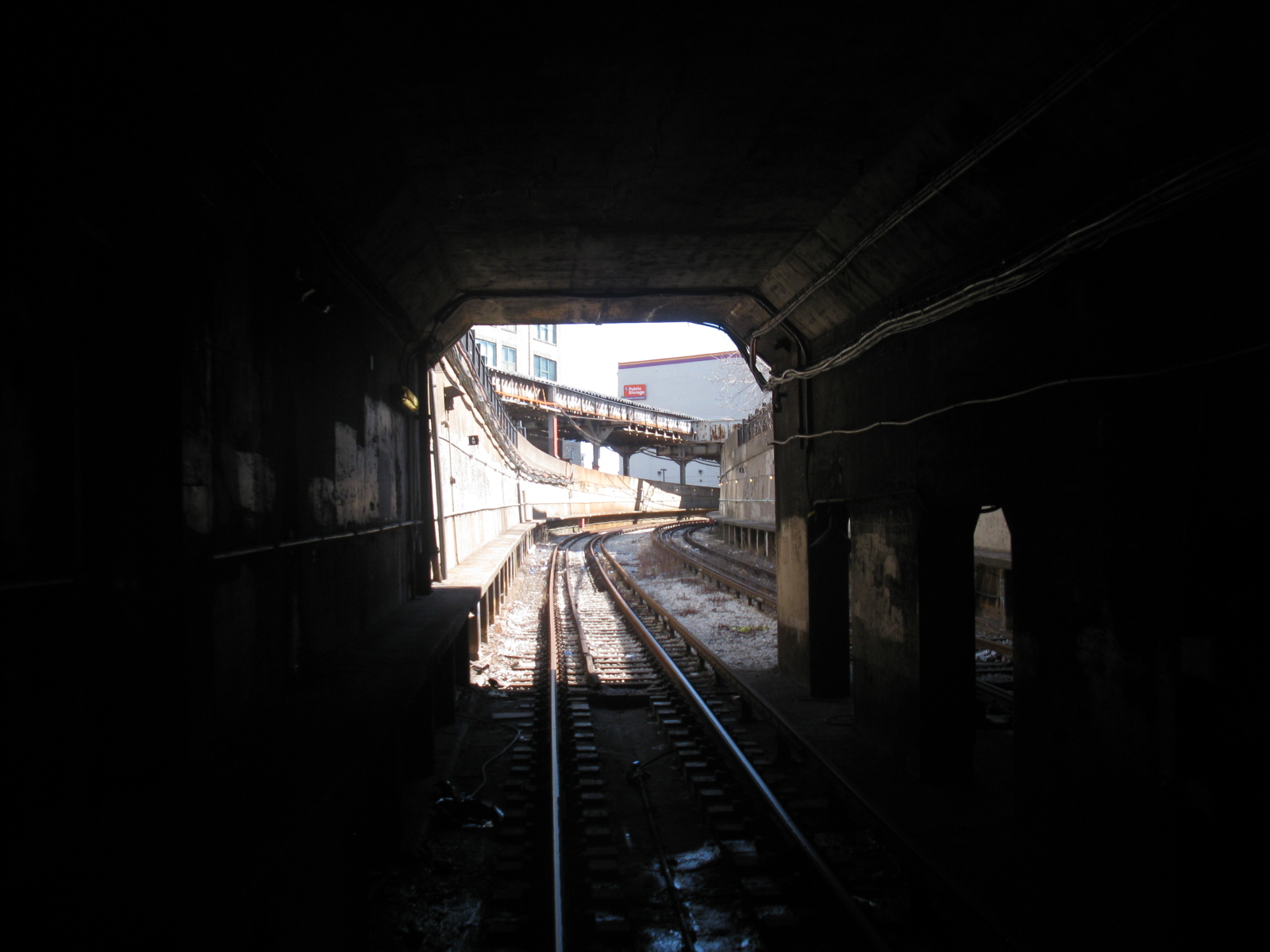
The 13th Street incline saw regular service until 1993.

In August 1949, the North–South route was revised to create a more efficient routing through the Loop and handle the heavy volumes of passenger traffic using it. The Howard branch was paired with the Englewood and Jackson Park branches through the State Street subway, using the 13th Street portal and the other lines routed to the Loop "L".

The Dan Ryan Branch opened in September 1969, and was paired with the Lake Street branch to form the West-South route, almost universally referred to as the Lake–Dan Ryan route. It operated over the Lake Street and Wabash Avenue sides of the Union Loop. This "interim" service was created mainly for the purpose of providing through service between the West Side and the South Side in anticipation of the 1968 Loop Subway Project. When the controversial subway project was cancelled in 1979, the Lake-Dan Ryan service remained and lasted for 24 years.

For much of the 20th century, the Howard–Englewood/Jackson Park route was equally compatible in terms of passenger service until the late 1960s through the 1970s. However, passenger traffic volumes began to shift on the South Side lines, with more riders using the newer Dan Ryan Line (which runs four miles (6 km) further south) and fewer riders on the older "L" lines. This level of ridership allowed the CTA to develop a more efficient system by combining the more heavily used rail lines together and combining the other lines together, providing increased service capacity for the routes that need it. The Red Line was created in 1993, when the CTA adopted color-coded system for all of its "L" routes.

In February 1993, a new connection opened from the State Street Subway south of Roosevelt to Cermak–Chinatown. The Howard branch was paired with the Dan Ryan branch to form the current Red Line, while the Lake Street branch was paired with the Englewood and Jackson Park branches to form the Green Line. A further operational benefit of this switch was that this freed up capacity in the Loop needed for the addition of the Orange Line to Midway Airport. The former tracks used to move West-South trains from the Loop to the Dan Ryan line are still retained for non-revenue moves and service disruptions.

The Dan Ryan Branch underwent a rehabilitation period to improve its aging infrastructure which ended in early 2007. This work included upgrading the power and signal systems, and rehabilitating the stations with improved lighting, a cleaner appearance, and new escalators and elevators. The CTA has plans to expand Red Line service to ten car trains from the current eight-car trains.

=== Red Ahead rehabilitation ===
In spring 2012, the CTA started a station and track rehabilitation program dubbed "Red Ahead", beginning on the North Side Main Line, which is called the "Red North" project. The program monitors the full route of the Red Line, excluding the Loyola, Bryn Mawr, Sheridan, or Wilson station. This also does not include stations between Wilson through Fullerton, nor the State Street subway. In May 2012, the CTA started to work on the North Side Main Line stations of the Red Line which includes Jarvis, Morse, Granville, Thorndale, Berwyn, Argyle and Lawrence. The stations are listed in order, starting at Granville, then Morse, Thorndale, Argyle, Berwyn, Lawrence and finally Jarvis. This project started in June 2012 and was completed in December 2012. This project is also part of the Red Ahead's "Red & Purple Modernization" Project.

The Red and Purple Modernization Project included the removal of a diamond junction north of Belmont station, replacing it with a flyover for use by outbound Brown Line trains, letting them avoid the earlier practice of crossing onto tracks used by Red and Purple Lines. These changes were expected to decrease train congestion, allowing more frequent service. The project was criticized by 2015 mayoral candidate Chuy García and local residents in the Lakeview neighborhood who organized a referendum to stop it. The Federal Transit Administration passed the CTA's environmental review on the flyover in January 2016 and CTA received a $1.1 billion federal grant the following year. 16 properties affected by the flyover were demolished. Construction began on October 2, 2019, and the flyover entered service on November 19, 2021.

== Upcoming extension ==
The Red Line Extension is a rapid transit extension project that will extend the Red Line south from the 95th/Dan Ryan station to the future 130th station. Construction is scheduled to occur between 2026 and 2030, with the project costing $5.7 billion. Construction began on April 24, 2026.

== Station listing ==
Location	Station	Connections
Rogers Park	Howard	Chicago "L": Yellow Purple; CTA buses: 22 97 147 201 206; Pace buses: 213, 215, 290
Rogers Park	Jarvis	
Rogers Park	Morse	CTA buses: 96 155
Rogers Park	Loyola	CTA buses: 147 155
Edgewater	Granville	CTA buses: 36 136 147 151
Edgewater	Thorndale	CTA buses: 36 136 147 151
Edgewater	Bryn Mawr	CTA buses: 36 84 136 147 151
Edgewater	Berwyn	CTA buses: 36 92 136 146 147 151
Uptown	Argyle	CTA buses: 36 151
Uptown	Lawrence	CTA buses: 36 81 151
Uptown	Wilson	Chicago "L": Purple; CTA buses: 36 78 151
Lake View	Sheridan	CTA buses: X9 80 151
Lake View	Addison	CTA buses: 22 152
Lake View	Belmont	Chicago "L": Brown Purple; CTA buses: 22 77
Lincoln Park	Fullerton	Chicago "L": Brown Purple; CTA buses: 37 74
Near North Side	North/Clybourn	CTA buses: 8 N9 72
Near North Side	Clark/Division	CTA buses: 22 36 70 156
Near North Side	Chicago	CTA buses: 36 66
Near North Side	Grand	CTA buses: 29 36 65
The Loop	Lake	Metra: Metra Electric (at Millennium Station); NICTD: Lakeshore Corridor, Monon Corridor (at Millennium Station); Chicago "L": Blue (at Washington), Brown Green Pink Purple Orange (at Washington/Wabash) (Note: Temporarily, during the closure of State/Lake.); CTA buses: 2 6 10 29 36 62 146 148; Originally part of Washington. Was called Lake–Washington (1996–1997).
The Loop	Washington	Closed October 23, 2006
The Loop	Monroe	CTA buses: 2 6 10 J14 20 22 24 29 36 56 60 62 124 146 147 148 151 157
The Loop	Jackson	Chicago "L": Blue (at Jackson), Brown Pink Purple Orange (at Library); CTA buses: 1 2 6 7 10 28 29 36 62 126 146 147 151
The Loop	Harrison	CTA buses: 2 6 10 29 62 146 148
The Loop/ Near South Side	Roosevelt	Chicago "L": Orange Green; Metra: Metra Electric (at Museum Campus/11th Street); NICTD: Lakeshore Corridor, Monon Corridor (at Museum Campus/11th Street); CTA buses: 1 3 4 X4 12 18 29 62 130 146 192
Armour Square	Cermak–Chinatown	CTA buses: 21 24 62
Armour Square	Sox–35th	Metra: Rock Island (at 35th Street); CTA buses: 24 31 35 39
Fuller Park	47th	CTA buses: 15 24 43 47 51
Fuller Park	Garfield	CTA buses: 24 55 59
Englewood	63rd	CTA buses: 24 63
Greater Grand Crossing	69th	CTA buses: N5 29 30 67 71 169
Greater Grand Crossing/ Chatham	79th	CTA buses: 8A 24 29 75 79
Chatham	87th	CTA buses: 29 87
Roseland	95th/Dan Ryan	CTA buses: 3 N4 X4 N5 N9 29 34 95 100 103 106 108 111 112 115 119; Pace buses: 352, 353, 359, 381, 395; Intercity buses: FlixBus, Greyhound Lines
Roseland/ Washington Heights	103rd	Upcoming station
Roseland	111th	Upcoming station
West Pullman	Michigan	Upcoming station
Riverdale	130th	Upcoming station

== Rail yards ==
There are two rail yards for the Red Line cars: Howard Yard, for the northern portion of the line and the 98th Yard for the southern portion of the line. Another yard, the 120th Yard has been studied as part of the Red Line extension.
