= Fullerton station (CTA) =

Chicago "L" station

Fullerton 2400N 1000W
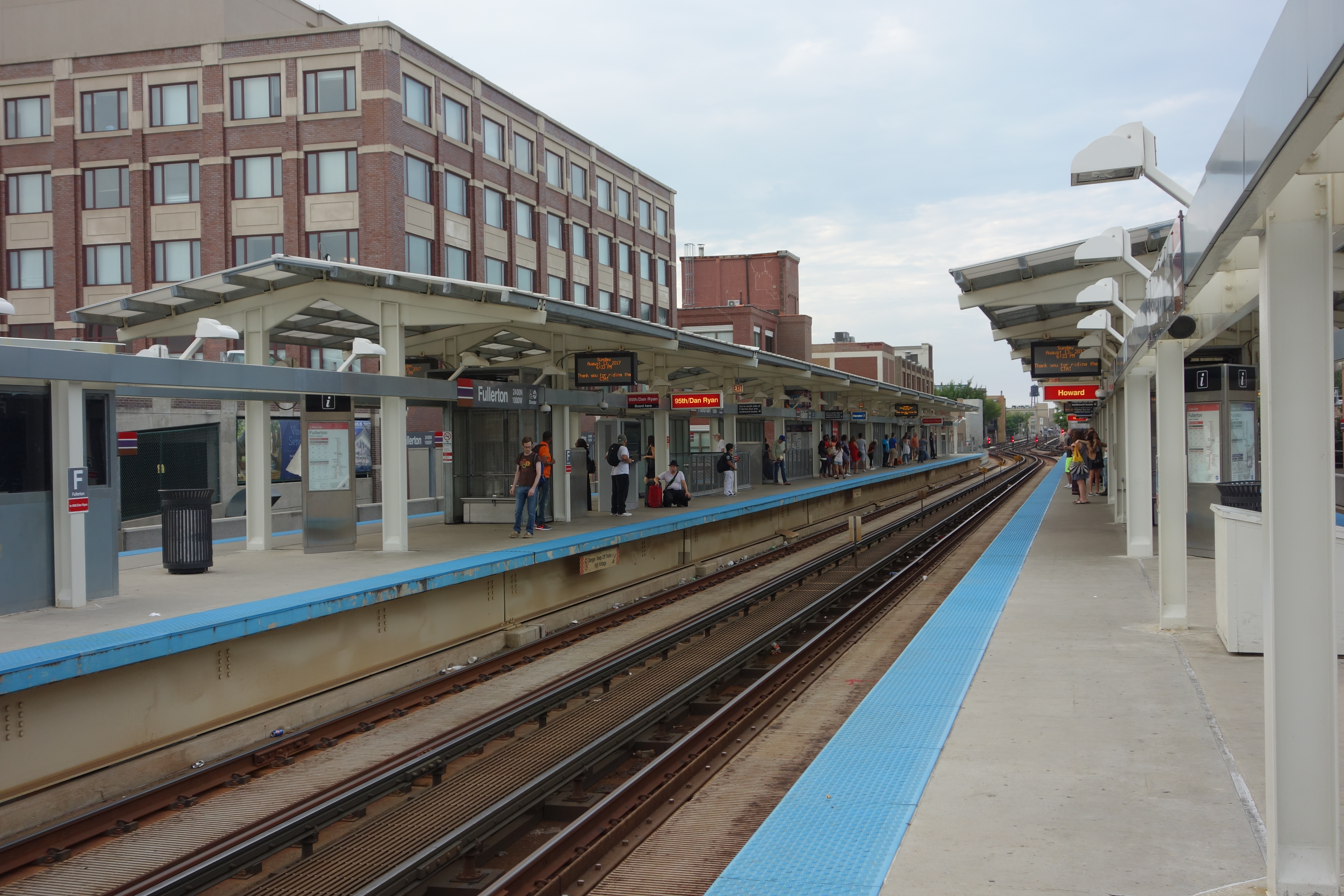

General information
- Location: 943 West Fullerton Avenue; Chicago, Illinois 60614
- Coordinates: 41.925051°N 87.652866°W
- Owner: Chicago Transit Authority
- Line: North Side Main Line
- Platforms: 2 island platforms
- Tracks: 4

Construction
- Structure type: Elevated
- Accessible: Yes

History
- Opened: May 31, 1900; 126 years ago
- Rebuilt: 2006–2009; 17 years ago (station reconstruction)

Passengers
- 2025: 2,548,433 ▲1.6%

Services
Preceding station	Chicago "L"	Following station
Belmont toward Howard	Red Line	North/Clybourn toward 95th/Dan Ryan
Diversey toward Linden	Purple Line Express	Armitage toward Loop (Clark/Lake)
Diversey toward Kimball	Brown Line	Armitage toward Loop (Washington/Wells)
Former services
Preceding station	Chicago "L"	Following station
Wrightwood Closed 1949 toward Howard	North Side main line	Webster Closed 1949 toward Loop (Randolph/Wells) or North Water Terminal
Track layout
Location

Fullerton is an 'L' station on the CTA's North Side Main Line. It is served at all times by Red and Brown Line trains; Purple Line Express trains also stop at the station during weekday rush hours. It is an elevated station with two island platforms, serving four tracks, located in the Lincoln Park neighborhood in Chicago, Illinois. Brown and Purple Line trains share the outer tracks while Red Line trains run on the inner tracks. As well as being an important transfer station, the station serves the Lincoln Park Campus of DePaul University.

== History ==
Fullerton Station opened in 1900 as an express/local stop on the Northwestern Elevated Railroad. In the 1920s, the station's platforms were lengthened to serve eight-car trains, but due to surrounding buildings the platforms were lengthened in different directions; the northbound platform was extended northward, and the southbound platform was extended to the south. In 1949, an additional set of exit stairs was added at Fullerton as well as a 15 feet (4.6 m) tall supervisor's booth on the platform. Off-peak shuttle service on the Ravenswood Line ran from Kimball to Fullerton until 1961, when the shuttles were cut back to their present-day terminus at Belmont.

In 1989, Evanston Express trains began stopping at Fullerton due to increased ridership. The original station house was damaged by a fire in December 1996; the police suspected that the fire was the result of arson. The station house was reopened in February 1997 with only one ticket agent's booth. However, the single booth could not handle the high passenger load at the station, and a new station house was opened next to the original in 1998.

=== Demon Dogs ===
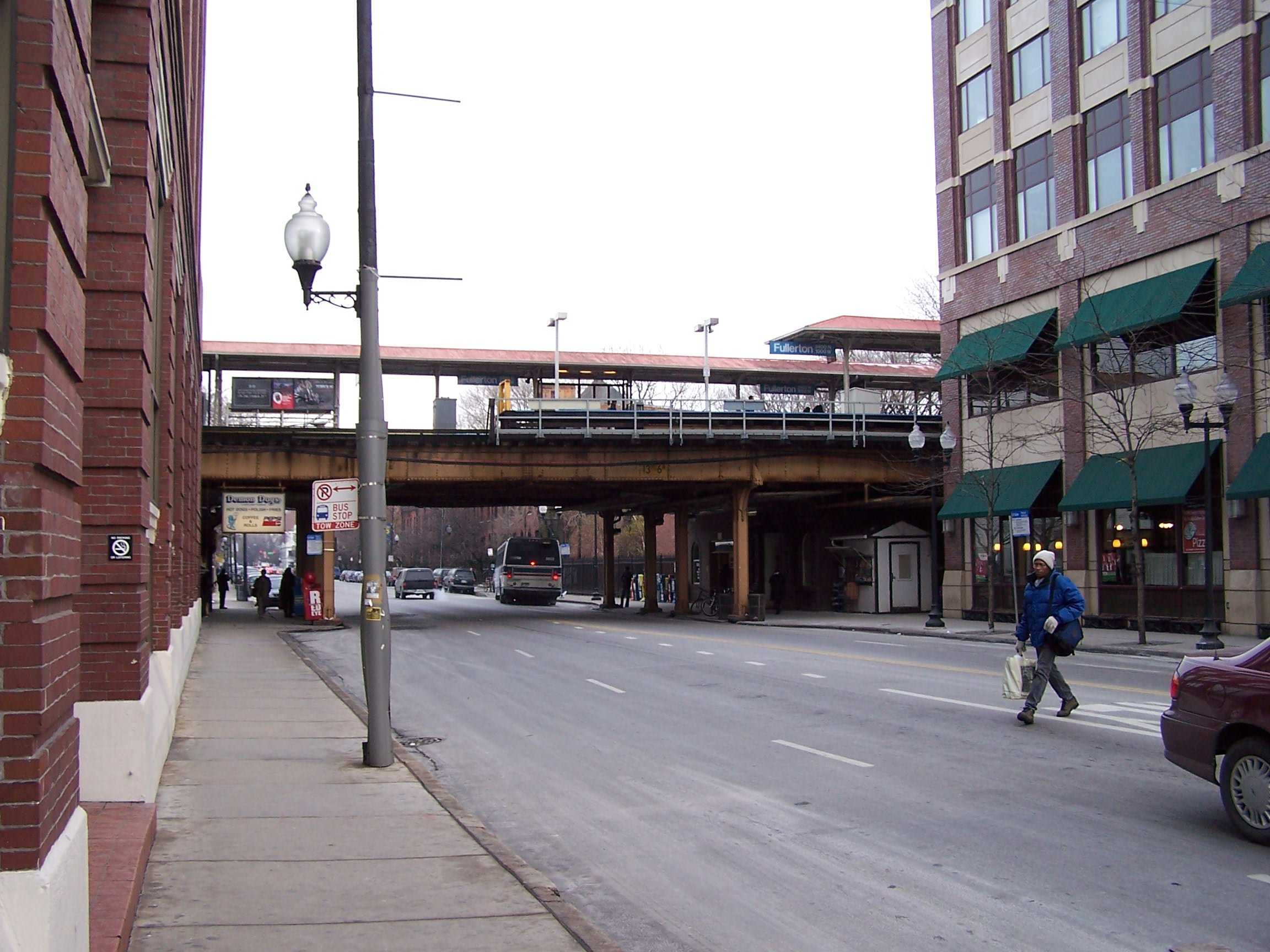
The sign for Demon Dogs is visible on the left, under the L tracks. Photo from 2003

In 1983, the CTA decided to lease the space beneath Fullerton to a business. The CTA, led by chairman Michael Cardilli, granted the lease to Peter Schivarelli, a friend and former coworker of Cardilli's. Schivarelli built the hot dog stand Demon Dogs in the space. While Schivarelli paid for the construction of the stand, he owed a low rent on the property, and the CTA paid the utility bills for the building. The CTA ended this arrangement in 1998 upon its being made public, and Schivarelli sued the CTA as a result. A trial court ruled in favor of Schivarelli, but the CTA appealed the decision, and it was overturned by an appellate court. Demon Dogs remained open until 2005, when it was removed during the station's reconstruction.

=== Brown Line Capacity Expansion Project ===
Fullerton station underwent reconstruction as part of the Brown Line Capacity Expansion Project. The new station has wider platforms and elevators to ensure that it meets ADA accessibility requirements. The new platforms are able to accommodate 10-car trains, allowing for future expansion of the Red Line. Because of its importance, the station remained open throughout the entire project, unlike other stations which faced temporary closures. This was achieved by the use of a temporary station house that opened on October 8, 2006.

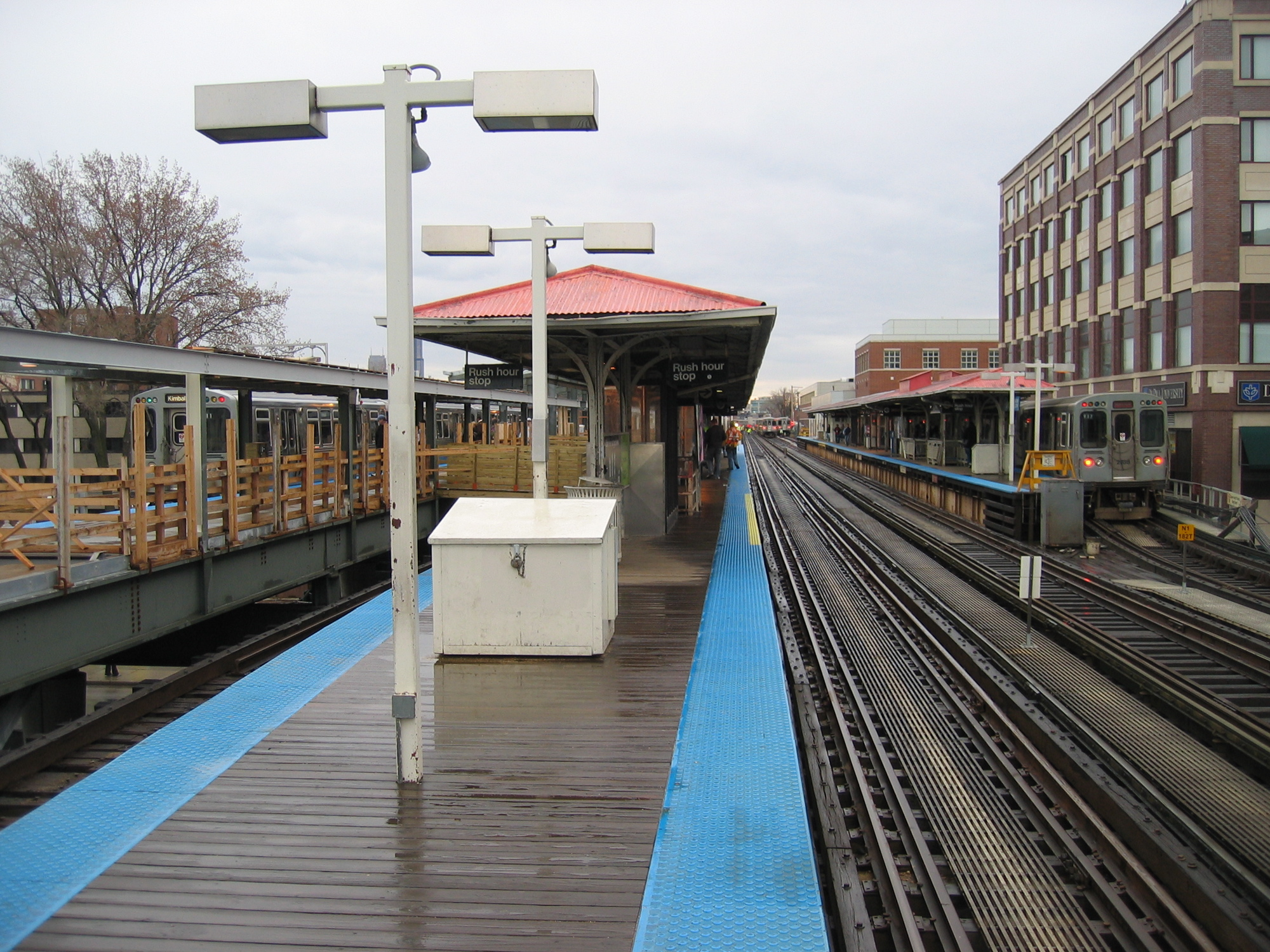
Fullerton station prior to the demolition of the original northbound island platform

The renovation project was not without controversy — the demolition of both the well known Demon Dogs hot dog stand and DePaul University's 1929 Gothic-style Hayes-Healy Athletic Center were unsuccessfully contested. Elevators were placed into service on December 31, 2009, making Fullerton accessible for customers with disabilities.

== Services ==
As part of the Red, Brown and Purple Lines, Fullerton is used by passengers travelling between Lincoln Park and the Loop, Ravenswood and neighborhoods on the North Side. Fullerton is served every seven to eight minutes by Brown Line trains, every five to eight minutes by Red Line trains on weekdays and every seven to ten minutes on weekends, and every 10 to 20 minutes by Purple Line trains during weekday rush hours. While the Brown Line ends service to Fullerton at 1:30 a.m. on weekdays, Red Line trains run 24 hours a day, so the station is open at all times. In 2021, 1,354,840 passengers boarded at Fullerton, a 14.5% increase from 2020. These figures make Fullerton the busiest station on the Brown Line, the fifth-busiest station on the Red Line, and the busiest station on the Purple Line.

The fare controls at Fullerton are located in a new station house on the south side of Fullerton Avenue; the original station house was closed for renovation and was moved across the street and converted to an auxiliary farecard-only entrance. From the station house, staircases lead to the station's two island platforms. The east platform is used by northbound trains, and the west platform is used by southbound trains. Additional exit stairs lead from the platforms to the north side of Fullerton Avenue. The project's Full Funding Grant Agreement with the federal government required that the CTA complete the project by the end of 2009. The new station was completed on December 31, 2009.

== Bus connections ==
CTA

- 37 Sedgwick (weekdays only)
- 74 Fullerton
