= Wrightwood station (CTA) =

Former CTA Station

WRIGHTWOOD 2600N 1000W
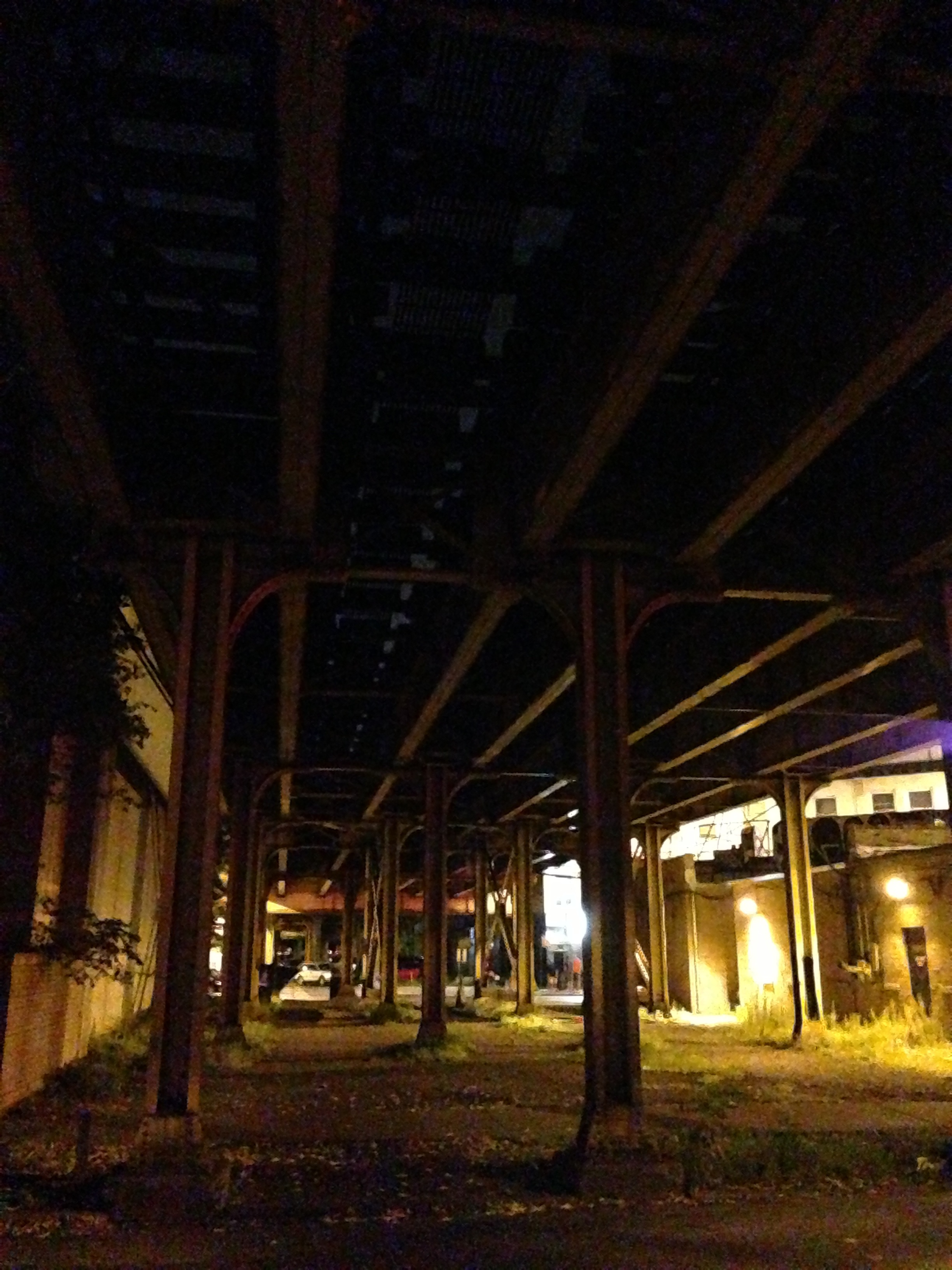
- Location of the demolished station

General information
- Location: Wrightwood Avenue, Lincoln Avenue, and Sheffield Avenue; Chicago, Illinois
- Coordinates: 41.9287°N 87.6530°W
- Owner: Chicago Transit Authority
- Line: North Side Main Line
- Platforms: 2 side platforms
- Tracks: 4 tracks (2 express)

Construction
- Structure type: Elevated

History
- Opened: May 31, 1900; 126 years ago
- Closed: August 1, 1949; 77 years ago

Former services
Preceding station	Chicago "L"	Following station
Diversey toward Howard	North Side main line	Fullerton toward Loop (Randolph/Wells) or North Water Terminal
Location

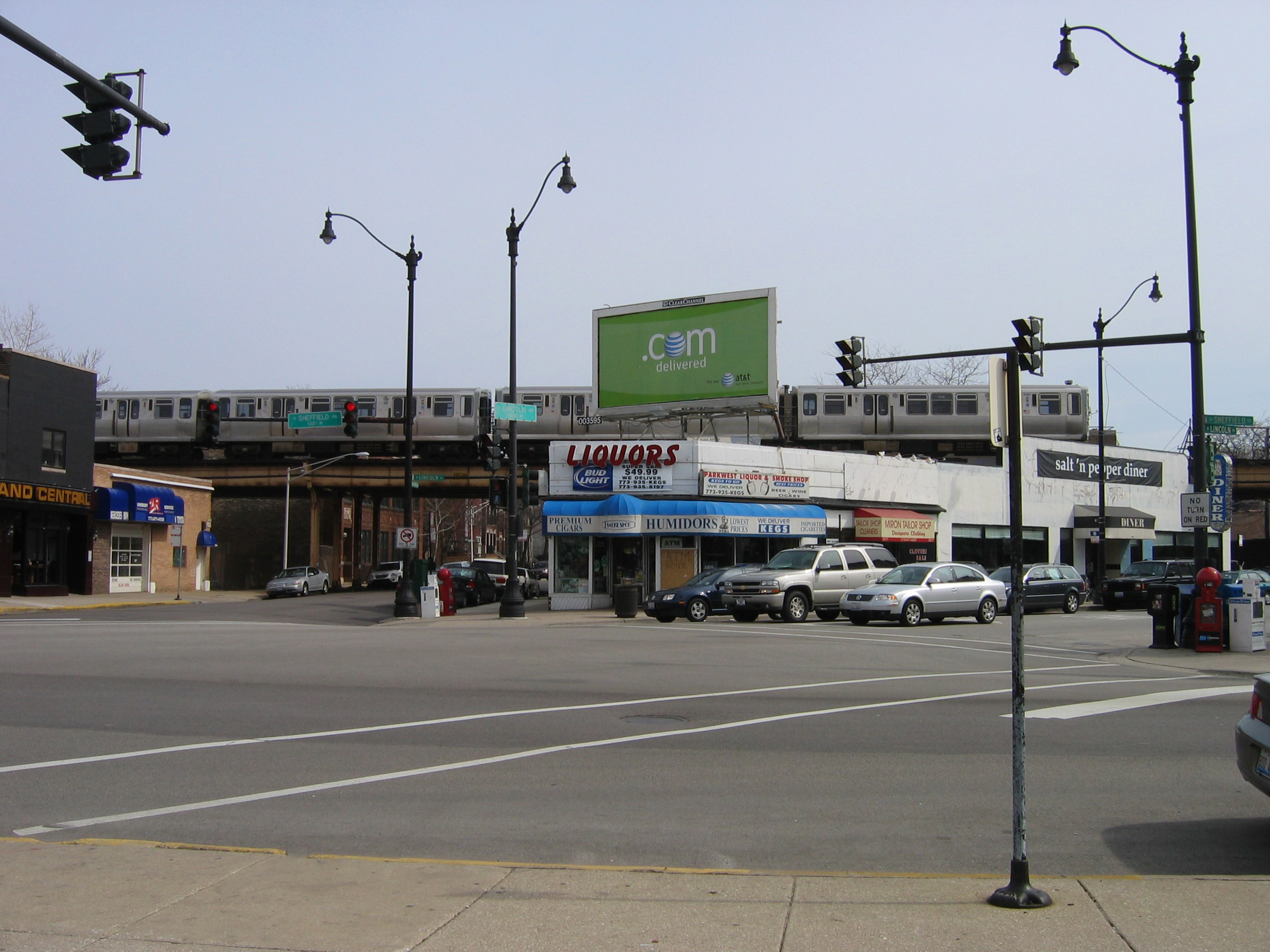
former location of the station

Wrightwood was a station on the Chicago Transit Authority's North Side Main Line, which is now part of the Brown Line. The station was located at Wrightwood Avenue, Lincoln Avenue, and Sheffield Avenue in the Lincoln Park neighborhood of Chicago. Wrightwood was situated south of Diversey and north of Fullerton. Wrightwood opened on May 31, 1900, and closed on August 1, 1949, along with 22 other stations as part of a CTA service revision.

== Station details ==
=== Operations and connections ===
Wrightwood was one of five stations on the Ravenswood route – alongside Western, Irving Park, Addison, and Paulina – served by the Lincoln Avenue streetcar. A carbarn was built at the corner of Lincoln and Wrightwood between 1908 and 1910.

Streetcars serving the Ashland branch of the Lincoln Avenue streetcar terminated south at Wrightwood instead of downtown starting February 1, 1889. This ceased by July 1913, when branch streetcar service was cut back farther north at Belmont.
