= 130th station =

Proposed rapid transit station on the Chicago "L" system

130th 13000S 1100E

General information
- Location: 132nd Street near Doty Avenue; Chicago, Illinois
- Coordinates: 41.65941°N 87.59391°W
- Owner: Chicago Transit Authority
- Line: Dan Ryan branch
- Platforms: 1 island platform; 1 side platform
- Tracks: 3

Construction
- Structure type: At-grade

History
- Opening: 2030

Future services
Preceding station	Chicago "L"	Following station
Michigan toward Howard	Red Line	Terminus
Location

130th is an upcoming rapid transit station for the Red Line as part of the Red Line Extension that will open in 2030. In January 2025, the CTA secured $1.9 billion for the project. The station will be constructed in Chicago's Riverdale neighborhood. The expansion will have job opportunities for the residents of Chicago's far south side.
