= Fifth/Lake station =

FIFTH & LAKE

General information
- Location: Fifth Avenue (Wells Street) and Lake Street; Chicago, Illinois
- Coordinates: 41.88571°N 87.63393°W
- Owner: Lake Street Elevated Railroad
- Line: The Loop
- Platforms: 2 side platforms
- Tracks: 2 tracks

Construction
- Structure type: Elevated

History
- Opened: September 22, 1895; 130 years ago
- Closed: December 17, 1899; 126 years ago

Former services
Preceding station	Chicago "L"	Following station
Canal toward Austin	Lake Street Elevated	Clark/Lake toward Adams/Wabash
Location

Fifth/Lake was a station on the Union Elevated Railroad's line, which is now part of the Loop section of the Chicago "L". The station was located at Fifth Avenue (now Wells Street) and Lake Street in downtown Chicago. Fifth/Lake opened on September 22, 1895, as one of three stations on the Lake Street Elevated Railroad's "Wabash extension". This extension became the Lake Street leg of the Loop upon its completion. Always intended to be temporary as Fifth Avenue was chosen to be the western leg of the Loop, the station closed on December 17, 1899, and was demolished shortly thereafter.

== Background ==
Wells Street had been a part of James Thompson's 1830 plat of Chicago, being named for the local soldier William Wells. Having obtained a reputation for vice, it was renamed Fifth Avenue after the prestigious thoroughfare in New York in 1870 to remove its perceived tarnishing of Wells's name and in the hopes of cleaning the area up.

== Construction ==
The Union Elevated Railroad was the first to obtain rights to go downtown.

== Demolition and aftermath ==
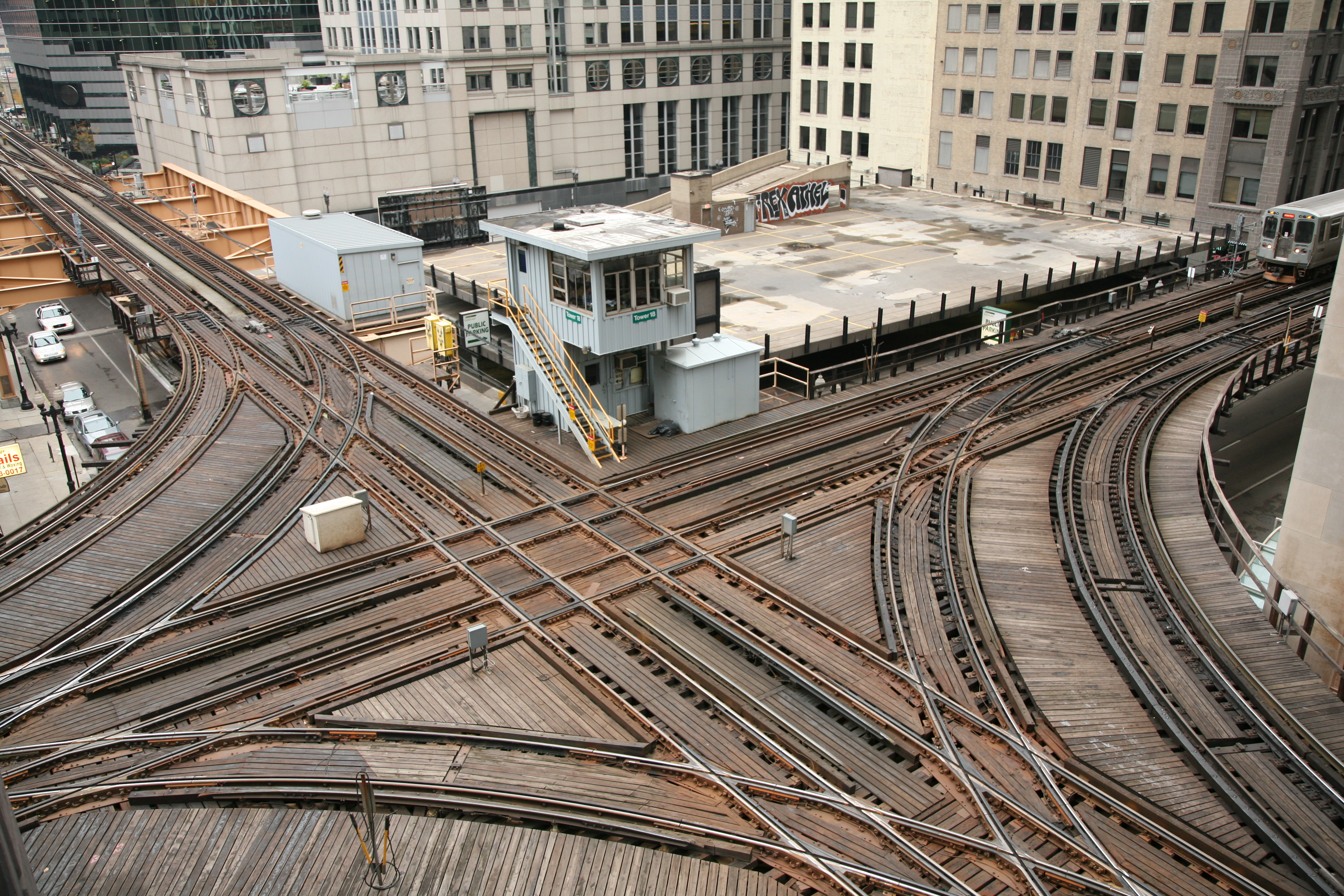
The junction in 2007 that replaced the Fifth/Lake station.

The western leg of the Loop was ultimately decided to be Fifth Avenue, so the station had to be demolished to make way for the junction between it and the North Side elevated. The south (eastbound) platform closed and was demolished in 1896 to make way for the Fifth Avenue leg; however, since the Northeastern Elevated would not construct its entrance into the Loop until 1899, the north (westbound) platform remained in service until December 17, 1899. Lasting for just over four years, the station is the third shortest-lived station in Chicago "L" history, behind only the Jackson Park and Franklin Terminal stations.

To account for the loss of the Fifth/Lake station to local businesses, the station houses of the nearby Randolph & Fifth station were located on Couch Place, half a block south of Lake street. This proved confusing, however, so the station received houses at Randolph Street in 1913; the Couch Place houses would be relegated to administrative offices for the CRT and its successors until the entire station was closed and demolished in the 1990s to make way for the Washington/Wells station.

With the Fifth Avenue renaming having failed to clean up the area as had been hoped, the street was renamed back to Wells Street in the 20th century.
