= Clark/Lake station =

Chicago "L" station

Clark/Lake 100W 200N Clark/Lake 100W 200N
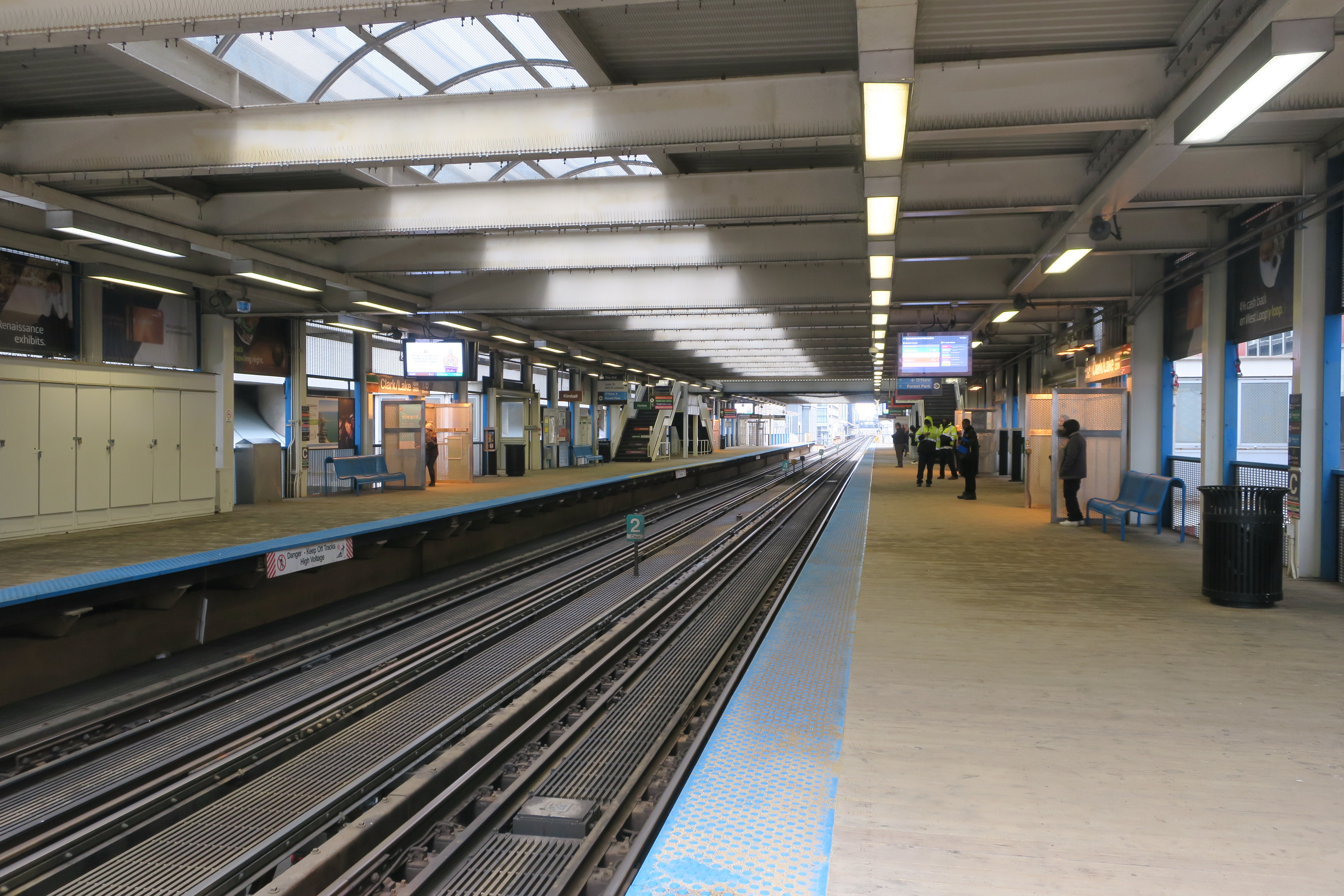
- Clark/Lake elevated platforms

General information
- Location: 100-124 West Lake Street; Chicago, Illinois 60601
- Coordinates: 41.885767°N 87.630886°W
- Owner: Chicago Transit Authority (elevated); City of Chicago (subway)
- Lines: Milwaukee–Dearborn subway Loop Elevated
- Platforms: 2 side platforms (elevated); 1 island platform (subway)
- Tracks: 4 (2 on each level)

Construction
- Structure type: Subway (Blue) & Elevated (Loop)
- Depth: 40 ft (12 m) (Blue Line platform)
- Platform levels: 2
- Cycle facilities: Yes
- Accessible: Yes

Other information
- Website: www.transitchicago.com/station/clkl/

History
- Opened: September 22, 1895; 131 years ago (Elevated Platforms); February 25, 1951; 75 years ago (Subway Platform)
- Rebuilt: 1988–1992; 34 years ago (elevated station)
- Former names: Lake Transfer (Subway)

Passengers
- 2025: 3,202,244 ▲14.3% (CTA)

Services
Preceding station	Chicago "L"	Following station
Grand toward O'Hare	Blue Line	Washington toward Forest Park
Washington/Wells One-way operation	Orange Line	Washington/Wabash toward Midway
Washington/Wells One-way operation	Orange Line	State/Lake Temporarily closed toward Midway
Clinton toward Harlem/Lake	Green Line	Washington/Wabash toward Ashland/63rd or Cottage Grove
Clinton toward Harlem/Lake	Green Line	State/Lake Temporarily closed toward Ashland/63rd or Cottage Grove
Merchandise Mart One-way operation	Purple Line Express	Washington/Wabash toward Linden
Merchandise Mart One-way operation	Purple Line Express	State/Lake Temporarily closed toward Linden
Clinton One-way operation	Pink Line	Washington/Wabash toward 54th/Cermak
Clinton One-way operation	Pink Line	State/Lake Temporarily closed toward 54th/Cermak
Merchandise Mart toward Kimball	Brown Line	Washington/Wabash One-way operation
Merchandise Mart toward Kimball	Brown Line	State/Lake Temporarily closed One-way operation
Former services
Preceding station	Chicago North Shore and Milwaukee Railroad	Following station
Merchandise Mart toward Milwaukee	North Shore Line	Randolph/Wabash One-way operation
Preceding station	Chicago "L"	Following station
Randolph/Wells Closed 1995 One-way operation	Orange Line	State/Lake toward Midway
Fifth/Lake Closed 1899 toward Austin	Lake Street Elevated	State/Lake toward Adams/Wabash
Randolph/Wells One-way operation	Loop Shuttle	State/Lake Next clockwise
Track layout
Elevated station
Subway station
Location

Clark/Lake is an 'L' station located at 100/124 West Lake Street in Chicago's Loop district, and is accessed from the James R. Thompson Center and 203 North LaSalle building. It is one of the most complex stations on the 'L' system, comprising an elevated station and a subway station. The elevated station is serviced by the Brown, Green, Orange, Pink, and Purple Lines, while the subway platform is serviced by the Blue Line.

In December 2014, it had an average of 17,644 weekday passenger entrances, making it the second busiest station in the 'L' system. The Richard J. Daley Center, Chicago City Hall, and Chicago Title and Trust Center are also served by the station. It is the busiest station on the Loop Elevated, and the second-busiest station on the 'L' system as of December 2014.

== History ==
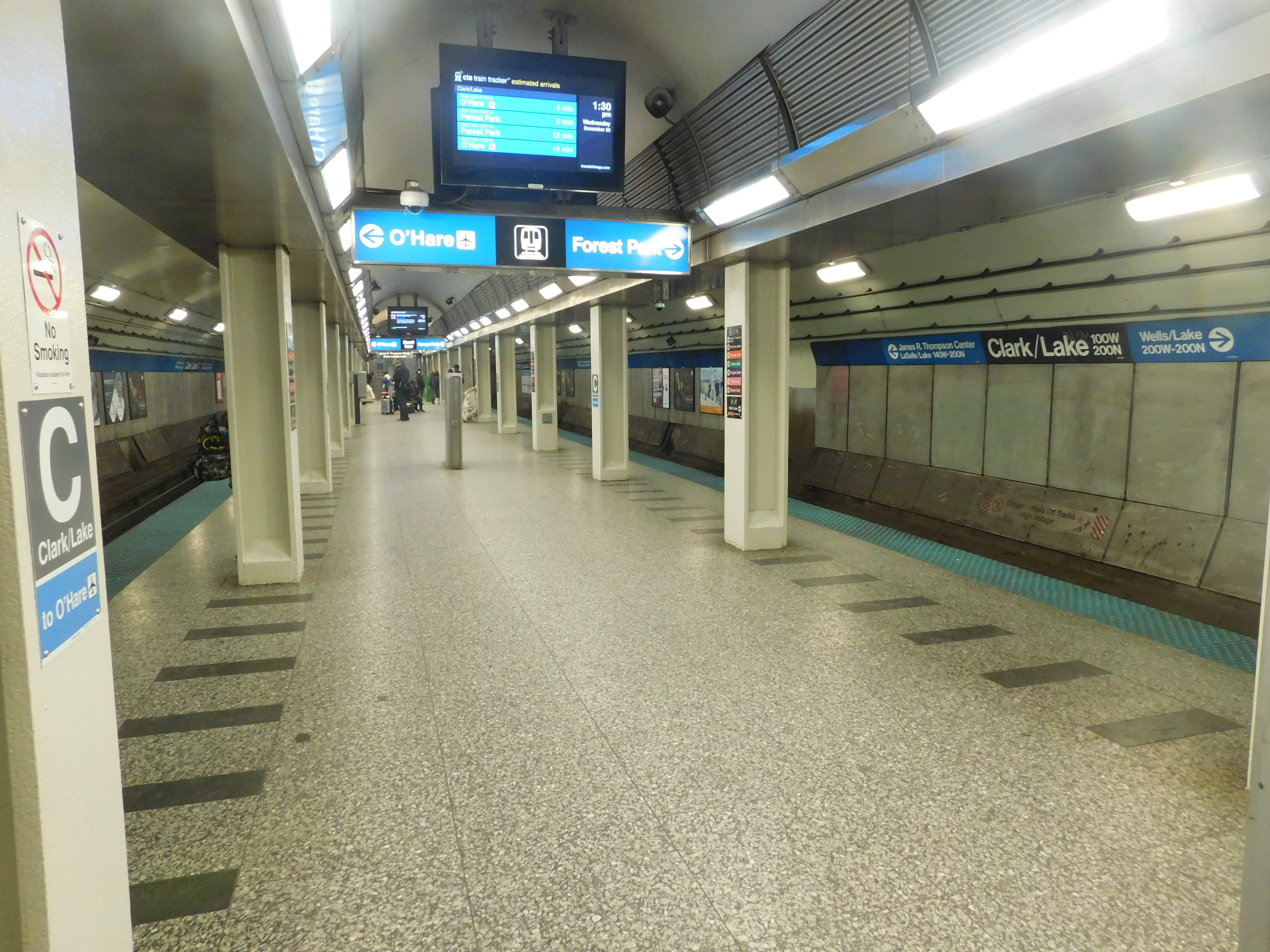
Clark/Lake subway platform, facing east

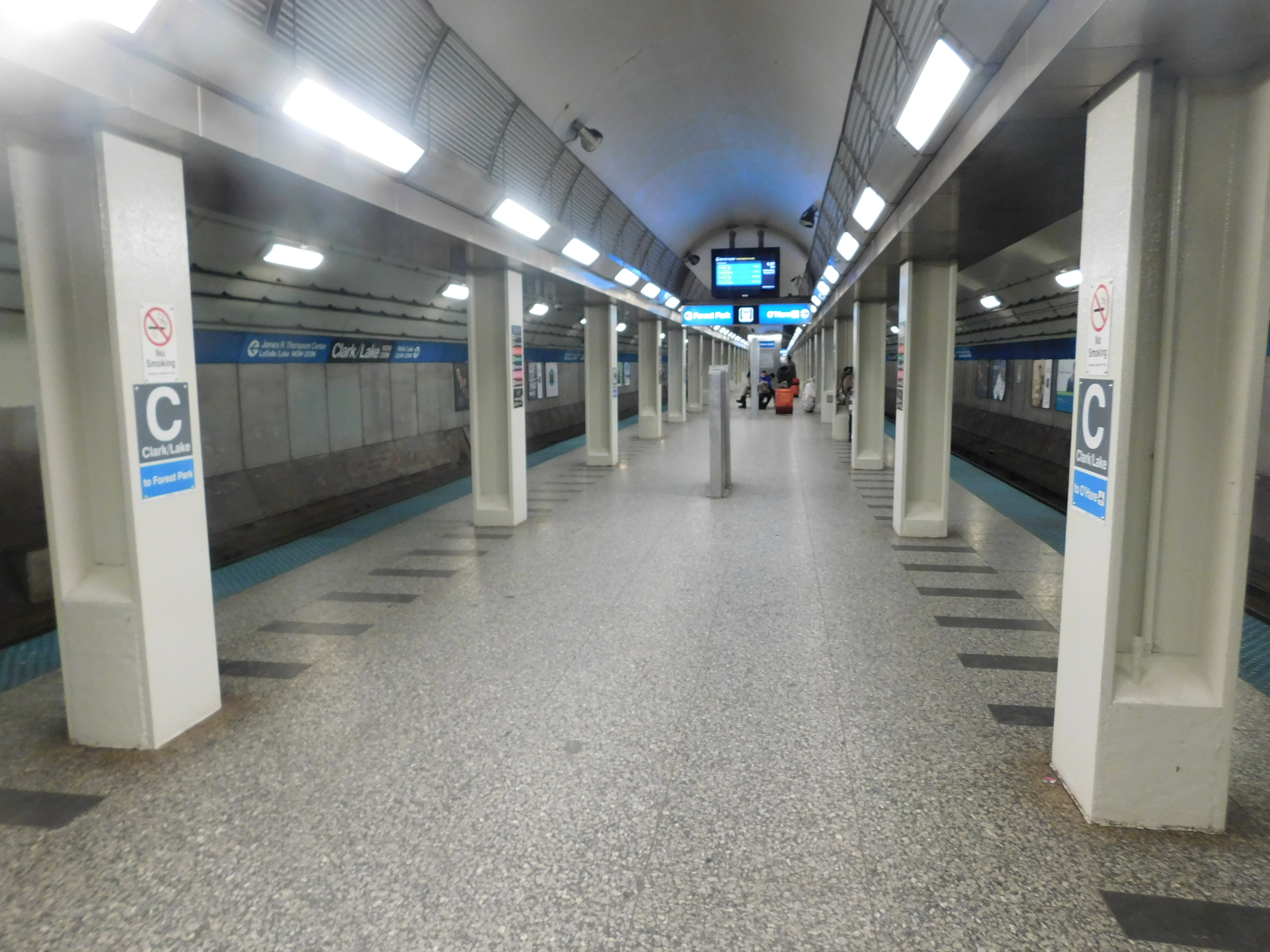
Clark/Lake subway platform, facing west

=== Elevated station (1895–1992) ===
The original elevated station opened on September 22, 1895 as one of three stations on the Lake Street Elevated Railroad's "Wabash extension". This extension became the Lake Street leg of the Union Loop when it was completed in 1897.

=== Subway station (1951–1992) ===
The subway station opened as Lake Transfer on February 25, 1951.

=== Combined station (1992) ===
From 1988 to 1992, the elevated station was reconstructed, with its main entrance in the James R. Thompson Center. This allows transfers between the elevated station and the subway station without leaving the paid area, and so the stations were combined into a single station. Due to this, it is the only station that serves six of the eight lines. The Blue Line serves the subway station while the Green Line stops at both sides of the elevated station, Orange, Pink and Purple Line trains stop at the Inner Loop platform, and Brown Line trains stop at the Outer Loop platform.

=== Renovation and new Google Chicago campus ===
In late 2024, CTA announced a major renovation of the Clark/Lake station. Under an amended agreement with JRTC Holdings, the developer of the former James R. Thompson Center site and new Google Chicago campus, CTA plans to relocate the station’s main entrance from its current location under the tracks on Lake Street to the northeast corner of the building off Clark Street (at the southwest corner of Clark and Lake streets). The project also includes updates to the station mezzanine to better match the surrounding redevelopment.

CTA officials describe the effort as part of a broader initiative to revitalize the Loop and improve rider experience, noting that Clark/Lake connects six rail lines and multiple bus routes and is a key transfer point for thousands of commuters daily.

The renovation is planned in phases through late 2027, with additional platform and station improvements included in CTA’s portion of the project.

== Bus connections ==
CTA

- 22 Clark (Owl Service)
- 24 Wentworth (weekdays only)
- 134 Stockton/LaSalle Express (weekday rush hours only)
- 135 Clarendon/LaSalle Express (weekday rush hours only)
- 136 Sheridan/LaSalle Express (weekday rush hours only)
- 156 LaSalle (weekdays only)
