= Madison/Wabash station =

Former rapid transit station in Chicago

Madison/Wabash 0N/0S 44E
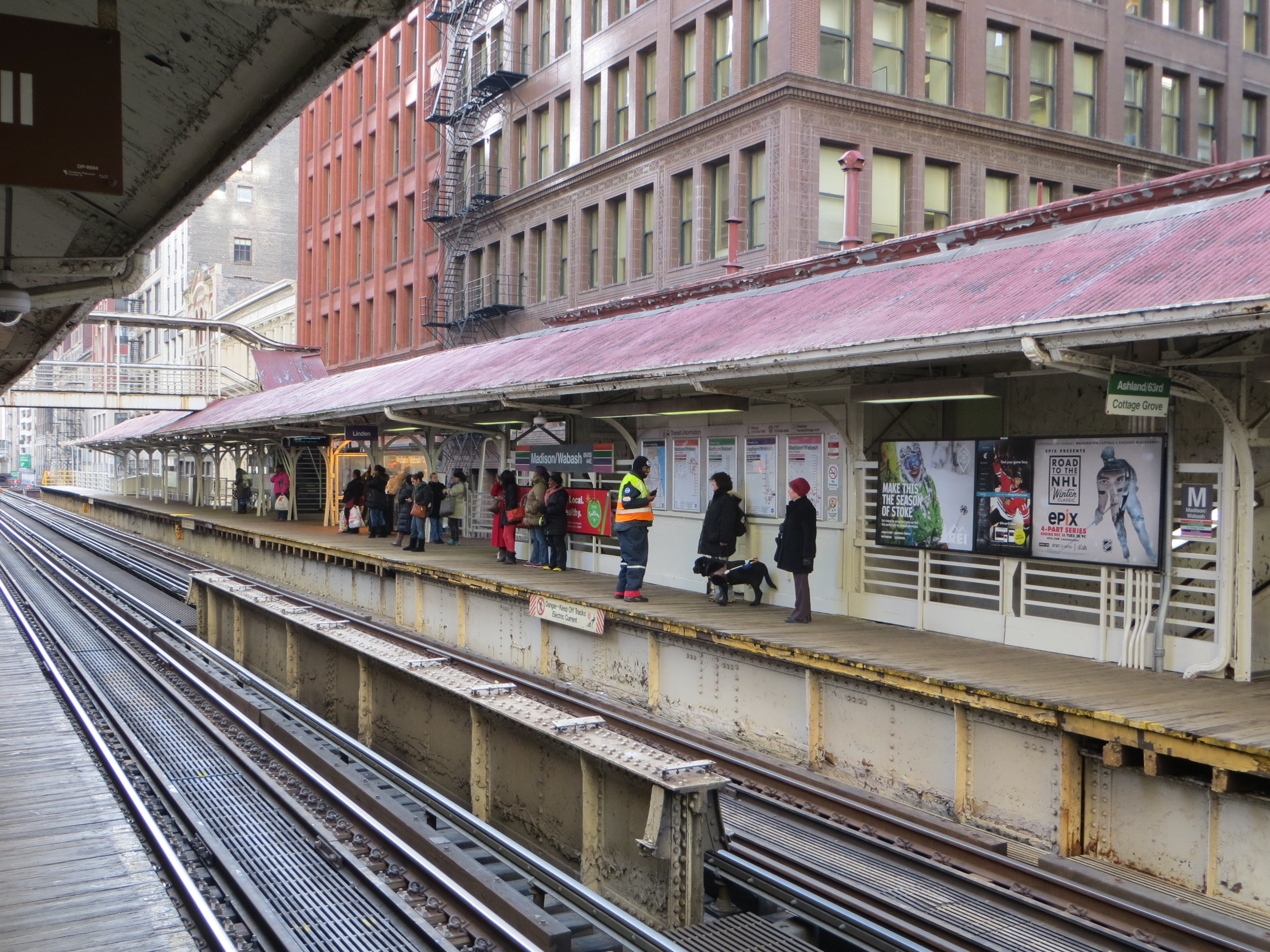

General information
- Location: 2 North Wabash Avenue; Chicago, Illinois 60602
- Coordinates: 41.882023°N 87.626098°W
- Owner: Chicago Transit Authority
- Line: Loop Elevated
- Platforms: 2 Side platforms
- Tracks: 2

Construction
- Structure type: Elevated

History
- Opened: November 8, 1896; 129 years ago
- Closed: March 16, 2015; 11 years ago

Passengers
- 2012: 2,036,939 ▲8.9%

Former services
Preceding station	Chicago North Shore and Milwaukee Railroad	Following station
Randolph/Wabash toward Milwaukee	North Shore Line	Adams/Wabash One-way operation
Preceding station	Chicago "L"	Following station
Randolph/Wabash One-way operation	Orange Line	Adams/Wabash toward Midway
Randolph/Wabash toward Harlem/Lake	Green Line	Adams/Wabash toward Ashland/63rd or Cottage Grove
Randolph/Wabash One-way operation	Purple Line Express	Adams/Wabash toward Linden
Randolph/Wabash One-way operation	Pink Line	Adams/Wabash toward 54th/Cermak
Randolph/Wabash toward Kimball	Brown Line	Adams/Wabash One-way operation
Track layout
Location

Madison/Wabash was a station of the Chicago "L" (elevated) rapid transit system. It served the CTA's Brown, Green, Orange, Pink, and Purple Lines. From 1919 to 1963, it also served interurban trains of the North Shore Line. The station closed on March 16, 2015, and was replaced by Washington/Wabash, which opened on August 31, 2017.

There are no remnants of the Madison/Wabash station in the original location, but a large amount of the station was sold in pieces and preserved as art items. The station was located at Madison Street and Wabash Avenue in the Chicago Loop.

== History ==
Madison/Wabash station opened on November 8, 1896, along with two other stations on the Wabash portion of the Loop Elevated.

=== Replacement station ===
Madison/Wabash closed on March 16, 2015, after Sunday service in the Loop ceased for the night. The entrances were boarded up by morning-time, and trains started bypassing the station when Monday morning service started. The station sat abandoned until demolition commenced in May 2015. During the weekend of May 23–24, 2015, the entire Inner Loop platform was completely removed. On June 6, 2015, the transfer bridge was completely removed. During the weekend of June 20–21, 2015, the entire Outer Loop platform was completely removed. From July to August 2015, the station house, the fare controls, and the mezzanine were removed. The Washington/Wabash station opened on August 31, 2017.

== Gallery ==
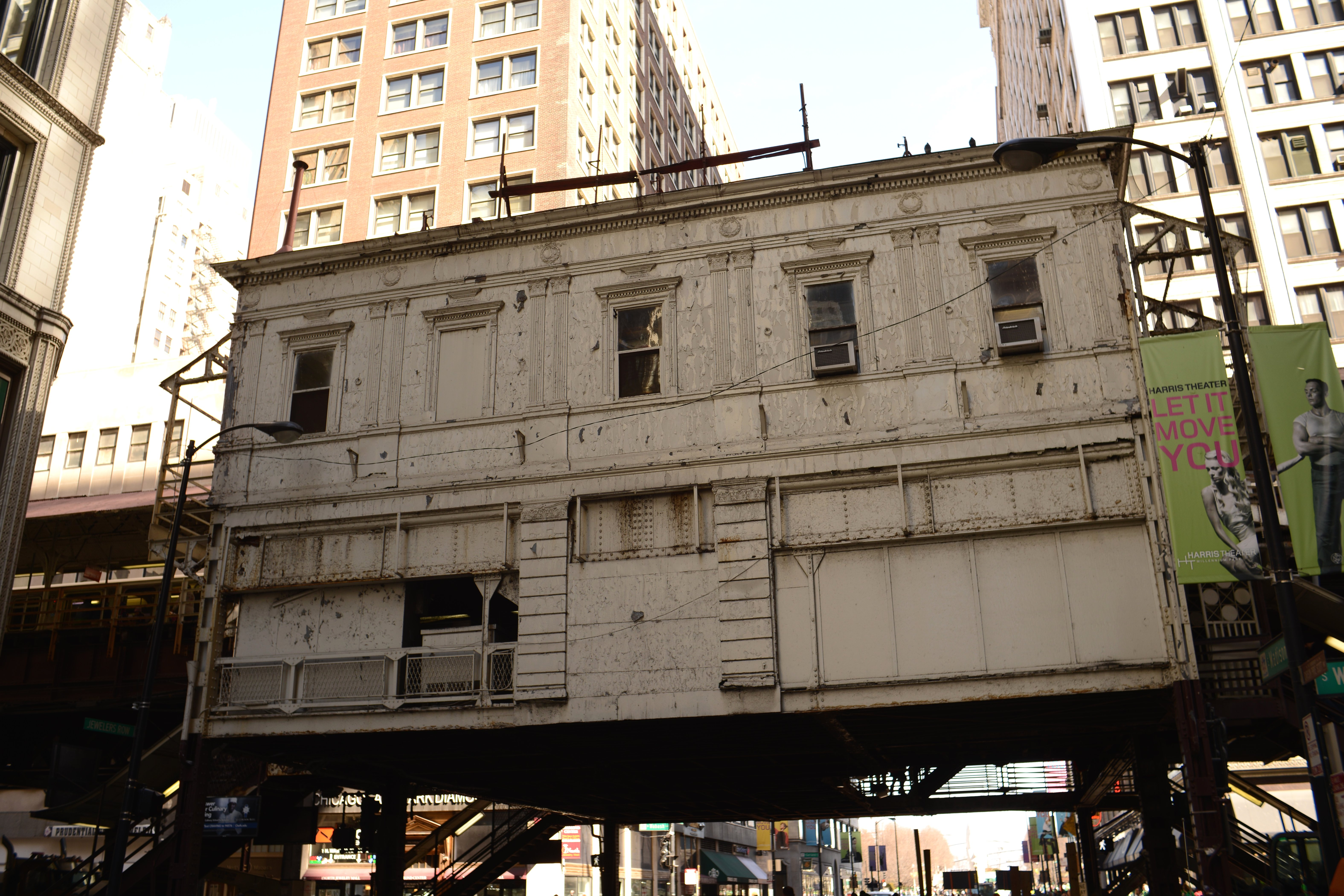
Station house during its final week of service

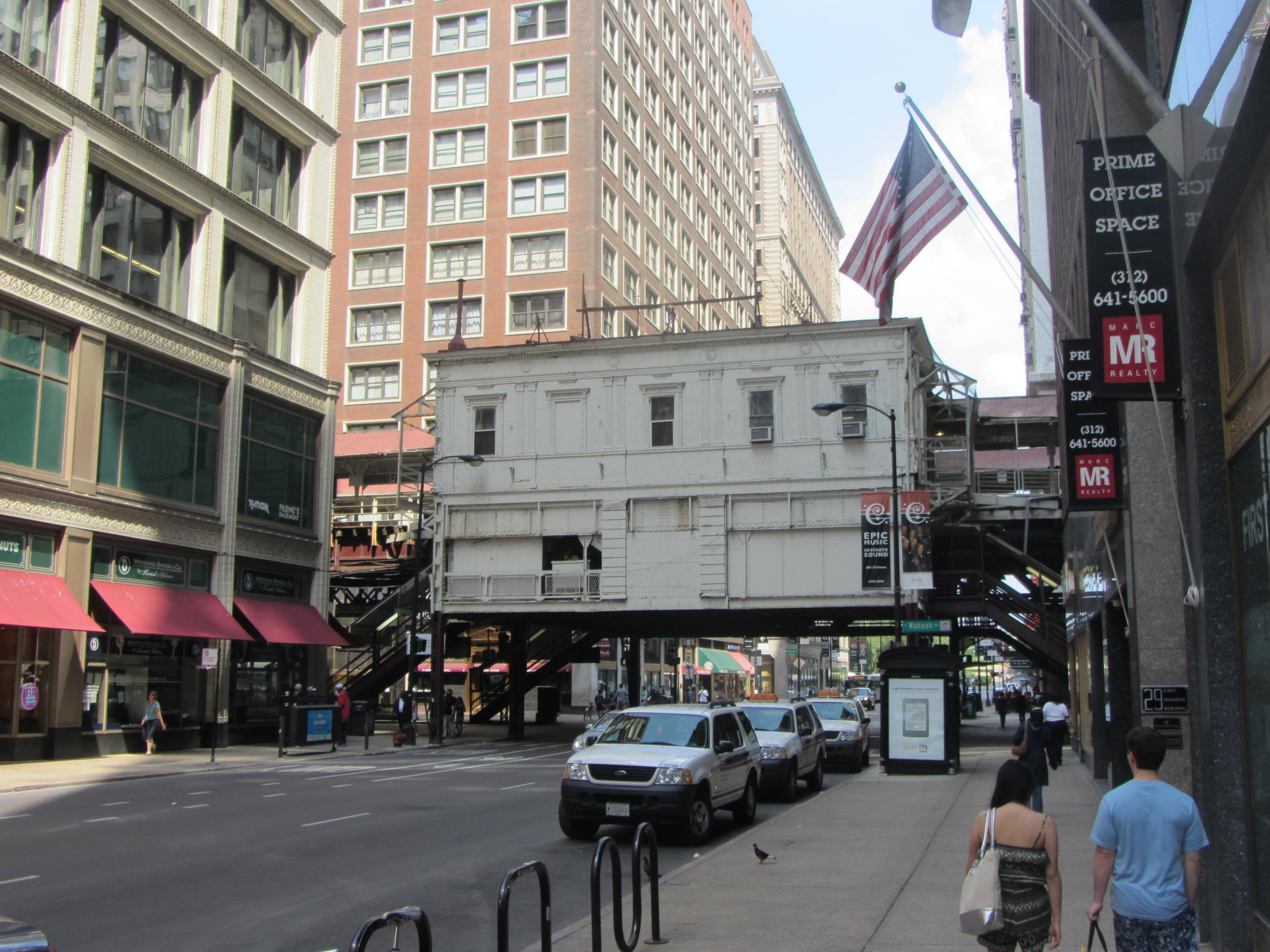
Station house in 2012

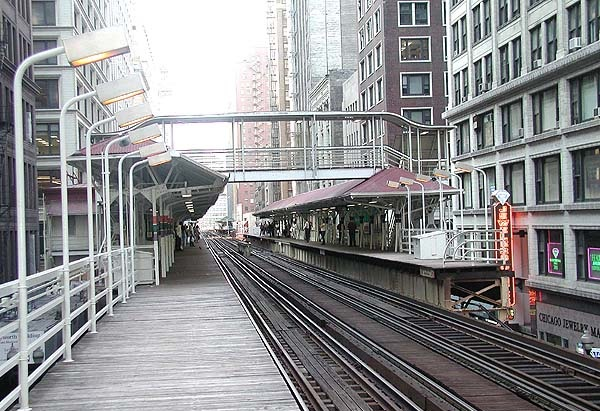
Madison/Wabash station in August 2001
