= Orange Line (CTA) =

Chicago "L" rapid transit line

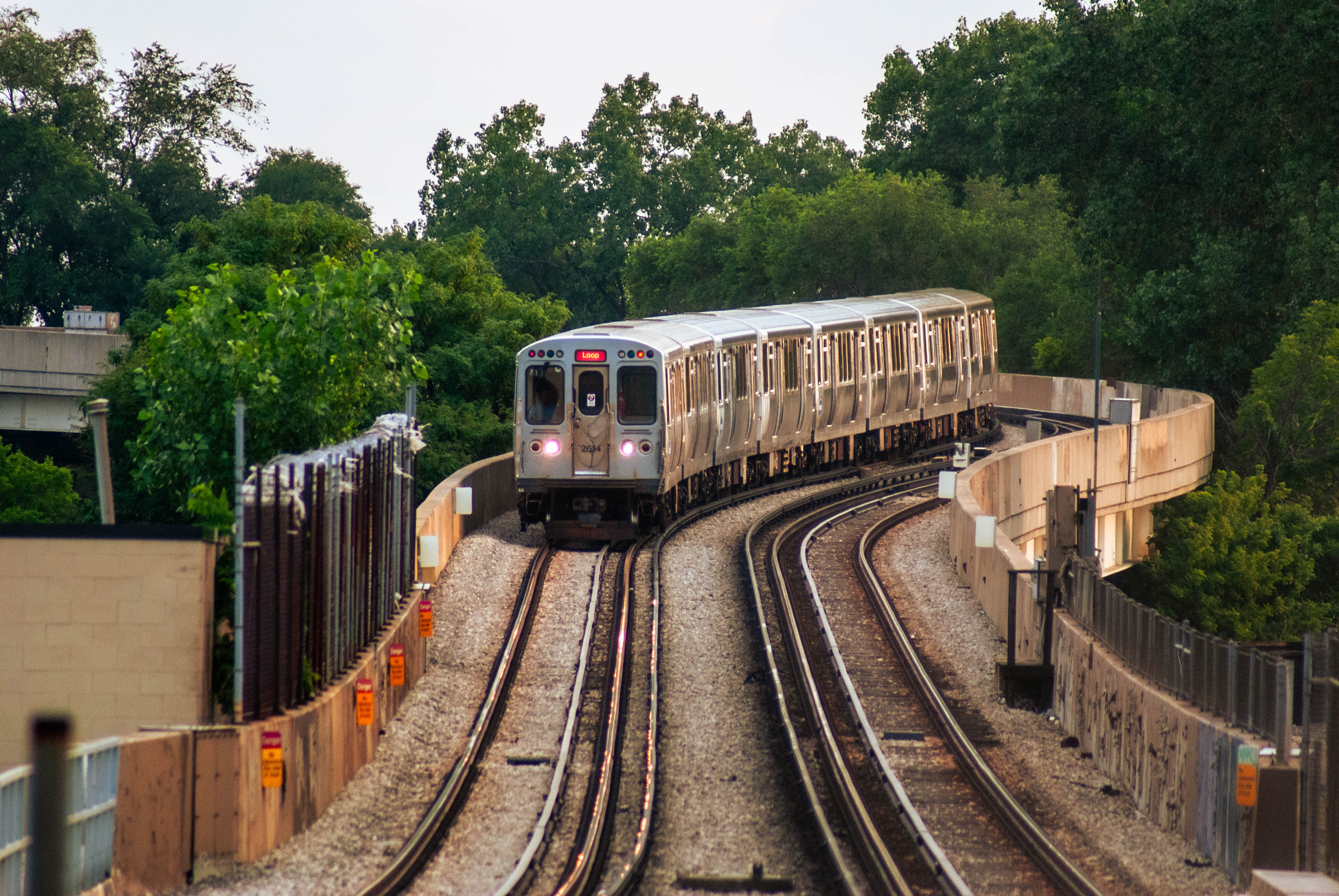
- A Loop-bound Orange Line train approaching 35th/Archer station

Overview
- Status: Operational
- Locale: Chicago, Illinois, United States
- Termini: Midway; The Loop
- Stations: 16

Service
- Type: Rapid transit
- System: Chicago "L"
- Operator: Chicago Transit Authority
- Depot: Midway Yard
- Rolling stock: 2600-series 8 car trains (typical, maximum)
- Daily ridership: 20,089 (avg. weekday September 2024)

History
- Opened: October 31, 1993; 33 years ago

Technical
- Line length: 13 mi (21 km)
- Character: Embankment, elevated and at-grade
- Track gauge: 4 ft 8 1/2 in (1,435 mm) standard gauge
- Minimum radius: 90 feet (27 m)
- Electrification: Third rail, 600 V DC
Route map
Orange Line highlighted in orange

The Orange Line is a rapid transit line in Chicago, Illinois, operated by the Chicago Transit Authority (CTA) as part of the Chicago "L" system. It is approximately 13 miles (21 km) long and runs on elevated and at grade tracks and serves the Southwest Side, running from the Loop to Midway International Airport. As of 2023, an average of 16,979 weekday riders board at stations served exclusively by the Orange Line, or roughly 32,000 daily riders total including shared stations.

Joining the Red and Blue Lines, 24-hour service on the Orange Line is planned to begin in 2026.

== Route ==
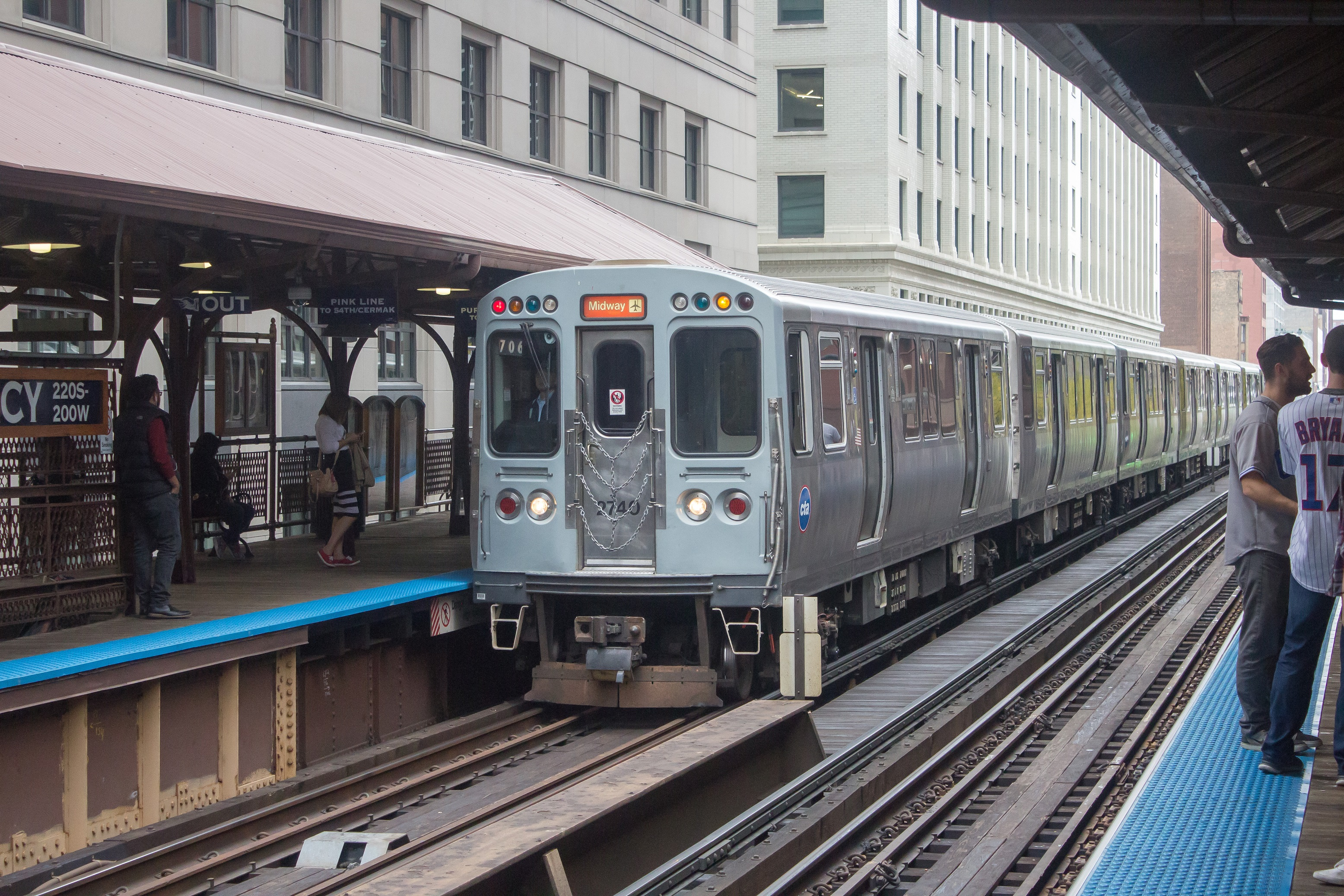
A Midway-bound Orange Line train stops at Quincy

The Orange Line begins in an open cut at a station on the east side of Midway International Airport. From here, the line rises to an elevated viaduct at 55th Street and continues northeast towards the city on railroad right-of-way. Near the intersection of 49th Street and Lawndale Avenue, the line turns east along a CSX Transportation right-of-way to a point east of Western Boulevard, then curves north and northwest on embankment structure along CSX right-of-way to Western Boulevard and Pershing Road.

From here, the line rises on elevated structure again and makes a curve to cross Archer Avenue, the CSX tracks and Western Boulevard before descending onto the Illinois Central Railroad (CN) right-of-way immediately east of Western Boulevard. Entering the IC right-of-way, the line again changes from elevated structure to surface level. The line continues on surface level to Ashland Avenue where it crosses a bridge over Bubbly Creek, a fork of the South Branch of the Chicago River. At this point, the line enters the joint Illinois Central and Atchison, Topeka and Santa Fe (BNSF) Railroad right-of-way continuing on embankment to Canal Street.

There the line again transitions to the elevated structure to bridge Canal Street, Cermak Road and the Chicago & Western Indiana Railroad tracks then curves east to run along the south side of 18th Street, crossing over the Red Line and the Rock Island District tracks near Wentworth Avenue, before joining the South Side Elevated at a flying junction between 16th and 17th Streets. The ballasted track ends and the timber deck begins here. Orange Line trains share the tracks with the Green Line operating from this junction to Tower 12 at the southeast corner of the Loop. Orange Line trains operate clockwise around the inner loop – via Van Buren Street, Wells Street, Lake Street and Wabash Avenue – before returning to Midway.

Along the Orange Line's main route there are seven stations. An eighth station is located at Roosevelt/Wabash on the South Side Elevated which Orange Line trains share with Green Line trains. A passenger tunnel connects this station with the Roosevelt/State subway station on the Red Line.

A downtown superstation was proposed to provide express service from the Loop to O'Hare and Midway airports. In 2008, the project was canceled during the excavation process due to significant cost overruns.

== Operating hours and headways ==
The Orange Line operates between Midway and the Loop weekdays from 3:30 a.m. to 1:25 a.m., Saturdays from 4 a.m. to 1:30 a.m. and Sundays from 4:30 a.m. to 1:25 a.m. On weekdays, headways consists of 10 tph (trains per hour) during rush hour, 8 tph during midday and 5 tph at night. Saturday service consists of 5–8 tph during the day, then 3–4 tph during late night hours. Sunday service runs 5 tph during the day, then 3–4 tph at night.

In November 2025, CTA announced that the Orange Line would begin 24-hour service starting in 2026. Other 24-hour service train lines include the Red and Blue Lines.

== Rolling stock ==
The Orange Line is operated with 2600-series cars. From November 8, 2012, to October 31, 2014, some 2400-series railcars were assigned to the line. From the opening of the route to October 2018, 3200-series railcars were assigned to the line. Trains operate using eight cars at all times.

Beginning in June 2014, CTA began to transfer some 2600-series cars to the line as an interim replacement for its 2400-series cars. The first batch of the Orange Line's 2600-series cars are reassignments from the Blue Line. The lost capacity on the Blue Line was made up from reassignment of newer 2600-series cars from the Red Line, as they were displaced by the new Bombardier-built 5000-series cars on the Red Line. The second batch of 2600-series cars are reassignments from the Red Line as more 5000-series cars were delivered and assigned to the Red Line, replacing the Orange Line's remaining 2400-series cars until the Red Line was fully equipped with the 5000-series cars. The last 2400-series cars were retired from service in October 2014.

After the Red Line was fully equipped with the 5000-series cars, the CTA planned on replacing the Orange Line's 2600-series cars with the 5000-series cars, leaving only the Blue and Brown Lines as the only lines not to operate the 5000-series cars. Lack of available 5000-series cars led them to cancel this plan.

Beginning September 2018, CTA began to transfer the Orange Line's 3200-series cars to the Blue Line. As of October 2018, the 3200-series cars no longer operate on the Orange Line.

== History ==
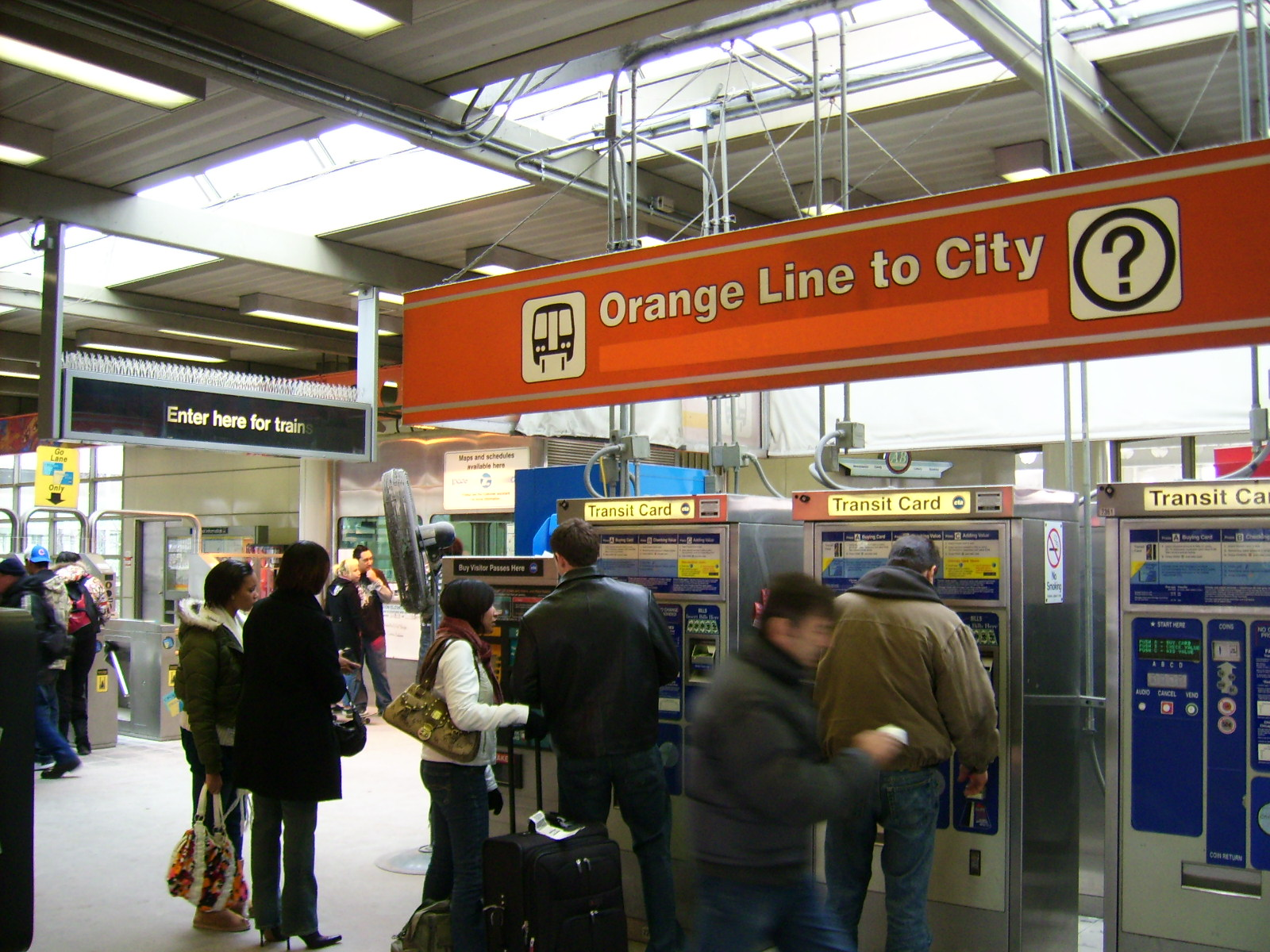
The Orange Line's terminal at Midway International Airport

In the late 1930s, the City of Chicago proposed a subway extension along Wells-Archer-Cicero between the Loop and 63rd Street and Cicero Avenue near Midway (then called Chicago's Municipal Airport).

In 1980, the City began the Southwest Transit Project, which proposed extending the CTA 'L' system to the Southwest Side of Chicago over existing railroad rights-of-way and newer elevated connections along the busy Archer-49th-Cicero Corridor from the Loop to its originally planned terminus at the Ford City Mall. Funding for the project was made possible from Interstate Highway Transfer monies saved after the city decided to cancel the Crosstown Expressway and Franklin Street subway projects. Federal funding for the project was secured by U.S. Representative William Lipinski as a favor from then-President Ronald Reagan, who wanted to thank Lipinski for his vote to provide aid to the Nicaraguan contras.

In 1987, construction of the $500 million transit line began and continued until fall 1993. When the Midway Line opened, the CTA decided to adopt a color-coded naming system for the rapid transit network (like Boston, Washington, D.C., and Cleveland) and named it the Orange Line.

The Orange Line opened for service on October 31, 1993. It was the first all-new service in Chicago since the Dan Ryan Line opened in 1969 and the first extension to the CTA system since the extension of the Blue Line to O'Hare International Airport in 1984.

== Former proposed extension ==
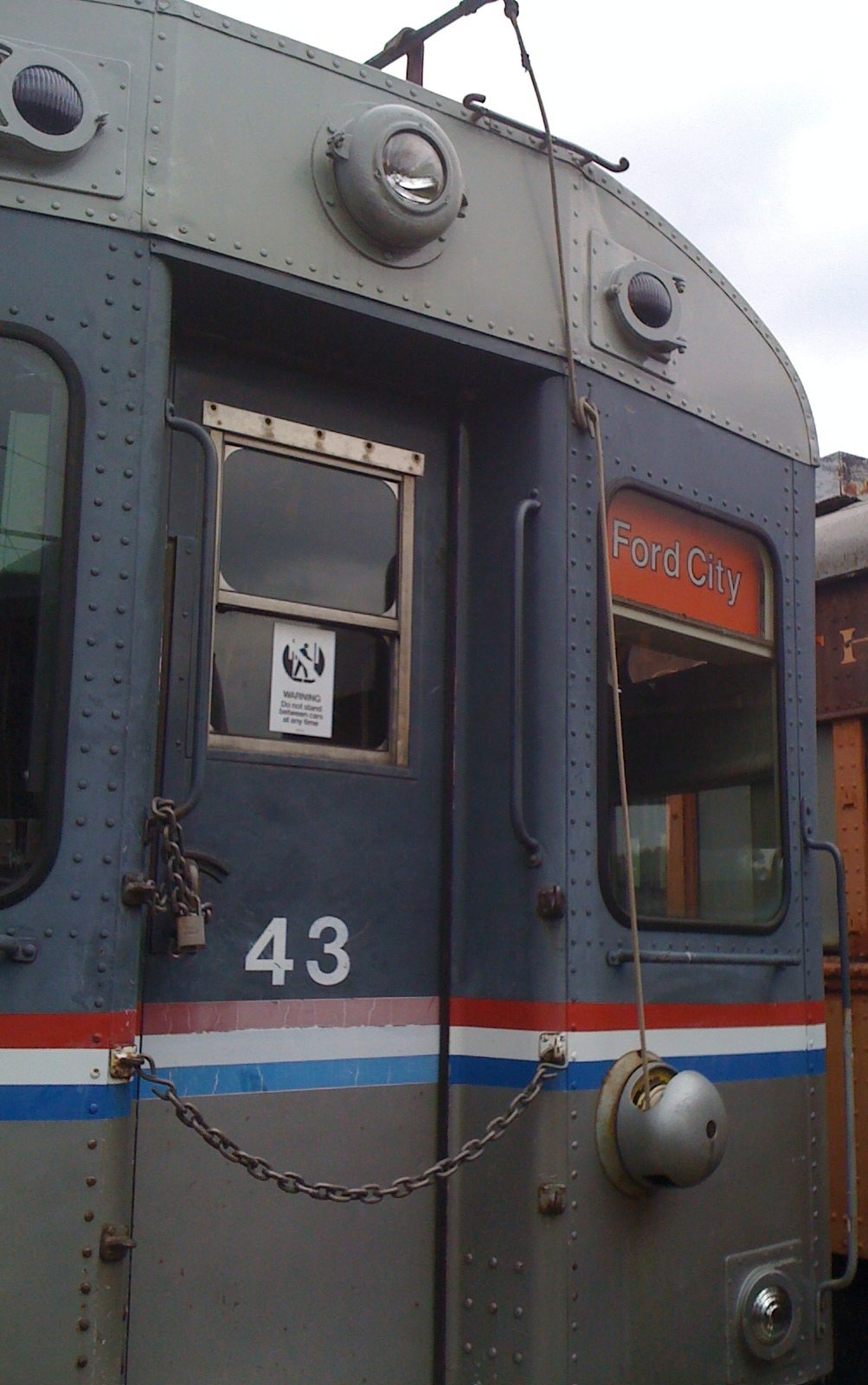
A preserved 1–50 series railcar at the Fox River Trolley Museum displays a "Ford City" destination sign

Printed rollsigns on some CTA rail cars include an entry for "Ford City." The Ford City Mall was formerly located approximately two miles (3 km) south of Midway Airport, and it was originally planned to be the line's terminal. Because there was no federal funding available, the city decided to end the line at Midway Airport.

The CTA analyzed the cost of an Orange Line extension to Ford City in 2008 and determined that the project would cost approximately $200 million. Community meetings were held in neighborhoods surrounding Midway and Ford City to judge the level of public support for the extension.

The four corridors being studied for the Orange Line extension included alignments along Cicero Avenue, Pulaski Road, and a combination of the Belt Railway and either Cicero or Kostner Avenues. The corridors selected for further study were Cicero Avenue (Bus Rapid Transit) and Belt/Cicero or Belt/Kostner (Heavy Rail Transit). In April 2009, the Cicero Avenue/Belt Railway corridor was chosen as the most viable option and advanced in the Alternatives Analysis process. By December 2009, the CTA had identified the Locally Preferred Alternative (LPA) as the Belt/Cicero route. According to a CTA report,

The LPA would operate in a trench along the BRC right-of-way between the existing Midway station and approximately 6400 South, where it would begin to transition to an elevated structure above Marquette Road, where it would curve to the southwest over the BRC Clearing Yard and then continue south on elevated structure in the median of Cicero Avenue. The Orange Line extension would end at a new terminal station in the vicinity of Ford City Mall.

The CTA planned to prepare a draft Environmental Impact Statement (EIS) and complete preliminary engineering. The extension was later canceled.

== Station listing ==
Neighborhood	Station	Connections
Garfield Ridge/ Clearing	Midway	CTA buses: 47 54B 55 55A 55N 59 62H N62 63 63W 165; Pace buses: 315, 379, 383, 384, 385, 386, 390; RVMMTD bus: Midway Commuter; Midway International Airport
Archer Heights/ West Elsdon	Pulaski	CTA buses: 53 53A 62
Brighton Park/ Gage Park	Kedzie	CTA buses: 47 51 52 52A
Brighton Park/ Gage Park	Western	CTA buses: 48 49 X49 94
McKinley Park	35th/Archer	CTA buses: 35 39 50 62
Lower West Side/ McKinley Park	Ashland	CTA buses: 9 X9 31 62
Bridgeport	Halsted	CTA buses: 8 44 62
The Loop/ Near South Side	Roosevelt	Chicago "L": Green Red; Metra: Metra Electric (at Museum Campus/11th Street); NICTD: Lakeshore Corridor, Monon Corridor (at Museum Campus/11th Street); CTA buses: 1 3 4 X4 12 18 29 62 130 146 192
The Loop	Harold Washington Library (inner platform)	Chicago "L": Purple Brown Pink Red (at Jackson), Blue (at Jackson); CTA buses: 2 6 10 22 24 29 36 62 130 146 147 148
The Loop	LaSalle/Van Buren (inner platform)	Metra: Rock Island (at LaSalle Street); CTA buses: 22 24 36 130
The Loop	Quincy (inner platform)	Metra: BNSF, Heritage Corridor, Milwaukee District North, Milwaukee District West, North Central Service, SouthWest Service (at Union Station); Amtrak long-distance: California Zephyr, Cardinal, City of New Orleans, Empire Builder, Floridian, Lake Shore Limited, Southwest Chief, Texas Eagle (at Union Station); Amtrak intercity: Blue Water, Borealis, Hiawatha, Illini and Saluki, Illinois Zephyr and Carl Sandburg, Lincoln Service, Pere Marquette, Wolverine (at Union Station); CTA buses: 1 7 28 37 126 130 134 135 136 151 156
The Loop	Madison/Wells	Closed January 30, 1994; demolished and replaced by Washington/Wells
The Loop	Washington/Wells (inner platform)	Chicago "L": Brown Purple Pink; Metra: Union Pacific North, Union Pacific Northwest, Union Pacific West (at Ogilvie); CTA buses: J14 20 37 56 60 124 157
The Loop	Randolph/Wells	Closed July 17, 1995; partially demolished and replaced by Washington/Wells
The Loop	Clark/Lake (inner platform)	Chicago "L": Blue Brown Green Purple Pink; CTA buses: 22 24 134 135 136 156
The Loop	~~State/Lake~~	Temporarily closed for reconstruction until mid-2029
The Loop	Randolph/Wabash	Closed September 3, 2017; demolished and replaced by Washington/Wabash
The Loop	Washington/Wabash (inner platform)	Metra: Metra Electric (at Millennium Station); NICTD: Lakeshore Corridor, Monon Corridor (at Millennium Station); Chicago "L": Red (at Lake) (Note: Temporarily, during the closure of State/Lake.); CTA buses: N4 J14 20 56 60 N66 124 147 157
The Loop	Madison/Wabash	Closed March 16, 2015; demolished and replaced by Washington/Wabash
The Loop	Adams/Wabash (inner platform)	Chicago "L": Purple Green Brown Pink; CTA buses: 1 7 28 126 151

After stopping at Adams/Wabash, Orange Line trains return to Roosevelt, then make all stops back to Midway.
