= Washington/Wabash station =

Chicago "L" station

Washington/Wabash 100N 44E
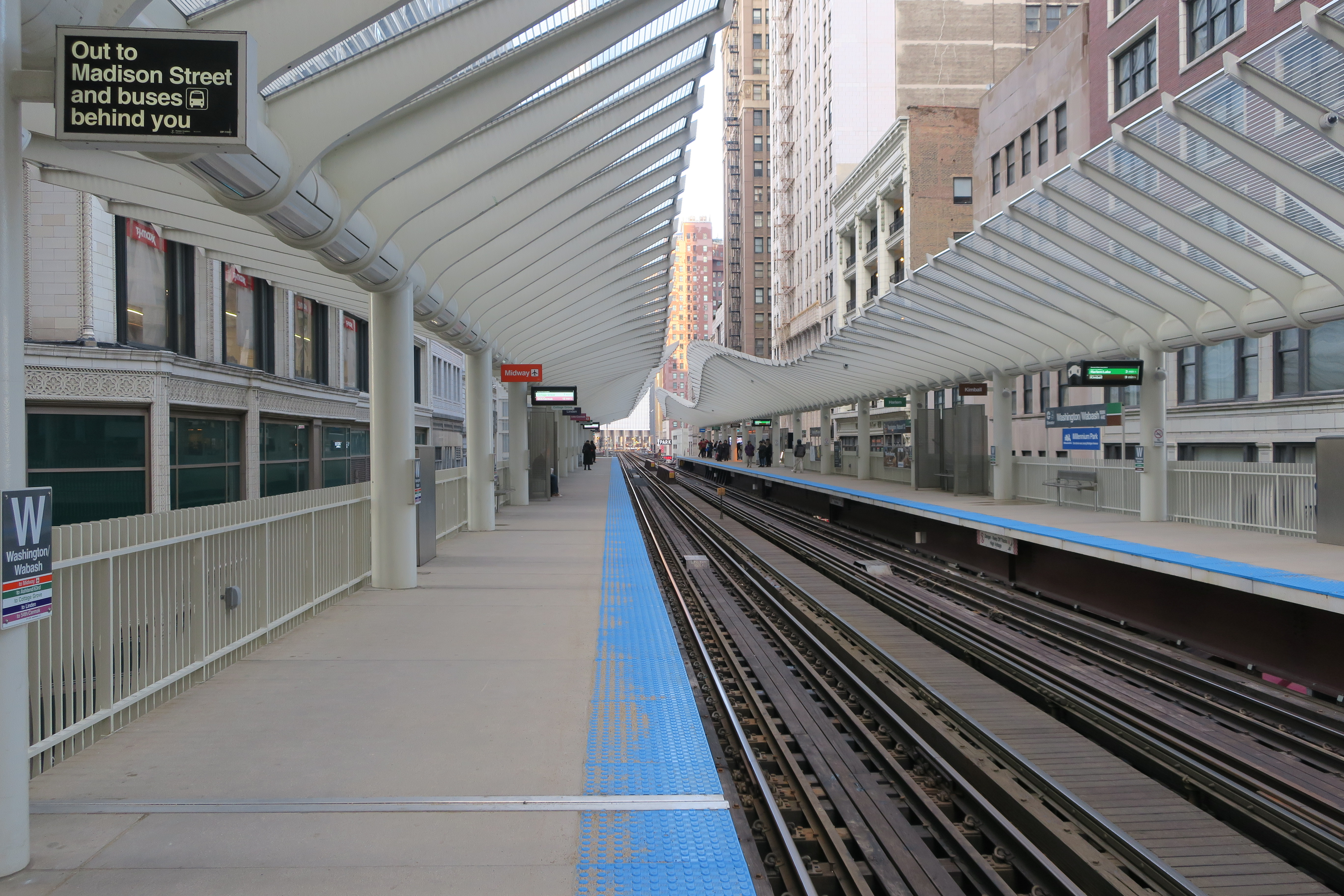
- Inner Loop platform

General information
- Location: 29 North Wabash Avenue; Chicago, Illinois 60602
- Coordinates: 41.882900°N 87.626205°W
- Owner: City of Chicago
- Line: Loop Elevated
- Platforms: 2 side platforms
- Tracks: 2
- Connections: Red at Lake (temporarily, during the closure of State/Lake until 2029) and at Millennium Station

Construction
- Structure type: Elevated
- Accessible: Yes

History
- Opened: August 31, 2017; 8 years ago

Passengers
- 2025: 2,255,225 ▲7.2%

Services
Preceding station	Chicago "L"	Following station
Clark/Lake One-way operation	Orange Line	Adams/Wabash toward Midway
State/Lake Temporarily closed One-way operation	Orange Line	Adams/Wabash toward Midway
Clark/Lake toward Harlem/Lake	Green Line	Adams/Wabash toward Ashland/63rd or Cottage Grove
State/Lake Temporarily closed toward Harlem/Lake	Green Line	Adams/Wabash toward Ashland/63rd or Cottage Grove
Clark/Lake One-way operation	Purple Line Express	Adams/Wabash toward Linden
State/Lake Temporarily closed One-way operation	Purple Line Express	Adams/Wabash toward Linden
Clark/Lake One-way operation	Pink Line	Adams/Wabash toward 54th/Cermak
State/Lake Temporarily closed One-way operation	Pink Line	Adams/Wabash toward 54th/Cermak
Clark/Lake toward Kimball	Brown Line	Adams/Wabash One-way operation
State/Lake Temporarily closed toward Kimball	Brown Line	Adams/Wabash One-way operation
Former services
Preceding station	Chicago "L"	Following station
Randolph/Wabash Closed 2017 One-way operation	Orange Line	Adams/Wabash toward Midway
Randolph/Wabash Closed 2017 toward Harlem/Lake	Green Line	Adams/Wabash toward Ashland/63rd or Cottage Grove
Randolph/Wabash Closed 2017 One-way operation	Purple Line Express	Adams/Wabash toward Linden
Randolph/Wabash Closed 2017 One-way operation	Pink Line	Adams/Wabash toward 54th/Cermak
Randolph/Wabash Closed 2017 toward Kimball	Brown Line	Adams/Wabash One-way operation
Track layout
Location

Washington/Wabash is an 'L' station on the CTA's Brown, Green, Orange, Pink, and Purple Lines. The station opened on August 31, 2017. It serves as a consolidation and replacement of the Randolph/Wabash and Madison/Wabash stations. The project was undertaken by the Chicago Department of Transportation. Construction of the $75 million station began in 2015, following the closure of Madison/Wabash in March 2015 and was completed in August 2017. The station is located between Washington and Madison Streets on Wabash Avenue in the Loop.

In 2018, the new station was recognized with an award of excellence by the American Institute of Architects, Chicago chapter.

== History ==
Before the construction of Washington/Wabash station, two stations were taking the place of the current station: Madison/Wabash station and Randolph/Wabash station. Both stations opened on November 8, 1896, as part of construction on the Wabash portion of the Loop Elevated.

The CTA had proposed consolidating the two stations since November 1981. A similar consolidation project occurred in July 1995, with the opening of Washington/Wells station, a replacement station of both Madison/Wells station and Randolph/Wells station. In September 1998, the CTA proposed a $29 million superstation replacing both Madison/Wabash station and State/Lake station; this plan never happened.

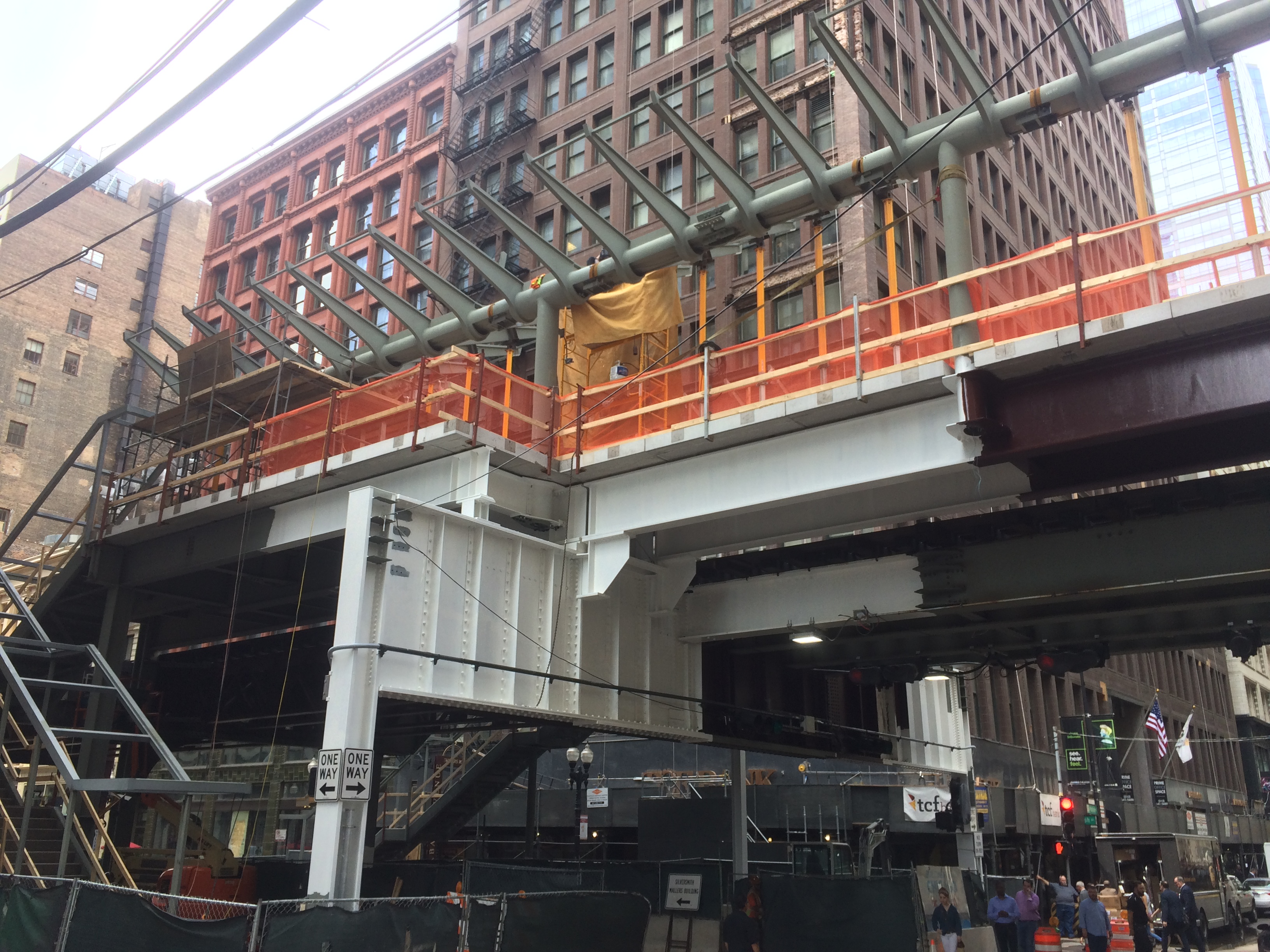
Washington/Wabash station under construction, June 2017

In April 2003, the CTA worked with and gave $1 million to the Chicago Department of Transportation (CDOT) to start preliminary work on a future consolidated station between Madison/Wabash and Randolph/Wabash stations. Ten years later on September 30, 2013, the final design of the new station was unveiled. The station was priced at $75 million, which was funded by the federal Congestion Mitigation and Air Quality (CMAQ) program. The new station was planned to be ADA-accessible unlike its predecessor stations. With the removal of the two original stations, travel time and maintenance cost on the Wabash section would be reduced. Although construction on the new station was planned to begin in fall 2014, it was delayed to March 2015. On March 16, 2015, as part of construction, Madison/Wabash station was closed permanently. The new consolidated station opened on August 31, 2017. Randolph/Wabash station then closed three days later on September 3 in favor of the newly opened station.

== Bus connections ==
CTA

- J14 Jeffery Jump
- 20 Madison (Owl Service)
- 56 Milwaukee
- 60 Blue Island/26th (Owl Service)
- 124 Navy Pier
- 147 Outer DuSable Lake Shore Express
- 151 Sheridan
- 157 Streeterville/Taylor (weekdays only)
