= State/Lake station =

Temporarily closed Chicago "L" station

State/Lake 0E/0W 200N
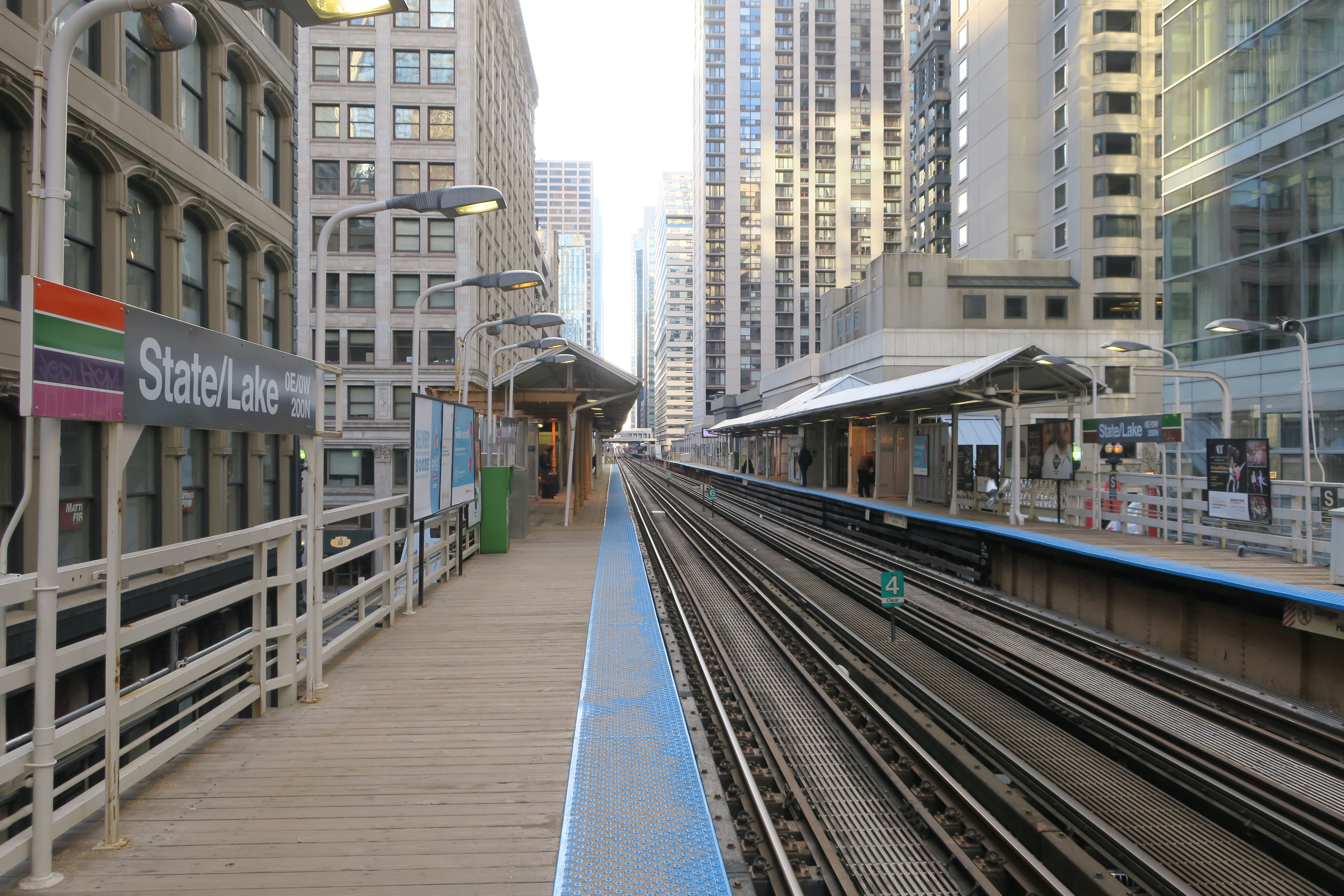
- The original State/Lake station before demolition

General information
- Location: 200 North State Street; Chicago, Illinois 60601
- Coordinates: 41.88574°N 87.627835°W
- Owner: Chicago Transit Authority
- Line: Loop Elevated
- Platforms: 2 side platforms
- Tracks: 2
- Connections: Red at Lake

Construction
- Structure type: Elevated
- Accessible: Starting in mid-2029

Other information
- Status: Temporarily closed

History
- Opened: September 22, 1895; 131 years ago
- Rebuilt: 2026–2029

Passengers
- 2025: 2,667,263 ▲3.9%

Services
Preceding station	Chicago "L"	Following station
Clark/Lake One-way operation	Orange Line	Washington/Wabash toward Midway
Clark/Lake toward Harlem/Lake	Green Line	Washington/Wabash toward Ashland/63rd or Cottage Grove
Clark/Lake One-way operation	Purple Line Express	Washington/Wabash toward Linden
Clark/Lake One-way operation	Pink Line	Washington/Wabash toward 54th/Cermak
Clark/Lake toward Kimball	Brown Line	Washington/Wabash One-way operation
Former services
Preceding station	Chicago "L"	Following station
Clark/Lake One-way operation	Orange Line	Randolph/Wabash Closed 2017 toward Midway
Clark/Lake toward Harlem/Lake	Green Line	Randolph/Wabash Closed 2017 toward Ashland/63rd or Cottage Grove
Clark/Lake One-way operation	Purple Line Express	Randolph/Wabash Closed 2017 toward Linden
Clark/Lake One-way operation	Pink Line	Randolph/Wabash Closed 2017 toward 54th/Cermak
Clark/Lake toward Kimball	Brown Line	Randolph/Wabash Closed 2017 One-way operation
Track layout
Location

State/Lake is a temporarily closed "L" station serving the CTA's Brown, Green, Orange, Pink, and Purple Lines on The Loop. It is located in the Chicago Loop at 200 North State Street. Like all Loop stations, it has two side platforms. The CTA offers farecard transfers between this station and the Lake subway station on the Red Line. Unlike most stations, there is no in-station transfer between directions until mid-2029.

== History ==
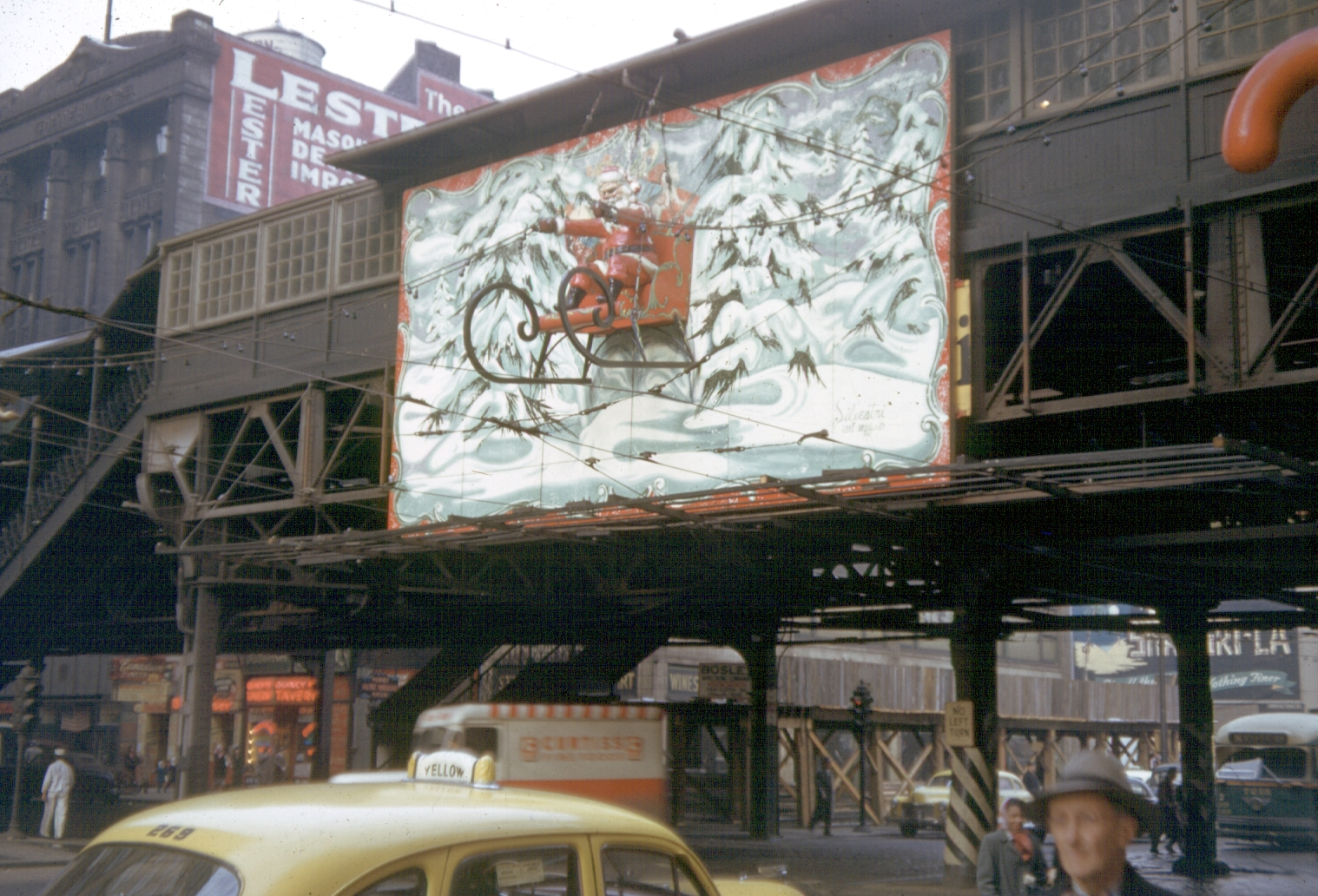
The station in 1949 decorated for Christmas

State/Lake station opened on September 22, 1895, as part of the Lake Street Elevated Railroad's extension into the Chicago Loop that later became the north side of the Union Loop.

One of a series of videos "shot on iPhone 6" to feature in a 2015 Apple advertising campaign features the short journey between Randolph/Wabash and State/Lake, shot in time lapse.

=== Reconstruction ===
In 2021, the Chicago Transit Authority and the Chicago Department of Transportation proposed modernizing and rebuilding the station. Design concepts included the addition of a large glass canopy, wider side platforms, direct access to the State Street subway, and accessibility features like elevators. Work began in August 2025, at which point the project was planned to cost $444 million. The station closed on January 5, 2026, and will reopen in mid-2029.

== Bus connections ==
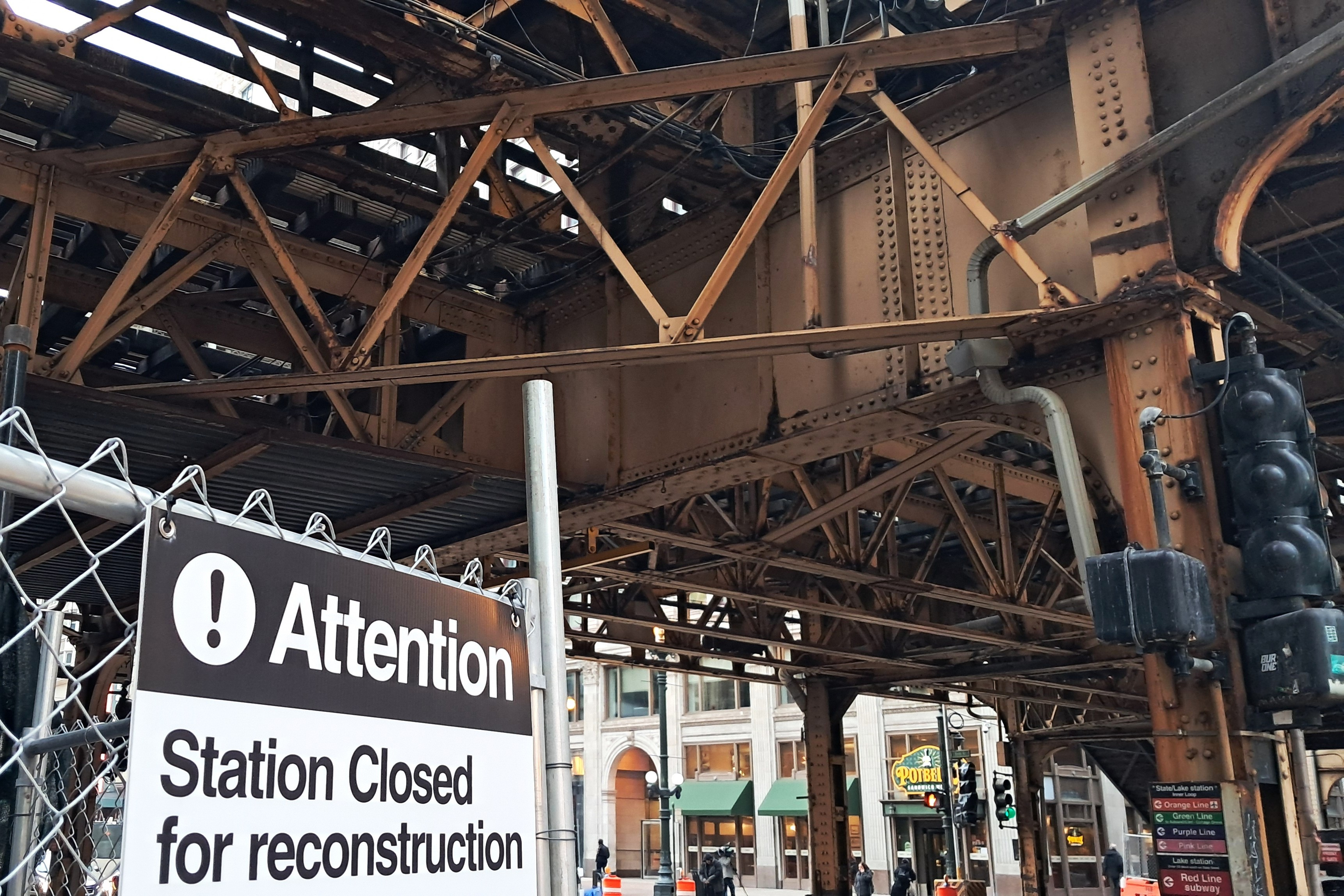
A sign indicating the closure and reconstruction of the station

CTA

- 2 Hyde Park Express (weekday rush hours only)
- 6 Jackson Park Express
- 10 Obama Presidential Center/Museum of Science and Industry Express
- 29 State
- 36 Broadway
- 62 Archer (Owl Service)
- 146 Inner Lake Shore/Michigan Express
