= Randolph/Wabash station =

Train station in Chicago, 1896 to 2017

Randolph/Wabash 150N 44E
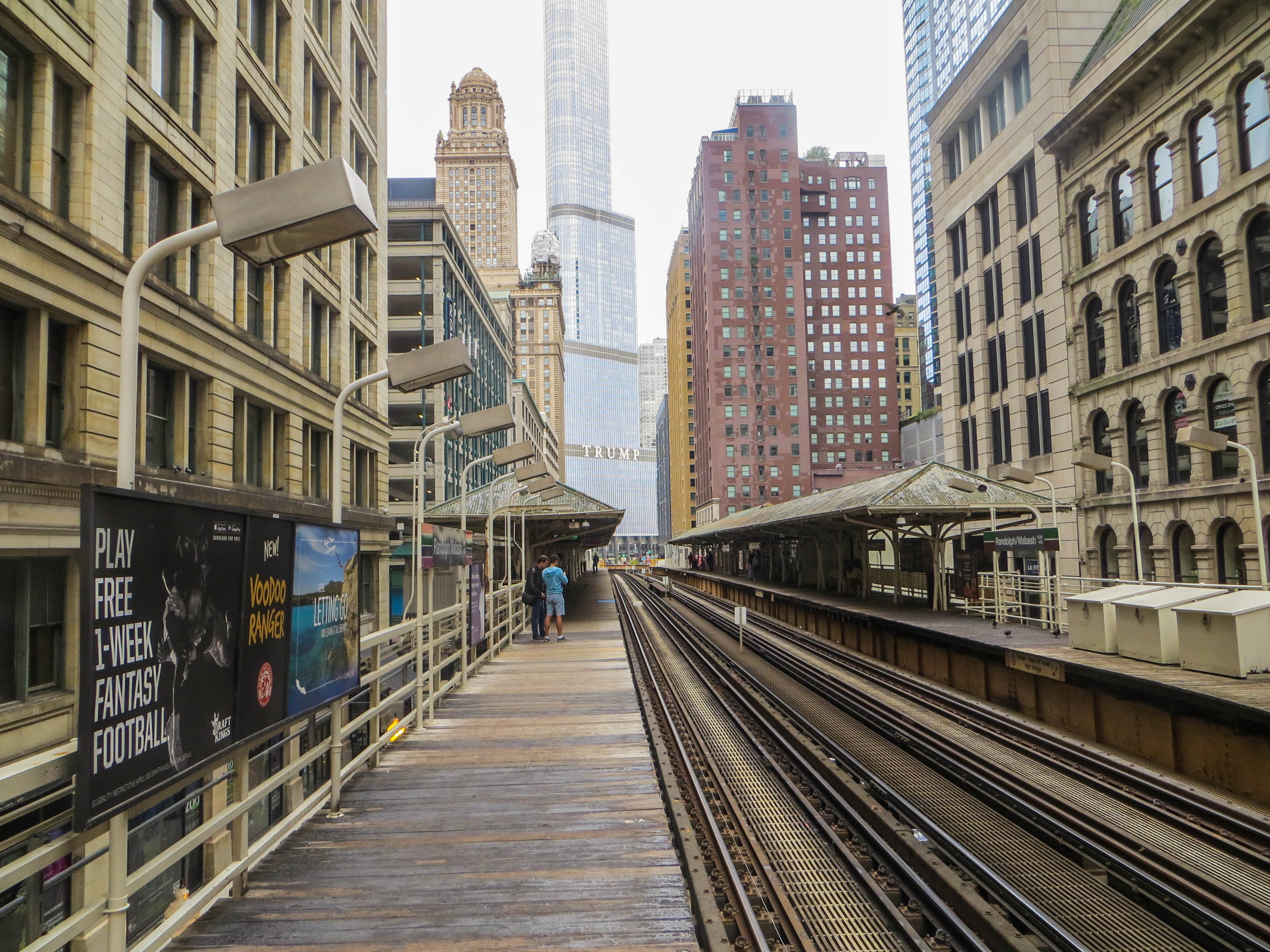

General information
- Location: 151 North Wabash Avenue; Chicago, Illinois 60601
- Coordinates: 41.884431°N 87.626149°W
- Owner: Chicago Transit Authority
- Line: Loop Elevated
- Platforms: 2 Side platforms
- Tracks: 2
- Connections: Millennium Station

Construction
- Structure type: Elevated

History
- Opened: November 8, 1896; 129 years ago
- Closed: September 3, 2017; 8 years ago
- Rebuilt: 1957; 69 years ago (new Inner Loop station house)

Passengers
- 2014: 2,242,622 ▲1.2%
- Rank: 21 out of 143 (Note: Due to possible double-counting of physically-connected stations, the CTA's official 2014 tally of stations was 145, but for ridership purposes reported having only 143 stations.)

Former services
Preceding station	Chicago North Shore and Milwaukee Railroad	Following station
Clark/Lake toward Milwaukee	North Shore Line	Madison/Wabash One-way operation
Preceding station	Chicago "L"	Following station
State/Lake One-way operation	Orange Line	Washington/Wabash toward Midway
State/Lake toward Harlem/Lake	Green Line	Washington/Wabash toward Ashland/63rd or Cottage Grove
State/Lake One-way operation	Purple Line Express	Washington/Wabash toward Linden
State/Lake One-way operation	Pink Line	Washington/Wabash toward 54th/Cermak
State/Lake toward Kimball	Brown Line	Washington/Wabash One-way operation
Track layout
Location

Randolph/Wabash was an elevated 'L' station in the Loop in Chicago. Located at Randolph Street and Wabash Avenue, it served trains running on the Chicago Transit Authority's Brown and Green lines on the outer loop track, and the Green, Orange, Pink, and Purple lines on the inner loop track. Randolph/Wabash was the closest 'L' station to Metra's Millennium Station until its closure on September 3, 2017. The station was later demolished.

== History ==
Randolph/Wabash opened on November 8, 1896, to be used by trains on the Lake Street Elevated Railroad (now the western section of the Green Line). The original inner loop station house was replaced in 1957, and the outer loop station house was removed in the 1960s. On September 3, 2017, Randolph/Wabash closed, three days after its replacement, Washington/Wabash station, opened.

== In popular culture ==
Randolph/Wabash was used for exterior shots in the 1995 film While You Were Sleeping. The station also appeared in the 1987 film Adventures in Babysitting. In addition, a 2015 Apple advertising campaign, "Shot on iPhone 6", features the short journey between Randolph/Wabash and State/Lake shot in time lapse.

== Gallery ==
Station Exterior

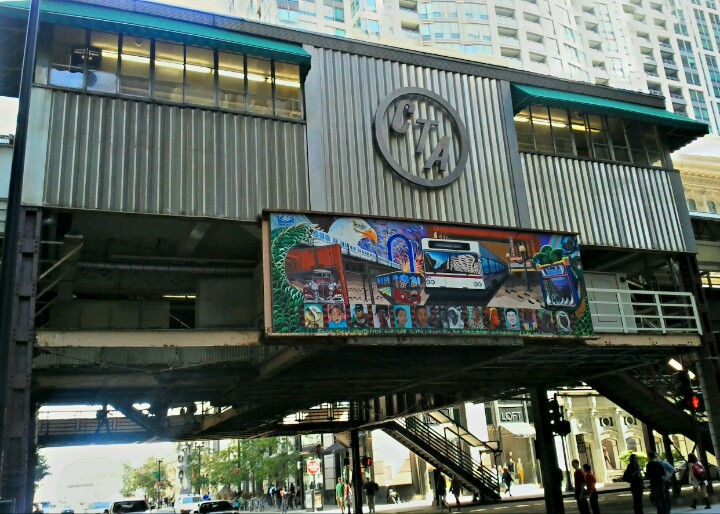

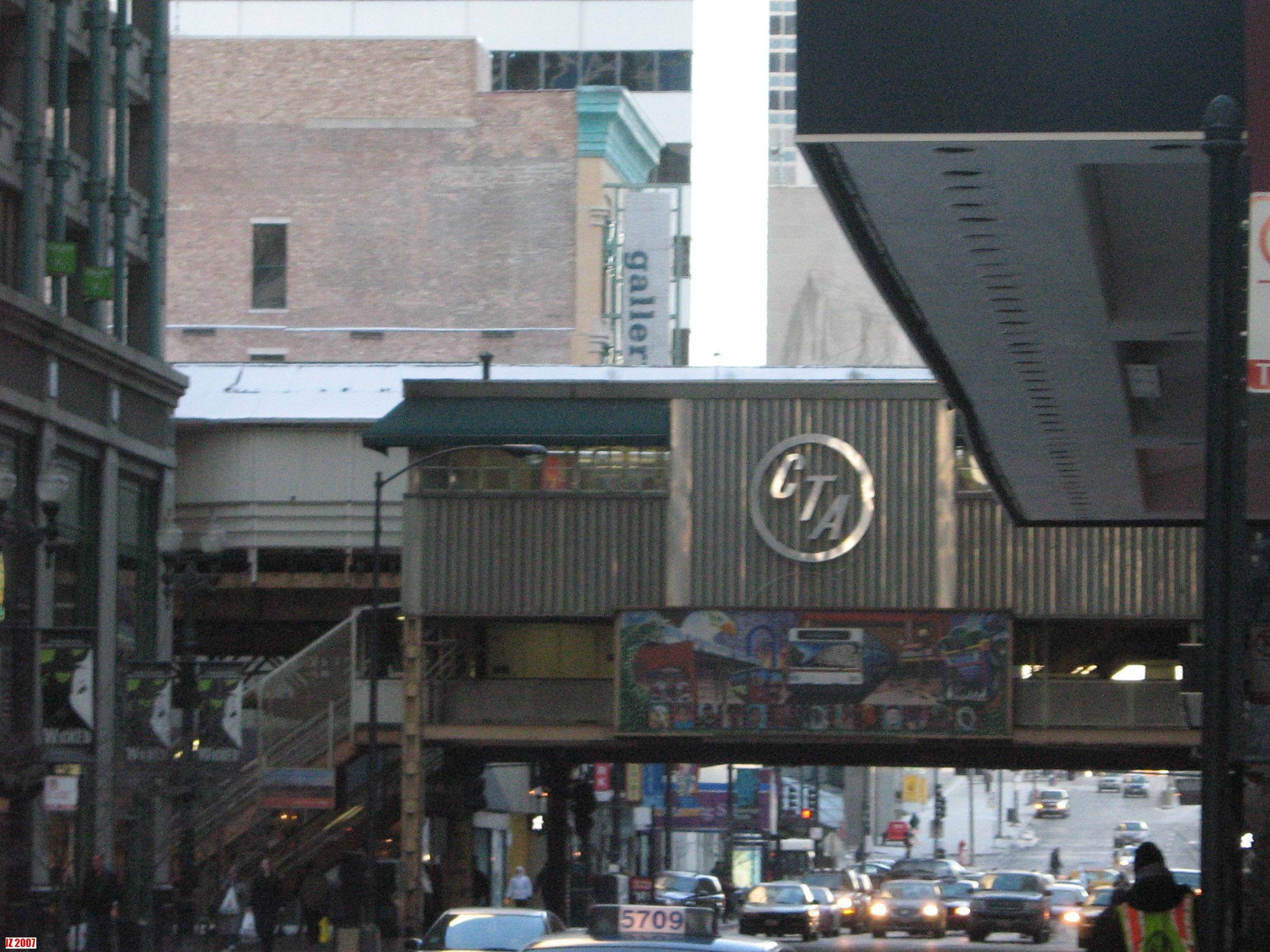
