= The Loop (CTA) =

Segment of the Chicago "L"

Coordinates: 41°52′48″N 87°38′47″W

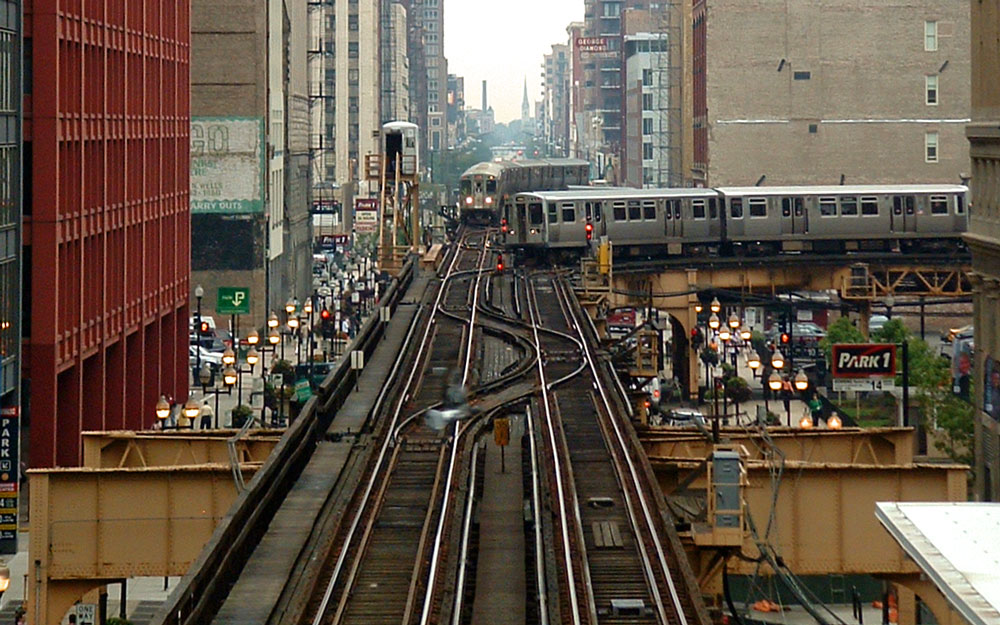
- A Brown Line train passes through Tower 12 as it makes the turn from Van Buren onto Wabash, while an Orange Line train waits for it to clear

Overview
- Status: Operational
- Locale: Chicago, Illinois, USA
- Stations: 8

Service
- Type: Rapid transit
- System: Chicago "L"
- Services: Orange Green Purple Brown Pink
- Operator: Chicago Transit Authority
- Daily ridership: 40,341 (average weekday April 2024)

History
- Opened: 1895–1897; 129 years ago

Technical
- Track length: 1.79 miles (2.9 km)
- Number of tracks: 2
- Character: Elevated
- Track gauge: 4 ft 8 1/2 in (1,435 mm) standard gauge
- Minimum radius: 90 feet (27 m)
- Electrification: Third rail, 600 V DC
Route map
The Loop highlighted in black

The Loop (historically Union Loop) is the 1.79-mile-long (2.88 km) circuit of elevated rail that forms the hub of the Chicago "L" system in the United States. As of April 2024, the branch served 40,341 passengers on an average weekday. The Loop is so named because the elevated tracks loop around a rectangle formed by Lake Street (north side), Wabash Avenue (east), Van Buren Street (south), and Wells Street (west). The railway loop has given its name to Chicago's downtown, which is also known as the Loop.

Transit began to appear in Chicago in the latter half of the 19th century as the city grew rapidly, and rapid transit started to be built in the late 1880s. When the first rapid transit lines opened in the 1890s, they were independently owned and each had terminals that were located immediately outside of Chicago's downtown, where it was considered too expensive and politically inexpedient to build rapid transit. Charles Tyson Yerkes aggregated the competing rapid transit lines and built a loop connecting them, which was constructed and opened in piecemeal fashion between 1895 and 1897, finally completing its last connection in 1900. Upon its completion ridership on the Loop was incredibly high, such that the lines that had closed their terminals outside of downtown had to reopen them to accommodate the surplus rush-hour traffic.

In the latter half of the 20th century, ridership declined and the Loop was threatened with demolition in the 1970s. However, interest in historic preservation increased in the 1980s, and ridership has stabilized since.

== Operations ==
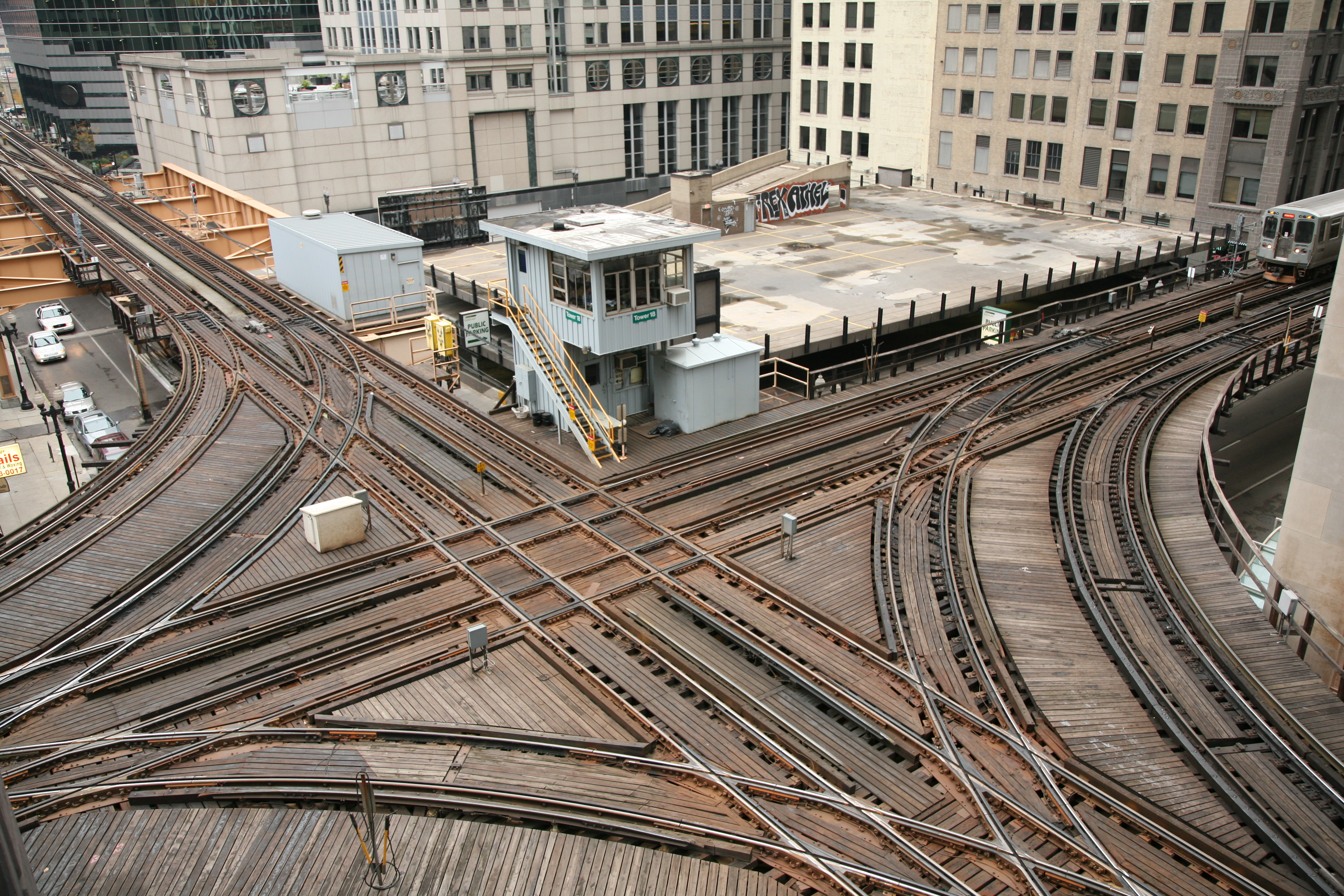
Chicago Transit Authority signal tower 18 controls traffic of Purple and Brown Line trains entering from and exiting to the north, Pink and Green Line trains entering and exiting to the west, and Orange Line trains remaining in the Loop above the Wells and Lake street intersection.

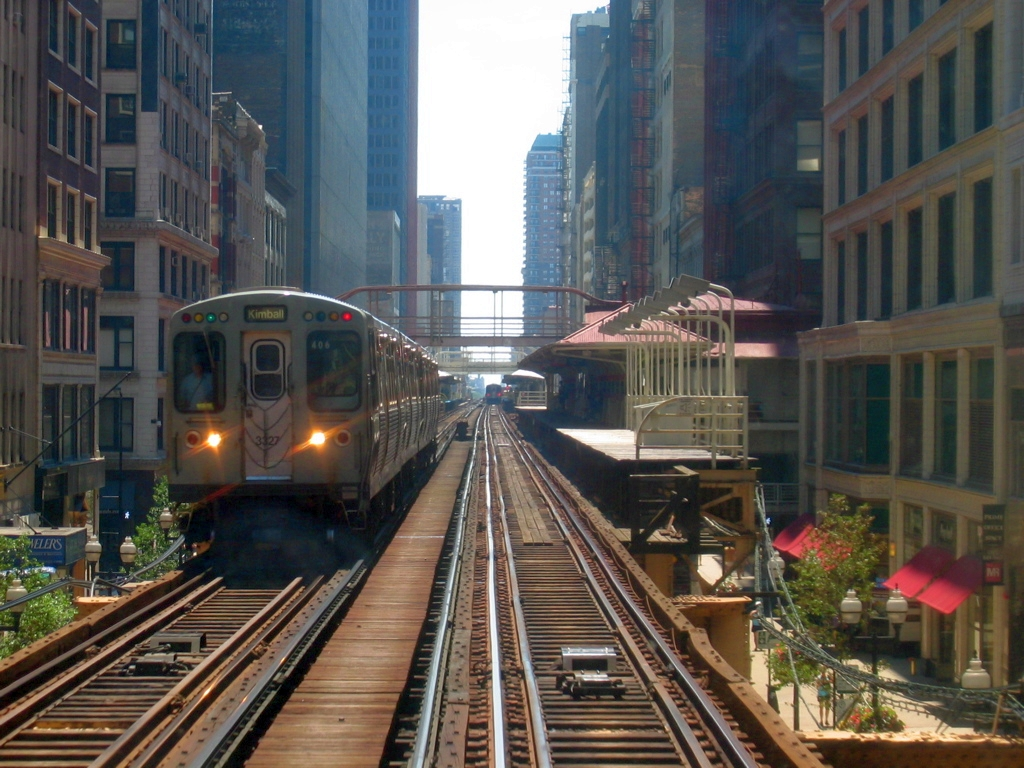
A Brown Line train departing from Madison/Wabash; the station was eventually demolished and replaced with Washington/Wabash

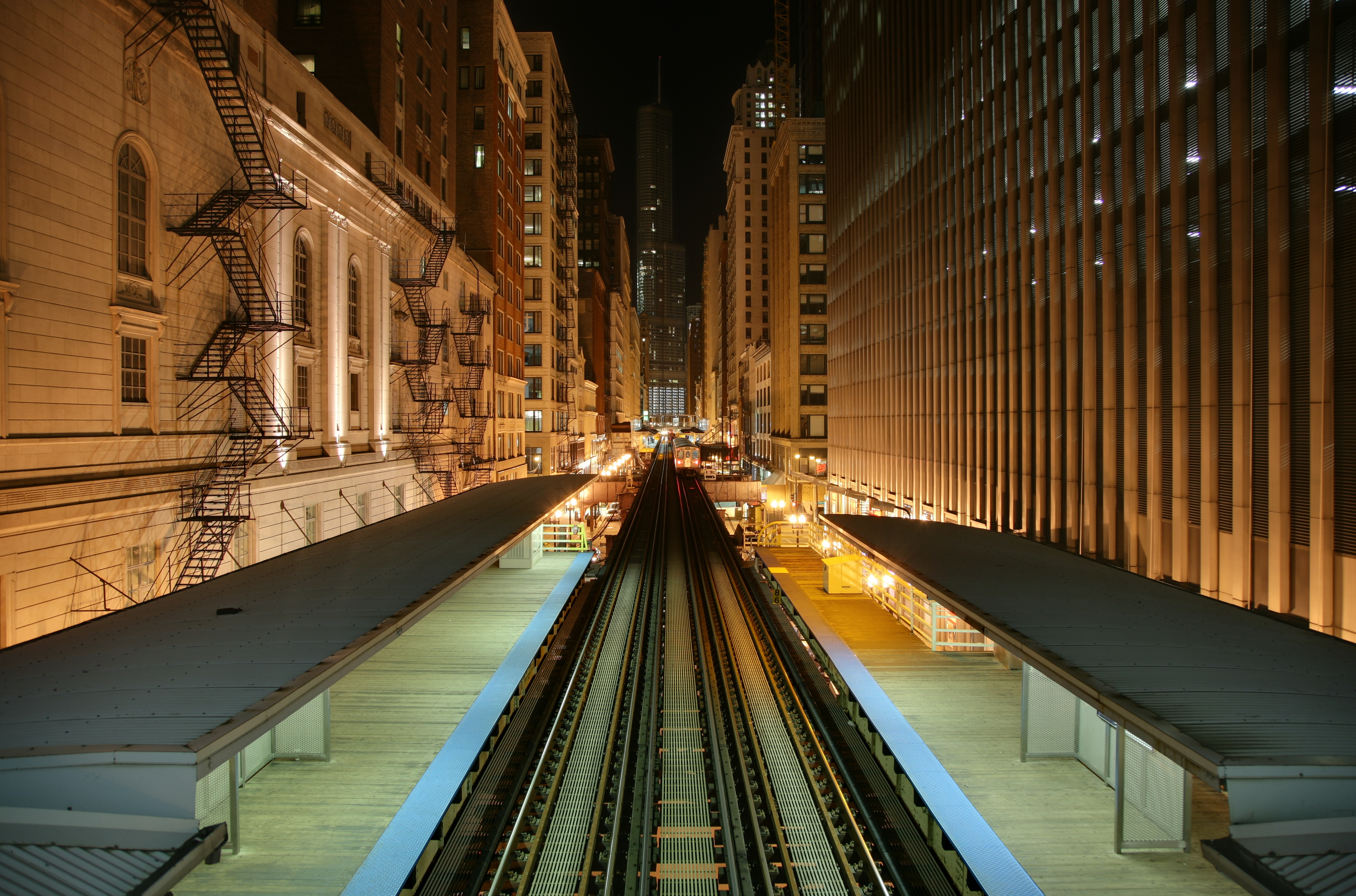
Northward view from the Adams/Wabash station at night

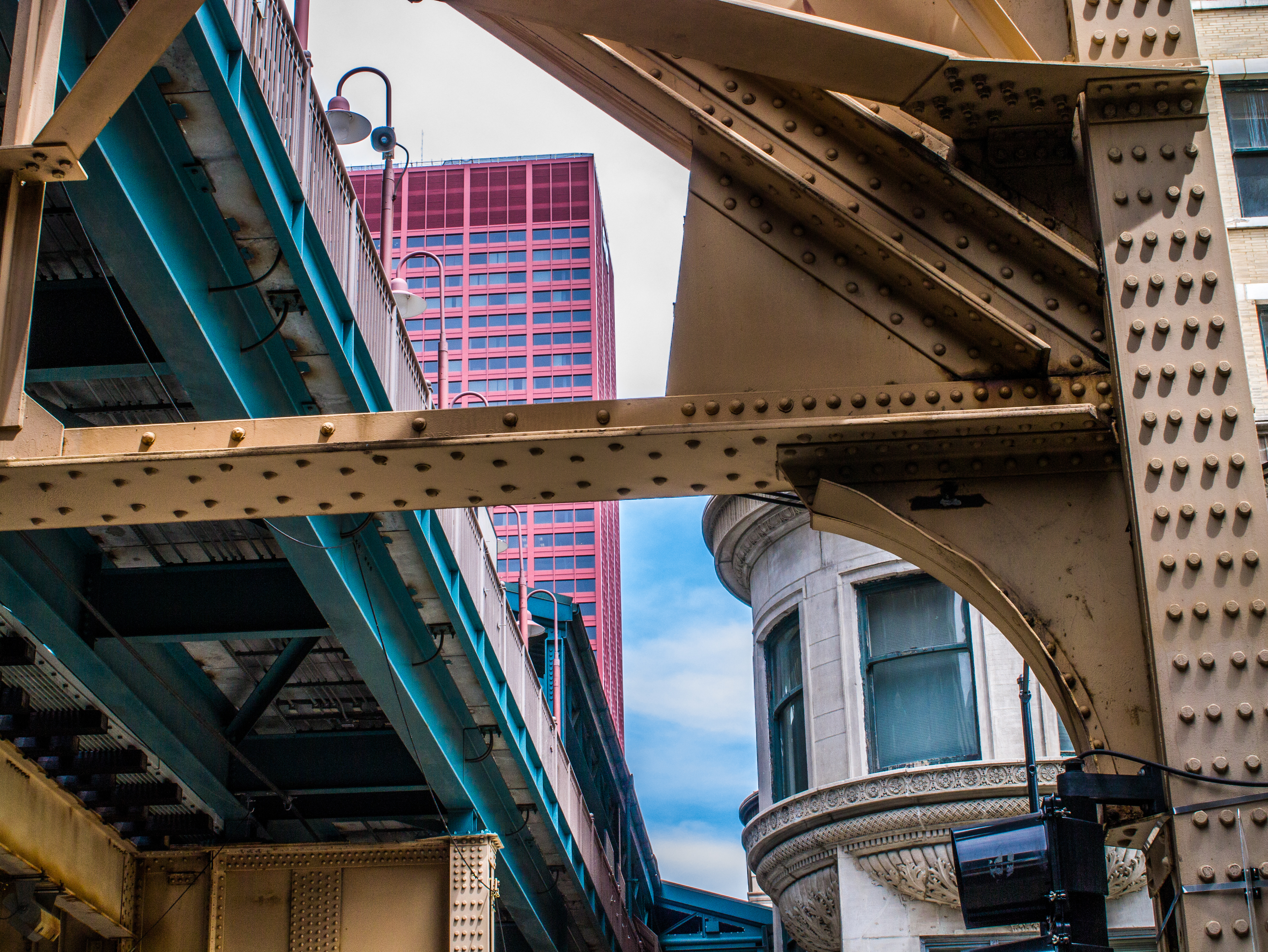
Loop Elevated, with CNA Center and Old Colony Building

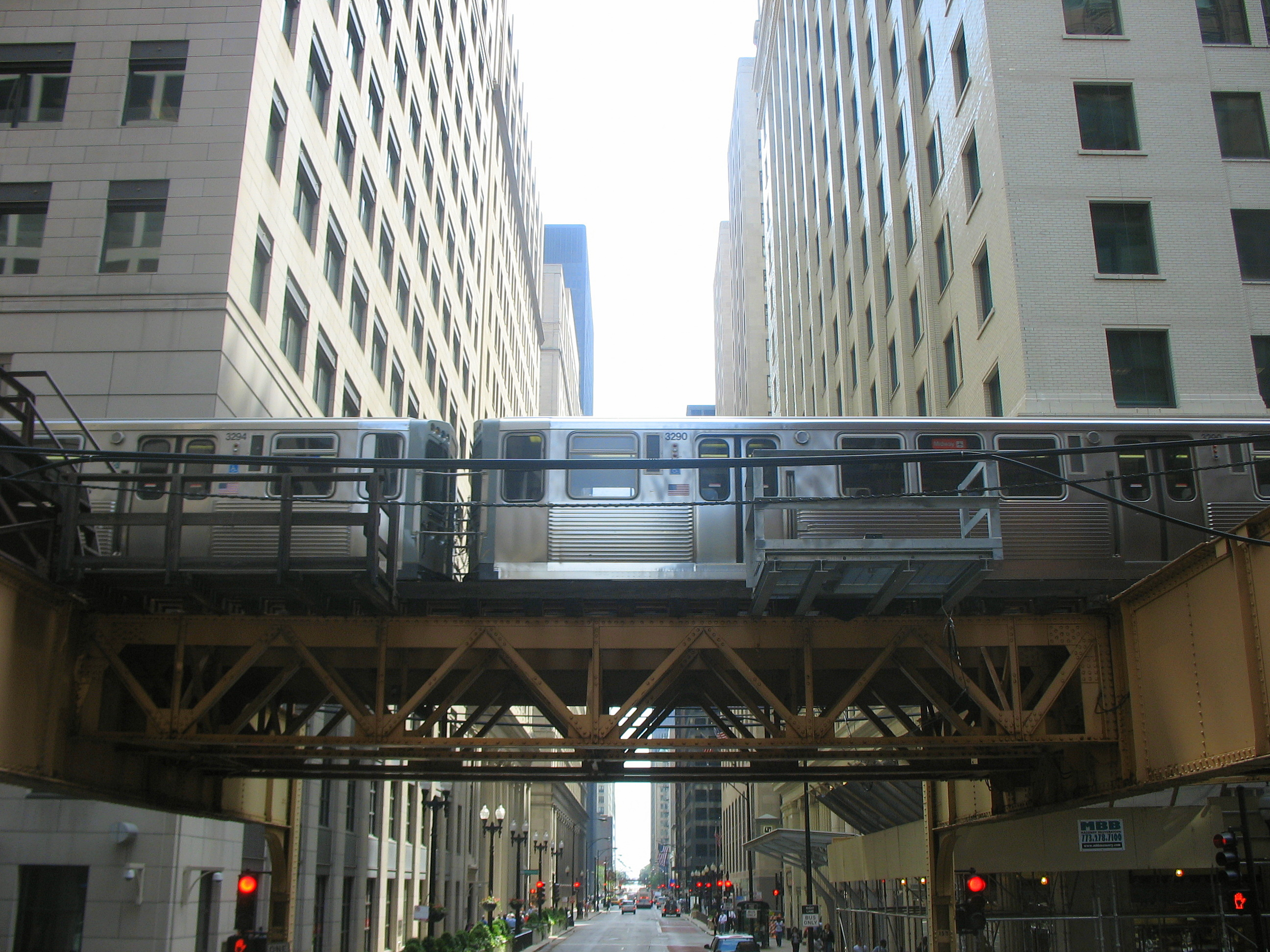
An Orange Line train approaches Quincy on the Wells Street portion of the Loop in 2008.

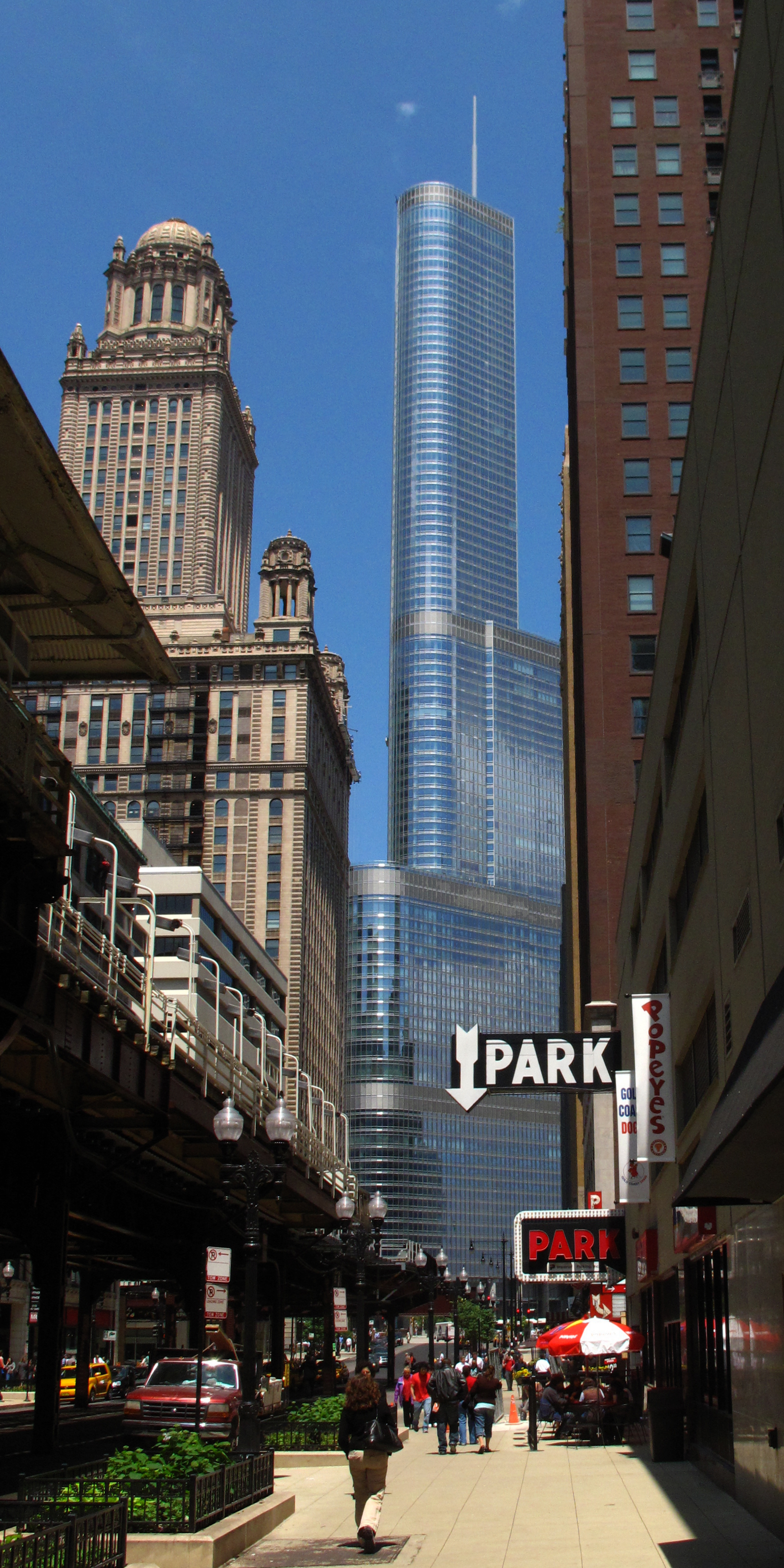
A street level view of Randolph/Wabash; like Madison/Wabash, this station was also demolished and replaced with Washington/Wabash.

The Loop includes eight stations: State/Lake and Clark/Lake are on the northern leg; Washington/Wells and Quincy are on the western side; LaSalle/Van Buren and Harold Washington Library – State/Van Buren are on the southern leg; and Adams/Wabash and Washington/Wabash are on the eastern side. In 2011, 20,896,612 passengers entered the 'L' via these stations.

Two towers control entry to and exit from the Loop. Tower 12 stands at the southeastern corner. Tower 18 stands watch over the three-quarter union located at the northwestern corner, which at one time was billed as the busiest railroad interlocking in the world. The current Tower 18 was placed into service on May 19, 2010, replacing the former tower on that site that was built in 1969.

Five of the eight 'L' lines use the Loop tracks:

- The Brown Line enters at Tower 18 on the northwest corner, terminating by making a full circuit counterclockwise around the Outer Loop. Following the completion of a full circuit back to Tower 18, trains return to their starting points.
- The Orange Line enters at Tower 12 on the southeast corner, while the Pink Line and Purple Line Express enter at Tower 18 on the northwest corner; all three lines terminate by traveling clockwise around the Inner Loop before returning to their starting points.
- The Green Line is the only line to use Loop trackage but not terminate on it. Its trains run in both directions along the Lake and Wabash sides from Tower 18 to Tower 12, connecting the Lake Street Elevated and the South Side Elevated.

In the CTA system, the entire loop taken as a whole is considered the termination point of a line, just like a single station or stop is considered the termination point when outside the downtown loop.

Both of the 'L' lines with 24-hour service, the Blue Line and the Red Line, run in subways through the center of the Loop, and have both in-system and out-of-system transfers to Loop stations. The Yellow Line is the only 'L' line that does not run on or pass beneath the Loop.

== History ==
When it was incorporated as a city in 1837, Chicago was dense and walkable, so there was no need for a transit system. Things began to change as Chicago grew rapidly in the 19th century.

Prior to construction of the Union Loop, Chicago's three elevated railway lines—the South Side Elevated Railroad, the Lake Street Elevated Railroad, and the Metropolitan West Side Elevated Railroad—each had their own terminal on the edges of downtown Chicago.

=== Construction of the Loop ===
The Union Elevated Railroad Company was incorporated November 1894 for the purpose of constructing a loop in the heart of the city's business district. With tense opposition from owners of abutting properties, extensive litigation ensued during the course of receiving approval to build the loop. Between January 8, 1894 and June 29, 1896 a series of ordinances were passed by the Chicago City Council enabling the construction of the Union Loop's route.

The Union Loop was constructed in separate sections: the Lake Street 'L' was extended along the north side in 1895; the Union Elevated Railroad opened the east side along Wabash Avenue in 1896 and the west side along Wells Street in 1897; and the Union Consolidated Elevated Railroad opened the south side along Van Buren Street in 1897.

The Loop opened on September 6, 1897.

The Loop was born in political scandal: upon completion, all the rail lines running downtown had to pay Yerkes's operation a fee, which raised fares for commuters; when Yerkes, after bribery of the state legislature, secured legislation by which he claimed a fifty-year franchise, the resulting furor drove him out of town and ushered in a short-lived era of "Progressive Reform" in Chicago.

Originally there were 12 stations, with three stations on each side. The construction of the west-leg of the Union Loop over Wells Street required the removal of the southern platform of the Fifth/Lake station. The addition of the Northwestern Elevated Railroad caused the removal of the rest of the station as the remaining platform sat across the new road's entry point. This left 11 stations, two on the north leg of the loop and three on each other leg.

Development of the Loop (diagrams)
1895–1897	1897–1900
WASSERq WASSERq; POINTERf@g uhCONTfaq uhBHFq uhSTRfq uhkSTR2+r uhkSTRc3 uhCONTgq uhSTRgq hkSTR-c1; uhSTR+r uhkSTR+4 uhSTRg uhSTRf uhBHF uhSTR2 uhSTR+hc3 uhSTRc1 uhABZg+4 uhKBHFe	WASSERq WASSERq; POINTERf@g uhCONTfaq uhSTRq uehBHFq uhSTRfq uhBHFq uhkSTR2+r uhkSTRc3 uhCONTgq uhSTR+r uhSTR+l uhSTRgq hkSTR-c1; uhSTR+r uhkSTR+4 uhBHF uhSTRg uhSTRf lhKRZh(g); lhSTR2+r(r); uSTRq; uSTR2 lhSTRl(l); lhSTRr(r); uABZlr; lhSTR3+l(l); uSTR3+l lhSTRr(r); lhSTR+r(r); lhSTR2(l); uSTR2; uABZr+r uhSTR3 uhSTRr+1 uhSTRl+4 uSTR; lhSTR+1(l); lhKRZh(r); uSTRr+1 uhSTR+4 POINTERg@f uhCONTf uhCONTge
1900–1913	1913–1931
uhCONTg uhCONTfa WASSERq uhKRZW uhCONTfaq uhKRZh uhABZql uhSTRfq uhBHFq uhkSTR2+r uhkSTRc3 uhCONTgq uhABZg+r uhSTR+l uhSTRgq hkSTR-c1; uhSTR+r uhkSTR+4 uhBHF uhSTRg uhSTRf lhKRZh(g); lhSTR2+r(r); uSTRq; uSTR2 lhSTRl(l); lhSTRr(r); uABZlr; lhSTR3+l(l); uSTR3+l lhSTRr(r); lhSTR+r(r); lhSTR2(l); uSTR2; uABZr+r uhSTR3 uhSTRr+1 uhSTRl+4 uSTR; lhSTR+1(l); lhKRZh(r); uSTRr+1 uhSTR+4 POINTERg@f uhCONTf uhCONTge	uhCONTfa uhCONTg WASSERq uhKRZW uhCONTgq lhKRZh(r); lhSTR2(l); uSTR; uSTR2+r uhSTRc3; uhSTRl uhSTRgq uhBHF-Rq uhBHFq uhkSTR2+r uhkSTRc3 uhCONTfaq lhKRZh(f); lhKRZh(r)(g); uSTRc1; uKRZ lhSTR+r(r); lhSTR+l(l); lhSTRl+4(l); uABZ+lr; uSTRl+4 uhBHF-Lq hkSTR-c1; uhSTR+r uhkSTR+4 uhBHF-L uhBHF-R uhSTRg uhSTRf uhBHF lhKRZh(g); lhSTR2+r(r); uSTRq; uSTR2 lhSTRl(l); lhSTRr(r); uABZlr; lhSTR3+l(l); uSTR3+l uhSTRfq uhSTRr uhSTR uhSTRr+1 uhSTRl+4 uhSTR+r POINTERg@f uhCONTf uhCONTge
1931–1949	1955-1958
uhCONTfa uhCONTg WASSERq uhKRZW uhCONTgq lhKRZh(r); lhSTR2(l); uSTR; uSTR2+r lhSTR3+l(l); lhSTR3(r); lhSTRl(l); uABZl+3g uhSTRgq uhBHF-Rq uhBHFq uhkSTR2+r uhkSTRc3 uhCONTfaq lhKRZh(f); lhKRZh(r)(g); uKRZ; uSTR+1 lhSTR+r(r); lhSTR+l(l); lhSTRl+4(l); uABZ+lr; uSTRl+4 uhBHF-Lq hkSTR-c1; uhSTR+r uhkSTR+4 uhBHF-L uhBHF-R uhSTRg uhSTRf uhBHF lhKRZh(g); lhSTR2+r(r); uSTRq; uSTR2 lhSTRl(l); lhSTRr(r); uABZlr; lhSTR3+l(l); uSTR3+l uhBHF-Rq; ulBHF-L uhSTRq; ulBHF-M; NULfq uhBHFq; ulBHF-M uhBHF-Rq; ulBHF-R uhSTRr; uhSTRc2 uhABZg3 uhSTRr+1 uhSTRl+4 uhBHF-Lq; ulBHF-L uhBHF-Lq; ulBHF-R lhSTRr+1(r); lhSTR+1(l); lhSTR+r(r); uABZr+1f uhSTR+hc4 POINTERg@f uhCONTf uhCONTge	uhCONTfa uhCONTg utCONTg WASSERq uhKRZW utKRZW uhCONTgq lhKRZh(r); lhSTR2(l); uSTR; uSTR2+r uhSTRc3; uhSTRl uhSTRgq uhBHF-Rq utTINTh; HUBa uhkSTR2+r uhkSTRc3 uhCONTfaq lhKRZh(f); lhKRZh(r)(g); uSTRc1; uKRZ lhSTR+r(r); lhSTR+l(l); lhSTRl+4(l); uABZ+lr; uSTRl+4 uhBHF-Lq utTINTh; HUB hkSTR-c1; uhSTR+r uhkSTR+4 uhINT-L; HUBaq uhINT-R; HUBq utCONTgq; HUBq utINTq; HUBeq utSTR+r utINT; HUBe uhSTRg uhSTRf utCONTf uhBHF uhBHF-L uhBHF-R uhSTR uhKRZh uhABZgr uhABZg+r uexhCONTgq lhKRZh(g); lhSTR2+r(r); uexSTRq; uSTR2 lhSTRl(l); lhSTRr(r); uexSTR3+l; lhSTR3+l(l); uABZlxr; uSTRc3 uhBHFq uhSTRfq uhSTRq uhSTRc2; uhSTRr uhABZg3 uexhCONTfaq uexhSTRr+1; uSTRc1 uhSTRl+4 uhBHFq; ulBHF-Lq lhSTRr+1(r); lhSTR+1(l); lhSTR+r(r); uABZr+1f uhSTR+hc4 uhCONTf uhCONTge
1958–1969	1969–1993
uhCONTfa uhCONTg WASSERq uhKRZW uhCONTgq lhSTR2(l); lhKRZh(r); uSTR; uSTR2+r uhSTRc3; uhSTRl uhSTRgq uhBHFq; lINT-Rq; HUBa uhBHFq uhkSTR2+r uhkSTRc3 uhCONTfaq lhKRZh(f); lhKRZh(r)(g); uSTRc1; uKRZ lhSTR+l(l); lhSTR+r(r); lhSTRl+4(l); uSTR+r; uSTRl+4 uhBHFq; lINT-Lq; HUB hkSTR-c1; uhSTR+r uhkSTR+4 uhBHF-L uhBHF-R utCONTgq utINTq; HUBe utSTR+r uhSTRg uhSTRf utLSTR uhBHF utCONTg utINT; HUBaq utINT; HUBlg uhkSTR2 hkSTR-c3; uhSTRl uhSTRfq utKRZh utTBHFh; lINT-Rq; HUB uhSTRc2; uhSTRr uxhABZg3 uhkSTRc1 uhkSTRl+4 utTBHFh; lINT-Lq; HUBe lhSTRr+1(r); lhSTR+1(l); lhSTR+r(r); uABZr+1xf uxhSTR+hc4 utSTRr utCONTf uexhCONTf uexhCONTge	uhCONTfa uhCONTg utCONTg WASSERq uhKRZW utKRZW uhCONTgq uhKRZh lhSTRl(l); lhKRZh(r); lhKRZh(l)(f); uKRZl uhSTRgq uhBHFq; lINT-Rq; HUBa utTINTh; HUBa uhkSTR2+r uhkSTRc3 uhCONTfaq lhKRZh(r); lhKRZh(l)(f); lhSTRl(l); uKRZl lhSTR+l(l); lhKRZh(r)(f); lhKRZh(g); uKRZ+xl uhSTRfq uhBHFq; lINT-Lq; HUB utTINTh; HUB hkSTR-c1; uhSTR+r uhkSTR+4 uhBHF-L uhBHF-R utCONTgq utINTq; HUBe utSTR+r utINT; HUBe uhSTRf uhSTRg utCONTf uhBHF uhkSTR2 hkSTR-c3; uhSTRl uhBHFq uhSTRq uehBHFq lhSTRr(r); lhSTR(l)+hc2; lhKRZh(r)(f); uSTRc2; uABZgr uhABZg3 uhkSTRc1 uhkSTRl+4 lhSTR+1(l); lhKRZh(r); uSTR; uSTRr+1 uhSTR+hc4 uhCONTf uhCONTge
1993–1997	1997–present
uhCONTfa uhCONTg utCONTg KWSTRaq uhKRZW WASSERq utKRZW KWSTReq uhCONTgq uhKRZh lhSTRl(l); lhKRZh(r); lhKRZh(l)(f); uKRZl uhSTRgq XPLTa; uhBHFq; lINT-Rq utTINTh; HUBa uhkSTR2+r uhkSTRc3 uhCONTfaq lhKRZh(r); lhKRZh(l)(f); lhSTRl(l); uKRZl lhSTR+l(l); lhKRZh(r)(f); lhKRZh(g); uKRZ+l uhSTRfq uhBHFq; lINTACC-Mq utTINTh; HUB hkSTR-c1; uhSTR+r uhkSTR+4 uehBHF-L uehBHF-R utCONTgq utSTRq; lINT-Lq utSTR+r utINT; HUBe uhSTRf uhSTRg utCONTf uhBHF uhINTACC-L uhINTACC-R uhBHF-L uhBHF-R uhINT-L uhINT-R uhkSTR2 hkSTR-c3; uhSTRl uhBHFq uhSTRq lhSTRr(r); lhSTR2(l); lhKRZh(r)(f); uSTR; uABZr+2g uhABZg3 uhkSTRc1 uhkSTRl+4 lhSTR+1(l); lhKRZh(r); uSTR; uSTRr+1 uhABZg+4 uhCONTf uhCONTge	uhCONTfa uhCONTg utCONTg KWSTRaq uhKRZW WASSERq utKRZW KWSTReq uhCONTgq uhKRZh lhSTRl(l); lhSTR+r(r); lhKRZh(l)(f); lhKRZh(r)(g); uKRZl+r uhSTRgq uhBHFq; lINT-Rq uetTINTACCh; HUBa uhkSTR2+r uhkSTRc3 uhCONTfaq lhSTRl(l); lhKRZh(l)(f); lhKRZh(r); uKRZl lhSTR+l(l); lhKRZh(g); lhKRZh(r)(f); uKRZ+l uhSTRfq uhSTRq; lINTACC-Mq uetTINTACCh; HUB hkSTR-c1; uhSTR+r uhkSTR+4 uhSTR utCONTgq utBHFq; lINT-Lq utSTR+r utINTACC; HUBe uhSTRf uhSTRg utLSTR uehBHF uhINTACC-L uhINTACC-R utLSTR; MFADEf uhACC-L uhACC-R utLSTR; MFADEg uehBHF-L uehBHF-R uhINT-L uhINT-R uhACC BLaq; utINTACC; HUBaq BLeq; utINTACC; HUBlg uhkSTR2 hkSTR-c3; uhSTRl uhBHFq utKRZh utKRZh; lINTACC-Rq; HUB lhSTRr(r); lhSTR2(l); lhKRZh(r)(f); uSTR; uABZr+2g uhABZg3 uhkSTRc1 uhkSTRl+4 utKRZh; lINTACC-Lq; HUBe lhSTR+1(l); lhKRZh(r); uSTR; uSTRr+1 uhABZg+4 utSTRr utCONTf uhCONTf uhCONTge

== Station listing ==
Chicago Transit Authority Chicago 'L' route map

This lists each station beginning at the northwest corner and moving counterclockwise around the loop: south along Wells Street, east along Van Buren Street, north along Wabash Avenue, and west along Lake Street.

Station	Location	Notes
Randolph/Wells	150 N. Wells St.	Closed July 17, 1995; partially demolished and replaced by Washington/Wells
Washington/Wells	100 N. Wells Street	
Madison/Wells	1 N. Wells St.	Closed January 30, 1994; demolished and replaced by Washington/Wells
Quincy	220 S. Wells Street	
LaSalle/Van Buren	121 W. Van Buren Street	
Dearborn/Van Buren	Dearborn Street and Van Buren Street	Closed 1949; demolished, replaced by Harold Washington Library-State/Van Buren on June 22, 1997.
Harold Washington Library – State/Van Buren	1 W. Van Buren Street	
Adams/Wabash	201 S. Wabash Avenue	
Madison/Wabash	2 N. Wabash Avenue	Closed March 16, 2015, demolished and replaced by Washington/Wabash.
Washington/Wabash	29 N. Wabash Avenue	Consolidation of Madison/Wabash and Randolph/Wabash, opened August 31, 2017.
Randolph/Wabash	151 N. Wabash Avenue	Closed September 3, 2017; demolished and replaced by Washington/Wabash.
State/Lake	200 N. State Street	Temporarily closed from 2026 - 2029
Clark/Lake	100 W. Lake Street, Chicago	
Fifth/Lake	Wells Street and Lake Street	Closed December 17, 1899; demolished

== See also ==
- Chicago Central Area Transit Plan
- History of the Loop (CTA)
- Wells Street Terminal
