= Adams/Wabash station =

Chicago "L" station

Adams/Wabash 200S 45E
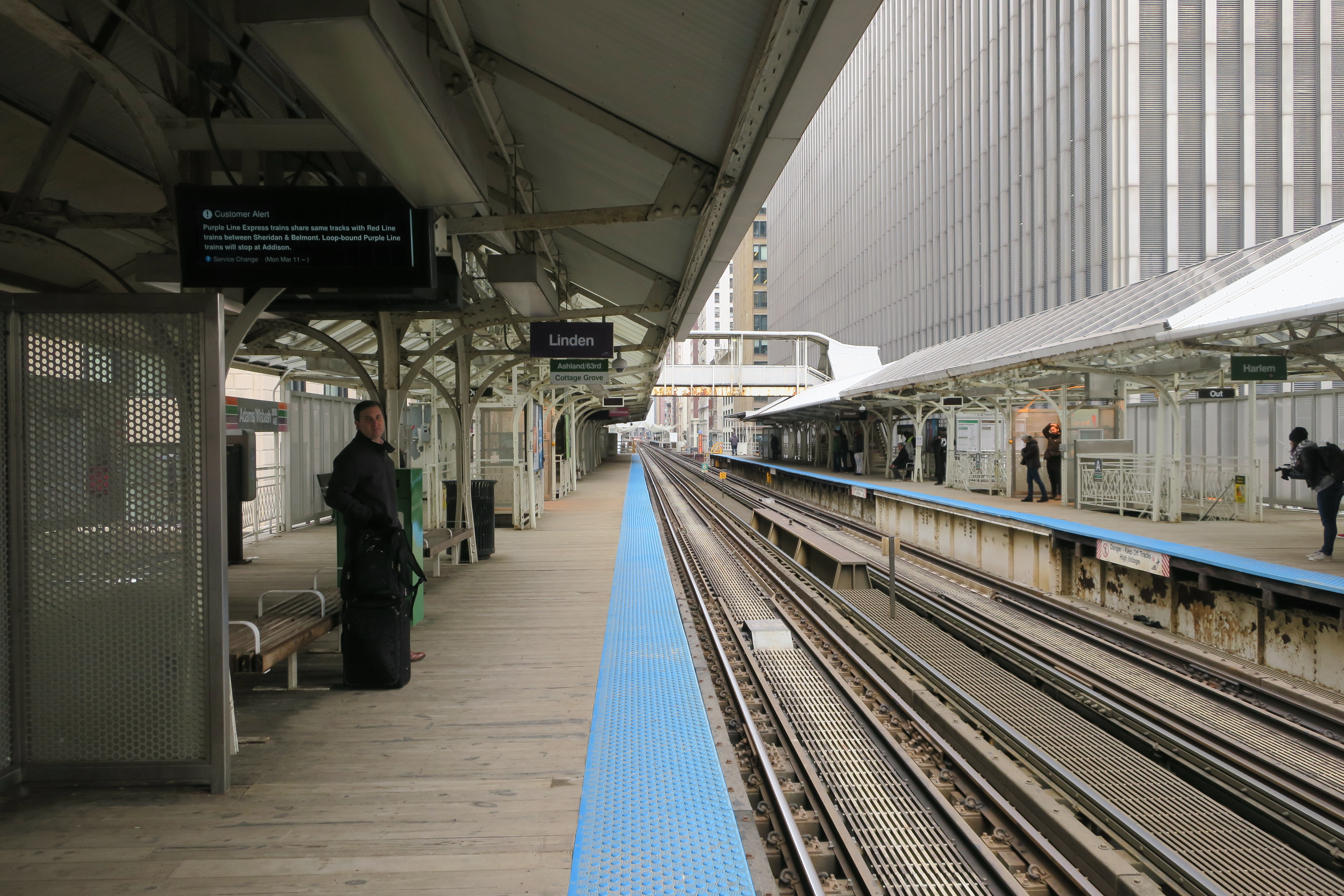
- Inner Loop platform

General information
- Location: 201–23 South Wabash Avenue; Chicago, Illinois 60604
- Coordinates: 41.8795°N 87.6261°W
- Owner: Chicago Transit Authority
- Line: Loop Elevated
- Platforms: 2 Side platforms
- Tracks: 2

Construction
- Structure type: Elevated
- Accessible: No

History
- Opened: November 8, 1896; 130 years ago
- Rebuilt: 1987–1989; 37 years ago

Passengers
- 2025: 1,456,362 ▲9.1%

Services
Preceding station	Chicago "L"	Following station
Washington/Wabash One-way operation	Orange Line	Roosevelt toward Midway
Washington/Wabash toward Harlem/Lake	Green Line	Roosevelt toward Ashland/63rd or Cottage Grove
Washington/Wabash One-way operation	Purple Line Express	Library toward Linden
Washington/Wabash One-way operation	Pink Line	Library toward 54th/Cermak
Washington/Wabash toward Kimball	Brown Line	Library One-way operation
Former services
Preceding station	Chicago North Shore and Milwaukee Railroad	Following station
Madison/Wabash toward Milwaukee	North Shore Line	Congress/Wabash Closed 1949 One-way operation
Preceding station	Chicago "L"	Following station
Madison/Wabash Closed 2015 One-way operation	Orange Line	Roosevelt toward Midway
Madison/Wabash Closed 2015 toward Harlem/Lake	Green Line	Roosevelt toward Ashland/63rd or Cottage Grove
Madison/Wabash Closed 2015 One-way operation	Purple Line Express	Library toward Linden
Madison/Wabash Closed 2015 One-way operation	Pink Line	Library toward 54th/Cermak
Madison/Wabash Closed 2015 toward Kimball	Brown Line	Library One-way operation
Madison/Wabash toward Harlem/Lake	Lake–Dan Ryan route	Cermak–Chinatown toward 95th/Dan Ryan
Track layout
Location

Adams/Wabash is an 'L' station serving the CTA's Brown, Green, Orange, Pink, and Purple Lines. Until 1963, it also served interurban trains of the Chicago North Shore and Milwaukee Railroad. It is the closest CTA station to Symphony Center, home of the Chicago Symphony Orchestra, and the Art Institute of Chicago.

== History ==
The station was opened on November 8, 1896, by Lake Street Elevated Railroad before being incorporated into Charles Yerkes's Union Loop in October 1897.

The station originally had separate ticket offices, one for each platform. The station houses were painted sheet metal similar to Madison/Wabash or Quincy stations with Corinthian pilasters and Baroque style window frames.

Each of the platforms was divided in half to create separate boarding areas for the two "L" companies serving the station. Passengers wishing to transfer between trains had to enter the station house and purchase a ticket for the other company. Transfers were simplified in 1913 and passengers were then able to access the entire platform with the same ticket.

In 1940, during the first renovation of the station, a footbridge was built over the tracks. In 1967 fare control was moved to the mezzanine below the tracks, replacing the original station houses on the platform level. Given the high traffic at the station, the two paths (below and above the tracks) have always coexisted.

In 1987, the mezzanine and the platforms were given a new makeover. Exit stairs and control booths were installed at each end of the platforms. The roof of the station was also replaced and extended on the platforms. This work lasted 2 years.

== Bus connections ==
CTA

- 1 Bronzeville/Union Station (weekday rush hours only)
- 7 Harrison (weekdays only)
- 28 Stony Island (weekday rush hours only)
- 126 Jackson
- 151 Sheridan
