= Halsted station (CTA North Side Main Line) =

HALSTED 1600N 800W
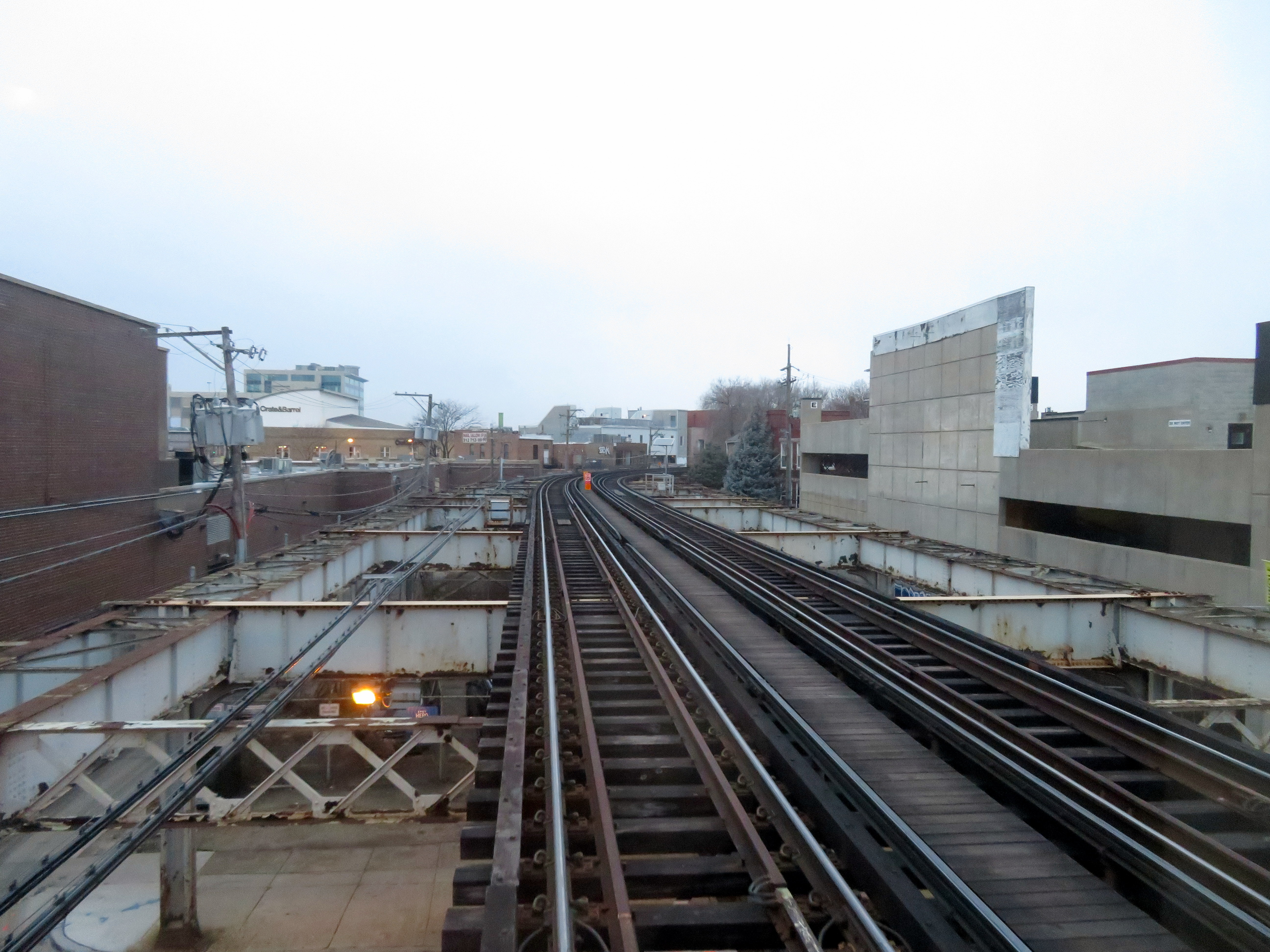
- The former station location seen in 2018

General information
- Location: 1618 North Halsted Street; Chicago, Illinois
- Coordinates: 41.9115°N 87.6483°W
- Owner: Chicago Transit Authority
- Line: North Side Main Line
- Platforms: 2 island platforms
- Tracks: 4 tracks

Construction
- Structure type: Elevated

History
- Opened: May 31, 1900; 126 years ago
- Closed: August 1, 1949; 77 years ago

Former services
| Preceding station | Chicago "L" | Following station |
|---|---|---|
| Willow Closed 1942 toward Howard | North Side main line | Larrabee toward Loop (Randolph/Wells) or North Water Terminal |
Location

Halsted was a station on the Chicago Transit Authority's North Side Main Line, which is now part of the Brown Line. The station was located at 1618 N. Halsted Street in the Lincoln Park neighborhood of Chicago. Halsted was situated south of Armitage (and, until 1942, south of Willow) and north of Larrabee, which closed at the same time as Halsted. It was one of only four "L" stations that were built on s-curves; Sheridan, Indiana, and Sacramento were the other three. The curve at Halsted Street and North Avenue was significant enough that a 1918 Chicago transit plan proposed realigning the Northwestern Elevated there to reduce "heavy curvature". Halsted opened on May 31, 1900, and closed on August 1, 1949, along with 22 other stations as part of a CTA service revision.
