= Sedgwick station (CTA) =

Chicago "L" station

Sedgwick 1600N 400W
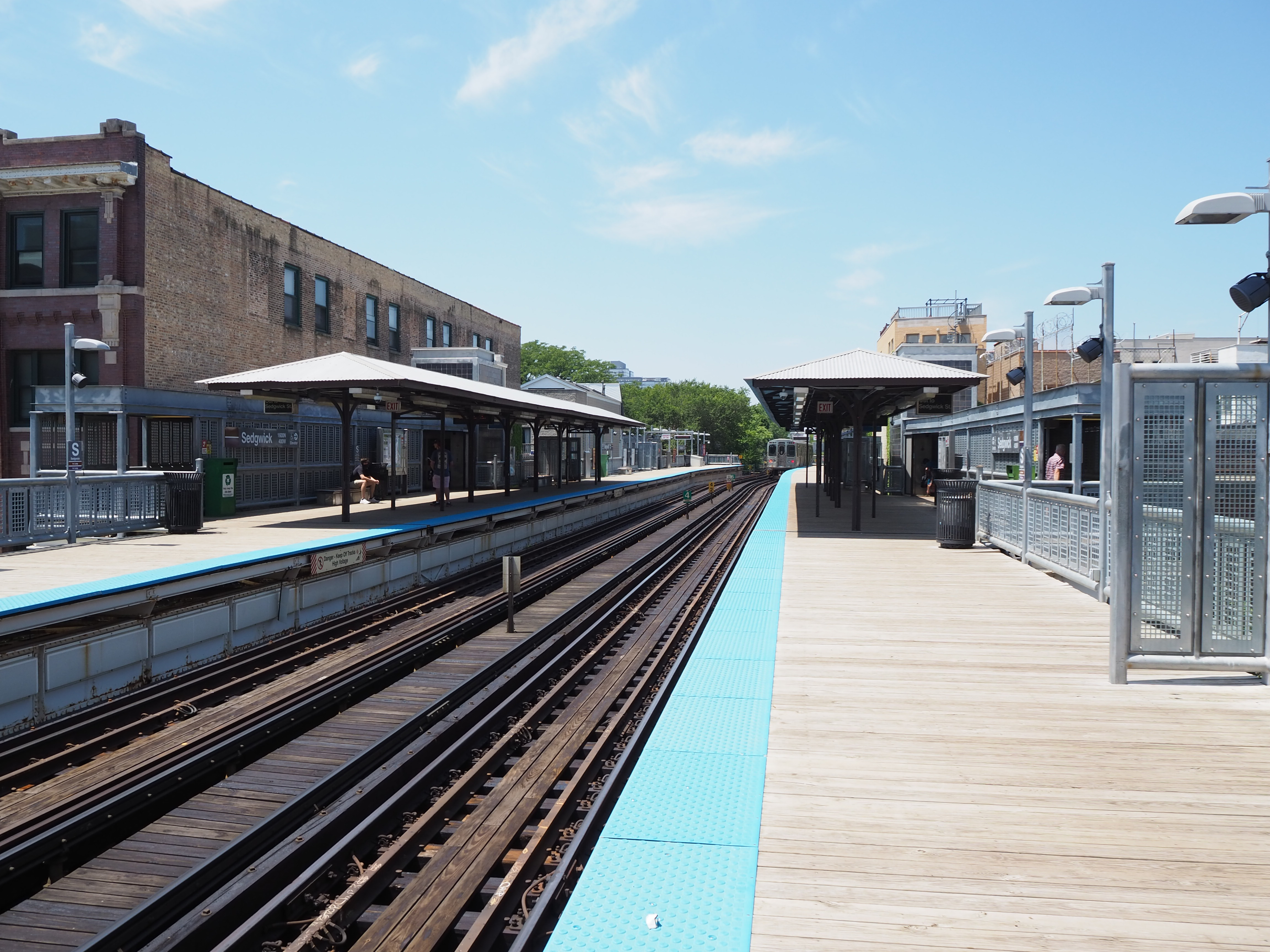

General information
- Location: 1536 North Sedgwick Street; Chicago, Illinois 60610
- Coordinates: 41.910397°N 87.638631°W
- Owner: Chicago Transit Authority
- Line: North Side main line
- Platforms: 2 side platforms (formerly 2 island platforms)
- Tracks: 2 (formerly 4)

Construction
- Structure type: Elevated
- Cycle facilities: Yes
- Accessible: Yes

History
- Opened: May 31, 1900; 126 years ago
- Closed: January 13, 1973; 53 years ago – April 23, 1973; 53 years ago
- Rebuilt: 2006–2007; 19 years ago

Passengers
- 2025: 852,239 ▲4.3%

Services
Preceding station	Chicago "L"	Following station
Armitage toward Kimball	Brown Line	Chicago toward Loop (Washington/Wells)
Armitage toward Linden	Purple Line Express	Chicago toward Loop (Clark/Lake)
Former services
Preceding station	Chicago "L"	Following station
Larrabee Closed 1949 toward Howard	North Side main line	Schiller Closed 1949 toward Loop (Randolph/Wells) or North Water Terminal
Track layout
Location

Sedgwick is an 'L' station on the CTA's Brown Line, Purple Line Express trains also stop at the station during weekday rush hours. It is an elevated station with two side platforms, located in Chicago's Old Town neighborhood of the Near North Side community area. The adjacent stations are Armitage, which is located about one mile (1.6 km) to the northwest, and Chicago, located about one mile (1.6 km) to the south.

== History ==
The station was put into service in 1900 as part of Northwestern Elevated Railroad's initial route, and it is one of the oldest standing stations on the 'L'.

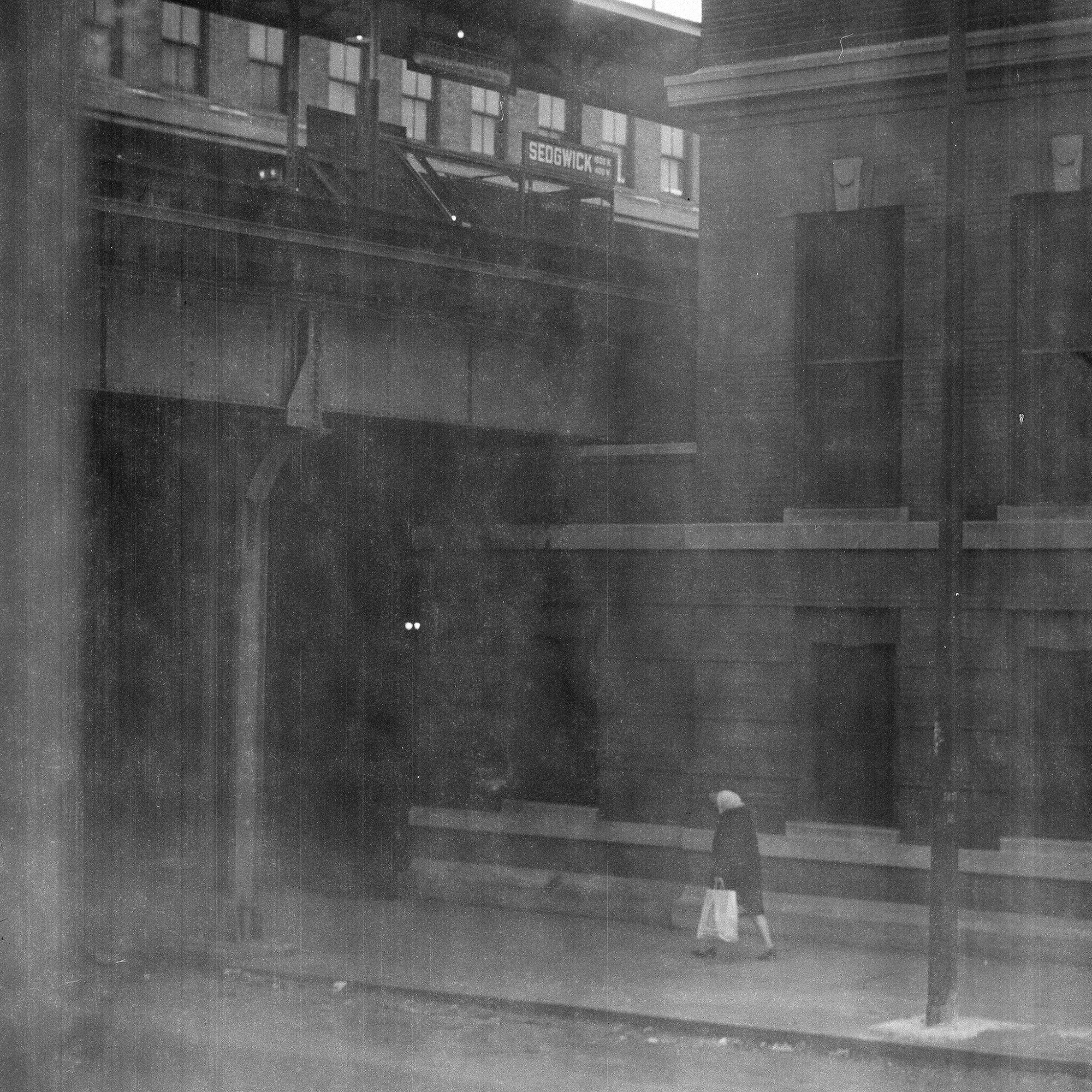
The station circa 1965

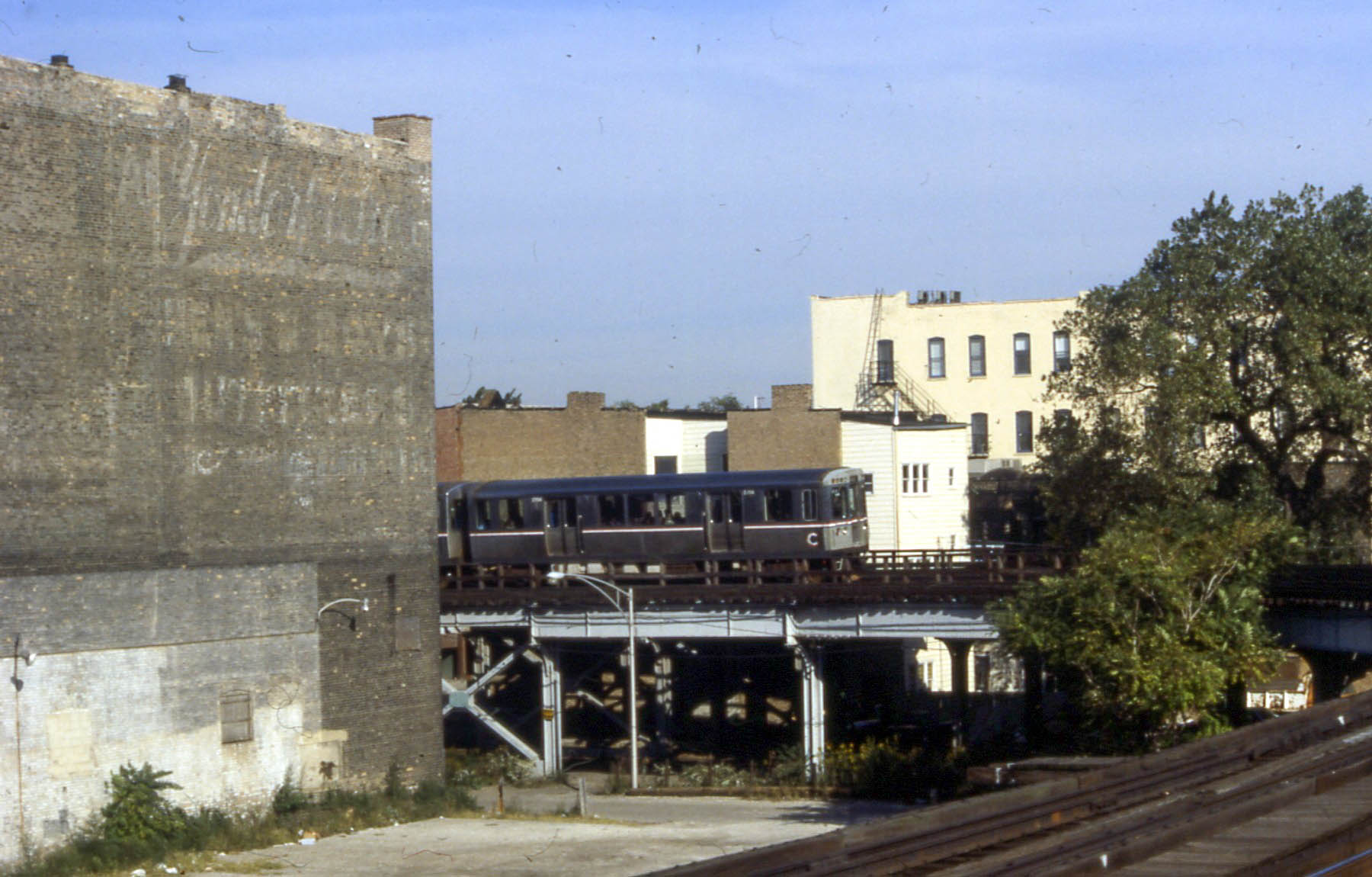
"L" train by the station in 1987

In 1979, a portion of The Hunter starring Steve McQueen was shot at Sedgwick as part of an action scene.

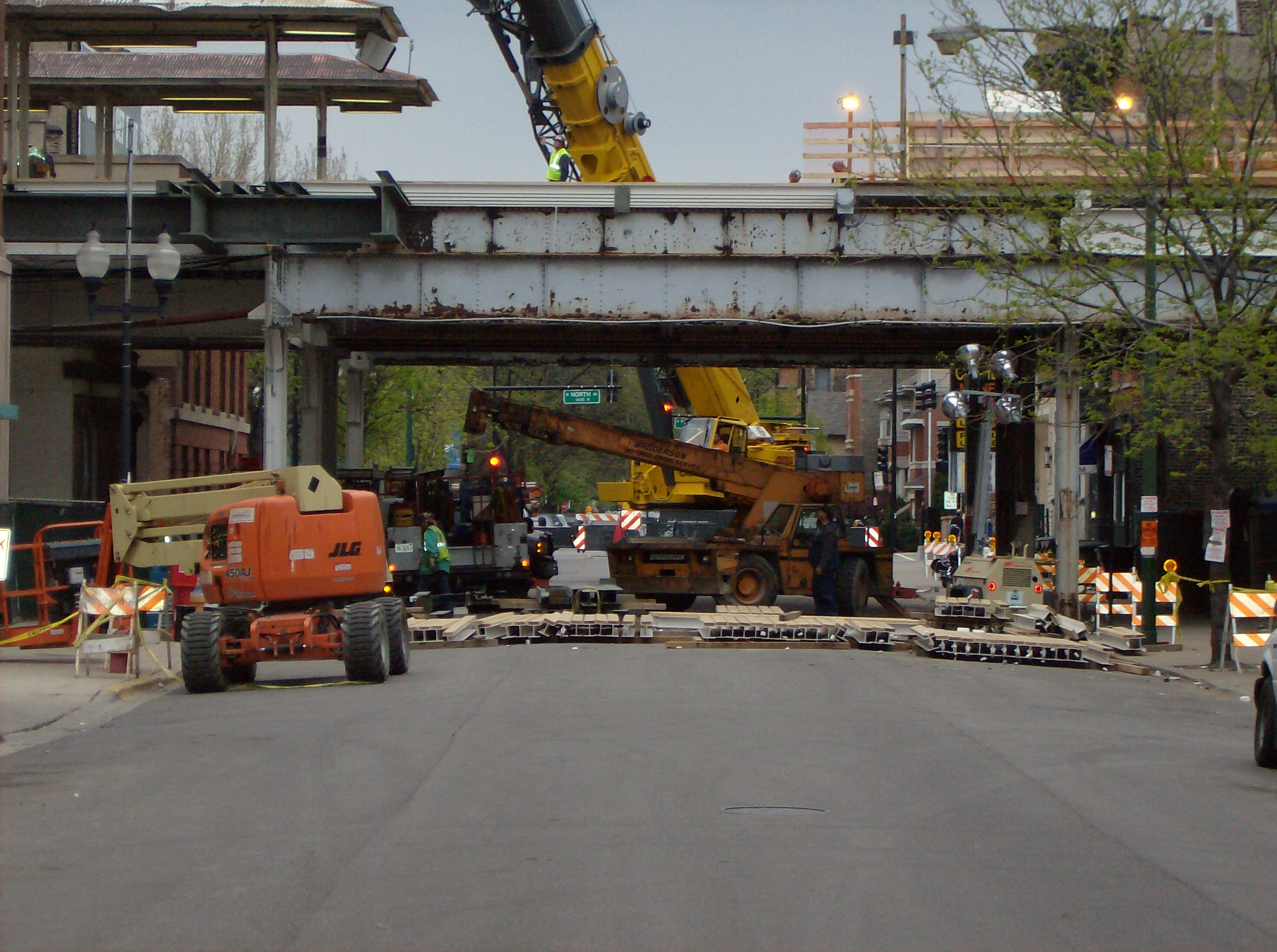
The station under reconstruction in 2007

During 2007, the main station entrance was closed for extensive renovation and rebuilding as part of the CTA's Brown Line capacity expansion project. Throughout the renovation period, the station remained open on weekdays but experienced several weekend closures, with entrance to the station through a temporary entrance (which was later converted to an emergency exit) located one block west of the original entrance at Hudson Avenue.

As the outside express tracks had not been in service since 1963 they were removed and island platforms widened, converting them to side platforms. The platforms were also extended to allow eight-car trains to berth, and elevators were added to make the station accessible to passengers with disabilities. The historical station house was restored, and an extension was added behind it.

== Bus connections ==
CTA

- N9 Ashland Night Bus (Owl Service)
- 37 Sedgwick (weekdays only)
- 72 North
