= Larrabee station =

LARRABEE 1600N 600W

General information
- Location: 1540 N. Larrabee Street; Chicago, Illinois
- Coordinates: 41.9104°N 87.6434°W
- Owner: Chicago Transit Authority
- Line: North Side Main Line
- Platforms: 2 side platforms
- Tracks: 4 tracks (2 express)

Construction
- Structure type: Elevated

History
- Opened: June 6, 1900; 126 years ago
- Closed: August 1, 1949; 77 years ago

Former services
Preceding station	Chicago "L"	Following station
Halsted toward Howard	North Side main line	Sedgwick toward Loop (Randolph/Wells) or North Water Terminal
Location

Larrabee, also known as Larrabee & Ogden, was a station on the Chicago Transit Authority's North Side Main Line, now part of the Brown Line. The station was located at 1540 N. Larrabee Street in the Near North Side neighborhood of Chicago. Larrabee was situated east of Halsted, which closed at the same time as Larrabee, and north of Sedgwick.

Larrabee opened on June 6, 1900, and closed on August 1, 1949, along with 22 other stations as part of a CTA service revision.
