= Willow station (CRT) =

Metro station in Chicago, Illinois, U.S.

WILLOW 1800N 1000W
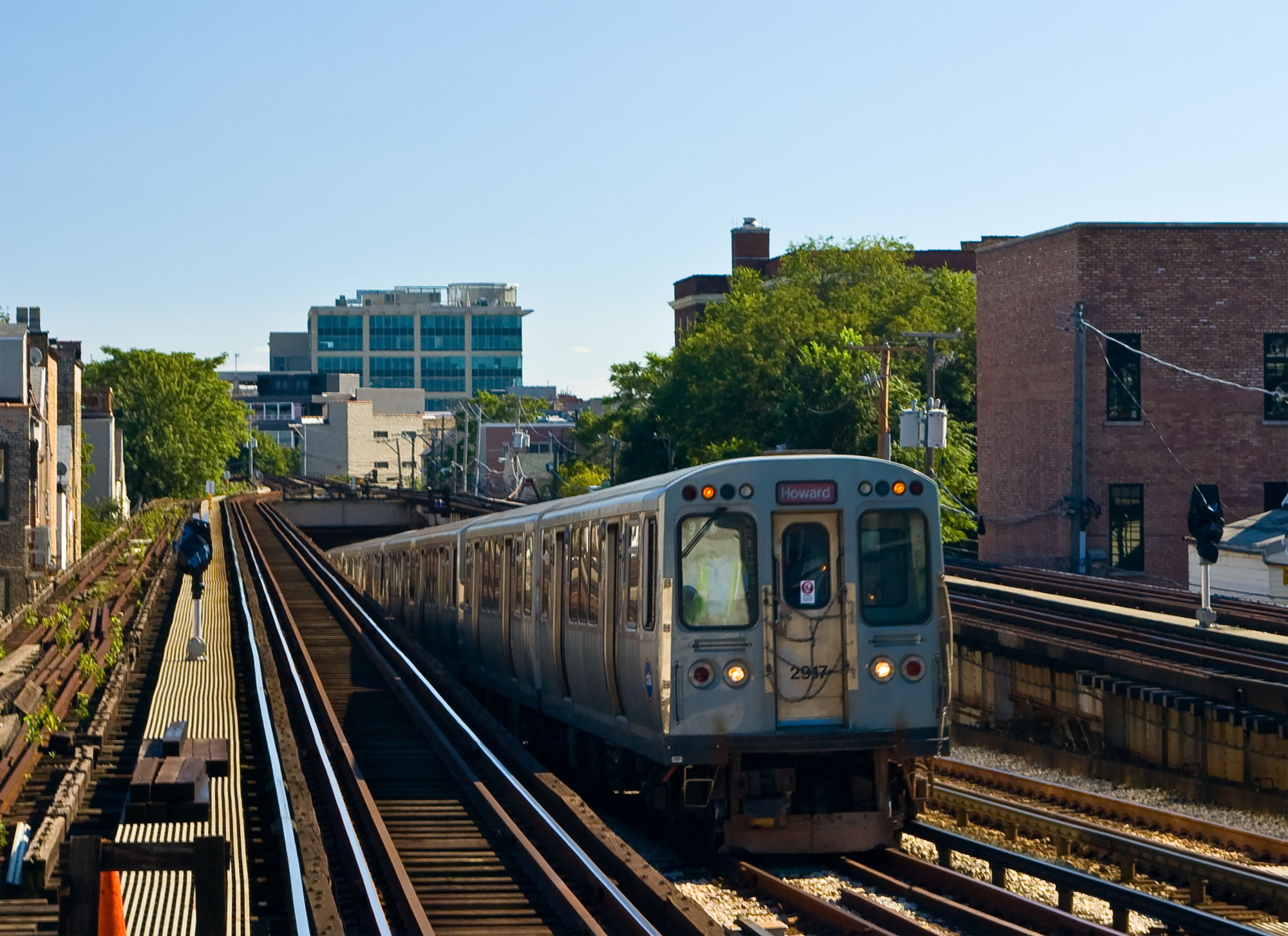
- The former site of the Willow station, now a portal to the State Street subway

General information
- Location: 940-44 W. Willow St. Chicago, Illinois
- Coordinates: 41.9145°N 87.6525°W
- Owner: Chicago Rapid Transit Company
- Line: North Side Main Line
- Platforms: 2 side platforms
- Tracks: 4 tracks (2 express)

Construction
- Structure type: Elevated

History
- Opened: 1905; 121 years ago
- Closed: May 17, 1942; 84 years ago

Former services
Preceding station	Chicago "L"	Following station
Armitage toward Howard	North Side main line	Halsted toward Loop (Randolph/Wells) or North Water Terminal
Location

Willow was a station on the Chicago Rapid Transit Company's North Side Main Line, which is now part of the Chicago Transit Authority's Brown Line. The station was located at 940-44 W. Willow Street in the Lincoln Park neighborhood of Chicago. Willow was situated south of Armitage and north of Halsted, which is now closed. Willow opened in 1905 and closed on May 17, 1942, to allow for the construction of a new portal to the State Street subway.
