= Division station (CTA North Side Main Line) =

DIVISION 1200N 400W

General information
- Location: 322 West Division Street; Chicago, Illinois 60610
- Coordinates: 41.90380°N 87.63705°W
- Owner: Chicago Transit Authority
- Line: North Side Main Line
- Platforms: 2 side platforms
- Tracks: 4 tracks (2 express)

Construction
- Structure type: Elevated

History
- Opened: May 31, 1900; 126 years ago
- Closed: August 1, 1949; 77 years ago

Former services
Preceding station	Chicago "L"	Following station
Schiller toward Howard	North Side main line	Oak toward Loop (Randolph/Wells) or North Water Terminal
Location

Division was a station on the Chicago Transit Authority's North Side Main Line, which is now part of the Brown Line. The station was located at 322 W. Division Street in the Near North Side neighborhood of Chicago. Division was situated south of Schiller and north of Oak, both of which closed at the same time as Division. Division opened on May 31, 1900, and closed on August 1, 1949, along with 22 other stations as part of a CTA service revision.
