= Addison station (CTA Red Line) =

Chicago "L" station

Addison 3600N 940W
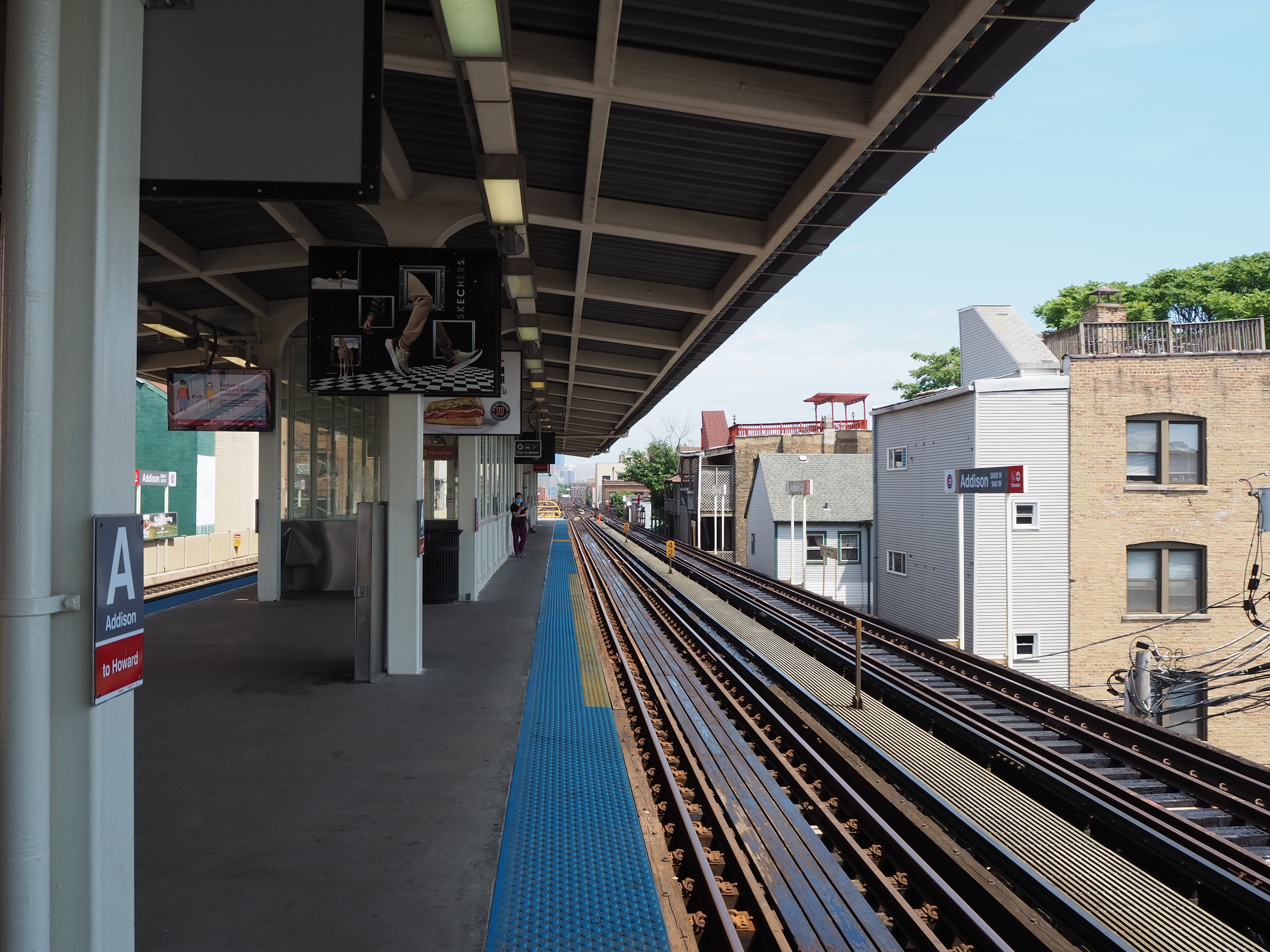

General information
- Location: 940 West Addison Street; Chicago, Illinois 60613
- Coordinates: 41.947462°N 87.653636°W
- Owner: Chicago Transit Authority
- Line: North Side Main Line
- Platforms: 1 island platform
- Tracks: 4

Construction
- Structure type: Elevated
- Cycle facilities: Yes
- Accessible: Yes

History
- Opened: June 6, 1900; 126 years ago
- Rebuilt: 1994

Passengers
- 2025: 2,090,546 ▲5.6%

Services
Preceding station	Chicago "L"	Following station
Sheridan toward Howard	Red Line	Belmont toward 95th/Dan Ryan
Purple Line does not stop here
Former services
Preceding station	Chicago "L"	Following station
Grace Closed 1949 toward Howard	North Side main line	Clark Closed 1949 toward Loop (Randolph/Wells) or North Water Terminal
Track layout
Location

Addison is a Chicago "L" station on the Chicago Transit Authority Red Line. It is located in the Wrigleyville area of the Lakeview neighborhood of Chicago, Illinois, at 940 West Addison Street with city block coordinates at 3600 North at 940 West. Addison directly serves Wrigley Field, home of Major League Baseball's Chicago Cubs. The station is within the shadow of the historic baseball stadium, which was built with convenient access to the "L" in mind.

Following Cubs games, this station can become heavily crowded; many fans often use the next station to the north, Sheridan. Purple Line weekday rush hour express service use the outside tracks but do not stop at this station.

== Transit art ==
Chicago artist Steve Musgrave has several murals featuring Cubs legends on display at the Addison station, which he adopted as part of the CTA's Adopt-A-Station program in 1998. Four large murals feature Cubs legends Billy Williams, Ferguson Jenkins, "Mr. Cub," Ernie Banks and Ryne Sandberg. A smaller painting of Harry Caray was added later.

Since 1998, Musgrave has also designed posters commemorating the annual Cubs–Sox crosstown series. Beginning in 2003, the CTA has also issued farecards featuring the poster design.

== Service ==
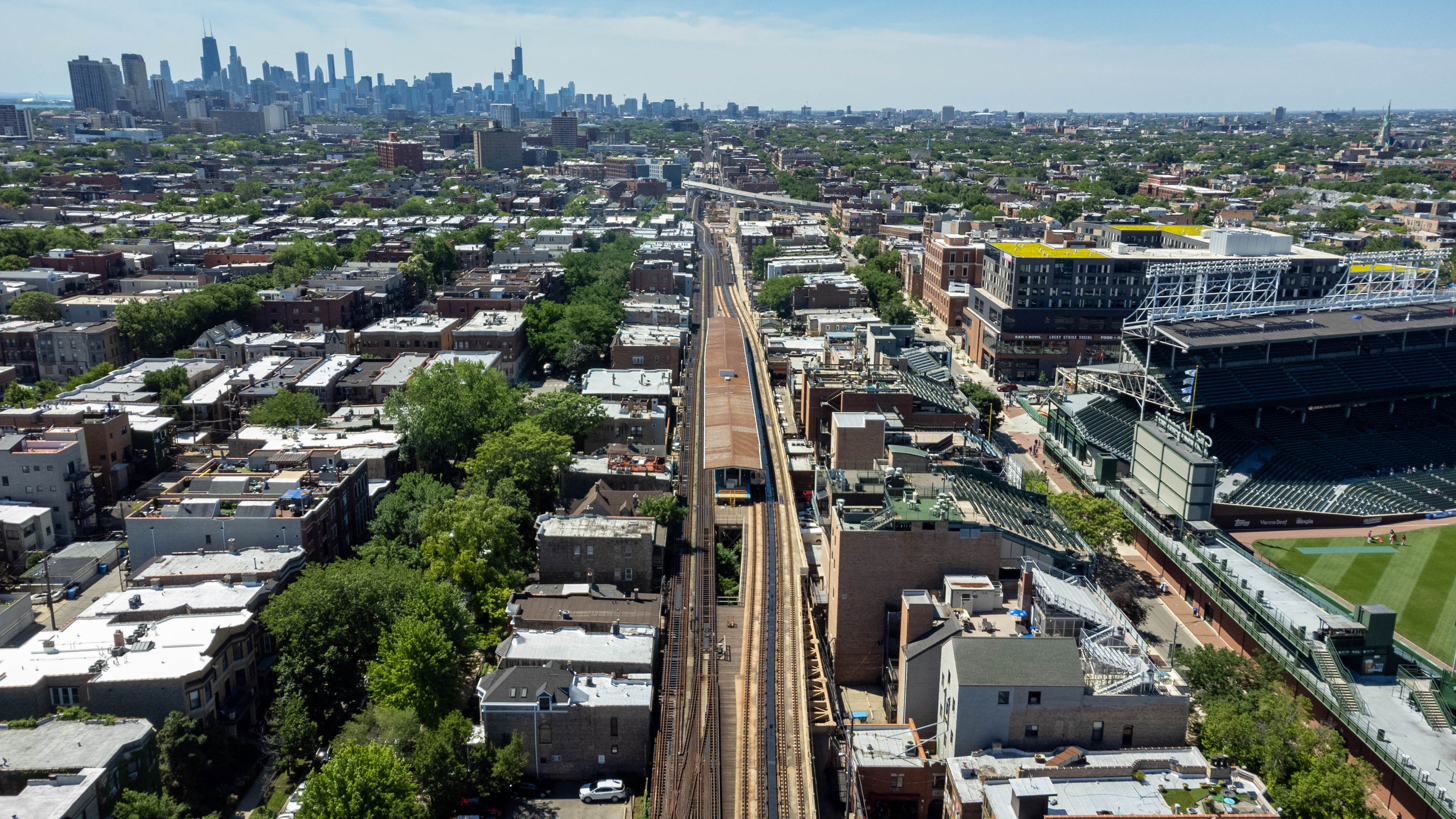
The station seen from an aerial view with Wrigley Field visible on the right.

Prior to 2007, southbound afternoon Purple Line Express trains stopped at the station before weekday evening Cubs games, to speed travel times for customers from Evanston, Skokie and Wilmette. In an effort to prevent delays due to Brown Line construction just south of the station, Purple Line Express trains now stop at the nearby Sheridan station instead.

From March 5, 2015 to March 21, 2016, AM Loop-bound Purple Line express trains shared 95th-bound Red Line tracks and stopped at Addison. This was due to the first phase of the Wilson station reconstruction.

== Bus connections ==
CTA

- 22 Clark (Owl Service)
- 152 Addison

Pace

- 282 Rolling Meadows–Wrigley Field Express
- 779 Hillside–Wrigley Field Express
