= Chicago station (CTA Brown and Purple Lines) =

Chicago "L" station

Chicago 800N 300W
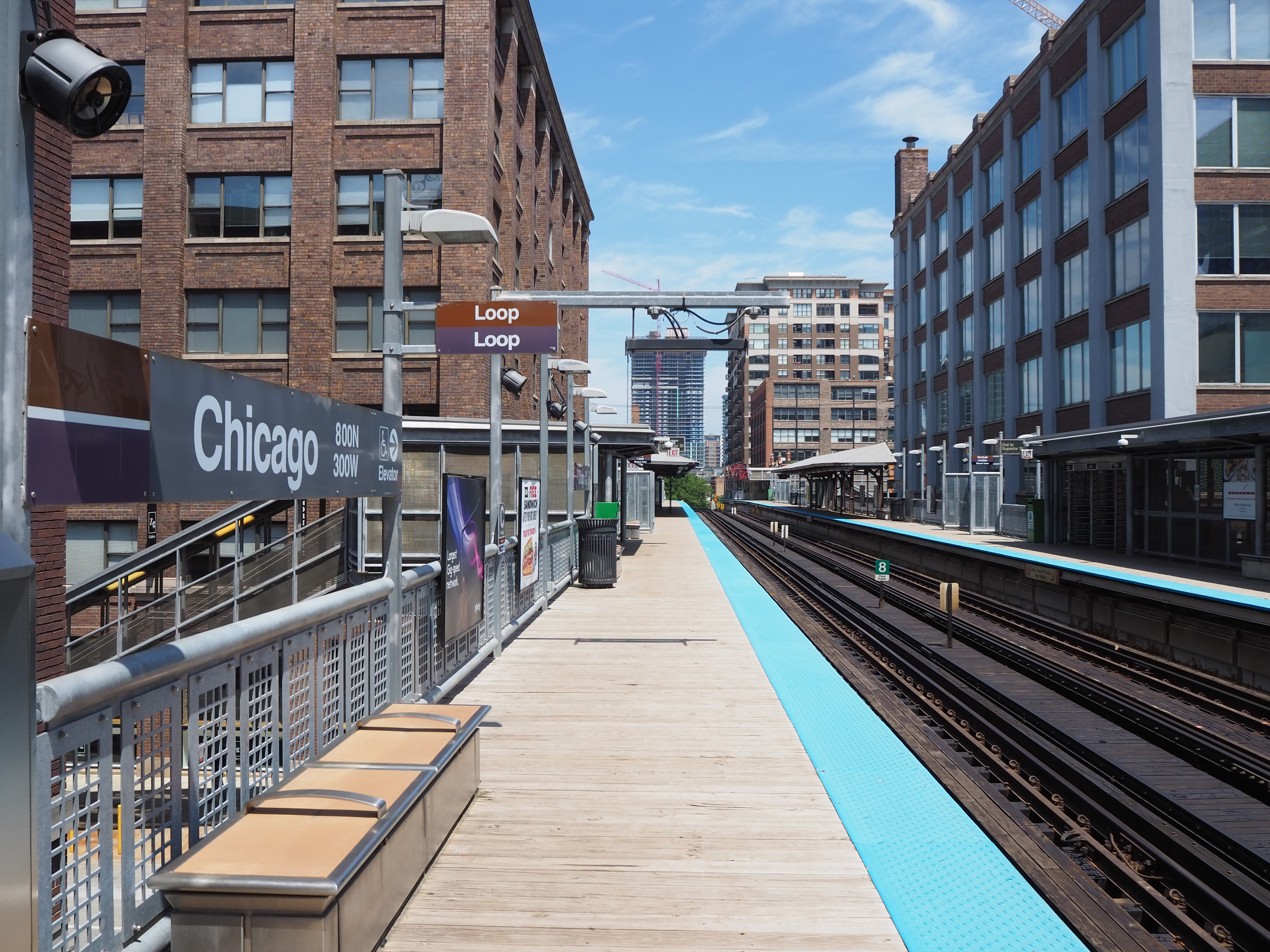

General information
- Location: 300 West Chicago Avenue; Chicago, Illinois 60610
- Coordinates: 41.896467°N 87.635833°W
- Owner: Chicago Transit Authority
- Line: North Side main line
- Platforms: 2 side platforms
- Tracks: 2

Construction
- Structure type: Elevated
- Accessible: Yes

History
- Opened: May 31, 1900; 126 years ago
- Rebuilt: 2006–2008; 18 years ago

Passengers
- 2025: 1,334,169 ▲6.9%

Services
Preceding station	Chicago "L"	Following station
Sedgwick toward Kimball	Brown Line	Merchandise Mart toward Loop (Washington/Wells)
Sedgwick toward Linden	Purple Line Express	Merchandise Mart toward Loop (Clark/Lake)
Former services
Preceding station	Chicago North Shore and Milwaukee Railroad	Following station
Belmont Avenue toward Milwaukee	North Shore Line	Grand Avenue toward Roosevelt Road
Preceding station	Chicago "L"	Following station
Oak Closed 1949 toward Howard	North Side main line	Grand Closed 1970 toward Loop (Randolph/Wells) or North Water Terminal
Oak Closed 1949 toward Linden	Northwestern Elevated Railroad	Kinzie Closed 1921 toward Loop (Randolph/Wells) or North Water Terminal
Track layout
Location

Chicago (Chicago/Franklin in station announcements) is an 'L' station on the CTA's Brown and Purple Lines. Located in the Near North Side neighborhood at 300 W Chicago Avenue at West Chicago Avenue and North Franklin Street in Chicago, Illinois (directional coordinates 800 North, 300 West), the station opened in 1900 as part of the original series of stations on the Northwestern Elevated. A high density of art galleries and several schools is in the vicinity of the station, including the Moody Bible Institute.

Chicago/Franklin serves the Brown Line, but Purple Line Express trains also stop at the station during weekday rush hours.

== Station layout ==
The original station house was on the north side of Chicago Avenue. Beyond the turnstiles were staircases which led up to the two long side platforms. The Chicago platforms were unusually long, starting just north of Chicago Avenue and curving along the track before straightening out just south of Chicago Avenue. Early in the station's history, it not only served 'L' trains but North Shore Line interurbans as well, requiring longer platforms which could berth eight car trains. The number of tracks also decreased from four to two just north of Chicago, meaning the two track, two side platform station had to provide the same capacity as a four track, two island platform station like Belmont (Red/Brown/Purple) or Fullerton. In the decades prior to the Brown Line Capacity Expansion Project, the northern, curved parts of the platforms were blocked off to passenger use; trains stopped south of Chicago Avenue along the straighter portion of the track which was long enough for eight-car trains. There were exit-only turnstiles to Superior Street on the south end of both platforms, along with an auxiliary exit to the south side of Chicago Avenue on the southbound platform.

Chicago/Franklin received major renovations as part of the Brown Line Capacity Expansion Project. The station houses were constructed above street level on the south side of Chicago Avenue alongside each platform. The original, historic station house was restored and used for support systems. The exits to Superior Street were also rebuilt and reconfigured: each exit now has multiple entrance/exit turnstiles and wider staircases leading down to Superior Street. The canopies were refurbished and moved south, over the operational part of the platform. Additionally, with the installation of elevators at each station house, the station is now accessible to passengers with disabilities.

== Bus connections ==
CTA

- 37 Sedgwick (weekdays only)
- 66 Chicago (Owl Service)

== See also ==
- Chicago/State
- Chicago/Milwaukee
