= Oak station (CTA) =

"L" station, open 1906–1949

OAK 1000N 400W

General information
- Location: 319 West Oak Street; Chicago, Illinois 60610
- Coordinates: 41.90050°N 87.63668°W
- Owner: Chicago Transit Authority
- Line: North Side Main Line
- Platforms: 2 side platforms
- Tracks: 4 tracks (2 express)

Construction
- Structure type: Elevated

History
- Opened: 1906; 120 years ago
- Closed: August 1, 1949; 77 years ago

Former services
| Preceding station | Chicago "L" | Following station |
|---|---|---|
| Division toward Howard | North Side main line | Chicago toward Loop (Randolph/Wells) or North Water Terminal |
Location

Oak was a station on the Chicago Transit Authority's North Side Main Line, which is now part of the Brown Line. The station was located at 319 W. Oak Street in the Near North Side neighborhood of Chicago. Oak was situated south of Division, which closed at the same time as Oak, and north of Chicago. Oak opened in 1906 and closed on August 1, 1949, along with 22 other stations as part of a CTA service revision.
