= Grand station (CTA North Side Main Line) =

Former station on the CTA North Side Main Line

GRAND 500N 200W

General information
- Location: Grand Avenue and Franklin Street; Chicago, Illinois
- Coordinates: 41.89155°N 87.63555°W
- Owner: Chicago Transit Authority
- Line: North Side Main Line
- Platforms: 2 side platforms
- Tracks: 2 tracks

Construction
- Structure type: Elevated

History
- Opened: 1921; 105 years ago
- Closed: September 20, 1970; 55 years ago

Former services
Preceding station	Chicago North Shore and Milwaukee Railroad	Following station
Chicago Avenue toward Milwaukee	North Shore Line	Merchandise Mart toward Roosevelt Road
Preceding station	Chicago "L"	Following station
Chicago toward Howard	North Side main line	Merchandise Mart toward Loop (Randolph/Wells) or North Water Terminal
Location

Grand was a station on the Chicago Transit Authority's North Side Main Line, which is now part of the Brown Line. The station was located at Grand Avenue and Franklin Street in the Near North Side neighborhood of Chicago. Grand was situated south of Chicago and north of Merchandise Mart. Grand opened in 1921 to replace the Kinzie station and closed on September 20, 1970, due to low ridership.

== Station details ==
=== Operations and connections ===
In 1921, Grand Avenue had a streetcar service from either Harlem Avenue or Western Avenue (cars alternated between them) in the west to Navy Pier in the east. By 1928, this route had owl service between 1 and 5 a.m., wherein cars ran once every thirty minutes; during the day, streetcar lines in Chicago typically had intervals of between eight and fifteen minutes per car. Service was cut back from Navy Pier on September 28, 1941. Buses began supplementing streetcar service to serve the Grand stations on the North Side Main Line and on the State Street Subway and relieve streetcar congestion, the service was extended to the entirety of the route on December 4, 1949; buses would replace streetcars altogether on April 1, 1951. Trains ran on the Grand Avenue tracks on occasion – motor-trailer trains ran between July 13, 1922, and May 4, 1923, and multiple-unit trains ran between November 18, 1926, and January 3, 1928.

== Works cited ==
- Lind, Alan R. (1974). Chicago Surface Lines: An Illustrated History. Park Forest, Illinois: Transport History Press.
