= Schiller station =

SCHILLER 1400N 400W

General information
- Location: 315 W. Schiller Street; Chicago, Illinois
- Coordinates: 41.90762°N 87.63720°W
- Owner: Chicago Transit Authority
- Line: North Side Main Line
- Platforms: 2 side platforms
- Tracks: 4 tracks (2 express)

Construction
- Structure type: Elevated

History
- Opened: May 31, 1900; 126 years ago
- Closed: August 1, 1949; 77 years ago

Passengers
- 1948: 164,006 ▲1.34% (CTA)
- Rank: 185 out of 223

Former services
Preceding station	Chicago "L"	Following station
Sedgwick toward Howard	North Side main line	Division toward Loop (Randolph/Wells) or North Water Terminal
Location

Schiller was a station on the Chicago Transit Authority's North Side Main Line, which is now part of the Brown Line. The station was located at 315 W. Schiller Street in the Near North Side neighborhood of Chicago. Schiller was situated south of Sedgwick and north of Division, which closed at the same time as Schiller. Schiller opened on May 31, 1900, and closed on August 1, 1949, along with 22 other stations as part of a CTA service revision.

== Ridership ==
In its last full year of service, 1948, Schiller served 164,006 riders, a 1.34 percent increase from the 161,830 riders of 1947. For the part of 1949 it was open, Schiller obtained a ridership of 90,157 patrons. Its 1947 performance made it the 196th-busiest station of the 222 on the Chicago "L" where ridership was recorded, whereas in 1948 it was the 185th-busiest of 223 such stations at the beginning of the year. (Note: Several stations on the Niles Center and Westchester branches were permanently unstaffed and thus did not collect ridership statistics. Several stations closed on the "L" during 1948. Exchange station on the Stock Yards branch lacked statistics for 1947 but returned in 1948.)

== Works cited ==
- CTA Rail Entrance, Annual Traffic, 1900–1979 (Report). Chicago: Chicago Transit Authority. October 1, 1979.
