= Armitage station =

Chicago "L" station

Armitage 2000N 1000W
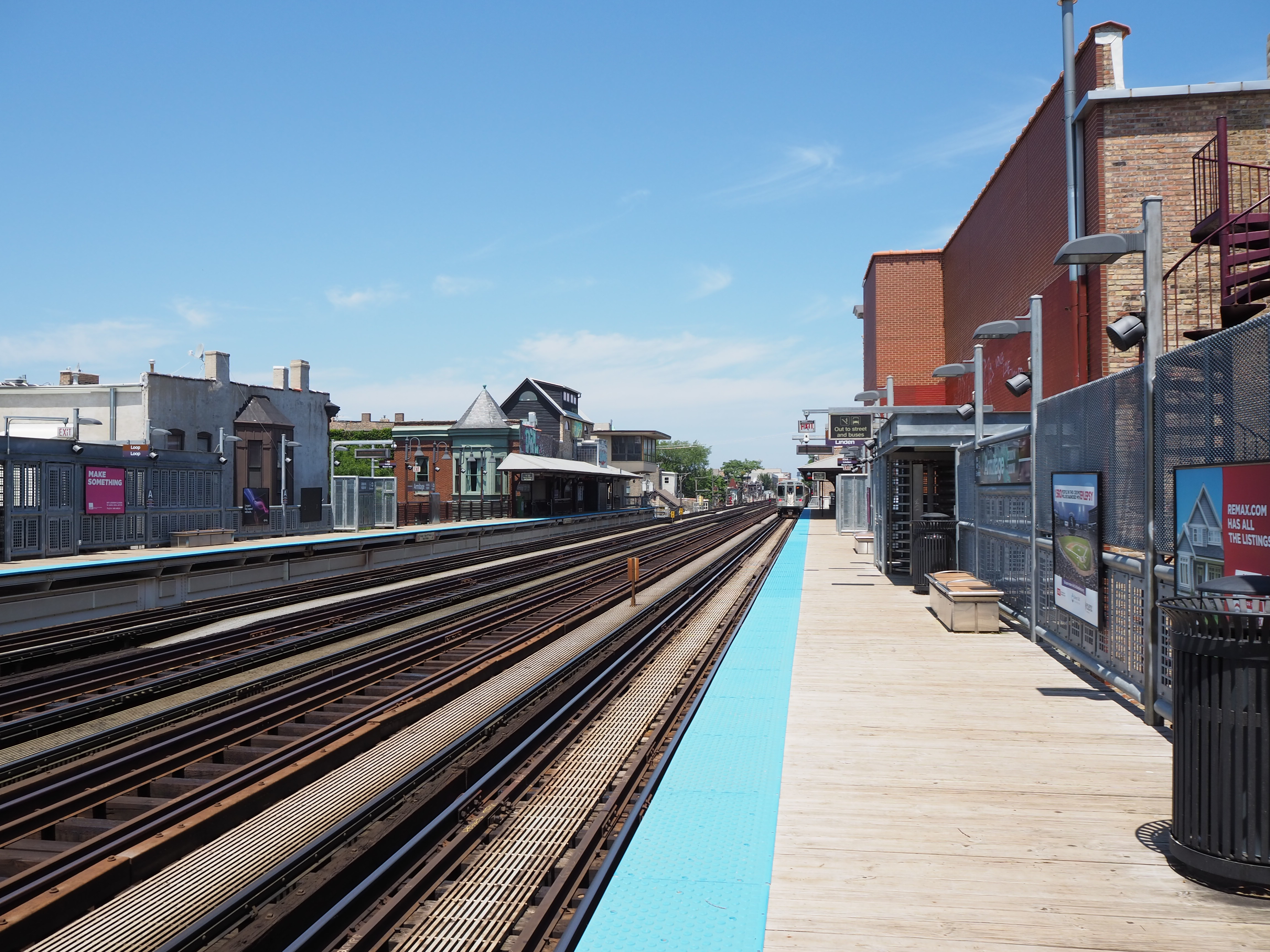

General information
- Location: 944 West Armitage Avenue; Chicago, Illinois 60614
- Coordinates: 41.918234°N 87.652659°W
- Owner: Chicago Transit Authority
- Line: North Side Main Line
- Platforms: 2 Side platforms
- Tracks: 4

Construction
- Structure type: Elevated
- Cycle facilities: Yes
- Accessible: Yes

History
- Opened: June 9, 1900; 126 years ago
- Rebuilt: 2006–2008; 18 years ago
- Former names: Center Street

Passengers
- 2025: 949,931 ▲12.5%

Services
Preceding station	Chicago "L"	Following station
Fullerton toward Kimball	Brown Line	Sedgwick toward Loop (Washington/Wells)
Fullerton toward Linden	Purple Line Express	Sedgwick toward Loop (Clark/Lake)
Red Line does not stop here
Former services
Preceding station	Chicago "L"	Following station
Webster Closed 1949 toward Howard	North Side main line	Willow Closed 1942 toward Loop (Randolph/Wells) or North Water Terminal
Track layout
Location

Armitage is a Chicago Transit Authority "L" elevated station with two side platforms in the Lincoln Park neighborhood of Chicago, Illinois, on the Brown Line; Purple Line express trains also stop at the station during weekday rush hours. Red Line trains pass through on the middle tracks, but do not stop. Just south of the platforms is where the Red Line tracks descend into the State Street subway. It is located near the Lincoln Park Zoo, and is accessible via the 73 Armitage bus route.

== History ==
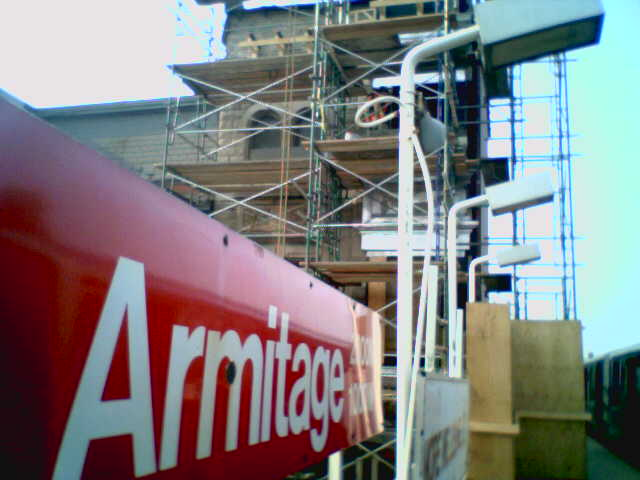
Armitage on May 29, 2007, under renovation. The red station sign was once used to identify Armitage as an "A" station when skip-stop was used.

Armitage opened on June 9, 1900 as a local station on the original Northwestern Elevated Railroad route from Lake and Wells in downtown to Wilson Station. An interlocking tower was added on the western platform following the construction of the State Street subway. From the late 1940s, Armitage became a station on the Ravenswood route (now the Brown Line). Purple Line express trains began stopping at the station in 1998 as part of an effort to help alleviate congestion on the Brown Line.

=== Brown Line Capacity Expansion Project ===
Armitage was renovated as part of the Brown Line Capacity Expansion Project. Many historic elements, including the station house, were preserved and renovated; the platforms were extended to enable eight-car trains; and elevators added to make the station accessible to passengers with disabilities. The renovated station reopened on June 5, 2008.

== Bus connections ==
CTA

- 73 Armitage
