= Chicago (CTA) =

The Chicago Transit Authority (CTA) operates three separate stations on its rapid transit service that are referred to as "Chicago", as they are located on or near Chicago Avenue. Chicago (CTA) may refer to:

- Chicago/State
- Chicago/Milwaukee
- Chicago/Franklin

== See also ==
- Chicago (disambiguation)
