= Grace station =

GRACE 3800N 1000W

General information
- Location: Grace Street and Sheffield Avenue; Chicago, Illinois
- Coordinates: 41.9511°N 87.6537°W
- Owner: Chicago Transit Authority
- Line: Howard Line
- Platforms: 2 side platforms
- Tracks: 4 tracks

Construction
- Structure type: Elevated

History
- Opened: June 7, 1900
- Closed: August 1, 1949

Former services
| Preceding station | Chicago "L" | Following station |
|---|---|---|
| Sheridan toward Howard | North Side main line | Addison toward Loop (Randolph/Wells) or North Water Terminal |
Location

Grace was a station on the Chicago Transit Authority's Howard Line, which is now part of the Red Line. The station was located at Grace Street and Sheffield Avenue in the Lakeview neighborhood of Chicago. Grace was situated north of Addison and south of Sheridan. Grace opened on June 7, 1900, and closed on August 1, 1949, along with 22 other stations as part of a CTA service revision.
