= Merchandise Mart station =

Chicago "L" station

Merchandise Mart 320N 200W
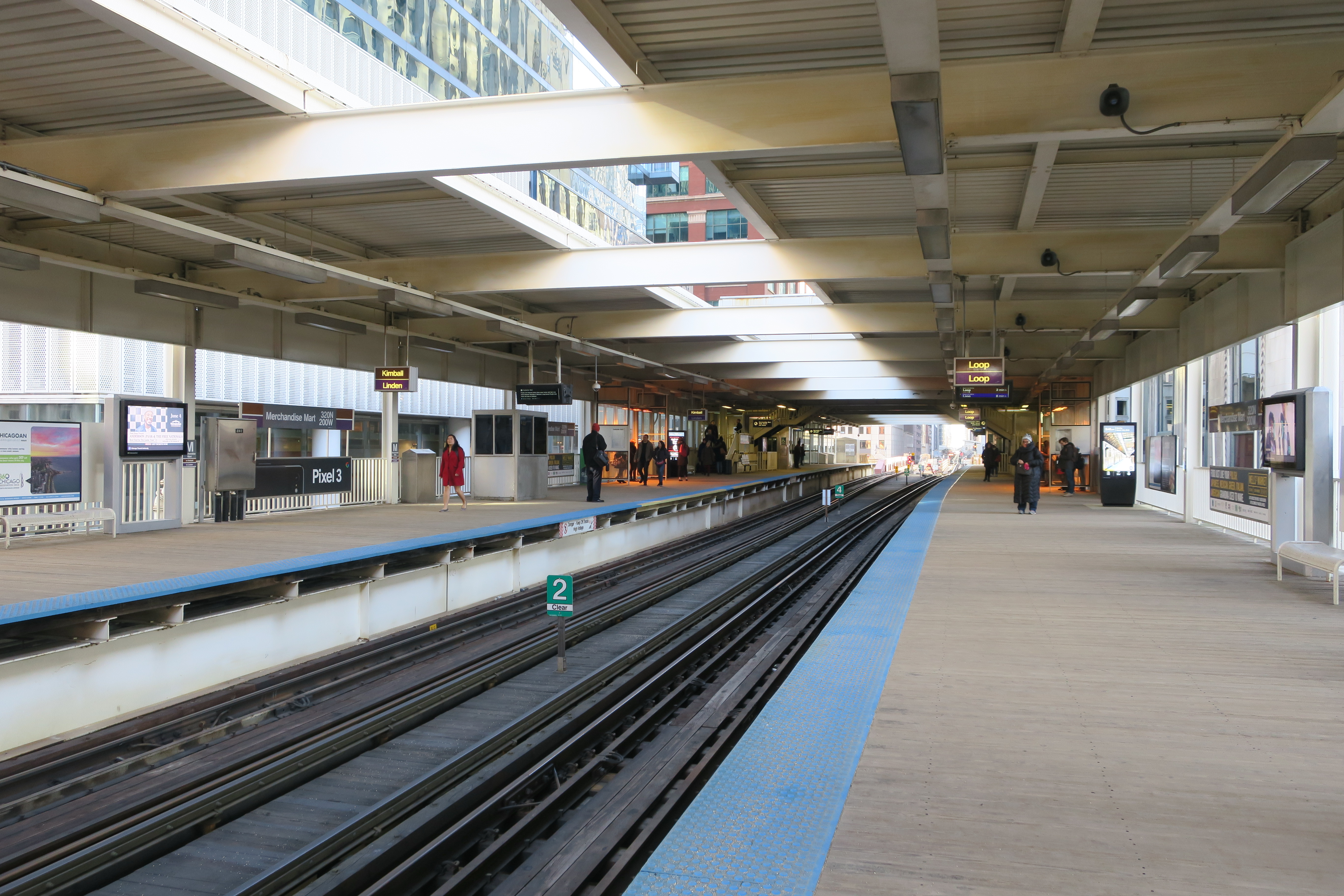

General information
- Location: 350 North Wells Street; Chicago, Illinois 60654
- Coordinates: 41.888675°N 87.633966°W
- Owner: Chicago Transit Authority
- Line: North Side main line
- Platforms: 2 side platforms
- Tracks: 2

Construction
- Structure type: Elevated
- Parking: No
- Accessible: Yes

History
- Opened: December 5, 1930; 95 years ago
- Rebuilt: 1987–1988; 38 years ago

Passengers
- 2025: 1,328,775 ▲12.3%

Services
Preceding station	Chicago "L"	Following station
Chicago toward Kimball	Brown Line	Washington/Wells Loop-bound terminus
Chicago toward Kimball	Brown Line	Clark/Lake One-way operation
Chicago toward Linden	Purple Line Express	Clark/Lake Loop-bound terminus
Chicago toward Linden	Purple Line Express	Washington/Wells One-way operation
Former services
Preceding station	Chicago North Shore and Milwaukee Railroad	Following station
Grand Avenue toward Milwaukee	North Shore Line	Clark/Lake One-way operation
Grand Avenue toward Milwaukee	North Shore Line	Randolph/Wells toward Roosevelt Road
Preceding station	Chicago "L"	Following station
Grand Closed 1970 toward Howard	North Side main line	North Water Terminal Terminus
Grand Closed 1970 toward Howard	North Side main line	Clark/Lake One-way operation
Grand Closed 1970 toward Howard	North Side main line	Randolph/Wells Closed 1995 toward Loop (Randolph/Wells)
Track layout
Location

Merchandise Mart is a station on the Chicago Transit Authority's 'L' system, located in the Near North Side neighborhood at 350 North Wells Street in Chicago, Illinois (directional coordinates 320 north, 200 west). The station is elevated above street level, on a steel structure. The turnstiles and customer assistant booth of the station are located on the second level of the Merchandise Mart itself. This is the main entrance to the station.

There are two fare-card only, unattended entrances atop two long stairways accessed directly from Wells Street, just north of Kinzie Avenue. The station is constructed mostly of steel, with wooden platforms covered by a canopy most of their length. There are two side platforms both long enough to support eight-car trains, the longest possible on the CTA system. The southbound platform is just slightly below the level of the station entrance while an enclosed bridge over the tracks connects to the northbound platform on the opposite side.

The station is fully accessible, resulting in a complicated elevator setup. The elevator on the southbound platform can lower from the entrance to the platform, as well as go up to the top of the bridge. Another elevator on the opposite side of the bridge lowers to the northbound platform.

== History ==
=== Kinzie station ===
Kinzie was a station on the Northwestern Elevated Railroad's North Side Main Line. The station was located at Kinzie Street and Wells Street in the Near North Side neighborhood of Chicago. Its location once served the nearby C&NW passenger terminal, Wells Street Station, prior to the 1911 opening of a new C&NW terminal at today's Ogilvie Transportation Center.

Kinzie opened on May 31, 1900, and closed in 1921; it was replaced by the Grand station. Today, Kinzie Street is serviced by Brown Line and Purple Line Express trains at Merchandise Mart station.

=== Merchandise Mart station ===
The current station opened on December 5, 1930, and was rebuilt from 1987 to 1988. Until 1963 the station also served interurban trains of the North Shore Line. The primary purpose of the station is to serve the Merchandise Mart, one of the world's largest commercial buildings, although there are some galleries and restaurants nearby.

== Service ==
Merchandise Mart serves the Brown Line, but Purple Line Express trains also stop at the station during weekday rush hours. Merchandise Mart was the only Brown Line station that did not receive upgrades or renovation during the Brown Line Capacity Expansion Project; due to its recent reconstruction from 1987 to 1988, the station was already accessible to passengers with disabilities and of sufficient length to accommodate eight-car trains, and no major renovation was needed during the project.

== Bus connections ==
CTA

- 37 Sedgwick (weekdays only)
- 125 Water Tower Express (weekday rush hours only)
