= Clark Station =

Clark Station may refer to:

- Clark Station, Louisville, a neighborhood in Louisville, Kentucky
- Clark/Lake station, a rapid transit station in Chicago
- Clark/Division station, a rapid transit station in Chicago
- Clark station (CTA), a closed rapid transit station in Chicago
