= Clark station (CTA) =

Former Chicago Howard Line train station

CLARK 3400N 1100W
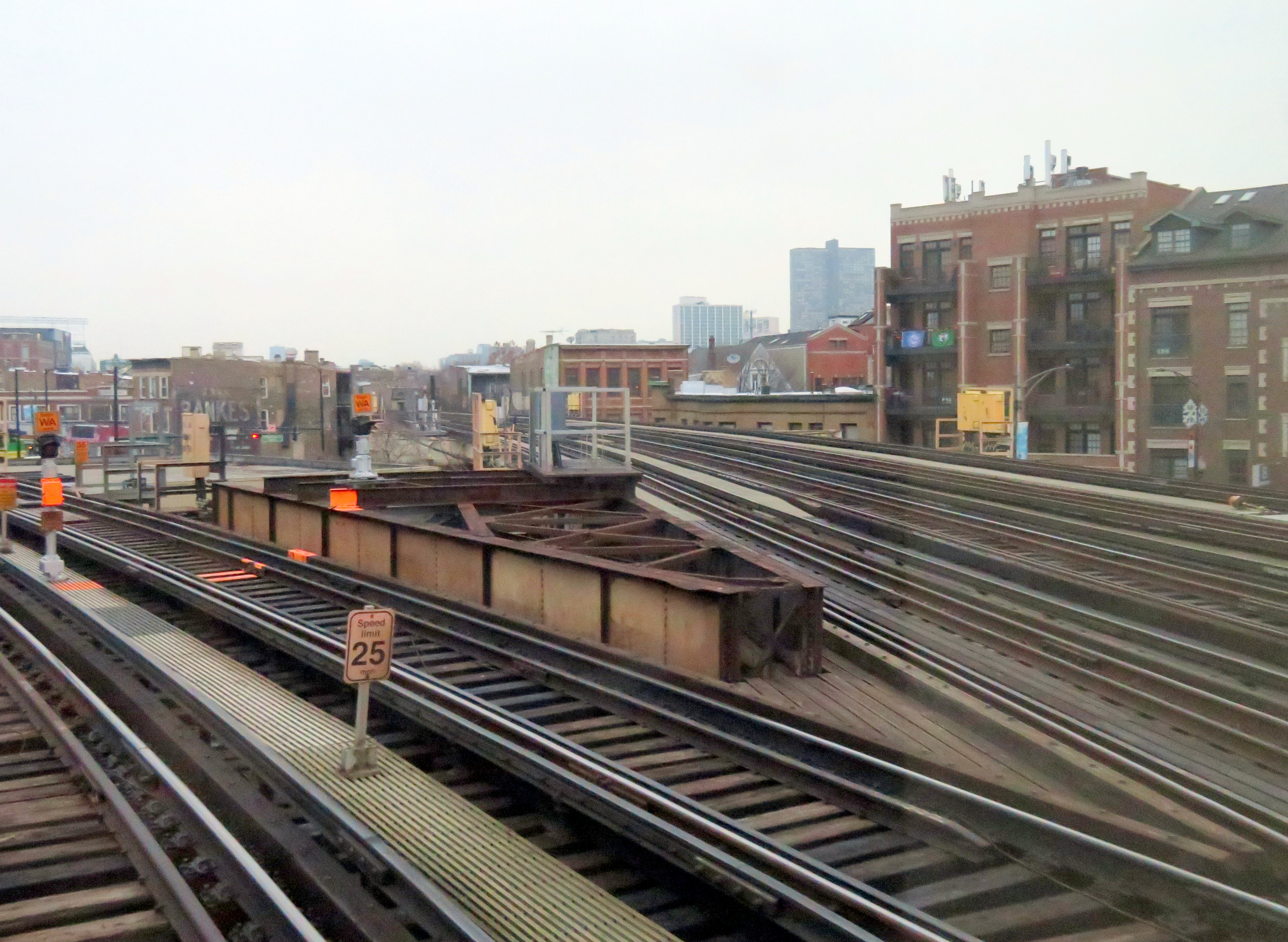
- Remains of Clark station in December 2018; in 2021, a flyover was built to replace the junction

General information
- Location: Clark Street and Roscoe Street; Chicago, Illinois
- Coordinates: 41.9436°N 87.6534°W
- Owner: Chicago Transit Authority
- Line: North Side Main Line
- Platforms: 2 side platforms
- Tracks: 4 tracks

Construction
- Structure type: Elevated

History
- Opened: June 6, 1900; 126 years ago
- Closed: August 1, 1949; 77 years ago

Former services
Preceding station	Chicago "L"	Following station
Addison toward Howard	North Side main line	Belmont toward Loop (Randolph/Wells) or North Water Terminal
Location

Clark was a station on the Chicago Transit Authority's Howard Line, which is now part of the Red Line. The station was located at the corner of Clark and Roscoe Streets in the Lakeview neighborhood of Chicago, at what is now the junction between the Red and Brown lines. Clark was situated north of Belmont and south of Addison.

== History ==
The station opened on June 6, 1900, and closed on August 1, 1949, along with 22 other stations as part of a CTA service revision. The main station structure was taken apart in the 1950s, and the mechanical tower was demolished and replaced by a new one in 1976.

In 2006, due to a major track and signalling renewal project, the CTA had to refurbish the mechanical tower to improve service reliability.

In 2021, the CTA built a flyover to replace the junction where the trains crossed at grade. The land surrounding the Clark and Roscoe junction had to be cleared.
