= Sheridan station (CTA) =

Chicago "L" station

Sheridan 4000N 1000W
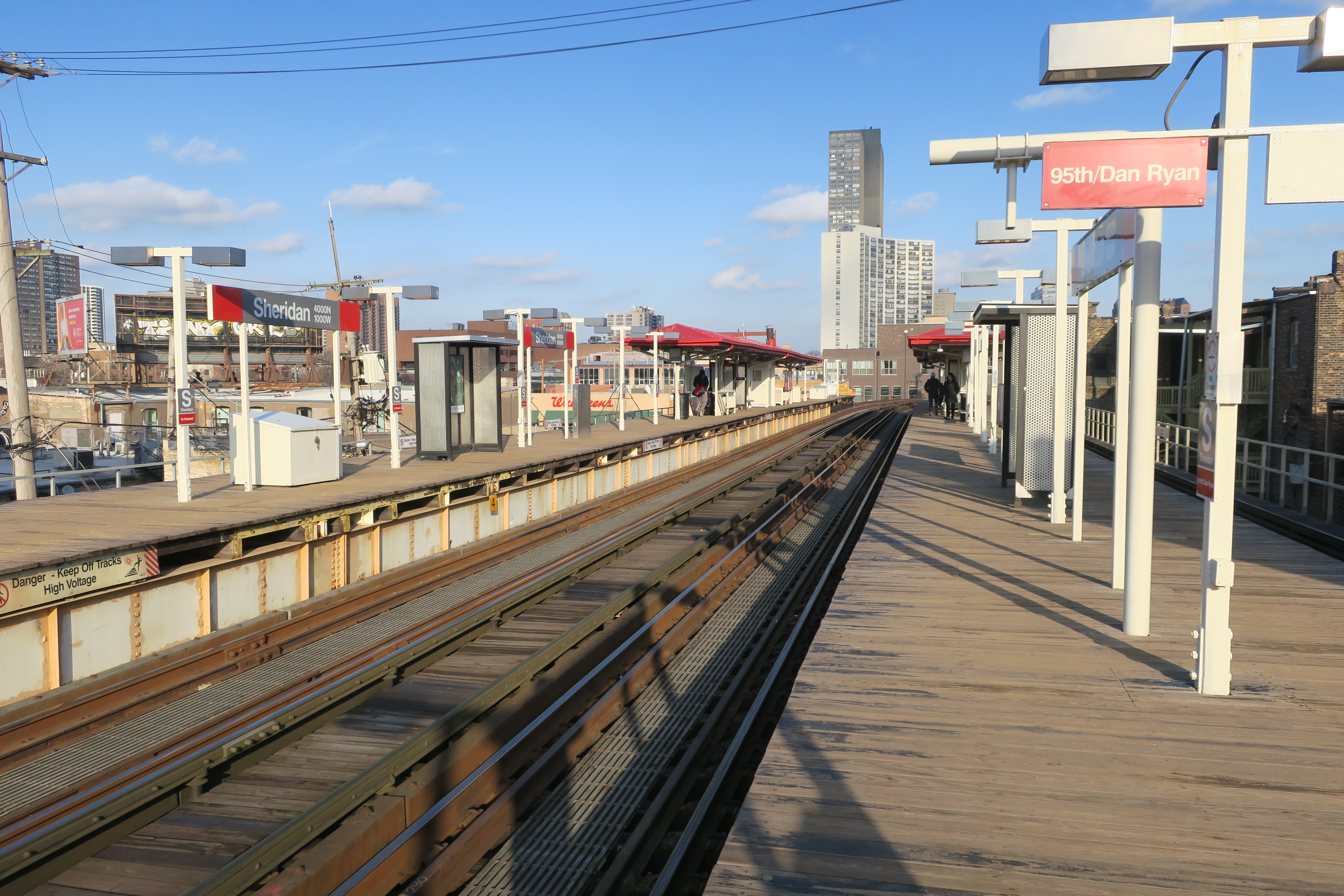

General information
- Location: 3940 North Sheridan Road; Chicago, Illinois 60613
- Coordinates: 41.953883°N 87.655269°W
- Owner: Chicago Transit Authority
- Line: North Side Main Line
- Platforms: 2 island platforms
- Tracks: 4

Construction
- Structure type: Elevated
- Accessible: No

History
- Opened: May 31, 1900; 126 years ago
- Rebuilt: 1916, 1930

Passengers
- 2025: 888,685 ▲4.5%

Services
Preceding station	Chicago "L"	Following station
Wilson toward Howard	Red Line	Addison toward 95th/Dan Ryan
Purple Line does not stop here
Former services
Preceding station	Chicago "L"	Following station
Buena Closed 1949 toward Howard	North Side main line	Grace Closed 1949 toward Loop (Randolph/Wells) or North Water Terminal
Track layout
Location

Sheridan is an 'L' station on the CTA's Red Line. It is an elevated station with two island platforms, located at 3940 North Sheridan Road, in the Lakeview neighborhood of Chicago's Lakeview community area. Sheridan is the closest 'L' stop to Graceland Cemetery, which is about one-half mile to the west on Irving Park Road. The Sheridan station is one of only two remaining 'L' stations that were built on S-curves; Indiana on the Green Line is the other. Purple Line weekday rush hour express service use the outside tracks but do not stop at the station. The entrance features Beaux-Arts and Doric architectural features.

== History ==
=== Purple Line connections ===
Beginning spring 2007, northbound and southbound Purple Line Express trains stop at Sheridan before Chicago Cubs weekday night games in order to provide more service to Wrigley Field, less than a mile from the station. Previously, trains had stopped at the Addison station to the south but that station does not have platform access to the express tracks as Sheridan does, which required Purple Line trains to cross over to the Red Line tracks. In order to prevent this from adding to delays caused by the Brown Line reconstruction, the stop was moved to Sheridan.

Sheridan also sees frequent use by Red Line passengers traveling to and from Wrigley Field, since Addison is often crowded after Cubs games.

=== Red & Purple Modernization Project ===
As part of the Red & Purple Modernization Project, the Sheridan station was proposed to be replaced with a new Irving Park station if the CTA decides not to go with the "no action" alternative.

From March 6, 2015 until October 23, 2017, all Loop-bound Purple Line express trains shared tracks with 95th-bound Red Line trains (and stopped during AM rush hours), due to the Wilson station reconstruction.

== Station layout ==
The station has two island platforms—potentially giving access to all four tracks that run through the station. Red Line trains stop on the inner tracks at all times, and Purple Line Express trains pass through the station via the outer tracks.

== Bus connections ==
CTA

- X9 Ashland Express
- 80 Irving Park
- 151 Sheridan
