= Wells Street (Chicago) =

Street in Chicago, Illinois, U.S.

Coordinates: 41°52′53.4″N 87°38′1.7″W

- William Wells Street; 200 West
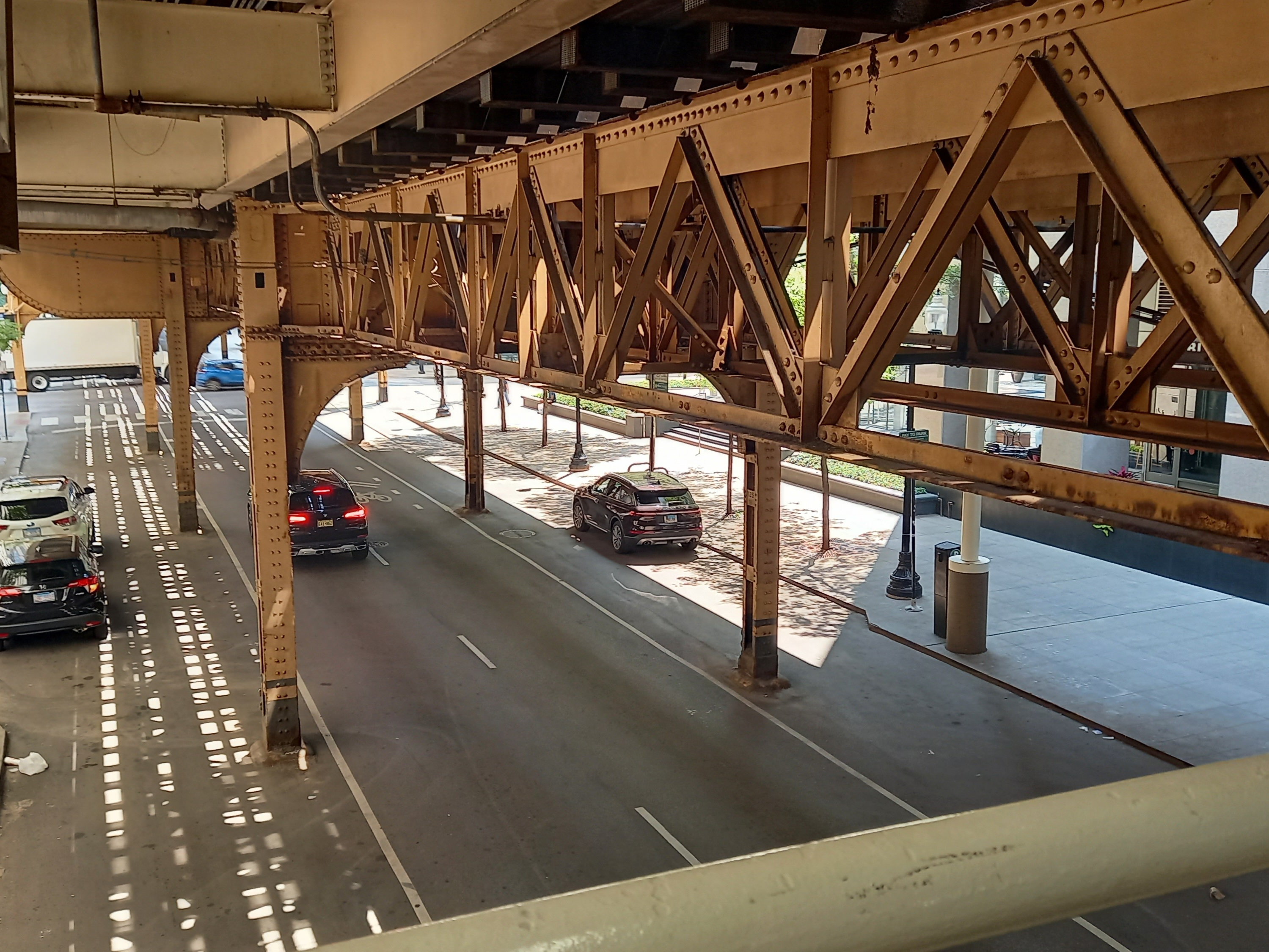
- Wells Street below the Loop Elevated tracks, taken from Washington/Wells station
- Interactive map of Wells Street
- Former name: 5th Avenue
- South end: 65th Street/Wentworth Avenue in Chicago
- North end: Lincoln Avenue in Chicago

Other
- Known for: William Wells

Wells Street is a major north–south street in Chicago. It is officially designated as 200 West, and is named in honor of William Wells, a United States Army Captain who died in the Battle of Fort Dearborn. Between 1870 and 1912, it was named 5th Avenue so as not to tarnish the name of Wells during a period when the street had a bad reputation.

Some downtown blocks of Wells Street are located beneath the Chicago 'L' train system. The first Crate & Barrel store, which opened in 1962, was located on Wells Street.

Wells Street was named in Time Magazine's 1976 article "The Porno Plague".

== Route description ==
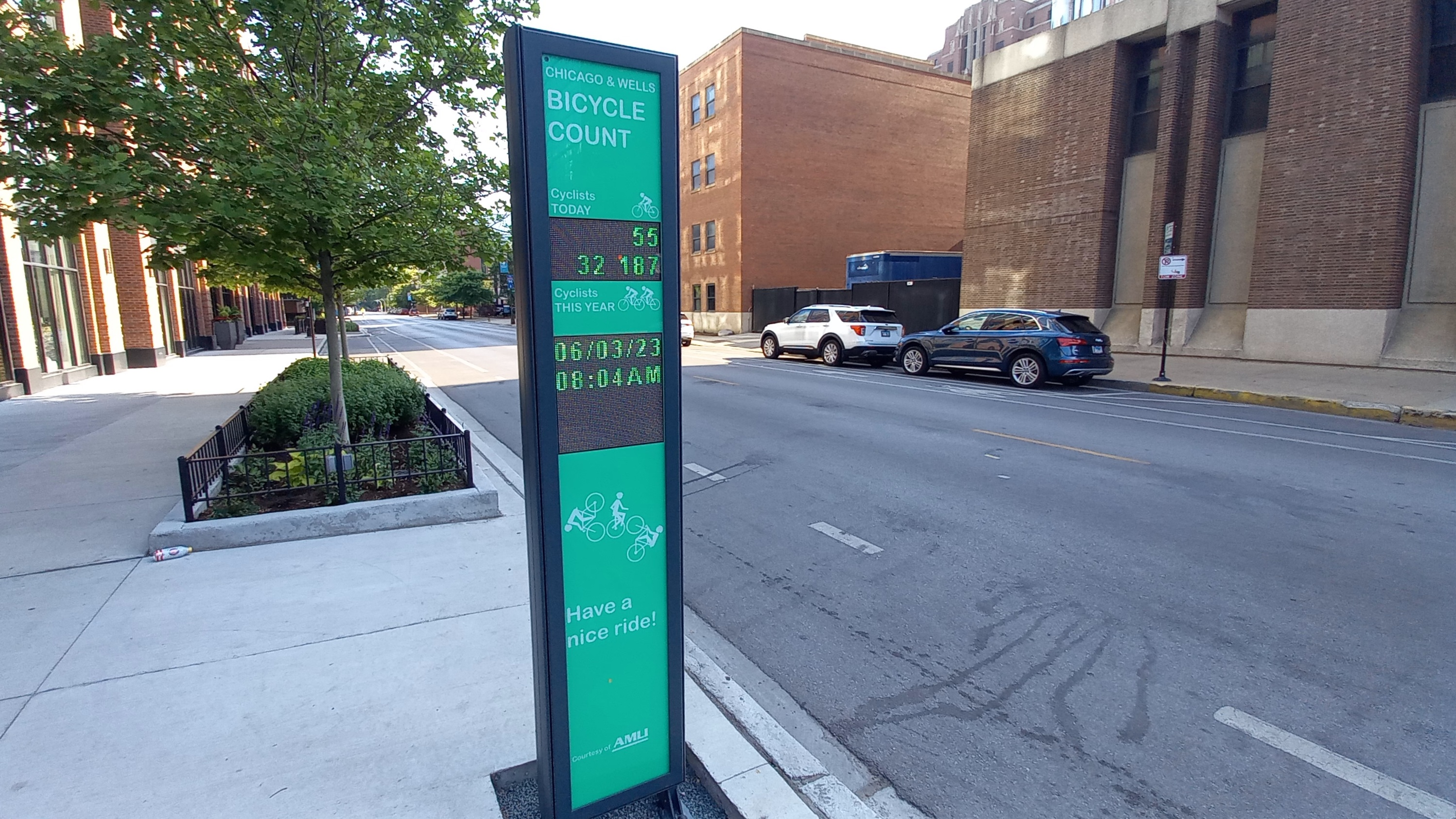
A bike counter near the intersection of Wells Street and Chicago Avenue

Wells Street starts off as a frontage road of I-90/I-94 (Dan Ryan Expressway) carrying southbound traffic from 63rd Street to 65th Street near the Rock Island District line and from 47th Street to 59th Street. Wells Street then becomes a disjointed residential street throughout the South Side, with one of the gaps being occupied by Wentworth Gardens and Rate Field and another being occupied by I-55.

Wells Street returns as a throughfare below Roosevelt Road. The street is in proximity with British International School of Chicago, South Loop and LaSalle Street Station as well as River City and the former site of Grand Central Station on the other side. Between Ida B. Wells Drive and Erie Street, Wells Street only serves southbound traffic. Between Van Buren Street and Lake Street, the street finds itself under the Loop Elevated tracks; the elevated tracks continue north as the North Side main line all the way toward Hubbard Street, where it shifts one block west. Wells Street crosses the Chicago River at the Wells Street Bridge.

North of the Chicago River, Wells Street is adjacent to Merchandise Mart. A bike counter is present at Chicago Avenue, which was installed in December 2022. Wells Street is in the vicinity of the Moody Bible Institute and Walter Payton College Preparatory High School at Chicago Avenue and Oak Street respectively. In the Old Town neighborhood, Wells Street serves a series of retail shops, bars, and restaurants. As Wells Street approaches Lincoln Park, the street ends at Lincoln Avenue just west of Clark Street.

== Intersections ==
The following road junction list only shows Wells Street on the North Side and the downtown area.

The entire route is in Chicago, Cook County.

mi	km	Destinations	Notes
0.0	0.0	Lincoln Avenue	Northern terminus
0.3	0.48	IL 64 (North Avenue)	North border of the Near North neighborhood
0.8	1.3	Division Street	
1.3	2.1	Chicago Avenue	
1.5	2.4	Ontario Street	To Kennedy Expressway
1.6	2.6	Ohio Street	
1.65	2.66	Grand Avenue	Westbound road only; one-way road
1.7	2.7	Illinois Street	
1.7	2.7	Kinzie Street	Merchandise Mart
1.9	3.1	Wells Street Bridge	
2.0	3.2	Upper Wacker Drive	
2.1	3.4	Randolph Street	Westbound only; one-way road
2.2	3.5	Washington Street	Eastbound only; one-way road
2.3	3.7	Madison Street	Westbound only; one-way road
2.5	4.0	Adams Street	Westbound only; one-way road
2.6	4.2	Jackson Boulevard	Eastbound only; one-way road
2.8	4.5	Ida B. Wells Drive to I-290 west / IL 110 (CKC) west	To Jane Byrne Interchange
2.8	4.5	Harrison Street	
3.2	5.1	Cul-de-sac near Roosevelt Road	Current southern terminus
		Wentworth Avenue	Future southern terminus (under construction through The 78)
1.000 mi = 1.609 km; 1.000 km = 0.621 mi: Unopened

== Transportation ==
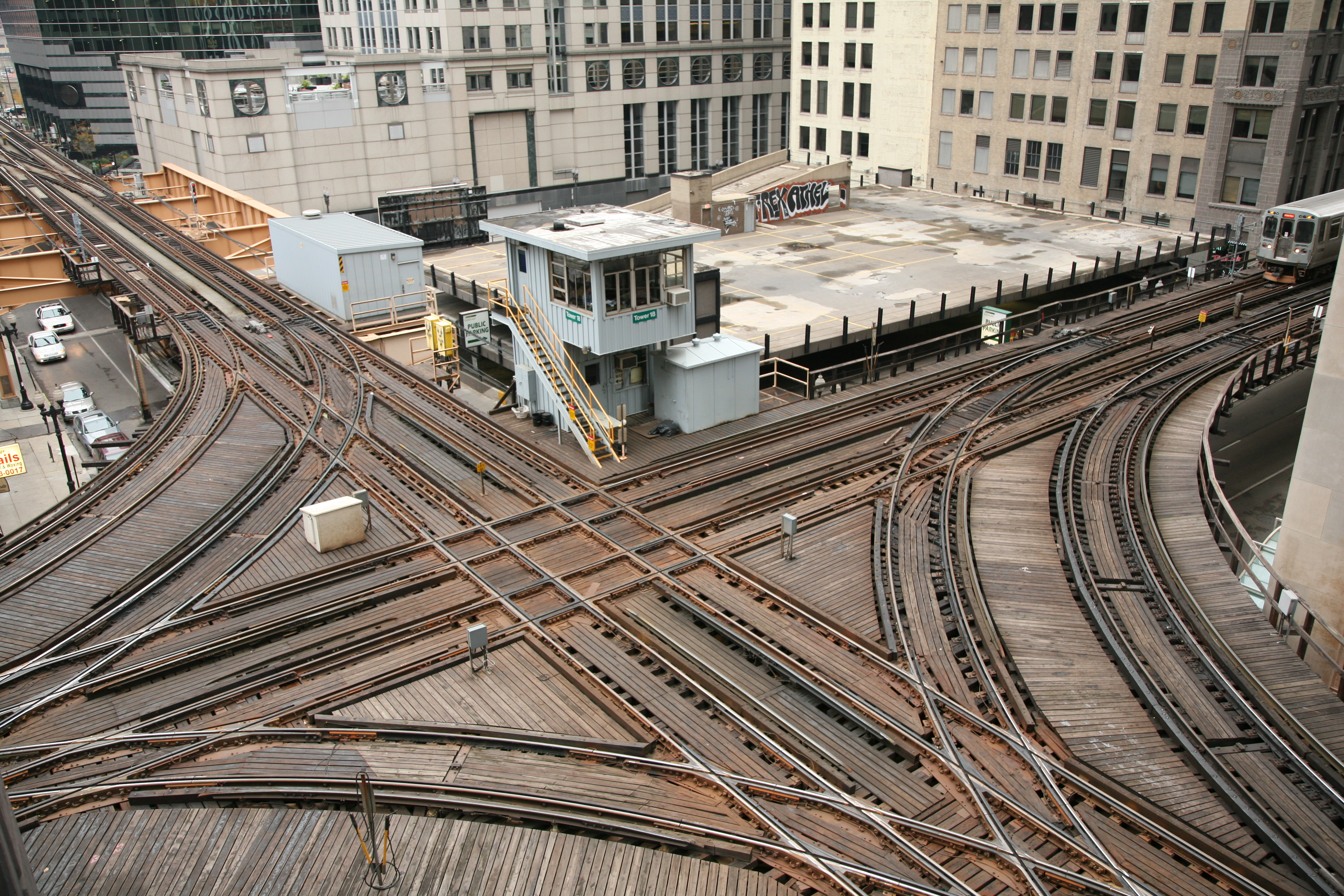
Chicago Transit Authority signal tower 18 guides elevated Chicago 'L' north and southbound Purple and Brown lines intersecting with east and westbound Pink and Green lines and the looping Orange line above the Wells and Lake street intersection in the loop.

The western portion of the Loop Elevated runs on top of Wells Street from Van Buren Street to Lake Street. Tracks continue to run above Wells Street as the North Side main line before shifting west at Hubbard Street. Wells Street is in proximity with LaSalle Street Station at Ida B. Wells Drive.

Wells Street serves southbound CTA bus route 36 from Van Buren Street to Harrison Street. Bus route 36 usually ends at LaSalle Street Station; in some cases, the bus route travels further west toward a Greyhound bus terminal. Southbound bus route 37 runs along Wells Street from Chicago Avenue to Van Buren Street, where it continues west toward Clinton station. Southbound bus route 125 runs along Wells Street from Ontario Street to Upper Wacker Drive, where it then heads west toward Ogilvie station, Union Station, and a Greyhound bus terminal. CTA bus route 65 briefly runs along Wells Street as Grand Avenue becomes a one-way road for westbound traffic.

In the South Side, Wells Street serves bus route 24 as a southbound frontage road of I-90/I-94 (Dan Ryan Expressway). Bus routes 15 and 51 use Wells Street after leaving 47th station; bus route 59 uses Wells Street after leaving Garfield station.
