= North Side main line =

Segment of the Chicago "L"

North Side Main Line
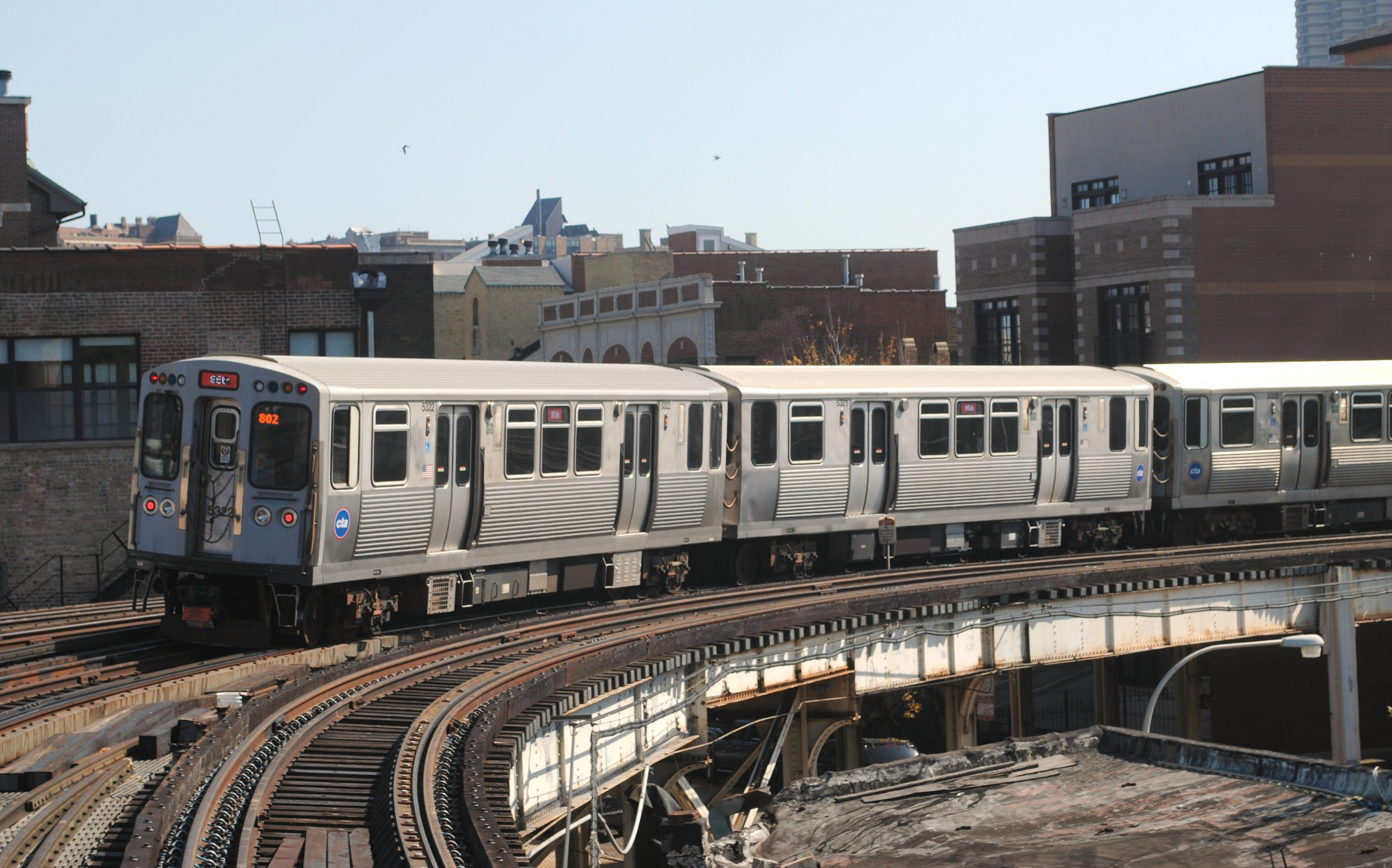
- Red Line train departing from Sheridan station

Overview
- Status: Operational
- Locale: Chicago, Illinois, United States
- Termini: Howard; Merchandise Mart
- Stations: 21

Service
- Type: Rapid transit
- System: Chicago "L"
- Services: Red Purple Brown
- Operator(s): Chicago Transit Authority (1947–present); Chicago Rapid Transit Company (1924–1947); Northwestern Elevated Railroad (1900–1924)
- Rolling stock: 2600-series, 3200-series, 5000-series
- Daily ridership: 147,042 (average weekday 2019)

History
- Opened: May 31, 1900; 126 years ago

Technical
- Line length: 10.3 mi (16.6 km)
- Number of tracks: 4 (Howard-Armitage); 2 (Armitage-Loop)
- Character: Elevated
- Track gauge: 4 ft 8 1/2 in (1,435 mm) standard gauge
- Electrification: Third rail, 600 V DC

The North Side Main Line is a branch of the Chicago "L" system that is used by Red, Purple, and Brown Line trains. As of 2012, it is the network's busiest rail branch, serving an average of 123,229 passengers each weekday. The branch is 10.3 miles (16.6 km) long with a total of 21 stations, from Howard Street in Rogers Park down to Lake Street in Chicago's Loop. The branch serves the north side of the city 24 hours a day, seven days a week.

Since 2005, this branch has been renovated several times and is currently being reconstructed. On January 7, 2011, CTA requested a rehabilitation program for the North Side Main Line. This project is part of the Red Ahead program.

== Route ==
The North Side Main Line connects to five other branches of the Chicago 'L', including the Ravenswood branch which is served by the Brown Line, the State Street subway which is served by the Red Line, the Skokie Branch which is served by the Yellow Line, the Evanston Branch which is served by the Purple Line, and The Loop which is served by Brown and Purple Line trains. North of Howard, the Purple Line continues to Evanston and Wilmette, and the Yellow Line runs through southern Evanston en route to its terminus in Skokie.

The North Side Main Line serves the Near North Side, Old Town, Lincoln Park, Lakeview, Wrigleyville, Uptown, Edgewater and Rogers Park neighborhoods of Chicago, and has stops near Wrigley Field and Loyola University.

== Connection ==
Yellow and Purple Line trains merge onto the line at its northern terminus, the Howard Street Station. Red Line trains and the weekday rush hour Purple Line Express trains continue south on the part of the line that is known as the Howard Branch. The Ravenswood branch connects to the Main Line north of the Belmont station, where Brown Line trains merge onto the Main Line.

The part of the line south of this junction is known as the Loop Branch or the Ravenswood Connector. On the portion of this branch shared by Red and Brown Line trains, Red Line trains operate express on the inside tracks, while Brown and Purple Line Express trains run local on the outer two tracks. The Red Line passes through Wellington and Diversey stations (which is served mainly by Brown Line trains) and all trains make another stop at Fullerton.

After Fullerton, the Red Line descends into a portal after Armitage, and enters the State Street subway, while Brown and Purple Line express trains continue elevated for the remainder of the Main Line to Merchandise Mart, where they cross the Wells Street Bridge and enter the Loop at Tower 18.

== History ==
The line began operation on May 31, 1900, between The Loop and Wilson Avenue as the Northwestern Elevated Railroad. On May 16, 1908, service on the line was extended to Central street in Evanston. From 1919 to 1963, the line was also utilized by interurban trains of the Chicago North Shore and Milwaukee Railroad.

Since 2002, the main line has gone through plenty of renovations and rehabilitation projects and those projects are still going on as of today. Station renovations and track replacements have been happening ever since early 2012 and the CTA has been recently renovating all the Howard branch stations as part of the Red North Station Interim Improvements (see below).

=== Red North Station Interim Improvements ===
In November 2011, the CTA announced the Red North project as part of the Red Line Capital Investment. The cost of the project was $86 million with a $57.4 million contract granted to contractor Kiewit Infrastructure. The project included seven stations to be renovated which included Granville, Morse, Thorndale, Argyle, Berwyn, Lawrence, and Jarvis. The project started on June 1, 2012, at Granville and finished its renovation on December 13, 2012, at Jarvis. The project also caused the elimination of slow zones in which trains accelerate faster than usual.

=== Red & Purple Modernization Project ===
As part of the program, the CTA also dubbed the "Red & Purple Modernization Project." CTA recently studied four possible alternatives for the project and they are willing to provide community updates that can make improvements of those studies in late 2012 to 2013. CTA was proposing to close down five stations on the Red and Purple lines. The five potential stations include Foster, South Boulevard, Jarvis, Lawrence, and Thorndale.

In 2011, CTA planned a scoping process and which they provided public meetings and a comment period. The purpose of the scoping process was to ask operators and attentive parties to provide guidance on the proposed alternatives, the purpose and need for the project and the proposed topics of evaluation and potential effects and mitigation measures to be considered. During the scoping process CTA introduced six alternatives as part of the project.

This project completely rebuilt the Lawrence, Argyle, Berwyn, and Bryn Mawr stations and the construction of a new Red-Purple bypass. Construction on the project began on October 2, 2019, and was completed on July 20, 2025.

=== Wilson Station Reconstruction Project ===
From 2014 to 2018, The Chicago Department of Transportation rebuilt the Wilson station, which serves as a major transfer point between Red and Purple Line Express trains. The rebuilt station has a new main station entrance on the south side of Wilson, with two island platforms to provide access between the two lines, two auxiliary entrances: one at Sunnyside Avenue and one on the north side of Wilson.

Reconstruction began in October 2014 and ended in February 2018. The station remained open during reconstruction. The complete set of renderings and boards on display during the open house meeting are now available.

== Station listing ==
Station	Location	Notes
Howard	7519 N. Paulina Street	Transfer station for all 'L' routes serving this station
Jarvis	1523 W. Jarvis Avenue	
Morse	1358 W. Morse Avenue	
Loyola	1200 W. Loyola Avenue	
Granville	1119 W. Granville Avenue	Edgewater, Berger Park
Thorndale	1118 W. Thorndale Avenue	
Bryn Mawr	1119 W. Bryn Mawr Avenue	
Berwyn	1121 W. Berwyn Avenue	Originally known as Edgewater Beach
Argyle	1118 W. Argyle Street	
Lawrence	1117 W. Lawrence Avenue	
Wilson	4620 N. Broadway Street	
Buena	Buena Avenue and Kenmore Avenue	Closed August 1, 1949; demolished
Sheridan	3940 N. Sheridan Road	
Grace	Grace Street and Sheffield Avenue	Closed August 1, 1949; demolished
Addison	940 W. Addison Street	
Clark	Clark Street and Roscoe Street	Closed August 1, 1949; demolished
Belmont	945 W. Belmont Avenue	Transfer station for all 'L' routes serving this station
Wellington	945 W. Wellington Avenue	
Diversey	943 W. Diversey Avenue	
Wrightwood		Closed August 1, 1949; demolished
Fullerton	943 W. Fullerton Avenue	Transfer station for all 'L' routes serving this station
Webster		Closed August 1, 1949; demolished
Armitage	944 W. Armitage Avenue	
Willow	Willow Street and Sheffield Avenue	Closed May 17, 1942; demolished
Halsted		Closed August 1, 1949; demolished
Larrabee	Larrabee Street, Ogden Avenue and North Avenue	Closed August 1, 1949; demolished
Sedgwick	1536 N. Sedgwick Street	
Schiller		Closed August 1, 1949; demolished
Division		Closed August 1, 1949; demolished
Oak	Oak Street and Orleans Street	Closed August 1, 1949; demolished
Chicago	301 W. Chicago Avenue	
Grand	Grand Avenue and Franklin Street	Closed September 20, 1970; demolished
Kinzie	Kinzie Street and Wells Street	Closed 1921; demolished; replaced by Grand
Merchandise Mart	350 N. Wells Street	
North Water Terminal	North Water Street and Clark Street	Opened November 17, 1908, closed August 1, 1949; demolished

== Image gallery ==
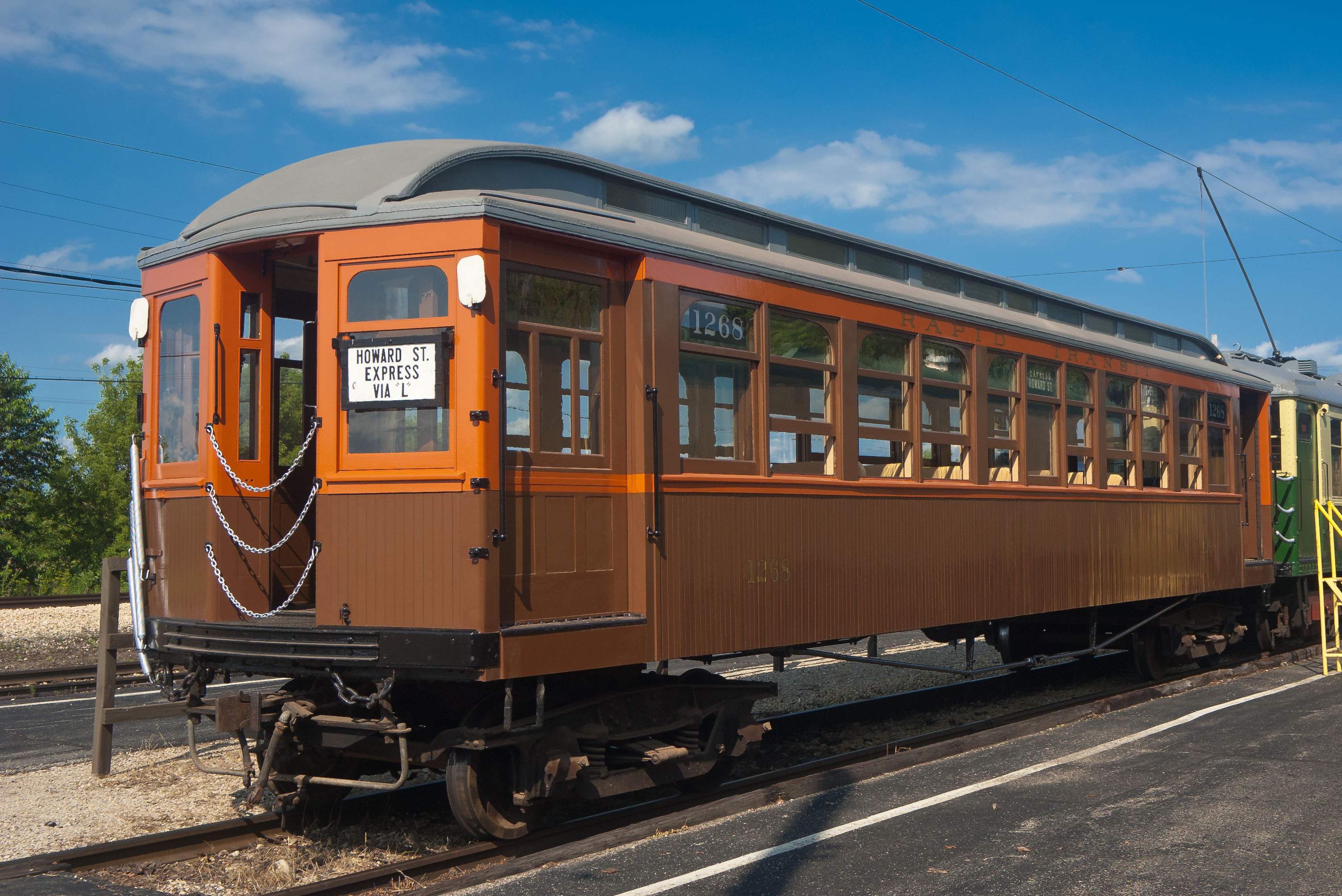
The North Side Main Line runs on the old Northwestern Elevated Railroad

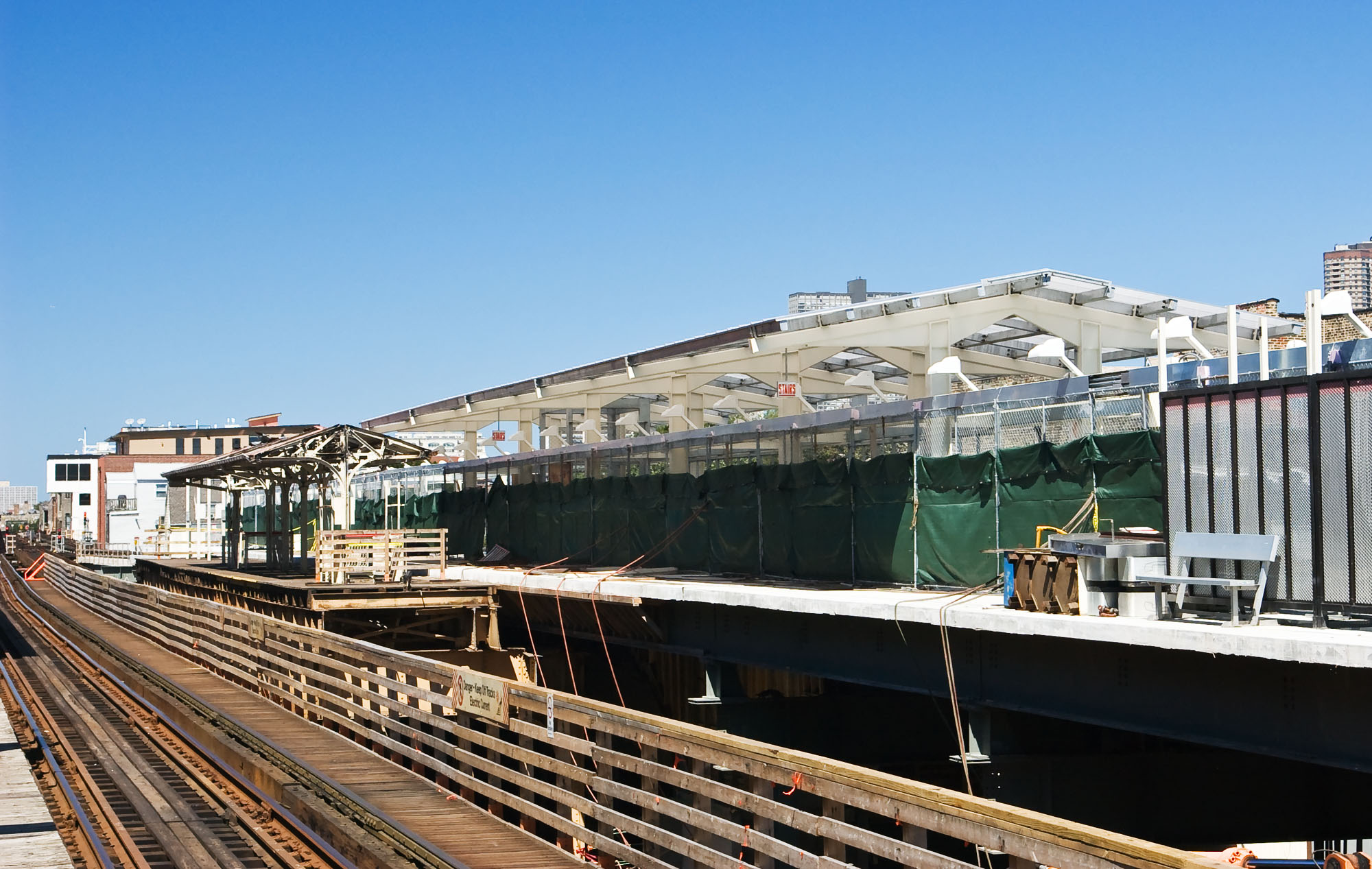
The Belmont station under construction in 2007

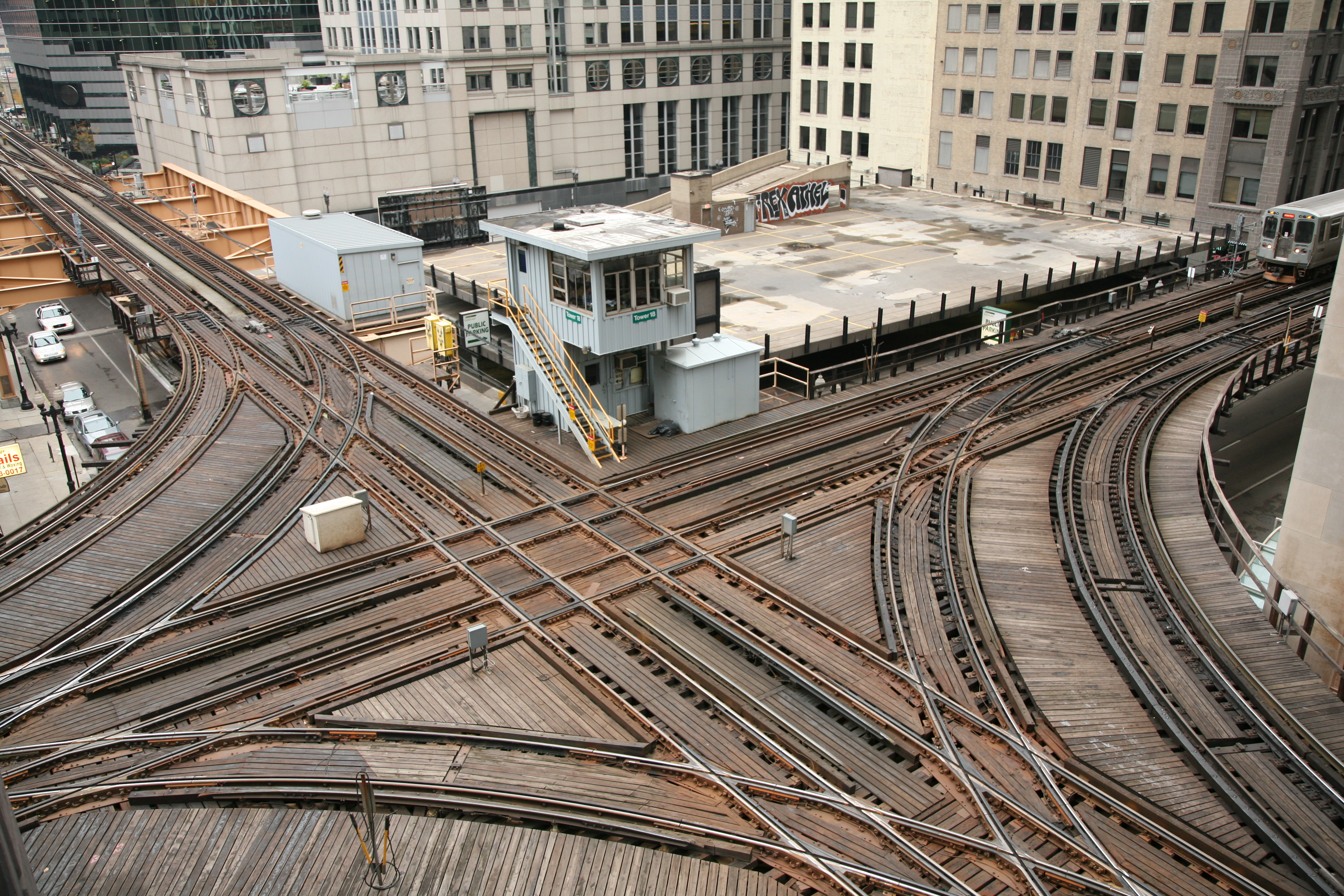
A temporarily rerouted Red Line train leaves the North Side Main Line and enters the Loop

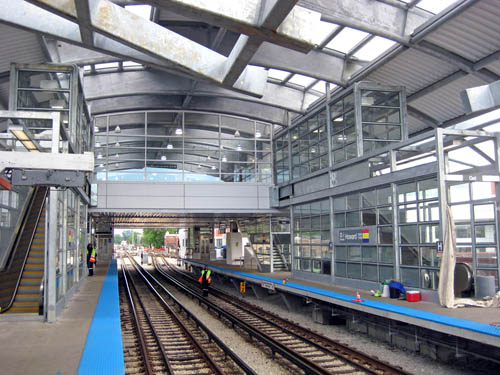
The Howard station complex serves as the end of the main line

== See also ==
- Northwestern Elevated Railroad
