= Chicago Avenue =

Avenue in Chicago, Illinois

- 800 North
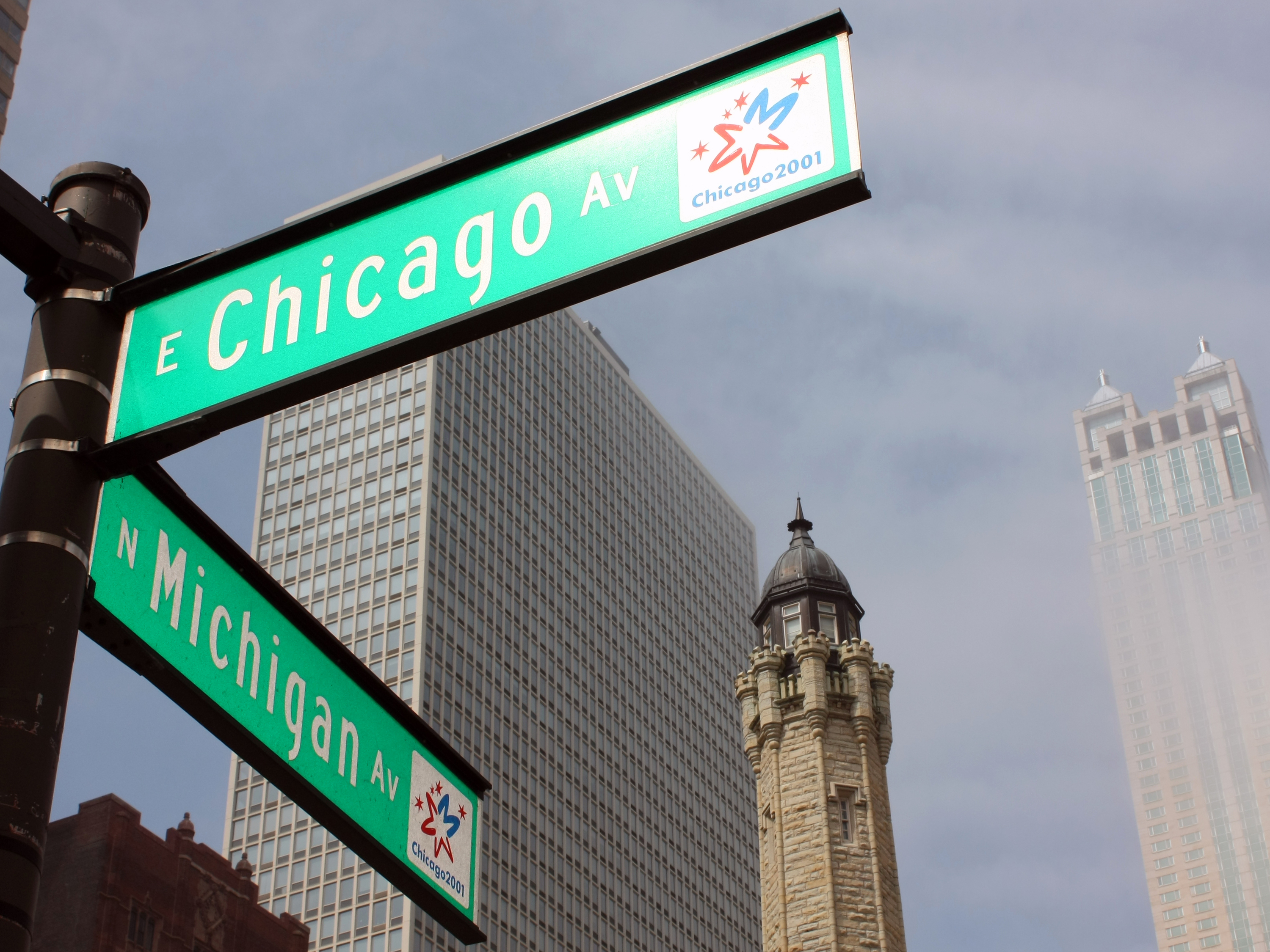
- Interactive map of Chicago Avenue
- Length: 12.2 mi (19.6 km)
- West end: 17th Avenue in Melrose Park
- East end: US 41 (Lake Shore Drive) in Chicago

Chicago Avenue is a major east–west street in Chicago, Illinois. In the Chicago street address system, it is at 800 north from 385 east to 5968 west, and continues west into the suburbs in several different suburban address systems. Chicago Avenue starts at the shore of Lake Michigan at Lake Shore Drive (U.S. Route 41) in the Gold Coast neighborhood of Chicago, and runs west approximately 12.2 miles (19.6 km) to 17th Avenue in Melrose Park, Illinois.

== Route description ==
1st Cavalry Illinois National Guard new armory building

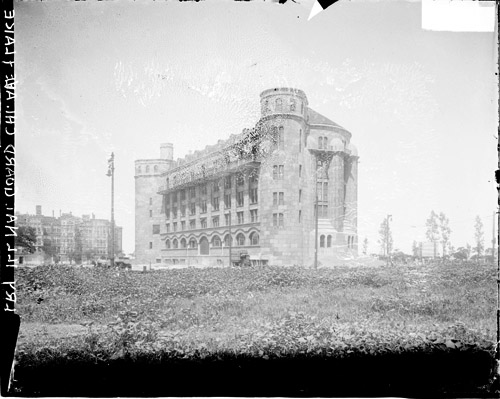
From right (1919)

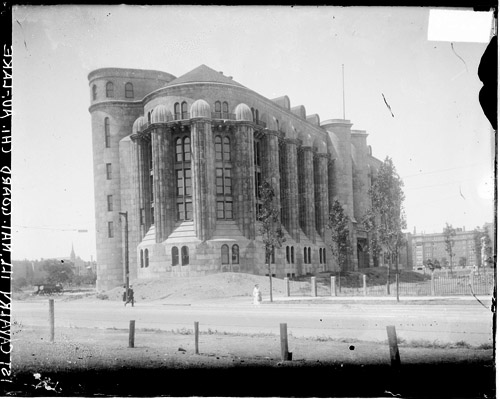
From left (1919)

The National Guard armory preceded the Museum of Contemporary Art, Chicago on Chicago Avenue near Lake Shore Drive.

Chicago Avenue has two lanes west of Austin Avenue, and the Chicago city limits, and roughly four lanes east of Austin Avenue.

Chicago Avenue runs just to the north of Westlake Hospital in Melrose Park. It then runs through Maywood and over the Des Plaines River before entering River Forest. Chicago Avenue is largely residential through River Forest and Oak Park, with a few small commercial strip malls and developments.

At Austin Avenue, Chicago Avenue becomes part of the addressing system for Chicago as 800 North, or 8 blocks (one mile) north of Madison Street. Chicago Avenue runs through the largely impoverished Austin and Humboldt Park neighborhoods. In the late 1940s and early 1950s at Chicago and Clark Streets, it was home to the first Puerto Rican immigrants to Chicago, who called the area "La Clark". East of about Kedzie Avenue, Chicago Avenue runs through the West Town and Near North Side areas.

== Public transportation ==
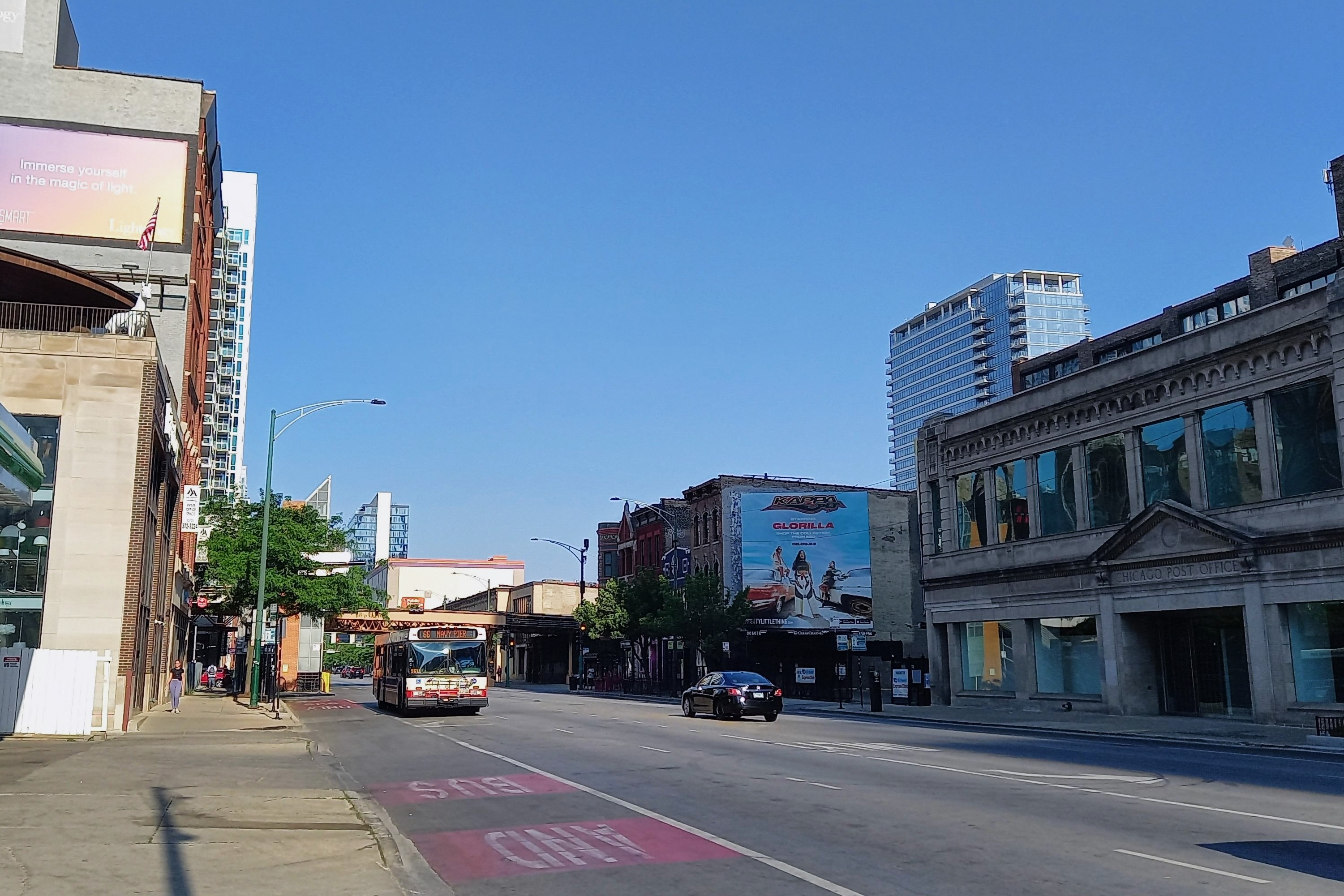
CTA route 66 bus with Chicago/Franklin "L" station in the background

Chicago Avenue is served by multiple Chicago Transit Authority (CTA) "L" lines: the Red Line (as Chicago), the Brown Line/Purple Line Express (as Chicago), and the Blue Line (as Chicago).

The 66 Chicago is a CTA bus route that primarily travels along Chicago Avenue. It runs between Navy Pier (via Fairbanks Court) and Austin Boulevard. On September 21, 2020, during the COVID-19 pandemic, the CTA began installing temporary "pop-up essential bus lanes" along a 4.6-mile-long (7.4 km) stretch on Chicago Avenue (Laramie Avenue to Ashland Avenue). The bus lanes were made permanent in December 2022. On April 2, 2021, the CTA began running battery electric buses along bus route 66, the first route to ever host them.
