= Washington/Wells station =

Chicago "L" station

Washington/Wells 100N 200W
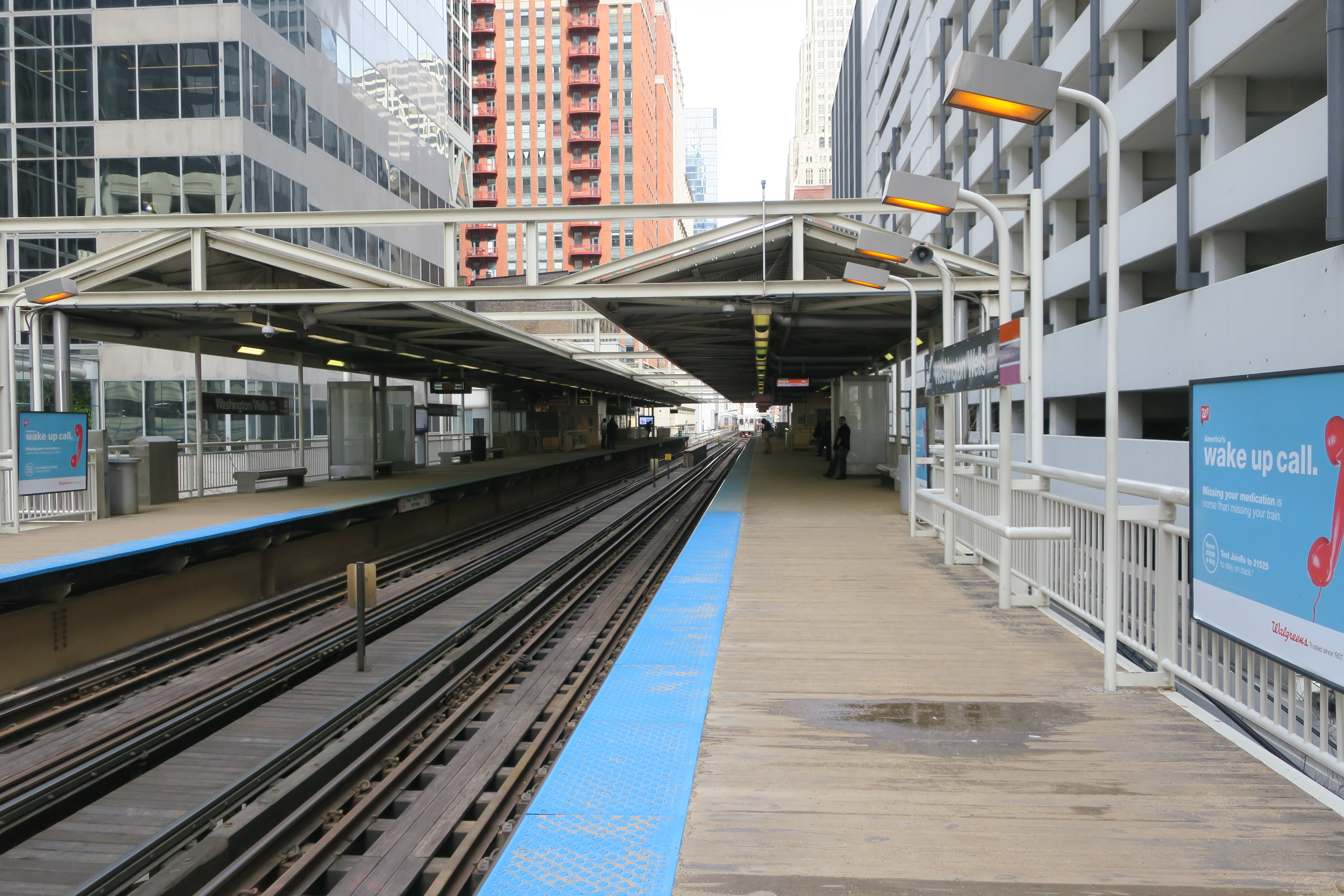

General information
- Location: 100 North Wells Street; Chicago, Illinois 60606
- Coordinates: 41.882541°N 87.633824°W
- Owner: Chicago Transit Authority
- Line: Loop Elevated
- Platforms: 2 side platforms
- Tracks: 2
- Connections: at Ogilvie

Construction
- Structure type: Elevated
- Cycle facilities: Yes
- Accessible: Yes

History
- Opened: July 17, 1995; 31 years ago

Passengers
- 2025: 1,453,146 ▲14.7%

Services
Preceding station	Chicago "L"	Following station
Clark/Lake toward Midway	Orange Line	Quincy One-way operation
Merchandise Mart toward Linden	Purple Line Express	Quincy One-way operation
Clinton toward 54th/Cermak	Pink Line	Quincy One-way operation
Merchandise Mart One-way operation	Brown Line	Quincy toward Kimball
Track layout
Location

Washington/Wells is a station on the Chicago "L" system, located in downtown Chicago, Illinois on The Loop. The station opened on July 17, 1995. Washington/Wells is located a few blocks from several major attractions and business centers, such as Chicago City Hall, the Civic Opera House, and the Chicago Mercantile Exchange. The station is also three blocks east of Ogilvie Transportation Center, terminal for the Union Pacific North, Northwest, and West line Metra trains. The station is located between Washington and Madison on Wells Street in downtown Chicago.

== History ==
The Washington/Wells station replaced two former Loop stations, Randolph/Wells and Madison/Wells. The CTA did the same on the Wabash side of the Loop, replacing Randolph/Wabash and Madison/Wabash with Washington/Wabash.

== Station layout ==
The station is located between Washington and Madison Streets and is constructed of steel and concrete, with wooden platforms. A large mezzanine is accessible by stairs just south of Washington on either side of Wells, and the station is also accessible via elevators. Just past several turnstiles are stairwells leading to the platform level; the easternmost stairs go to the Inner Loop platform while the westernmost go to the Outer Loop platform. Both platforms are also serviced by elevators. It is possible to go from one platform to the other without leaving the paid area, making Washington/Wells a transfer station. The platforms are from Washington to Madison; the platforms continues over Madison Street. There are auxiliary exits on both ends of both platforms to the east sides of Washington and Madison. Both platforms can handle eight-car trains, the longest on the CTA system.

== Service ==
Washington/Wells serves the Brown Line (which travels counterclockwise on the Outer Loop track), and the Orange Line, Purple Line Express (weekday rush hours only), and Pink Line (which travel clockwise on the Inner Loop track).

== Bus connections ==
CTA

- J14 Jeffery Jump
- 20 Madison (Owl Service)
- 37 Sedgwick (weekdays only)
- 56 Milwaukee
- 60 Blue Island/26th (Owl Service)
- 124 Navy Pier
- 157 Streeterville/Taylor (weekdays only)
