= Randolph/Wells station =

Randolph/Wells 145N 200W
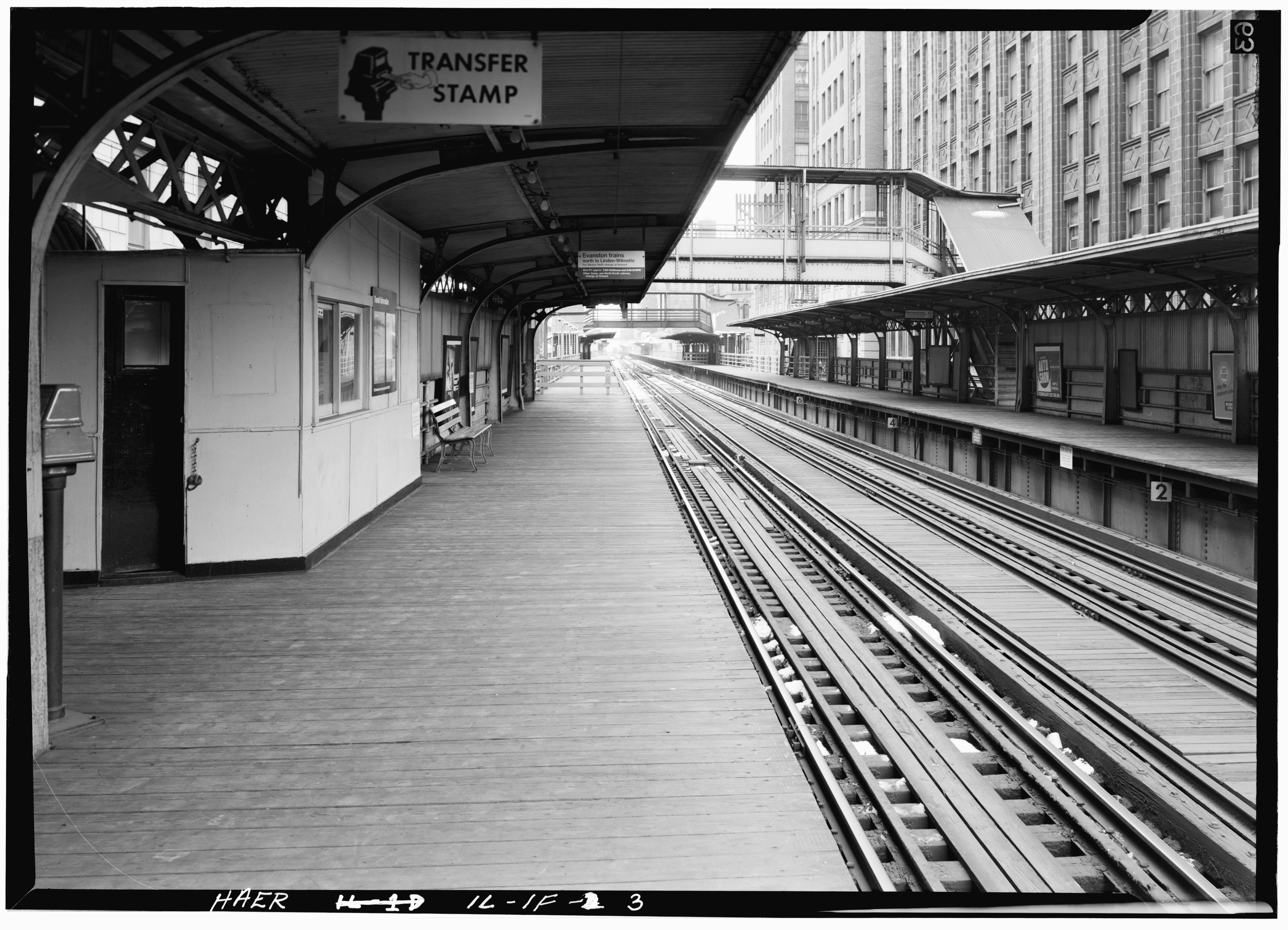

General information
- Location: 150 North Wells Street; Chicago, Illinois 60602
- Coordinates: 41.88446°N 87.63388°W
- Owner: Chicago Transit Authority
- Line: Loop Elevated
- Platforms: 2 side platforms
- Tracks: 2 tracks

Construction
- Structure type: Elevated

History
- Opened: October 3, 1897; 128 years ago
- Closed: July 17, 1995; 31 years ago
- Rebuilt: 1913; 113 years ago (new station houses added)
- Former names: Randolph & Fifth

Former services
Preceding station	Chicago North Shore and Milwaukee Railroad	Following station
Merchandise Mart One-way operation	North Shore Line	Madison/Wells toward Roosevelt Road
Preceding station	Chicago "L"	Following station
Clark/Lake toward Midway	Orange Line	Madison/Wells Closed 1994 One-way operation
Merchandise Mart toward Linden	Purple Line Express	Madison/Wells Closed 1994 One-way operation
Merchandise Mart One-way operation	Brown Line	Madison/Wells Closed 1994 toward Kimball
Location

Randolph/Wells was a station on the Chicago Transit Authority's Loop. The station was located at 150 North Wells Street in downtown Chicago. Randolph/Wells opened on October 3, 1897, and closed just after midnight on July 17, 1995; this station and Madison/Wells were replaced by Washington/Wells.

A small remaining portion of the original station platform contains a shed housing automatic switching equipment for Tower 18.
