= North Water Terminal =

Elevated station in Chicago, Illinois

NORTH WATER TERMINAL 350N 100W
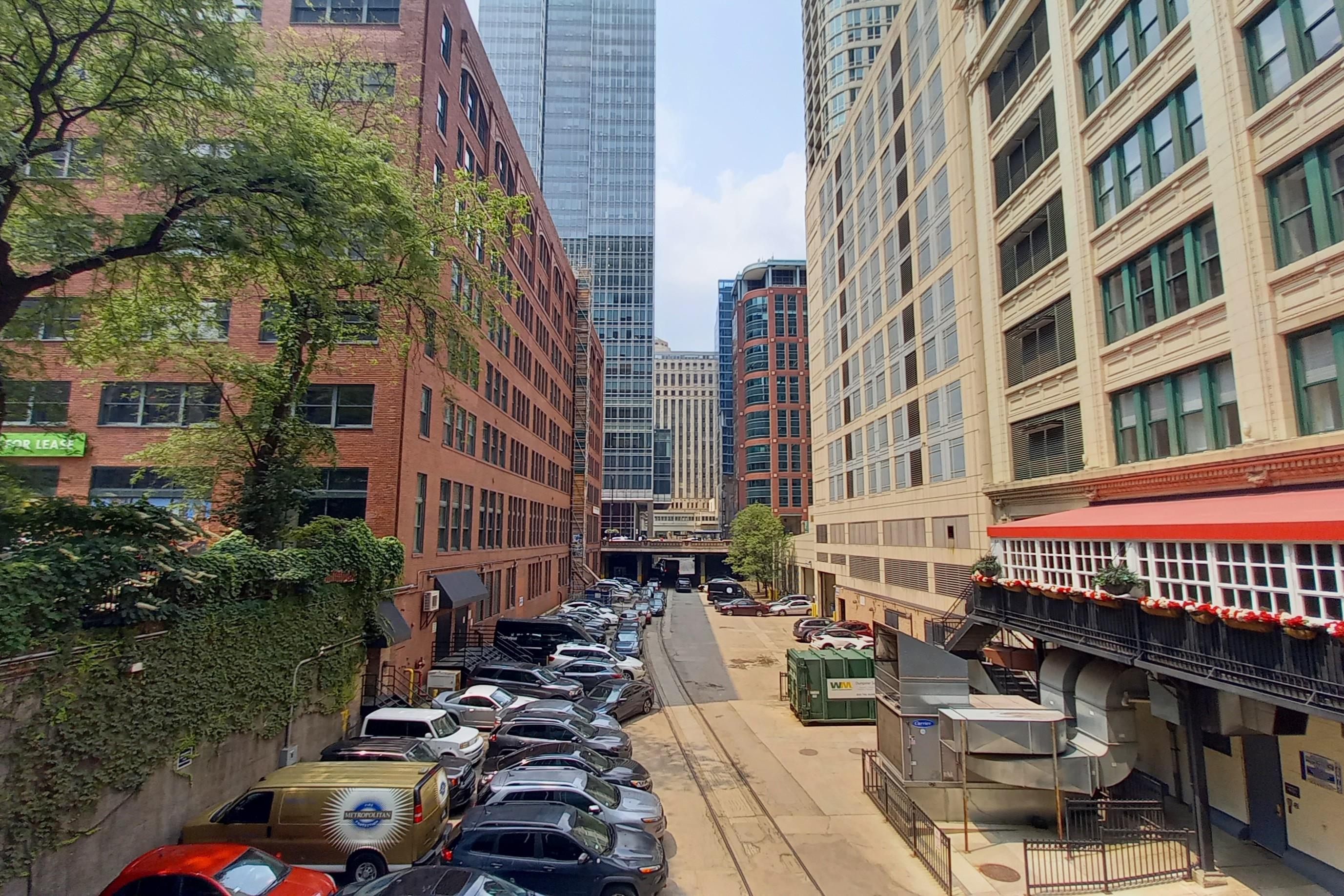
- Current site of the demolished elevated terminal

General information
- Location: Carroll Avenue and Clark Street; Chicago, Illinois
- Coordinates: 41°53′19″N 87°37′54″W
- Owner: Chicago Transit Authority
- Line: North Side main line
- Platforms: 1 island platform, 2 side platforms
- Tracks: 2

Construction
- Structure type: Elevated

History
- Opened: November 17, 1908
- Closed: August 1, 1949
- Original company: Northwestern Elevated Railroad Company

Former services
Preceding station	Chicago "L"	Following station
Merchandise Mart toward Howard	North Side main line North Water branch	Terminus
Location

The North Water Terminal was an "L" station on the North Side main line, located in the Near North Side neighborhood in Chicago, Illinois. While the initial portion of the Northwestern Elevated (Loop–Wilson) opened in 1900, the terminal opened on November 17, 1908, to accommodate excess traffic in the downtown area. A walkway was provided to connect the terminal station to the nearby Merchandise Mart station.

There was once a proposal in 1916 to extend the stub from the terminal to State/Lake station via Carroll Avenue and State Street; however, this extension never materialized. The station ceased passenger services by August 1, 1949, as part of a systemwide service revision along both the North Side main line and the South Side Elevated. However, while passenger service ceased, trains still served the terminal in special occasions like maintenance and emergencies. The station was eventually demolished in 1963.

== See also ==
- Stub terminals of the Chicago "L"
