= Lake–Dan Ryan route =

Rail rapid transit route in Illinois, US

Lake–Dan Ryan
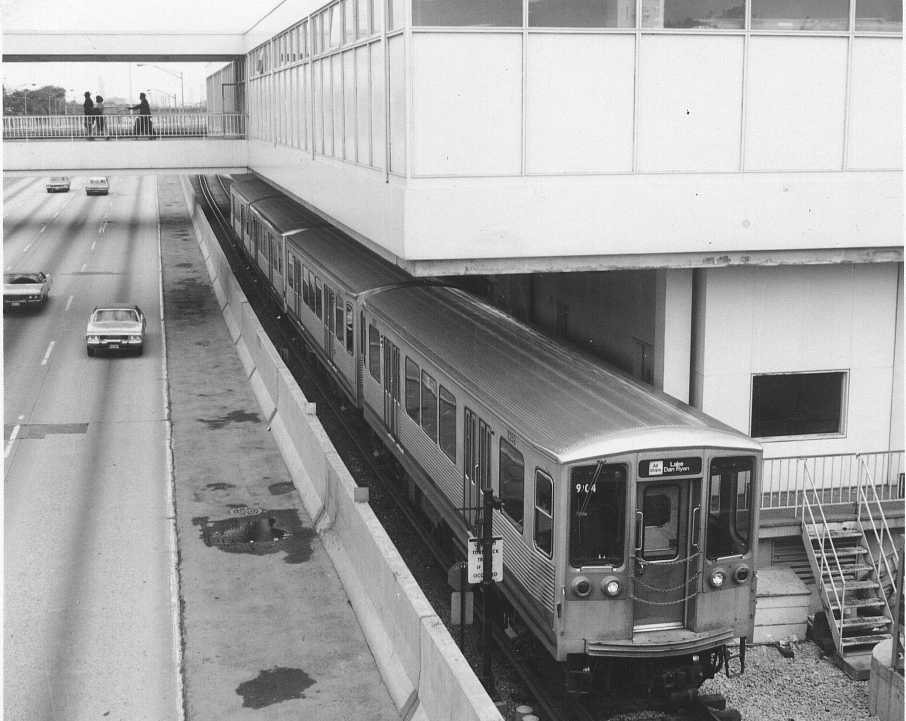
- Lake–Dan Ryan train at 95th/Dan Ryan station

Overview
- Status: Defunct
- Locale: Chicago, Oak Park and Forest Park, Illinois, United States
- Termini: Harlem; 95th
- Stations: 27

Service
- Type: Rapid transit
- System: Chicago "L"
- Operator: Chicago Transit Authority

History
- Opened: September 28, 1969; 56 years ago
- Closed: February 21, 1993; 33 years ago

Technical
- Line length: 18 mi
- Character: Elevated, Expressway median
- Track gauge: 4 ft 8 1/2 in (1,435 mm)
- Minimum radius: 90 feet (27 m)
- Electrification: Third rail, 600 V DC
Route map
Lake–Dan Ryan route highlighted in gray

The Lake–Dan Ryan was a rail rapid transit route formerly operated by the Chicago Transit Authority (CTA). The Lake–Dan Ryan existed from the opening of the Dan Ryan branch on September 28, 1969, until February 21, 1993 during a service overhaul. When created, the route united two transit corridors that until 1969 never had through rail service. This routing, which became known as the West-South route, operated from the Harlem terminal in Forest Park on the Lake Street "L" through downtown Chicago along the Union Loop, and then via the old South Side "L" and the new Dan Ryan Line to the 95th Street Terminal. The Lake–Dan Ryan service was planned in conjunction with the former Franklin Street Connector and Chicago Central Area Transit Project (Loop and Distributor Subways), both of which were never constructed. The section of the route between the junction with the South Side "L" at 17th and State Streets and the Cermak–Chinatown Station was originally an "interim", or temporary facility. It was planned to be torn down when the Loop Subway system was completed, but survived after the project was canceled in 1979. That section was improved in the 1980s and early 1990s and is currently being used by the Orange Line. Train transfers are possible by using the two unused tracks.

== History ==
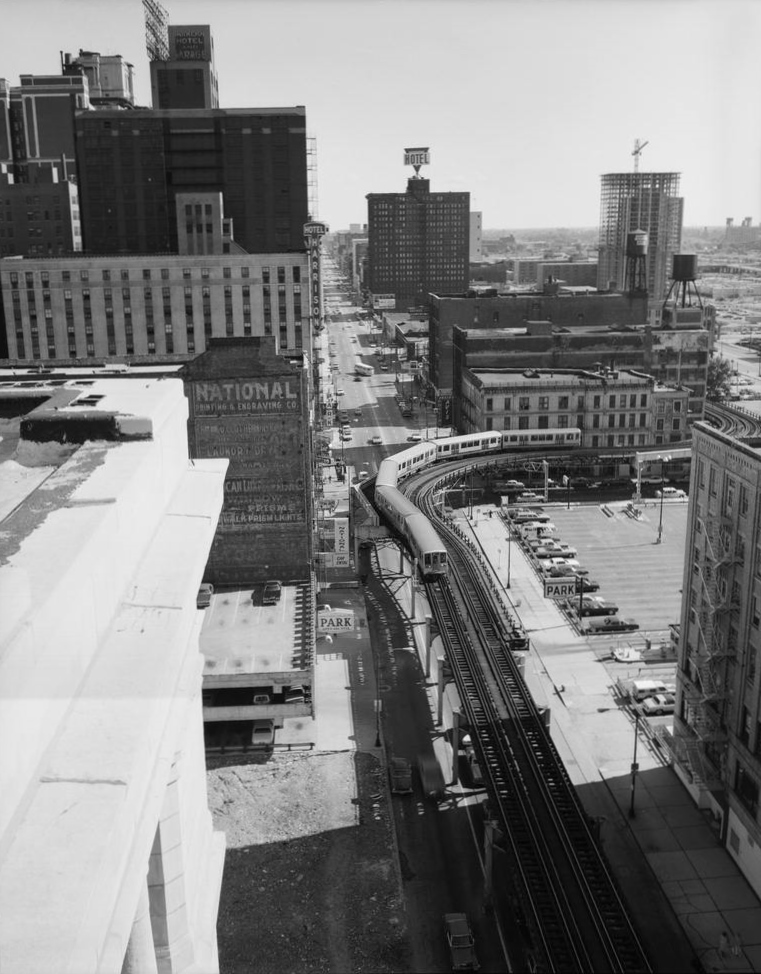
Lake–Dan Ryan train at Wabash Avenue and Harrison Street

The Lake Street branch, Chicago's second oldest elevated rail line, began operations on November 6, 1893, from Madison and Market Streets (present-day Wacker Drive) to California Avenue and Lake Street. It was built by the Lake Street Elevated Railroad Company and originally equipped with small 0-4-4T Forney type steam locomotives hauling wooden coaches. Electrification of the road was completed between 1894 and 1896. "L" service was subsequently extended west into the western suburbs of Oak Park in 1899 and Forest Park in 1910. The Lake Street branch was also the first "L" road to operate around the Union Loop "L" on September 3, 1897, five weeks before its official inauguration. Shortly after the CTA assumed control of the city's bus and rail systems, Lake Street service was changed with the closing of several stations (Morgan, Racine, Ogden, Damen, Oakley, Sacramento, Hamlin, Kostner, Menard, and Lombard) and the old Market Street stub in 1948. The western 2.6-mile (4.2 km) section between Laramie Avenue and the Forest Park terminal, which consisted of at-grade trackage, was elevated onto the adjacent Union Pacific Railroad embankment on October 28, 1962. The grade separation improvement (one of CTA's 1958 New Horizons programs) alleviated 22 street level crossings which plagued pedestrian, auto, and rapid transit movements for nearly 70 years.

Following the successful introduction of the Congress Line in the median of the Eisenhower Expressway in June 1958, the City of Chicago began construction on two more expressway rapid transit extensions in 1967: the Milwaukee branch from Logan Square to Jefferson Park via Kennedy Expressway, and the Dan Ryan Expressway Line from 17th Street to 95th Street. The nine stations, located at Cermak–Chinatown, Sox–35th, 47th, Garfield, 63rd, 69th, 79th, 87th, and the 95th Street Terminal, were designed by the architectural firm of Skidmore, Owings & Merrill, under the direction of Myron Goldsmith who emphasized a modernist approach to their design in the fashion of his mentor and predecessor, Ludwig Mies van der Rohe. However, no station was planned at Roosevelt/Wabash (until 1987) because of its close proximity to the State Street subway, and because the "L" was going to be torn down and Dan Ryan (and eventually Midway) service shifted into the Franklin Street Connector and into the Loop. It was also considered to route Dan Ryan service to the North Side before its construction from 1967 to 1969. Funding for the Kennedy and Dan Ryan rail projects would not allow for the necessary connections to the State Street subway at the time, so, it was decided to combine the Lake Street "L" with the new Dan Ryan Line uniting the West and South Sides of the City. On September 28, 1969, Lake–Dan Ryan service began from the 95th Street Terminal north to downtown Chicago via the Union Loop "L" and west to Harlem.

Traffic on both legs of the Lake–Dan Ryan route was nearly level until the mid-1970s when passenger volumes began to shift on the West-South route and the North-South route (Howard–Englewood/Jackson Park), inclusive, with heavier traffic on the Howard and Dan Ryan branches, and lesser traffic on the Lake Street and South Side branches. In February 1993, the CTA overhauled its system and launched a color-coded route plan. In the process, the Lake–Dan Ryan route was split. The Lake Street branch running west of the Loop became a part of the Green Line, and the Dan Ryan branch running south of the Loop became a part of the Red Line.

On February 4, 1977, a train on the Lake–Dan Ryan route was involved in the worst accident in CTA history, the Chicago Loop Derailment, where the train operator ignored a cab signal and rear ended a Ravenswood train parked at the nearby State/Lake station. This killed 11 and injured nearly 200 people.

== Operating fleet ==
From 1969 to 1983, the 2000-series cars were used on the Lake–Dan Ryan route; from 1969 to 1983, the 2200-series; the 2400-series cars from 1983 to 1993; and finally the 2600-series cars from 1984 to 1993.
