= Cermak–Chinatown station =

Chicago "L" station

Cermak-Chinatown 2200S 200W
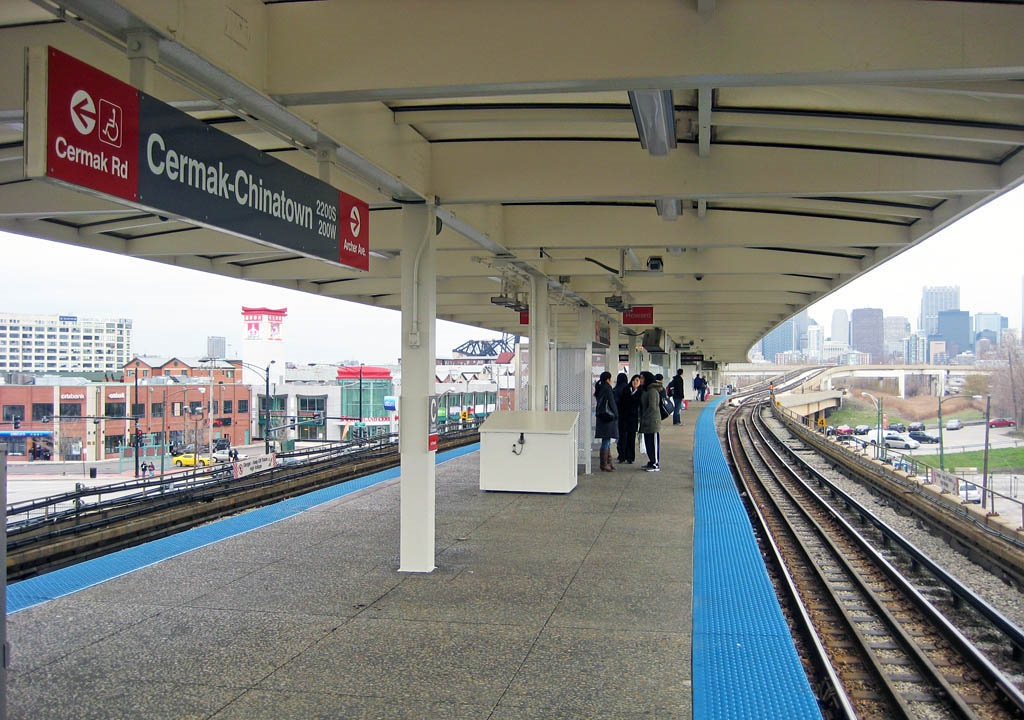
- Station platform, looking north towards Federal Junction and the Orange Line tracks

General information
- Location: 138 West Cermak Road; Chicago, Illinois 60616
- Coordinates: 41.853206°N 87.630968°W
- Owner: Chicago Transit Authority
- Line: Dan Ryan Branch
- Platforms: 1 Island platform
- Tracks: 2
- Connections: CTA bus

Construction
- Structure type: Elevated
- Parking: Yes
- Cycle facilities: Yes (south entrance only)
- Accessible: Yes

History
- Opened: September 26, 1969 (formal opening); September 28, 1969 (full service)
- Rebuilt: 2009–11 (renovation); 2013 (refurbished)
- Former names: Cermak (station sign)

Passengers
- 2025: 1,681,754 ▲48.6%

Services
Preceding station	Chicago "L"	Following station
Roosevelt toward Howard	Red Line	Sox–35th toward 95th/Dan Ryan
Former services
Preceding station	Chicago "L"	Following station
Adams/Wabash toward Harlem/Lake	Lake–Dan Ryan route	Sox–35th toward 95th/Dan Ryan
Track layout
Location

Cermak–Chinatown is an 'L' station on the CTA's Red Line. The station is located in Chicago's Chinatown neighborhood and contains many elements of Chinese culture in its architecture.

The station has two tile murals with "Welcome to Chinatown" also written in Chinese. Passengers using the stairs or escalator are welcomed by a couple of lion statues, called "foo dogs," meant to protect against evil spirits at the entrance. The bins on the platform are painted in red and green, the Chinese color for prosperity and longevity, with Welcome written in Chinese on the next one.

Like the other eight stations of the Dan Ryan Branch, Cermak–Chinatown was built by Skidmore, Owings & Merrill, looking identical to 95th/Dan Ryan. It is the only station on the Dan Ryan Branch not in an expressway median. Customers outside the station can also see Chinese character masks of Chinese opera and theater productions on the walls. Cermak–Chinatown is open 24/7 as part of the service on the Red Line. In 2014, an annual total of 1,567,588 passengers boarded this station.

== History ==
=== Truck collision ===
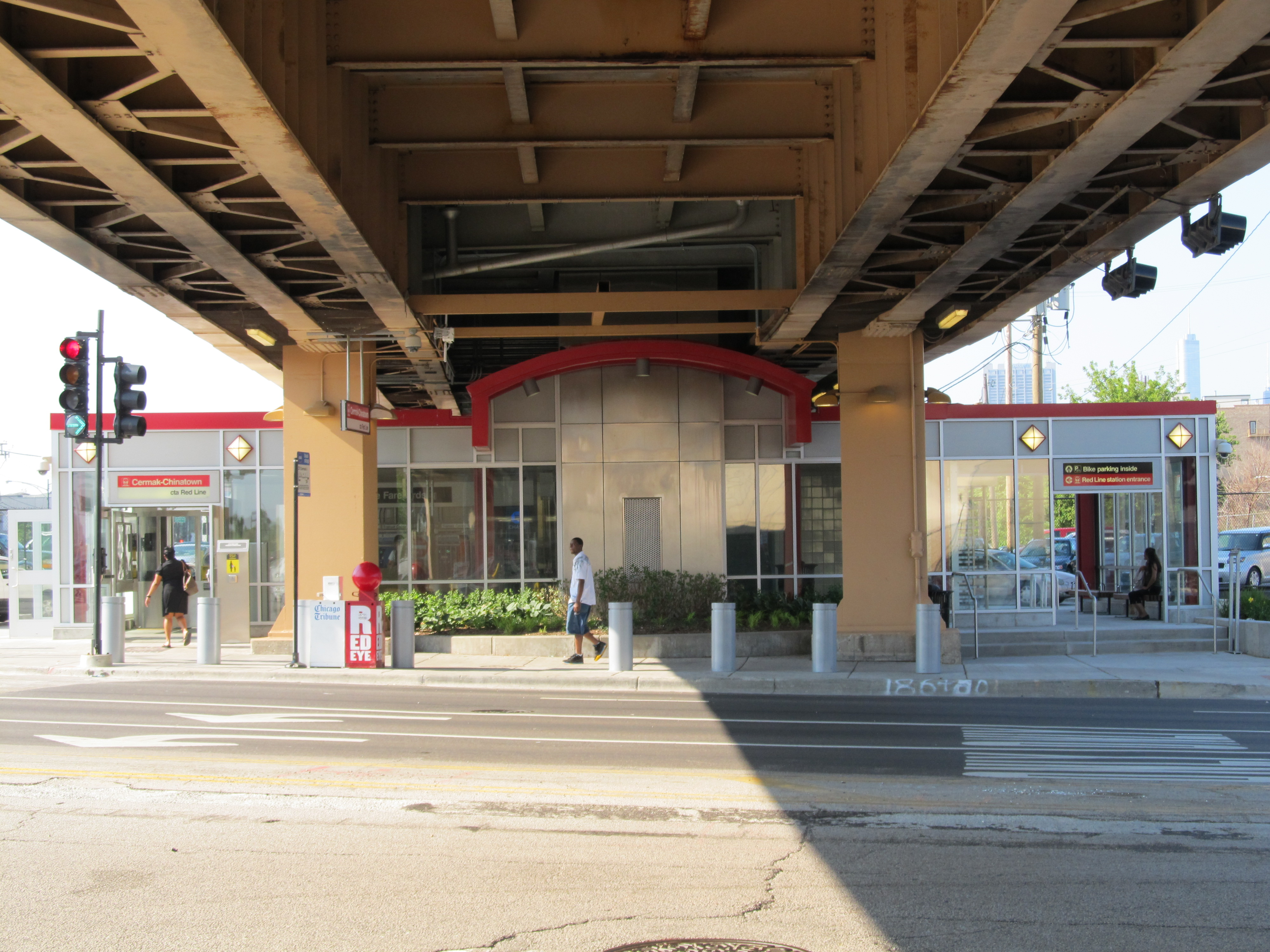
The new main entrance in 2011

On April 25, 2008, a semi truck crashed into the station, killing two and injuring 21, at least seven critically. Part of the station collapsed after the impact. Bystanders said that the driver of the truck was coming off the northbound Dan Ryan Expressway exit. The truck driver was taken into custody and died later in the year.

=== Renovation ===
The original station had undergone updates since its opening in 1969. After the truck collision, however, CTA officials planned to fully rebuild the station house, with construction beginning in fall 2009. On June 4, 2010, a new auxiliary entrance/exit opened at Archer Avenue, to provide convenient access to 62 Archer buses as well as to Chinatown Square and the Richland Center. On April 15, 2011, the main entrance on the north side of Cermak Road reopened and was upgraded with an elevator making it accessible to people with disabilities. The auxiliary entrance on the south side of Cermak Road reopened on April 30, 2011.

Cermak-Chinatown, like all Dan Ryan Branch Red Line stations, closed from May 19, 2013 to October 20, 2013 for the Red Line South Reconstruction Project. A free shuttle bus carried passengers from Cermak-Chinatown to Roosevelt to allow connections to the rerouted Red Line trains on the South Side Elevated.

== Bus connections ==
CTA

- 21 Cermak
- 24 Wentworth (weekdays only)
- 62 Archer
