= Garfield station (CTA Red Line) =

Chicago "L" station

Garfield 5500S 200W
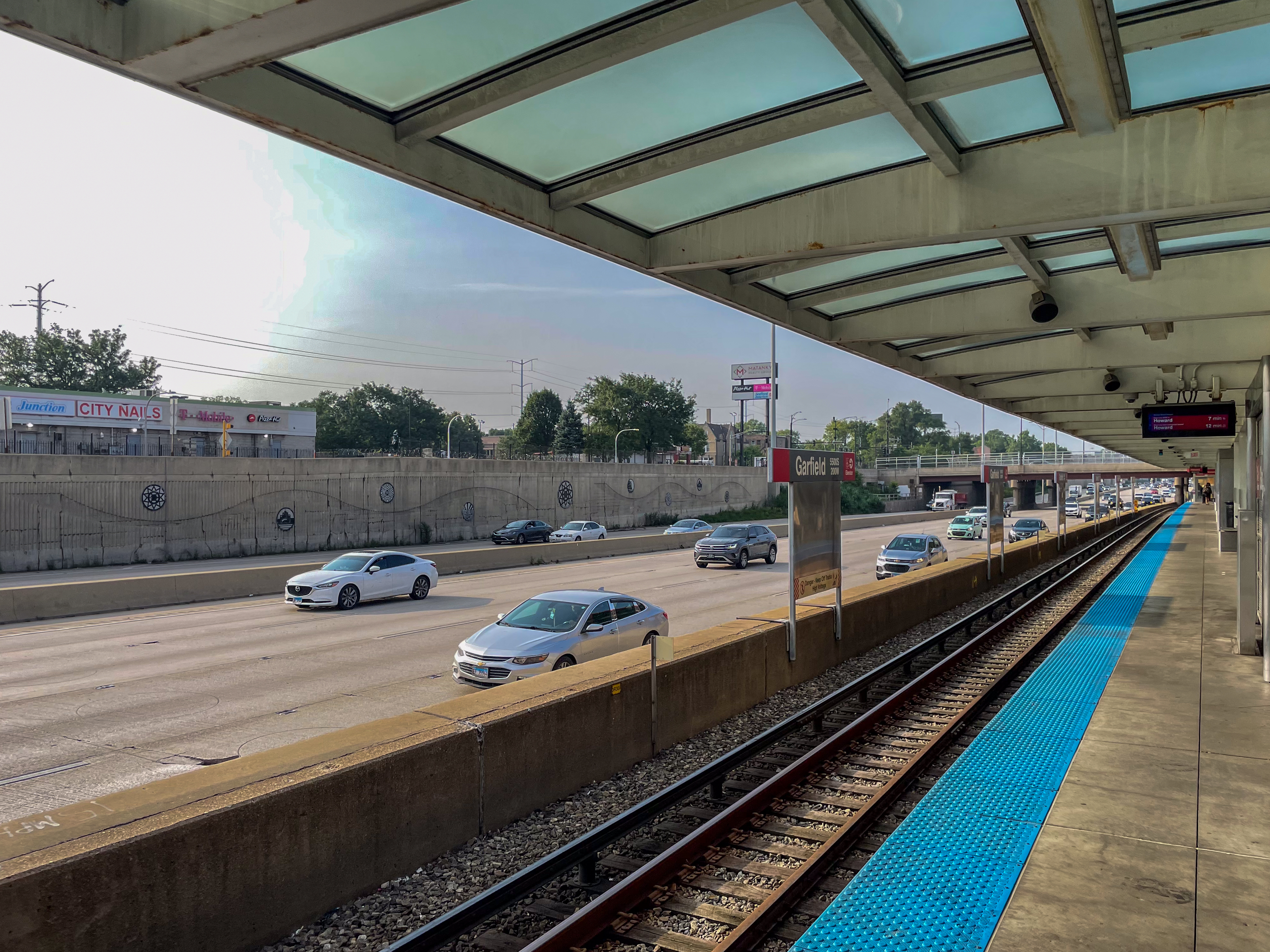

General information
- Location: 220 West Garfield Boulevard; Chicago, Illinois 60609
- Coordinates: 41.79542°N 87.631157°W
- Owner: Chicago Transit Authority
- Line: Dan Ryan branch
- Platforms: 1 island platform
- Tracks: 2
- Connections: CTA bus

Construction
- Structure type: Expressway median
- Parking: No
- Cycle facilities: No
- Accessible: Yes

History
- Opened: September 26, 1969 (formal opening); September 28, 1969 (full service)
- Rebuilt: 2005–06 (renovation); 2013 (refurbished, new elevator installed)

Passengers
- 2025: 708,462 ▲25.9%

Services
Preceding station	Chicago "L"	Following station
47th toward Howard	Red Line	63rd toward 95th/Dan Ryan
Track layout
Location

Garfield is an "L" station on the CTA's Red Line. The station is located in the median of the Dan Ryan Expressway. It is located in the Fuller Park neighborhood. This is the Red Line's closest stop to the University of Chicago and the Museum of Science and Industry, although the museum is more than two miles away. The station shares its name with its Green Line equivalent.

== History ==
=== Structure ===
Like the eight other stations on the Dan Ryan Branch, Garfield station was built by architect Skidmore, Owings & Merrill under a simple design. The station opened on September 28, 1969, and was entirely renovated from 2005 to 2006. The renovation has allowed the embellishment of the station, thanks to the installation of a work of art in the main entrance of the station. The only difference with respect to its colleagues of Dan Ryan Branch, is that for technical reasons a canopy identical to the others could not be added. Garfield station thus contains its original canopy and the covered zones over the Dan Ryan Expressway thanks to the stowing of panels, installed in a different way with the bridge.

=== 2013 renovation ===
In 2013, the station was renovated with a new elevator installed (along with 87th and 63rd) as part of the Red Line South Reconstruction project and made all the stations on the Dan Ryan branch accessible.

== Bus connections ==
CTA

- 24 Wentworth (weekdays only)
- 55 Garfield (Owl Service)
- 59 59th/61st (Monday–Saturday only)
