= Fuller Park =

Fuller Park may refer to a place in the United States:

- Fuller Park, Chicago, Illinois, a community area
- Fuller Park (Chicago park), a park within the community area
- T. O. Fuller State Park, Memphis, Tennessee
