= 47th station (CTA Red Line) =

Chicago "L" station

47th 4700S 200W
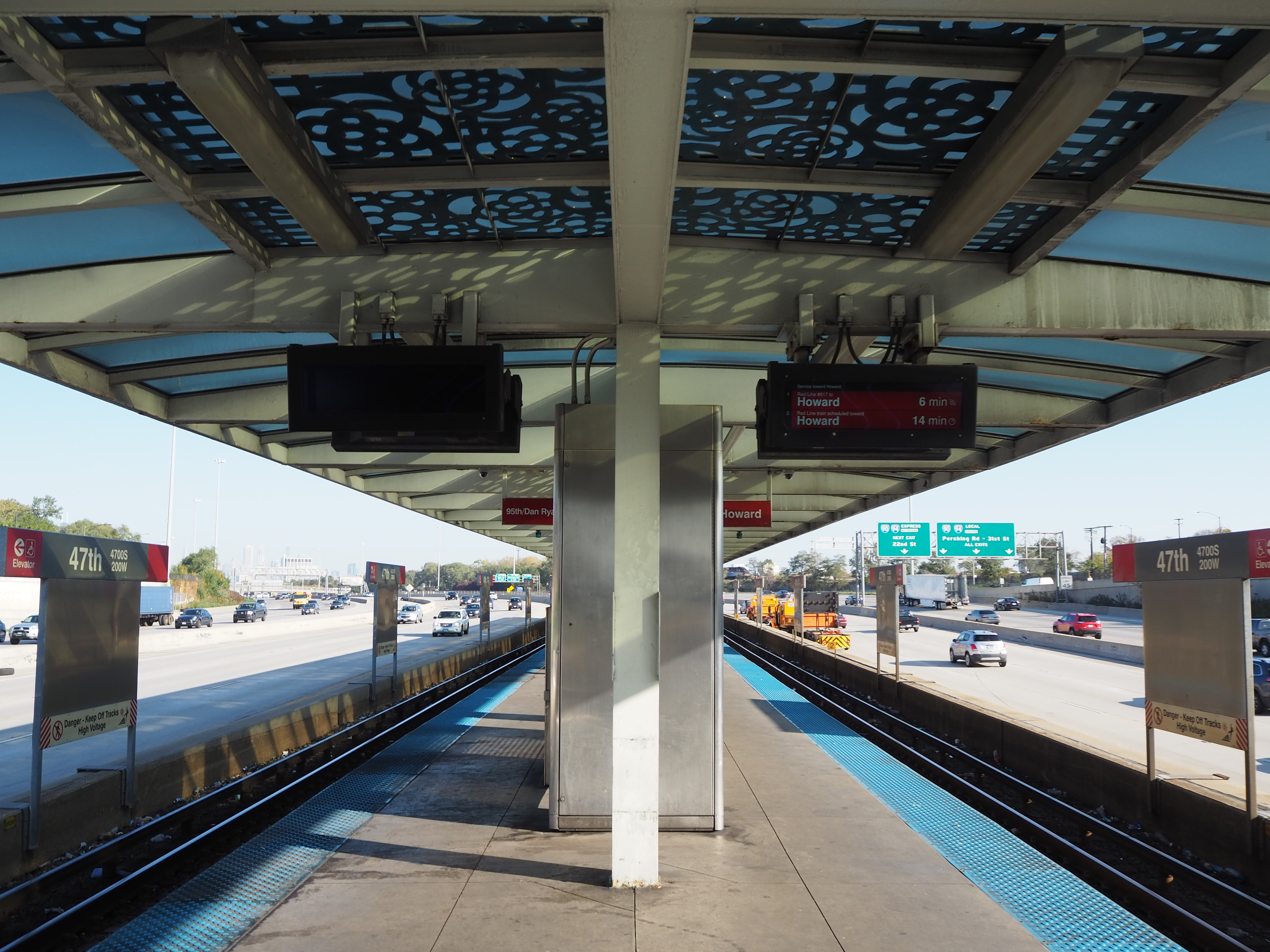

General information
- Location: 220 West 47th Street; Chicago, Illinois 60609
- Coordinates: 41.810318°N 87.63094°W
- Owner: Chicago Transit Authority
- Line: Dan Ryan Branch
- Platforms: 1 Island platform
- Tracks: 2
- Connections: CTA bus

Construction
- Structure type: Expressway median
- Parking: No
- Cycle facilities: Yes
- Accessible: Yes

History
- Opened: September 26, 1969 (formal opening); September 28, 1969 (full service)
- Rebuilt: 2005–06 (renovation); 2013 (refurbished)
- Former names: 47th/Wentworth (station sign)

Passengers
- 2025: 632,907 ▲36%

Services
| Preceding station | Chicago "L" | Following station |
|---|---|---|
| Sox–35th toward Howard | Red Line | Garfield toward 95th/Dan Ryan |
Track layout
Location

47th is a station on the Chicago Transit Authority's 'L' system, serving the Red Line. The station is located in the median of the Dan Ryan Expressway in the Fuller Park neighborhood. Access to the station is available from a staircase at the middle of the north side of the 47th Street overpass, where an open canopy crosswalk with traffic signals leads to a bus stop on the south side of the overpass.

47th closed from May 19, 2013 to October 20, 2013, as part of the Red Line Reconstruction Project.

== History ==
=== 2005–2006 renovations ===
On December 12, 2006, an elevator was put in service at the 47th station, making the station accessible to people with disabilities. Sixteen days later, on the 28th, escalators began service in the station as well. The glass canopy above the crosswalk outside of 47th station was improved to include images of the Stock Yards 'L' line that operated over a decade before the Red Line.

== Bus connections ==
CTA

- 15 Jeffery Local
- 24 Wentworth (weekdays only)
- 43 43rd
- 47 47th
- 51 51st
