= 69th station =

Chicago "L" station

69th 6900S 0E/0W
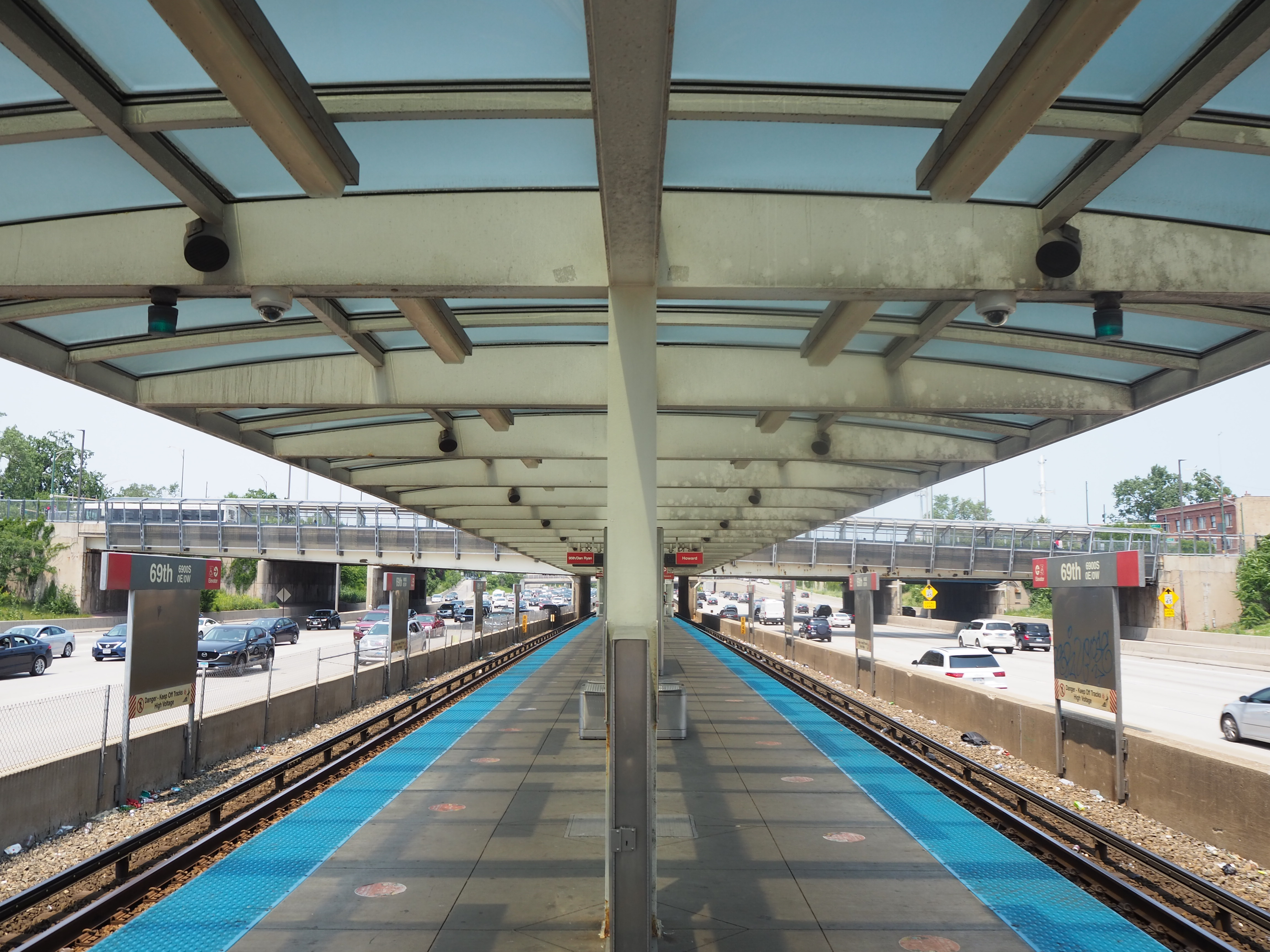

General information
- Location: 15 West 69th Street; Chicago, Illinois 60621
- Coordinates: 41.768367°N 87.625724°W
- Owner: Chicago Transit Authority
- Line: Dan Ryan Branch
- Platforms: 1 Island platform
- Tracks: 2
- Connections: CTA bus

Construction
- Structure type: Expressway median
- Parking: No
- Cycle facilities: No
- Accessible: Yes

History
- Opened: September 26, 1969 (formal opening); September 28, 1969 (full service)
- Rebuilt: 2005–06 (renovation); 2013 (refurbished)
- Former names: 69th/State (station sign)

Passengers
- 2025: 887,634 ▲15.3%

Services
Preceding station	Chicago "L"	Following station
63rd toward Howard	Red Line	79th toward 95th/Dan Ryan
Track layout
Location

69th is a station on the Chicago Transit Authority's 'L' system, serving the Red Line. The station is located in the median of the Dan Ryan Expressway, within the Greater Grand Crossing neighborhood. This station connects with the second most bus routes (first is 95th/Dan Ryan) on the Dan Ryan Branch, and is one of the terminals for the N5 South Shore Night Bus (the other is 95th/Dan Ryan). This makes it an important connection for buses, especially Night Owl connections.

69th closed from May to October 2013 as part of the Red Line South Reconstruction project.

== History ==
The Normal Park Branch, built by the South Side Elevated Railroad, ran as a short shuttle service from Harvard station to Parnell and 69th Street, a half mile west from the Dan Ryan. This service had very low ridership and the line was demolished by 1954.

69th was built in a modern, International style featuring large amounts of steel and glass and very little amenities, to complement the design of the brand new stainless-steel 2200 series trains that ran on the brand-new line.

== Bus connections ==
CTA

- N5 South Shore Night Bus (Owl Service – overnight only)
- 29 State
- 30 South Chicago (Monday–Saturday only)
- 67 67th/69th/71st
- 71 71st/South Shore
- 169 69th/UPS Express (Weekday UPS shifts only)
