= 79th station =

Chicago "L" station

79th 7900S 0E/0W
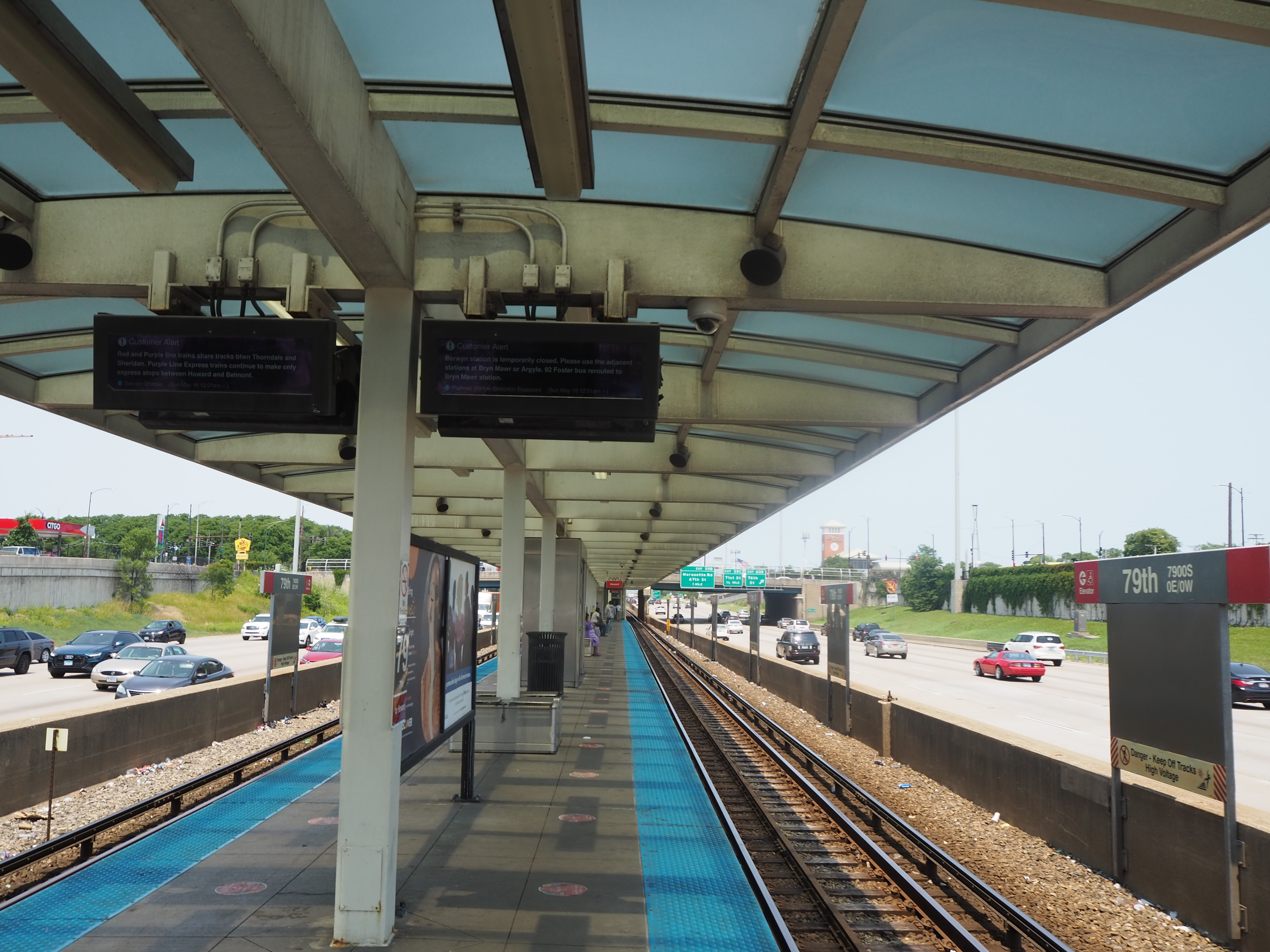

General information
- Location: 15 West 79th Street; Chicago, Illinois 60620
- Coordinates: 41.750419°N 87.625112°W
- Owner: Chicago Transit Authority
- Line: Dan Ryan Branch
- Platforms: 1 Island platform
- Tracks: 2
- Connections: CTA bus

Construction
- Structure type: Expressway median
- Parking: No
- Cycle facilities: Yes
- Accessible: Yes

History
- Opened: September 26, 1969 (formal opening); September 28, 1969 (full service)
- Rebuilt: 1977–80 (new entrance, elevator added); 2005–06 (renovation); 2013 (refurbished)
- Former names: 79th/State (station sign)

Passengers
- 2025: 1,240,344 ▲21.9%

Services
Preceding station	Chicago "L"	Following station
69th toward Howard	Red Line	87th toward 95th/Dan Ryan
Track layout
Location

79th is a station on the Chicago Transit Authority's 'L' system, serving the Dan Ryan branch of the Red Line. The station is located in the median of the Dan Ryan Expressway. It was the first station on the Dan Ryan branch to feature an elevator for accessibility. The station's location is between the Greater Grand Crossing and Chatham neighborhoods.

79th closed from May 19, 2013, to October 20, 2013, for the Red Line South Reconstruction Project.

== Bus connections ==
CTA

- 8A South Halsted
- 24 Wentworth (Weekdays only)
- 29 State
- 75 74th/75th
- 79 79th (Owl Service)
