= 63rd station =

Chicago "L" station

63rd 6300S 200W
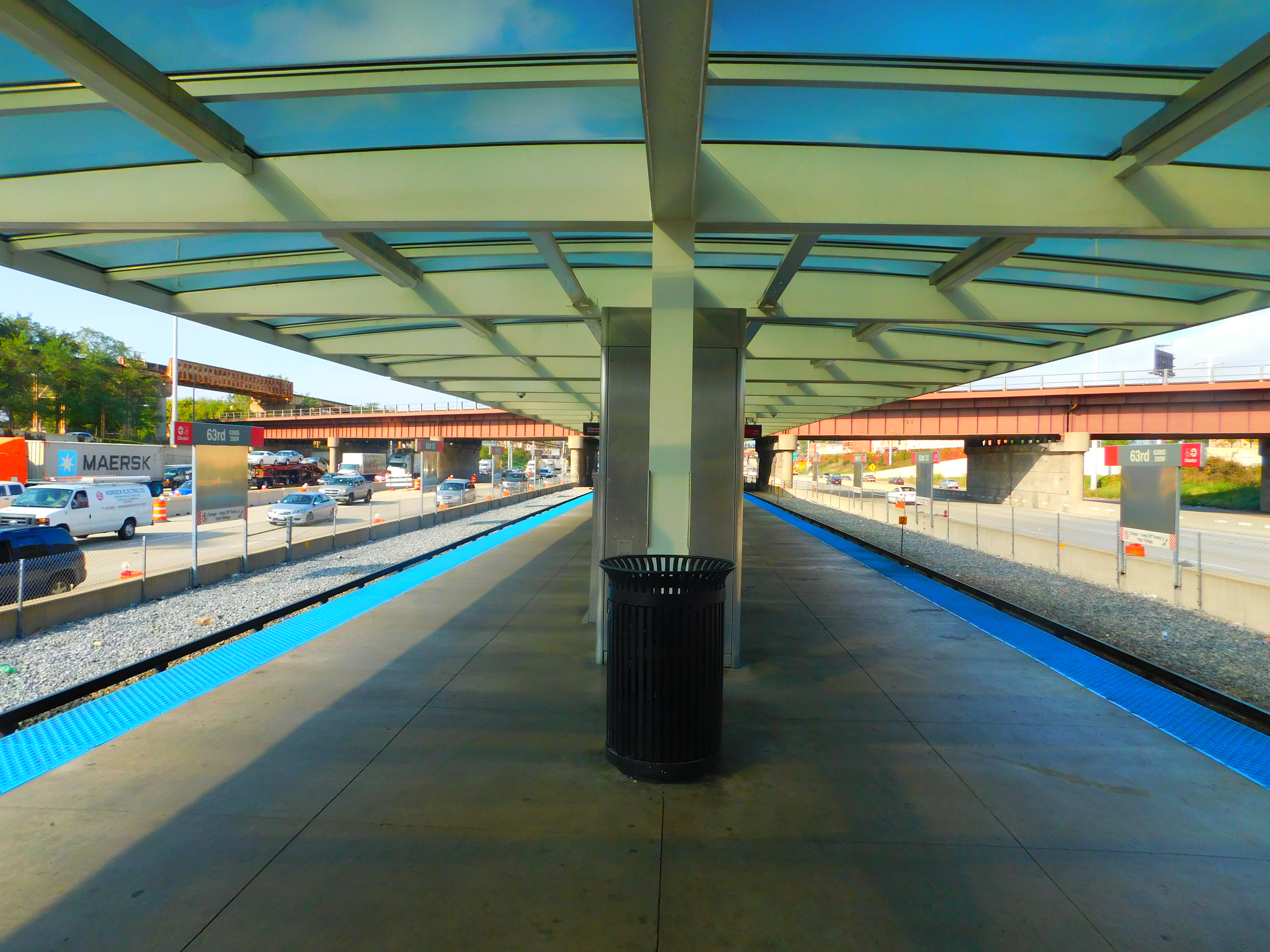
- Station platform, looking north. The Green Line's Ashland branch is visible on the left.

General information
- Location: 220 West 63rd Street; Chicago, Illinois 60621
- Coordinates: 41.780536°N 87.630952°W
- Owner: Chicago Transit Authority
- Line: Dan Ryan Branch
- Platforms: 1 Island platform
- Tracks: 2
- Connections: CTA bus

Construction
- Structure type: Expressway median
- Parking: No
- Cycle facilities: No
- Accessible: Yes

History
- Opened: September 26, 1969 (formal opening); September 28, 1969 (full service)
- Rebuilt: 2005–06 (renovation); 2013 (refurbished, new elevator installed)
- Former names: 63rd/Wentworth (station sign)

Passengers
- 2025: 576,671 ▲29.3%

Services
Preceding station	Chicago "L"	Following station
Garfield toward Howard	Red Line	69th toward 95th/Dan Ryan
Track layout
Location

63rd is a station on the Chicago Transit Authority's 'L' system, serving the Red Line. The station is located in the median of the Dan Ryan Expressway and serves the Englewood neighborhood. It is near the former site of the Englewood Union Station, which served the Pennsylvania Railroad, New York Central, and Rock Island Lines. The former Pennsylvania Railroad tracks (now NS owned) pass over the station. Also visible from the station is the Ashland branch of the Green Line which runs on an elevated structure immediately west of the expressway at the location before turning west on 63rd Street.

== History ==
=== Structure ===
Like the eight other stations of the Dan Ryan Branch, 63rd was built by architect Skidmore, Owings & Merrill under a simple design. The station opened on September 28, 1969, before being entirely renovated from 2005 to 2006.

=== 2013 renovation ===
In 2013, the station was renovated with a new elevator installed (along with Garfield and 87th) as part of the Red Line South Reconstruction project and made all the stations on the Dan Ryan branch accessible.

== Bus connections ==
CTA

- 24 Wentworth (weekdays only)
- 63 63rd (Owl Service)
