= Interstate 90/94 =

Interstate 90/94 exists as a concurrency as:

- Dan Ryan Expressway, a freeway in Chicago that runs from the Circle Interchange with Interstate 290 near Downtown Chicago through the South Side of the city
- Kennedy Expressway, a freeway in metropolitan Chicago, Illinois that travels northwest from the neighborhood of West Loop to O'Hare International Airport
- From Tomah to Madison in Wisconsin
