= 87th station =

Chicago 'L' station

87th 8700S 0E/0W
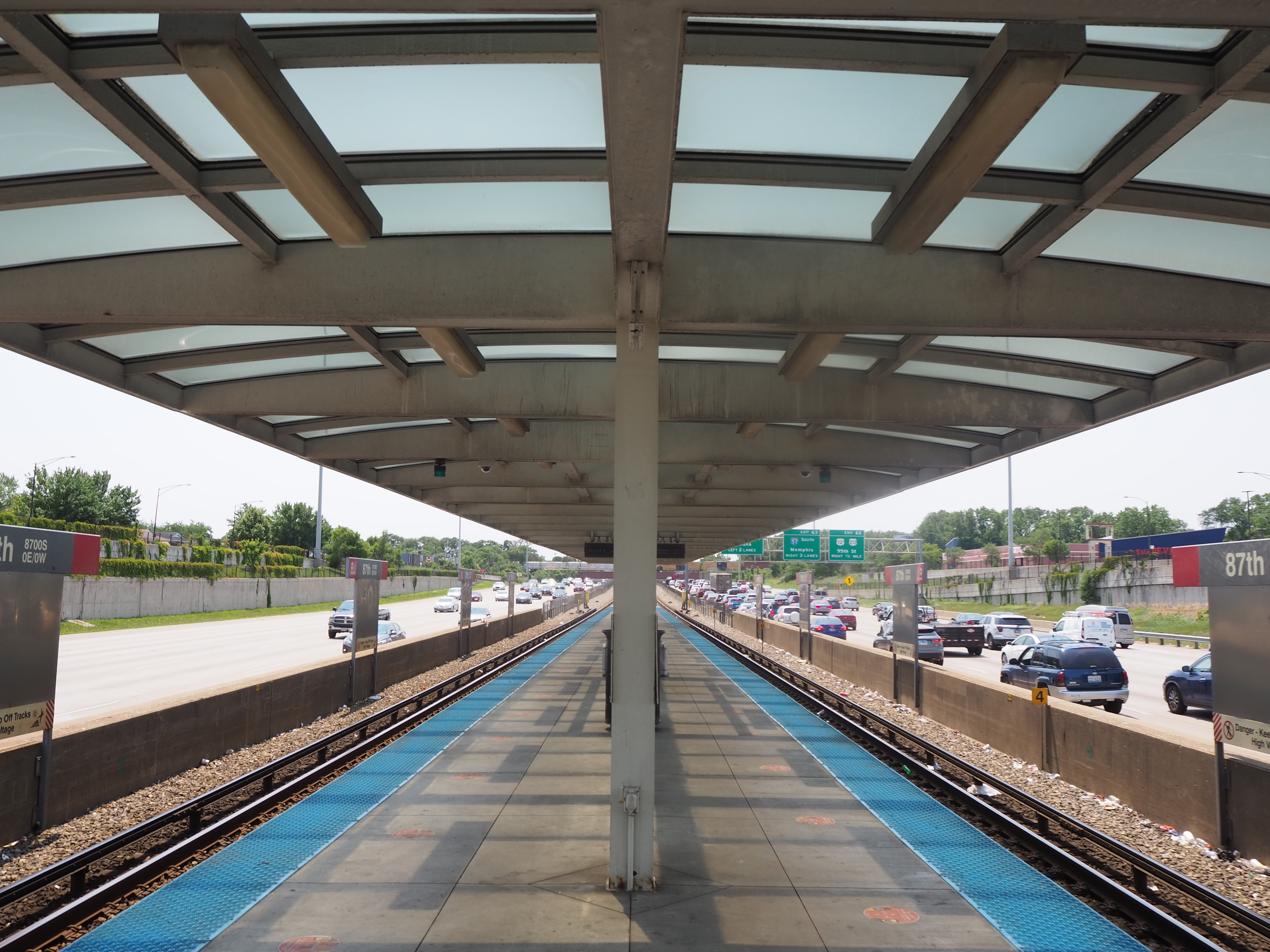
- The station in 2021

General information
- Location: 15 West 87th Street; Chicago, Illinois 60620
- Coordinates: 41.735372°N 87.624717°W
- Owner: Chicago Transit Authority
- Line: Dan Ryan Branch
- Platforms: 1 Island platform
- Tracks: 2
- Connections: CTA bus

Construction
- Structure type: Expressway median
- Parking: No
- Cycle facilities: No
- Accessible: Yes

History
- Opened: September 26, 1969 (formal opening); September 28, 1969 (full service)
- Rebuilt: 2005–06 (renovation); 2013 (refurbished, new elevator installed)
- Former names: 87th/State (station sign)

Passengers
- 2025: 689,288 ▲20.2%

Services
Preceding station	Chicago "L"	Following station
79th toward Howard	Red Line	95th/Dan Ryan Terminus
Track layout
Location

87th is an 'L' station on the Chicago Transit Authority's Red Line. The station is located in the median of the Dan Ryan Expressway and serves the Chatham neighborhood. There are two entrances to the station, one on the south side of the 87th Street overpass which served as the only entrance from 1969 until 2006 and one on the north side of the overpass which was opened as part of the Dan Ryan Red Line Rehabilitation Project.

== History ==
=== 2013 renovation ===
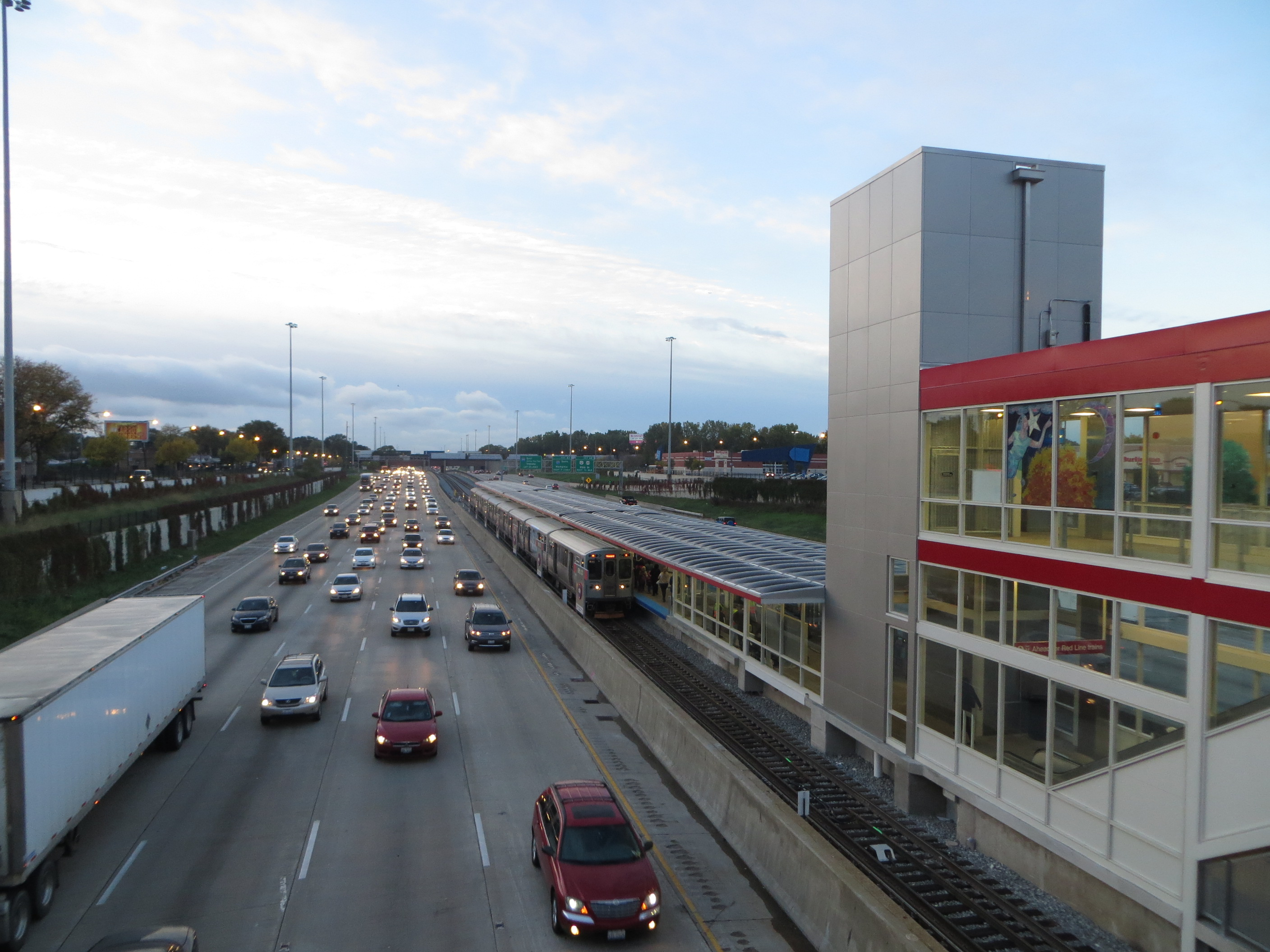
The station in 2013

In 2013, the station was renovated with a new elevator installed (along with Garfield and 63rd) as part of the Red Line South Reconstruction project and made all the stations on the Dan Ryan branch accessible.

== Bus connections ==
CTA

- 29 State
- 87 87th (Owl Service)
