= Dan Ryan branch =

Segment of the Chicago "L"

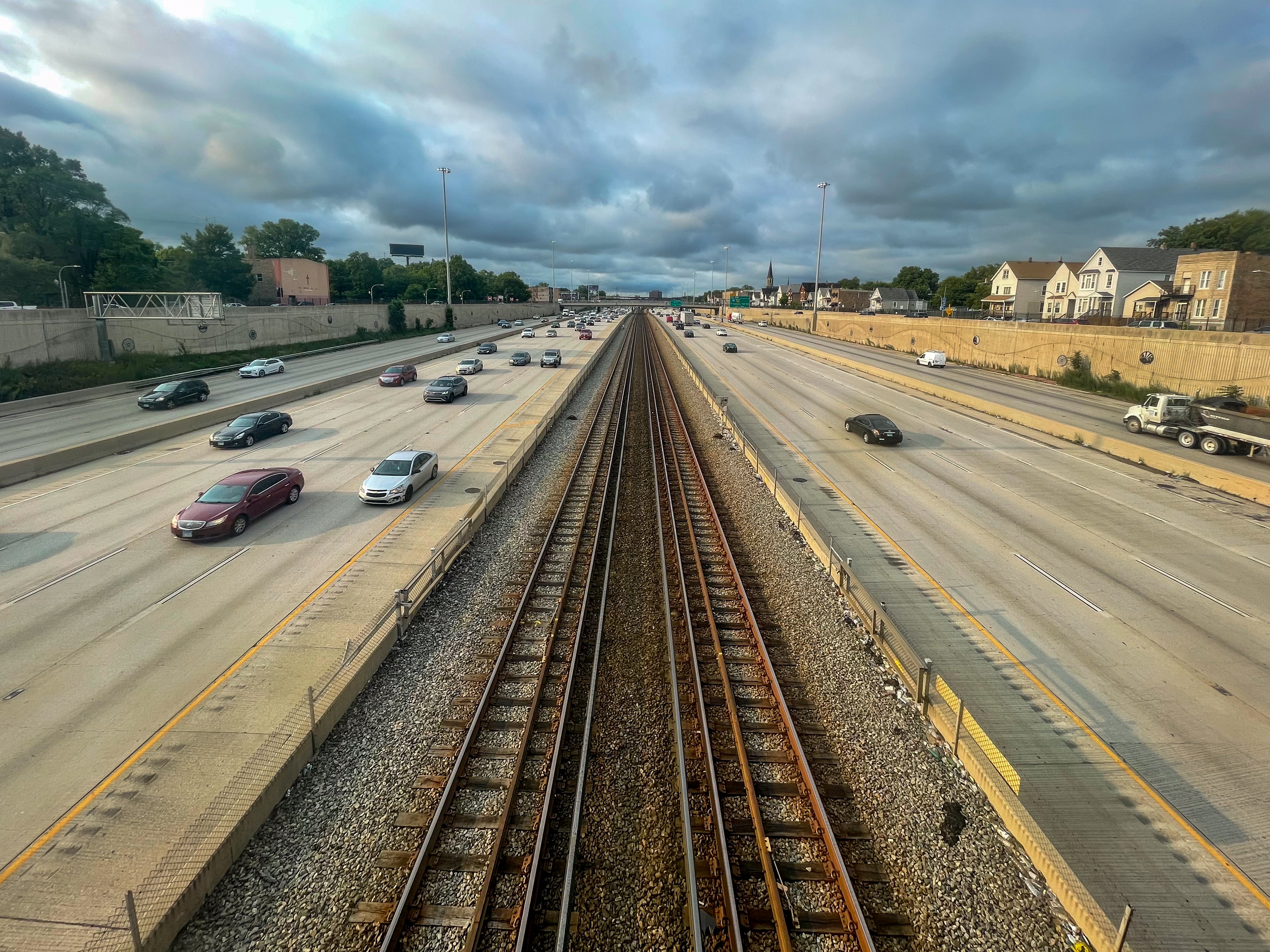
- Dan Ryan branch south of Garfield station

Overview
- Status: In Service
- Locale: Chicago, Illinois, United States
- Termini: Cermak–Chinatown; 95th/Dan Ryan
- Stations: 9(4 under construction)

Service
- Type: Rapid transit
- System: Chicago "L"
- Services: Red
- Operator: Chicago Transit Authority
- Rolling stock: 5000-series
- Daily ridership: 39,639 (average weekday 2019)

History
- Opened: September 28, 1969; 57 years ago

Technical
- Line length: 9.4 mi (15.1 km)
- Character: Expressway median, Elevated
- Track gauge: 4 ft 8 1/2 in (1,435 mm) standard gauge
- Electrification: Third rail, 600 V DC

The Dan Ryan branch is a 9.4 mi (15.1 km) long section of the Chicago "L" system located on the South Side of Chicago, Illinois. It is operated by the Chicago Transit Authority, as part of its Red Line service and is normally through-routed downtown towards the North Side via the State Street subway. As of February 2013, the branch serves (on average) 45,355 passengers per weekday. As part of the CTA's busiest rapid transit line, it is operated 24 hours a day, 365 days a year. The branch serves the Chinatown, Armour Square, Fuller Park, Englewood, Greater Grand Crossing, Chatham and Roseland neighborhoods.

== History ==
After World War II, the CTA built three new branches of the "L" through the medians of freeways. The first was the Congress Branch, which opened on June 22, 1958. On July 30, 1958, proposals for a line in the median of the Dan Ryan Expressway and a line in the median of the Kennedy Expressway were among a series of projects proposed by the CTA. The Dan Ryan branch was built between 1967 and 1969 for a total cost of $38 million. When the branch opened on September 28, 1969, it was connected to the Lake Street Elevated via the Loop and the South Side Main Line. The branch was successful from the start, exceeding forecasts by 10%, and carrying an average of 99,000 passengers per day by the end of 1970. The opening of the Dan Ryan branch resulted in a decrease in ridership on the South Side Elevated and its two branches to Englewood and Jackson Park. On January 4, 1978, several large cracks were discovered under the elevated portion of the Dan Ryan branch near Clark and 18th Streets. Service was suspended on this portion of the branch from January 4 to January 17, while repairs were being made.

On February 21, 1993, when the L routes were to be color-coded, the Dan Ryan branch became part of the present day Red Line. The CTA had decided that the Dan Ryan Branch's routing was inefficient due to the fact that the Dan Ryan branch and North Side Main Line had a comparatively higher number of riders than the Lake Stret Elevated and South Side Elevated. On February 21, 1993, the Dan Ryan branch was connected to the State Street subway and the North Side Main Line with service to Howard, while the Lake Branch would be paired with the South Side Elevated and its Englewood and Jackson Park branches via The Loop to form the Green Line. The Dan Ryan branch connected to the State Street subway via the subway's new extension to 16th and Wentworth, which was built from 1985 to 1990.

The Dan Ryan branch initially used concrete railroad ties, but these were replaced by wooden ties after the concrete ties began to age more rapidly than expected. On April 17, 2004, the CTA began a $192.5 million rehabilitation of the Dan Ryan branch, which included installing a new signal system, replacing and upgrading substations, renovating platform canopies, and installing new elevators at the 47th and 69th stations.

=== Red Line South reconstruction project ===
On November 3, 2011, local funding and $646 million in state funding was announced by Mayor Rahm Emanuel, Governor Pat Quinn, CTA President Forrest Claypool, several state lawmakers, and nearly a dozen aldermen, for a reconstruction project on the branch. Two options concerning the duration of construction were considered: a five-month duration with no service the entire time, or four years of weekend only work. The choice was for the five-month period and no services.

On May 19, 2013, the Dan Ryan branch closed as part of the Red Line South Reconstruction Project which cost $425 million. With the branch being 44 years old, track conditions had been causing Red Line riders to experience longer travel times, overcrowded trains and a less reliable service. As part of the project, the Garfield, 63rd, and 87th stations were renovated and equipped with an elevator, making all Dan Ryan branch stations fully accessible for passengers with disabilities. During reconstruction, Red Line trains were rerouted on the South Side Elevated to Ashland/63rd while all Green Line trains were routed to Cottage Grove, with some evening rush hour trains terminating in the Loop. The newly reconstructed Dan Ryan branch and the nine stations reopened on October 20, 2013.

== Extension ==
The Red Line Extension is a rapid transit extension project that will extend the Red Line south from the 95th/Dan Ryan station to the future 130th station. Construction is scheduled to occur between 2026 and 2030, with the project costing $5.7 billion. The project began on April 24, 2026.

== Station listing ==
Station	Location
Cermak–Chinatown	138 W. Cermak Road
Sox–35th	142 W. 35th Street
47th	220 W. 47th Street
Garfield	220 W. Garfield Boulevard
63rd	220 W. 63rd Street
69th	15 W. 69th Street
79th	15 W. 79th Street
87th	15 W. 87th Street
95th/Dan Ryan	15 W. 95th Street
103rd	103rd Street and Eggleston Avenue
111th	111th Street near Stewart Avenue
Michigan	Michigan Avenue near 116th Street
130th	132nd Street near Doty Avenue

== Image gallery ==
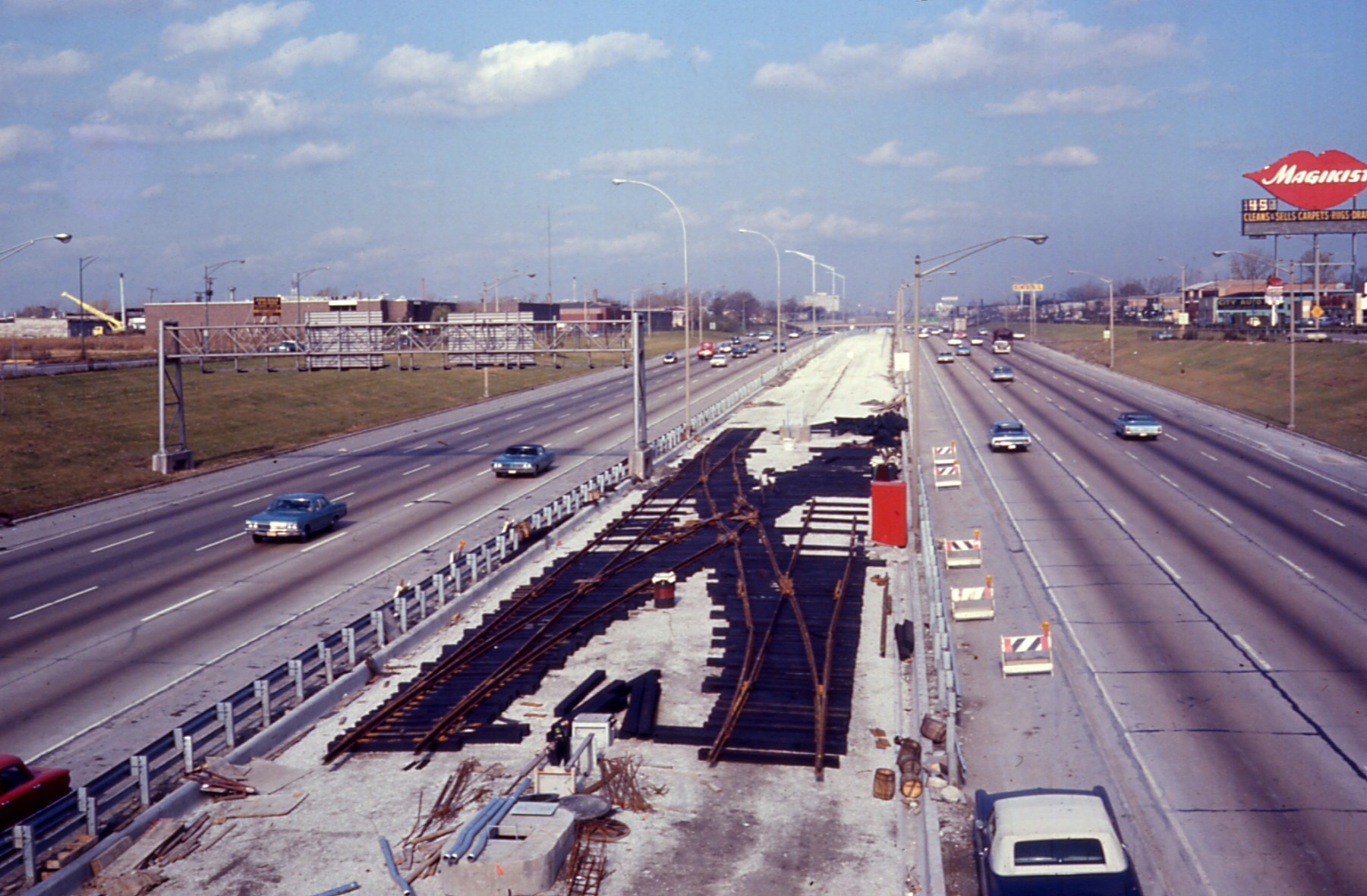
The Dan Ryan Branch undergoing construction, November 1968

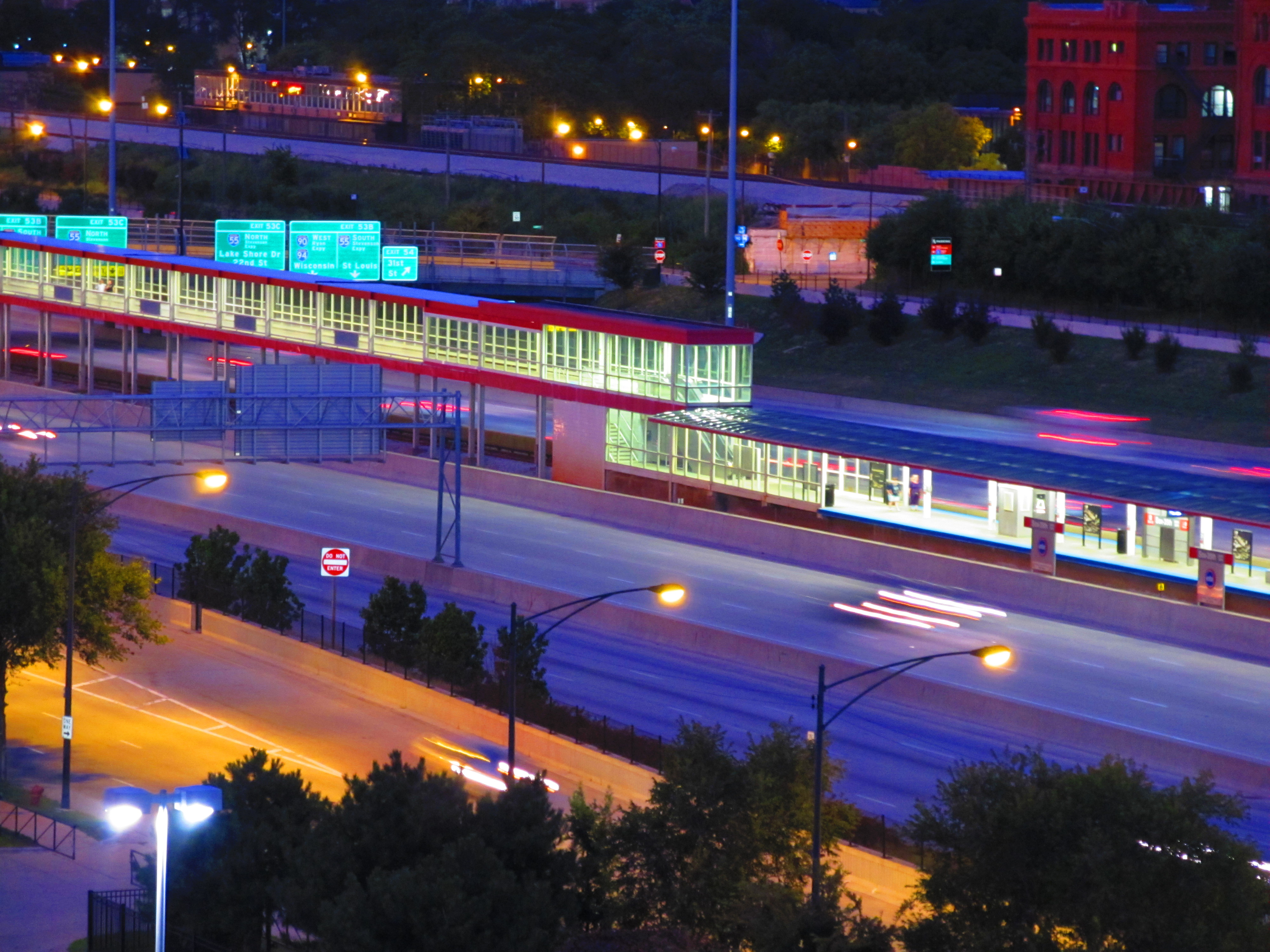
The Sox-35th station at night, August 2011

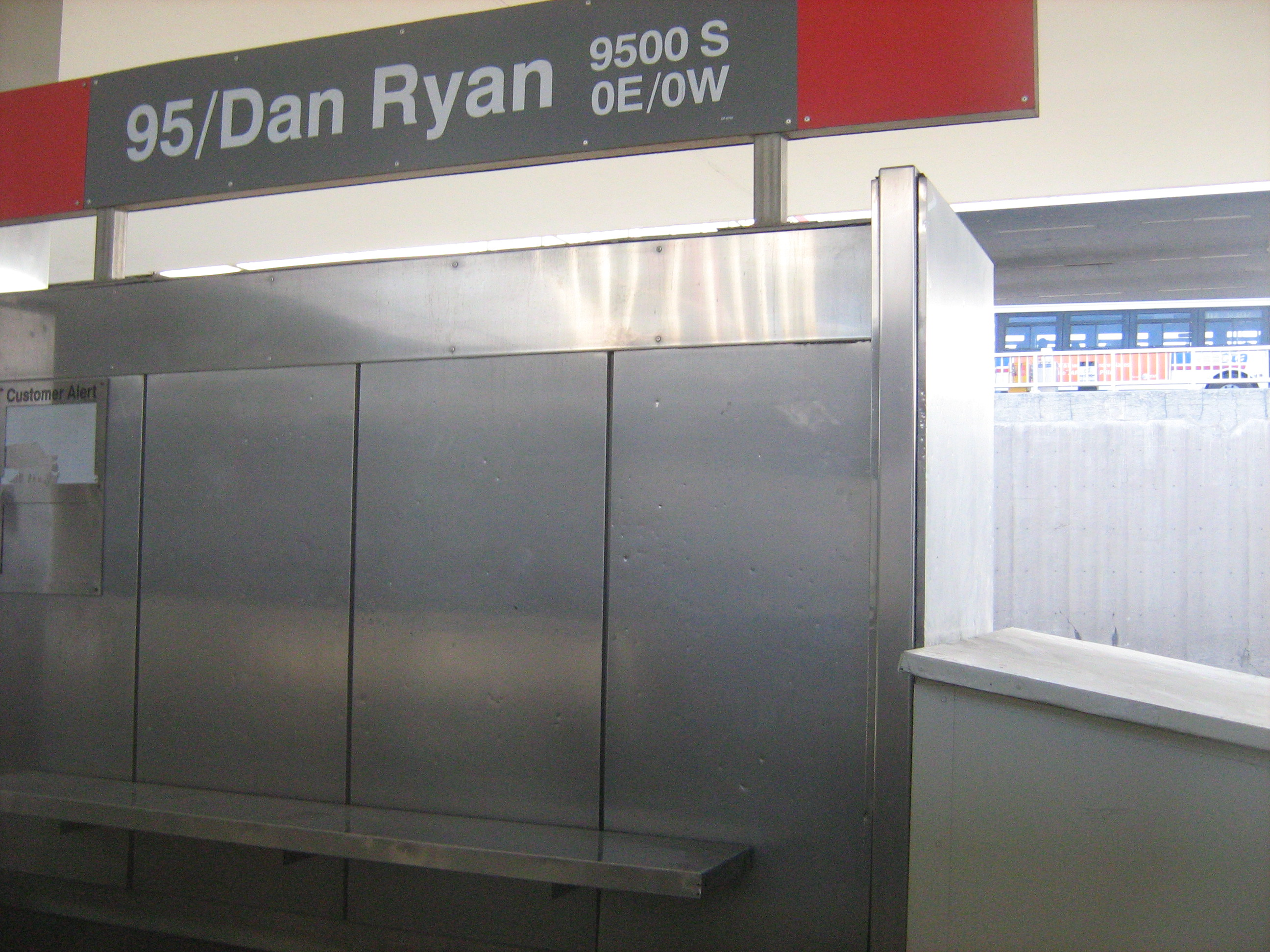
The 95th/Dan Ryan station is the southern terminus of the Red Line
