= Garfield Boulevard =

East-west street in Chicago, Illinois

Garfield Boulevard (55th Street)
- James A. Garfield Memorial Boulevard; 5500 South
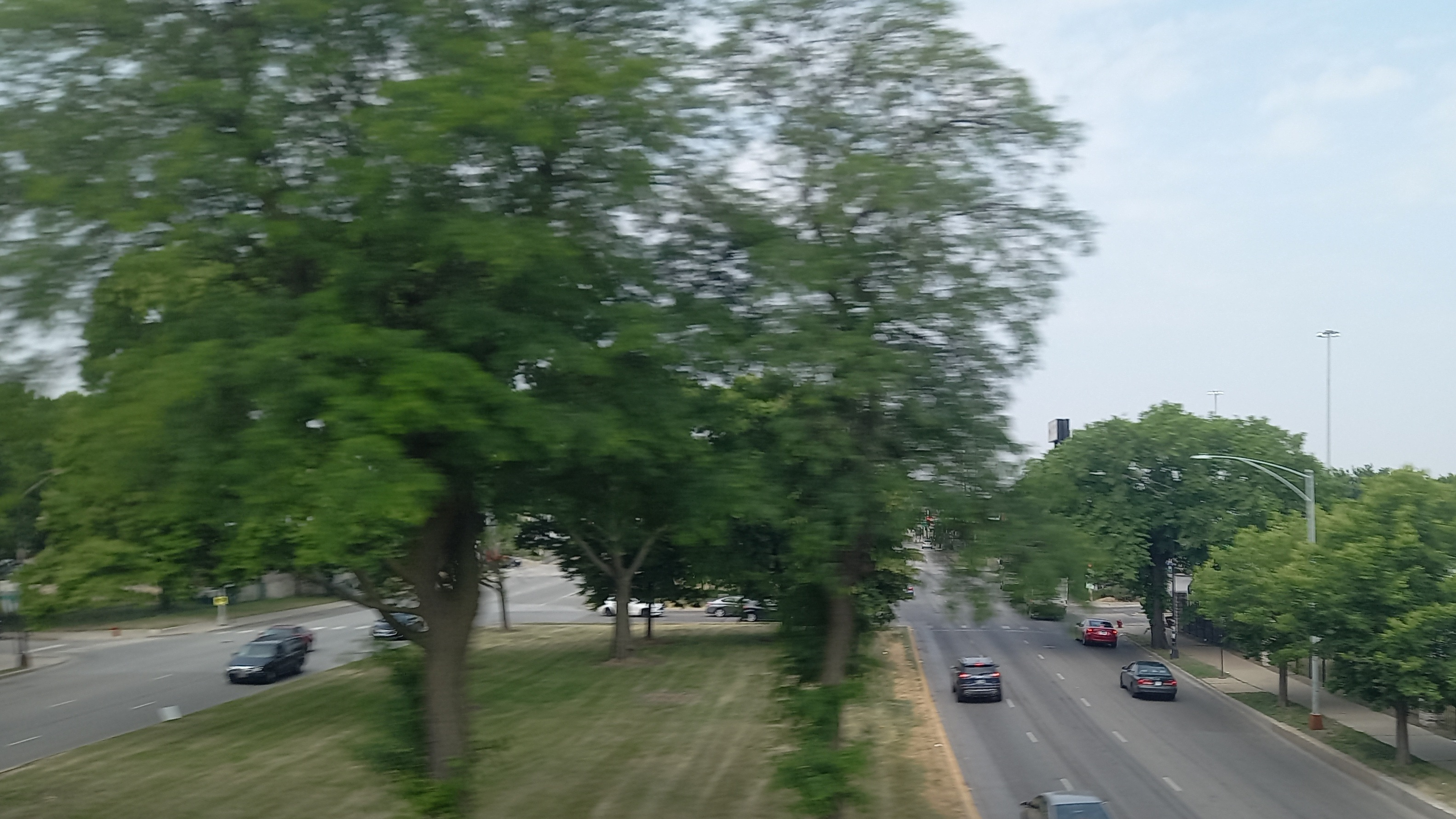
- Garfield Boulevard, looking west on Metra's Rock Island District line
- Part of: CR 35
- Length: 9.09 miles (14.63 km) (western segment); 10.29 miles (16.56 km) (eastern segment); 19.38 miles (31.19 km) (total)
- Location: Chicago
- West end: Maple Avenue in Downers Grove
- East end: South Shore Drive in Chicago

Other
- Known for: James A. Garfield

Garfield Boulevard is an east-west street on the south side of Chicago and its immediate western suburbs. Its western segment, entirely known as 55th Street, runs east from Maple Avenue in Downers Grove until it becomes Joliet Road in Countryside. Its eastern segment, known only as Garfield Boulevard from Western Avenue in Gage Park to Elsworth Drive in Washington Park, runs east from Archer Avenue and Narragansett Avenue to South Shore Drive, just west of U.S. Route 41 (Lake Shore Drive). All of the eastern segment of 55th Street lies within the city limits of Chicago.

== Route description ==
55th Street begins at Maple Avenue in Downers Grove. In Clarendon Hills, the street intersects Illinois Route 83 (Kingery Highway). As the road continues east into Hinsdale, 55th Street crosses from DuPage County to Cook County at County Line Road. Just east of the county line, the road passes over Interstate 294 (Tri-State Tollway). In Countryside, 55th Street intersects U.S. Route 12/U.S. Route 20/U.S. Route 45 (LaGrange Road). The western segment ends about one mile further east when the road becomes Joliet Road.

The two segments of 55th Street are split because Interstate 55 (Stevenson Expressway) runs in its path if it were to continue in either direction.

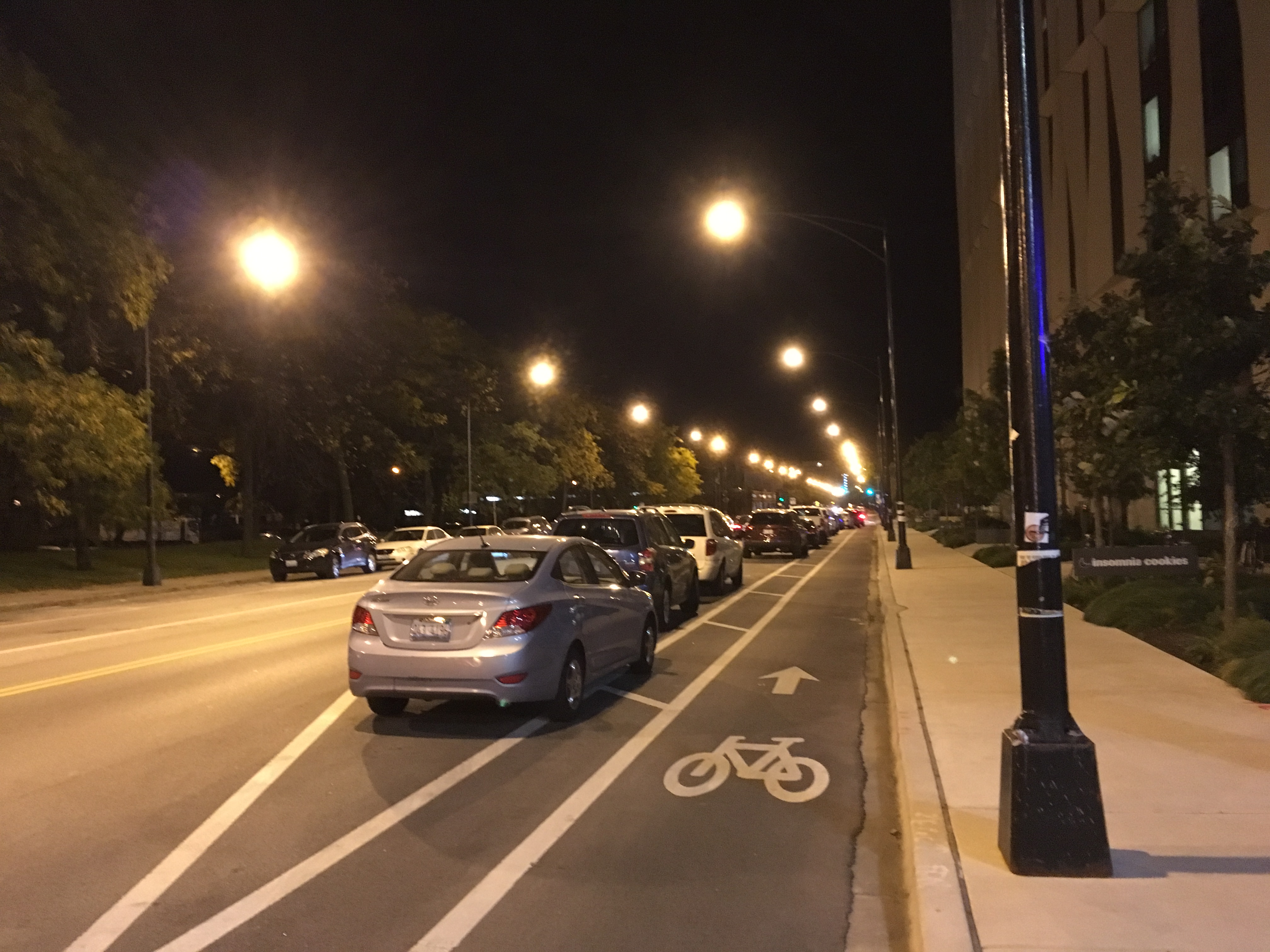
55th Street at the University of Chicago campus

55th Street resumes at Archer Avenue and Narragansett Avenue near the western city limits of Chicago. From Central Avenue to Illinois Route 50 (Cicero Avenue), 55th Street serves as the northern boundary for Midway Airport. The next three roads that intersect 55th Street are Pulaski Road, Kedzie Avenue, and Western Avenue. At Western Avenue, 55th Street officially becomes Garfield Boulevard. Garfield Boulevard continues east, intersecting Halsted Street. About three-fourths of a mile further east, Garfield Boulevard intersects Interstate 90/Interstate 94 (Dan Ryan Expressway). After this intersection, the road intersects State Street and Michigan Avenue.

At Elsworth Drive in Washington Park, Garfield Boulevard is redesignated as 55th Street, intersecting Cottage Grove Avenue shortly east of this point. From Cottage Grove Avenue to University Avenue, 55th Street forms the northern boundary of the University of Chicago campus. 55th Street finally intersects South Shore Drive, where the street continues east until a cul-de-sac just west of U.S. Route 41 (Lake Shore Drive).

== History ==
On September 21, 1881, the boulevard section of the street was renamed in honor of the twentieth president, James A. Garfield, two months after his assassination.

== Transportation ==
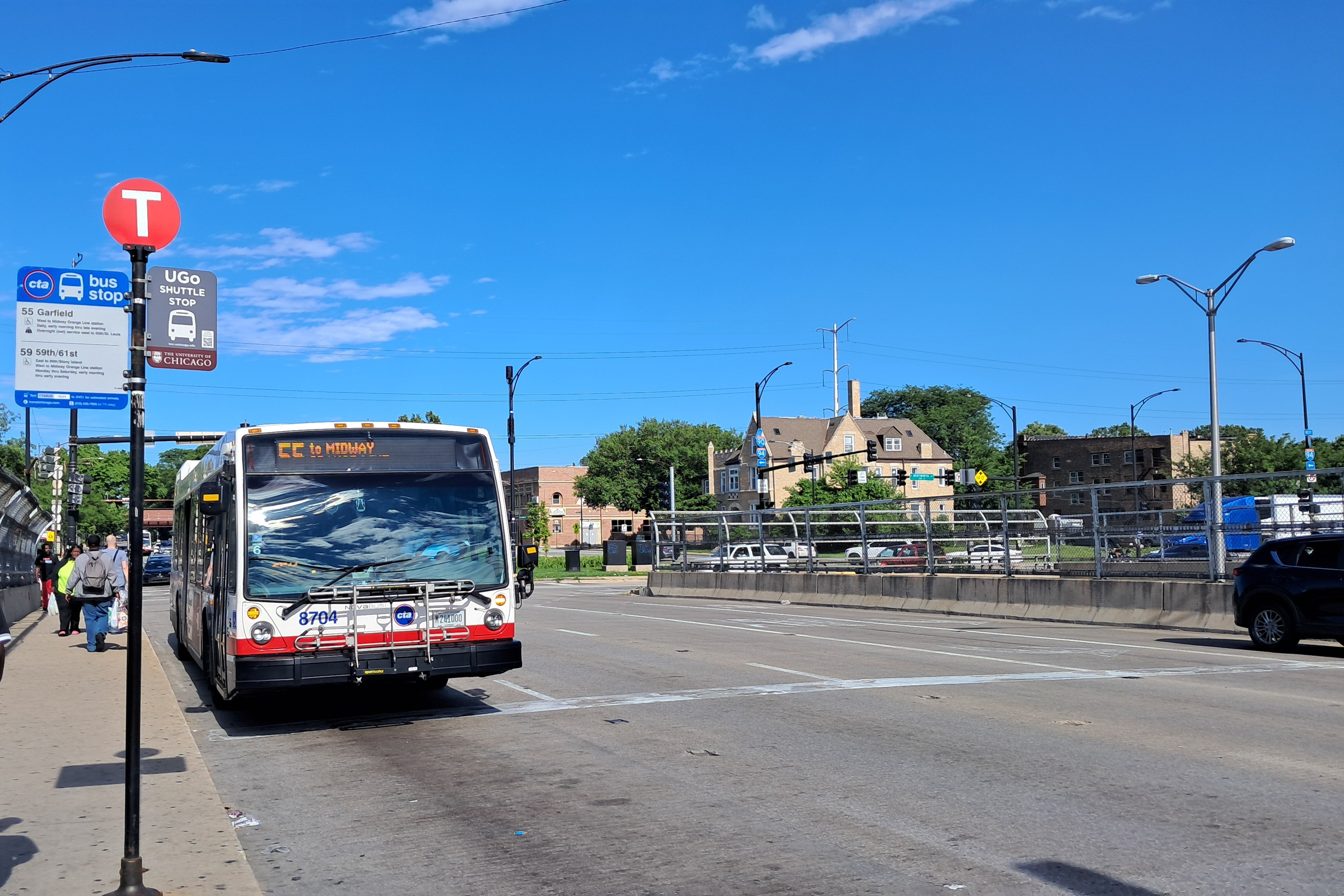
CTA route 55 bus at Garfield station (CTA Red Line)

As a major east-west road, 55th Street/Garfield Boulevard is served by multiple transportation hubs, including Midway International Airport, and corridors.

55 Garfield is a CTA bus route from Midway station at Midway Airport to the Museum of Science and Industry. 55A 55th/Austin and 55N 55th/Narragansett are two CTA bus routes that run west from Midway to Austin Avenue/65th Street and Narragansett/63rd Place, respectively. 330 Mannheim–LaGrange Roads, a Pace bus route, runs along 55th Street for a short distance.

The road is also served by the following rail services:

- Red Line at Garfield station
- Green Line at Garfield station
- Metra Electric District and South Shore Line at 55th/56th/57th Street station

== Major intersections ==
County	Location	mi	km	Destinations	Notes
DuPage	Downers Grove	0.0	0.0	CR 35 begins (Maple Avenue) / CR 17 ends (Dunham Road)	Western terminus
DuPage	Downers Grove	0.6	0.97	CR 9 south (Main Street)	
DuPage	Downers Grove	1.6	2.6	CR 25 south (Fairview Avenue)	
DuPage	Westmont	2.2	3.5	CR 15 south (Cass Avenue)	
DuPage	Clarendon Hills–Hinsdale line	3.7	6.0	IL 83 (Kingery Highway)	Interchange
DuPage	Hinsdale	4.2	6.8	CR 8 south (Madison Street)	
DuPage–Cook county line	Hinsdale	5.2	8.4	CR 35 ends / CR W19 south (County Line Road)	
Cook	Western Springs–La Grange Highlands line	6.2	10.0	CR W22 (Wolf Road)	
Cook	LaGrange–Countryside line	7.2	11.6	CR W76 south (Brainard Avenue)	
Cook	LaGrange–Countryside line	7.4	11.9	CR B37 (Plainfield Road)	
Cook	Countryside	7.7	12.4	US 12 / US 20 / US 45 (La Grange Road)	
Cook	McCook	9.09	14.63	Historic US 66 (Joliet Road)	
Cook	Gap in route				
Cook	Chicago	9.09	14.63	South Archer Avenue / South Narragansett Avenue	
Cook	Chicago	11.1	17.9	IL 50 (South Cicero Avenue)	Access to Midway Airport
Cook	Chicago	13.6	21.9	CR W94 north (California Avenue)	
Cook	Chicago	15.1	24.3	CR W48 (Ashland Avenue)	
Cook	Chicago	16.9	27.2	I-90 / I-94 (Dan Ryan Expressway)	
Cook	Chicago	19.38	31.19	South Shore Drive	Eastern terminus
1.000 mi = 1.609 km; 1.000 km = 0.621 mi
