= Fuller Park (Chicago park) =

- U.S. National Register of Historic Places
- U.S. Historic district
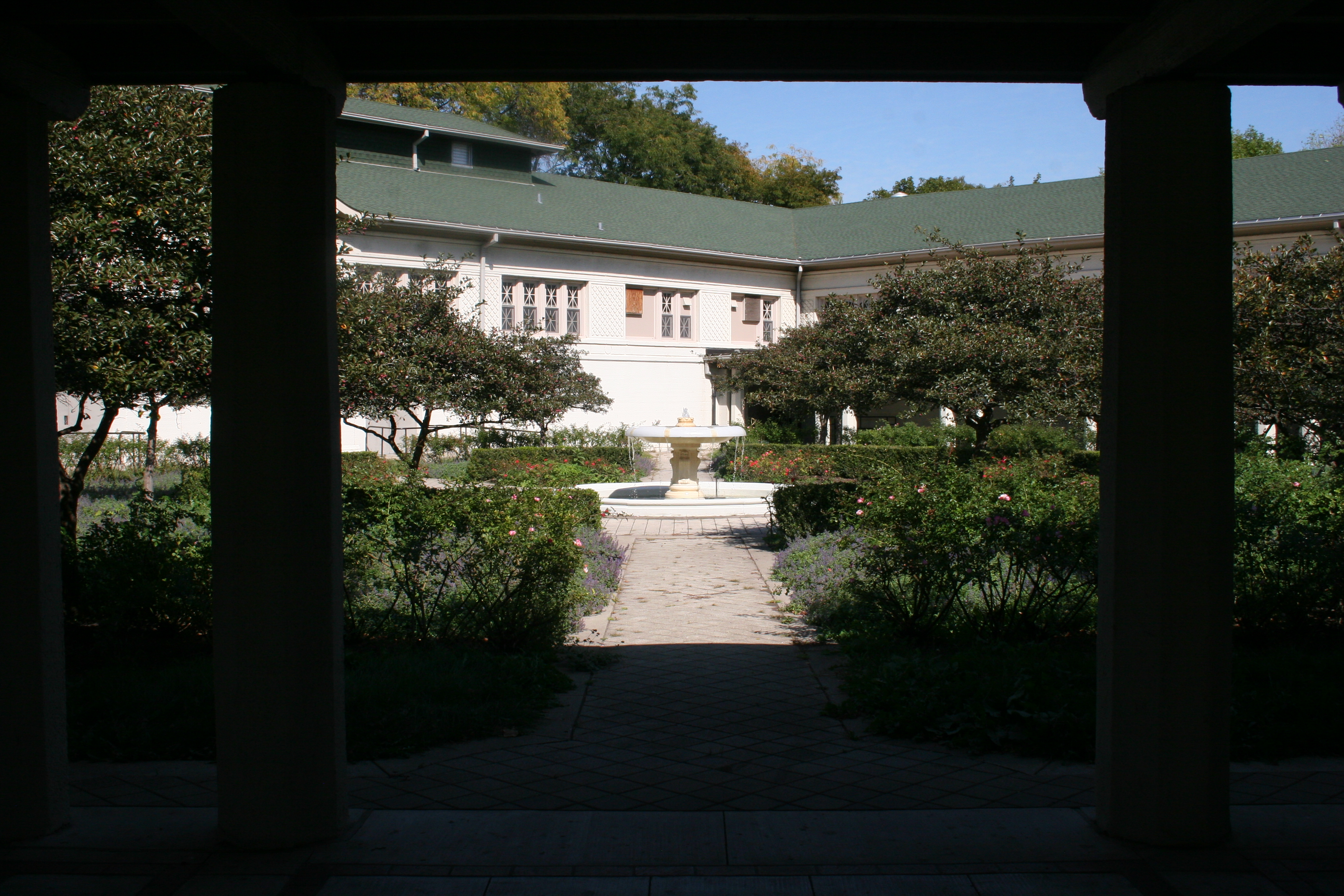

- Location within Chicago metropolitan area Location within Illinois Location within the United States
- Location: 331 W. 45th St., Chicago, Illinois
- Coordinates: 41°48′46″N 87°38′03″W
- Area: 10.5 acres (4.2 ha)
- Architect: Burnham, D.H. & Co.; South Park Commission
- Architectural style: Beaux Arts
- MPS: Chicago Park District MPS
- NRHP reference No.: 02001347
- Added to NRHP: November 20, 2002

Fuller Park is a public park at 331 W. 45th Street in the neighborhood of the same name in Chicago, Illinois, United States. The park was one of several built by the South Park Commission in the early 20th century to provide parks in dense and poor South Side Chicago neighborhoods which lacked them. While most of the South Park Commission parks opened in the mid-1900s, work on Fuller Park did not begin until 1910 due to a dispute over its location, and its facilities gradually opened over the next four years. The park was named for Melville Fuller, an Illinois native and former Chief Justice of the United States. The South Park Commission designed the park's landscape in a similar style to their earlier parks, which had been designed by the Olmsted Brothers; D. H. Burnham and Company designed its buildings, as they had for the earlier parks. The park originally included a Beaux-Arts fieldhouse, a gymnasium, a bathhouse, a grandstand, and a running track and walking paths. Fuller Park was first settled by Irish immigrants in the later 1860s after the Union Stock Yards opened on Christmas Day 1865. This area became a part of the Lake Township area and after the Great Chicago Fire of 1871 and the opening of the Lake Shore & Michigan Southern Railroad the area flourished into a community.

The park was added to the National Register of Historic Places on November 20, 2002.
