= 95th/Dan Ryan station =

Chicago "L" station

95th/Dan Ryan 9500S 0E/0W
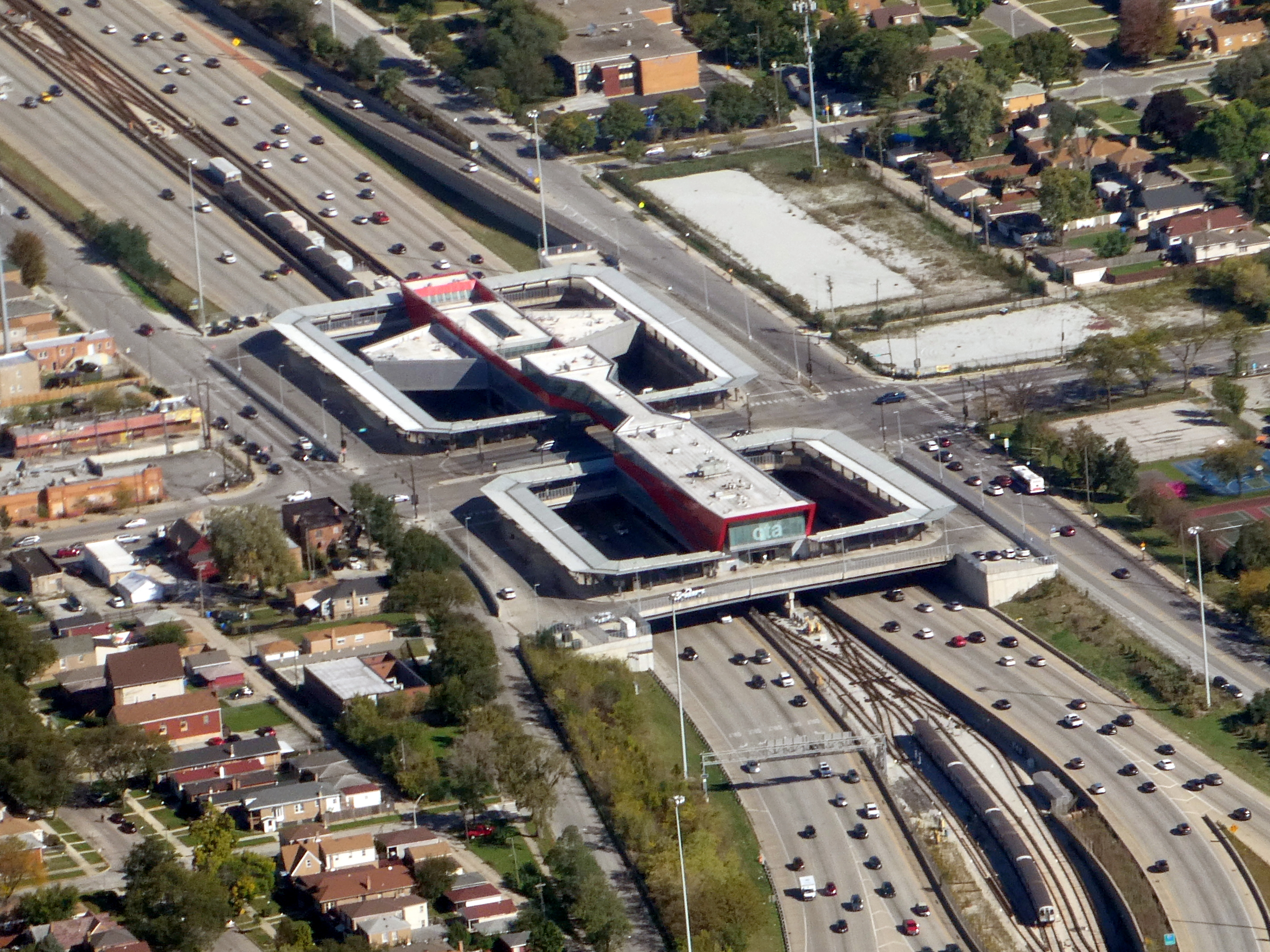
- Aerial view of the station in 2024

General information
- Location: 15 West 95th Street; Chicago, Illinois
- Coordinates: 41.722596°N 87.624391°W
- Owner: Chicago Transit Authority
- Line: Dan Ryan branch
- Platforms: 1 Island platform
- Tracks: 2
- Connections: CTA buses Pace buses Greyhound

Construction
- Structure type: Expressway median
- Parking: No
- Cycle facilities: Yes
- Accessible: Yes

History
- Opened: September 26, 1969; 57 years ago (formal opening); September 28, 1969; 57 years ago (full service)
- Rebuilt: 2000–01 (elevator added, minor renovations); 2003 (bus terminal renovations); 2014–19 (station reconstruction)
- Former names: 95th, 95th/State (station sign)

Passengers
- 2025: 1,805,685 ▲24.7%

Services
Preceding station	Chicago "L"	Following station
87th toward Howard	Red Line	Terminus
Future services
Preceding station	Chicago "L"	Following station
87th toward Howard	Red Line	103rd toward 130th
Preceding station	Pace Pulse	Following station
Halsted toward MVCC	95th Street Line	Terminus
95th toward Harvey	Halsted Line	Terminus
Track layout
Location

95th/Dan Ryan, announced as 95th, is an 'L' station in the median of the Dan Ryan Expressway and serving Chicago's Roseland neighborhood. The station serves as the southern terminus of the Chicago Transit Authority's Red Line. The station was the system's thirteenth busiest in 2021. It has a bus terminal served by CTA, Pace, and Greyhound buses. Over 1 million people used the terminal in 2021.

== History ==
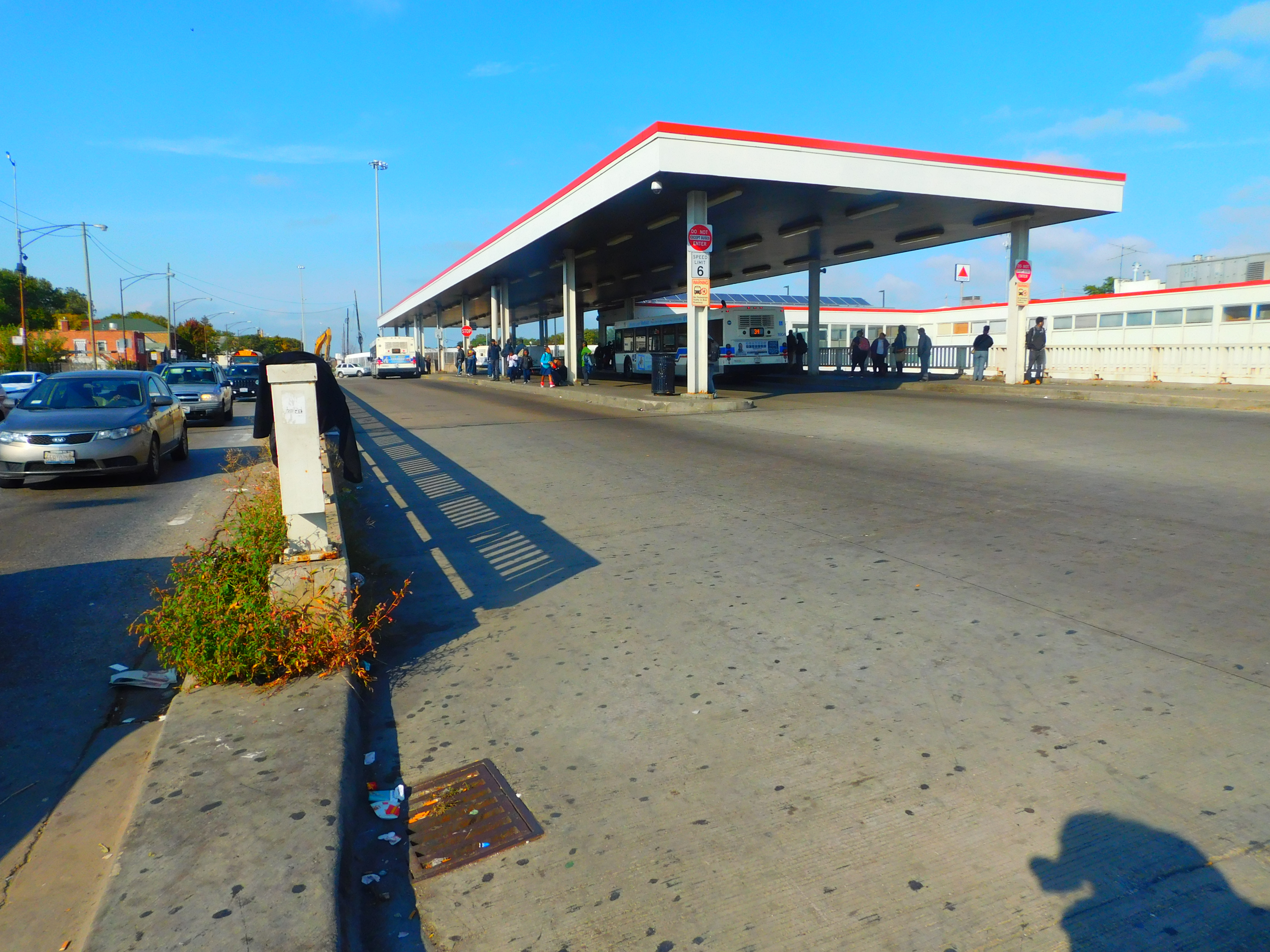
Bus station before reconstruction

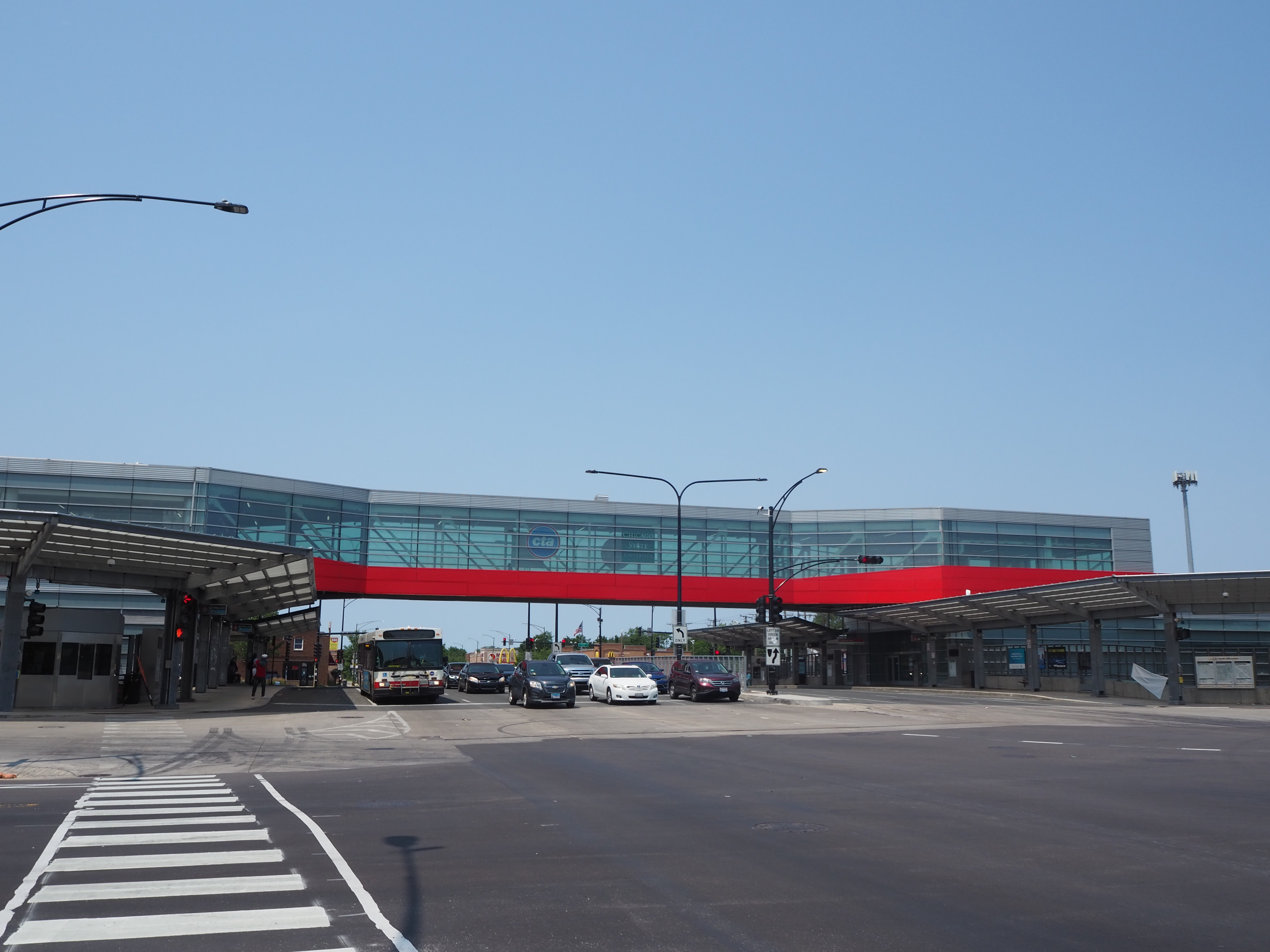
The station after reconstruction

The 95th/Dan Ryan station has undergone significant transformations since its opening on September 28, 1969, as part of the Dan Ryan branch. Initially, the station was simply known as 95th, but in the mid-1990s, its name was updated to 95/Dan Ryan, and later to 95th/Dan Ryan. Over the years, the station has undergone several renovations, including the addition of an elevator in 2000-01 and minor refurbishments. Further improvements were made in 2003 with the renovation of the bus terminal, and most recently, a major reconstruction project took place from 2014 to 2019, bringing the station up to modern standards.

After the Red Line South Reconstruction project was completed in October 2013, the CTA commenced a rebuild of the 95th/Dan Ryan terminal, at a cost of $240 million. The station remained open during the project, which began on September 22, 2014. The entire project was completed on April 27, 2019, with the reopening of the Red Line train platform under the South Terminal building, which became a walkway, the new and expanded terminal has a pedestrian bridge that connects the North and South Terminal buildings, four customer assistant booths, two on the outside of the station, one in the North Terminal and one in the South Terminal, six station entrances, four at the North Terminal and two at the South Terminal, additional escalators, elevators and stairs, additional turnstiles and Ventra card machines, additional bike racks, security cameras, and more bus boarding areas than the old station.

== Bus connections ==
CTA:

- 3 King Drive
- N4 Cottage Grove (Owl Service – overnight only)
- X4 Cottage Grove Express (weekday rush hours only)
- N5 South Shore Night Bus (Owl Service – overnight only)
- N9 Ashland (Owl Service – overnight only)
- 29 State
- 34 South Michigan (Owl Service)
- 95 95th
- 100 Jeffery Manor Express (weekday rush hours only)
- 103 West 103rd
- 106 East 103rd
- 108 Halsted/95th (weekday rush hours only)
- 111 111th/King Drive
- 112 Vincennes/111th
- 115 Pullman/115th
- 119 Michigan/119th

Pace:

- 352 Halsted (Owl Service)
- 353 95th/Dan Ryan CTA/Calumet City/Homewood
- 359 Robbins/South Kedzie Avenue
- 381 95th Street
- 395 95th/Dan Ryan CTA/UPS Hodgkins (weekday UPS shifts only)
