= Dan Ryan Expressway =

Highway in Illinois

- South Route Expressway

Route information
- Maintained by IDOT
- Length: 11.47 mi (18.46 km)
- Existed: 1961–present
- Component highways: I-90 from near Downtown Chicago to Englewood; I-94 entire length

Major junctions
- North end: I-90 / I-94 / I-290 / IL 110 (CKC) in Chicago
- I-55 in Chicago; I-90 Toll / Chicago Skyway in Chicago; US 12 / US 20 in Chicago
- South end: I-57 / I-94 in Chicago

Location
- Country: United States
- State: Illinois

Highway system
- Interstate Highway System; Main; Auxiliary; Suffixed; Business; Future; Illinois State Highway System; Interstate; US; State; Tollways; Scenic

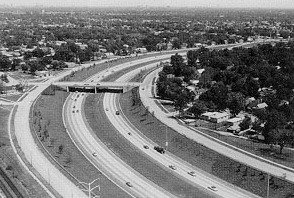
The Dan Ryan Expressway West Leg (now more commonly referred to as I-57) at Genoa Road in 1970

The Dan Ryan Expressway, often called "the Dan Ryan" by locals, is an expressway in Chicago that runs from the Jane Byrne Interchange with Interstate 290 (I-290) near downtown Chicago through the South Side of the city. It is designated as both I-90 and I-94 south to 66th Street, a distance of 7.44 miles (11.97 km). South of 66th Street, the expressway meets the Chicago Skyway, which travels southeast; the I-90 designation transfers over to the Skyway, while the Dan Ryan Expressway retains the I-94 designation and continues south for 4.03 miles (6.49 km), ending at an interchange with I-57. This is a total distance of 11.47 miles (18.5 km). The highway was named for Dan Ryan Jr., a former president of the Cook County Board of Commissioners.

== Route description ==
On an average day, up to 307,100 vehicles use a portion of the Dan Ryan (2005 data). The Dan Ryan, and its North Side counterpart the Kennedy Expressway, are the busiest roads in the entire state of Illinois. Utilizing an express-local system, the Dan Ryan has 14 lanes of traffic; seven in each direction, with four of those as express lanes and the other three providing access for exit and on-ramps. Because of its width, the Dan Ryan is very popular with commuters who live south of the Loop, making the road prone to traffic jams during weekday rush hour.

The posted directions on the Dan Ryan are different from the actual compass direction of the expressway, which may cause confusion to many travelers. The Dan Ryan for its entire 12-mile (19 km) length runs north–south. However, the Dan Ryan is a part of the larger Interstates 90 and 94, which both run east–west through the United States. Therefore, one who is traveling "west" on I-90/94 is actually driving north on the Dan Ryan as it passes through Chicago; I-90 continues northwest from the Kennedy split, while I-94 runs north–south until the Marquette Interchange in Milwaukee. Similarly, "east" on 90 and 94 on the entire system is really south through Chicago; the interstates will continue on an easterly path outside of the city. Chicagoans also typically refer to the direction of travel as either "inbound" or "outbound" from the downtown area.

Four miles of continuous high-rise housing projects (Stateway Gardens and the Robert Taylor Homes) formerly ran parallel to the expressway on its eastern side from Cermak Road south to Garfield Boulevard. However, nearly all of these buildings have been demolished as part of the CHA's transformation plan.

The Red Line runs in the median of the Dan Ryan south of 27th Street. This section of the Chicago "L" opened on September 28, 1969. Chicago pioneered the location of rapid transit line in expressway medians, a practice that has since been followed in several other cities, such as Toronto, and Pasadena.

The control cities for the Dan Ryan Expressway are Indiana south, and the Chicago Loop northbound.

== History ==
The first segment of the Dan Ryan, opened on December 12, 1961, and ran between US 12/US 20, 95th Street north to 71st Street in Chicago's Grand Crossing neighborhood. It was named after the recently deceased Dan Ryan, Jr., who was President of the Cook County Board of Commissioners who had worked to accelerate construction of Chicago-area expressways. A year later on December 15, 1962, the 8-mile (13 km) stretch of the Dan Ryan between 71st Street and I-90/Eisenhower Expressway (now signed as I-290) opened to the public as well as a 0.2-mile (0.32 km) stretch that connected it to the Bishop Ford Freeway (then known as the Calumet Expressway). During the planning stages it was also known as the South Route Expressway.

In 1973 an elevated segment sank and was closed to traffic in May. A similar sinking occurred in 1966, according to Chicago Tribune archives.

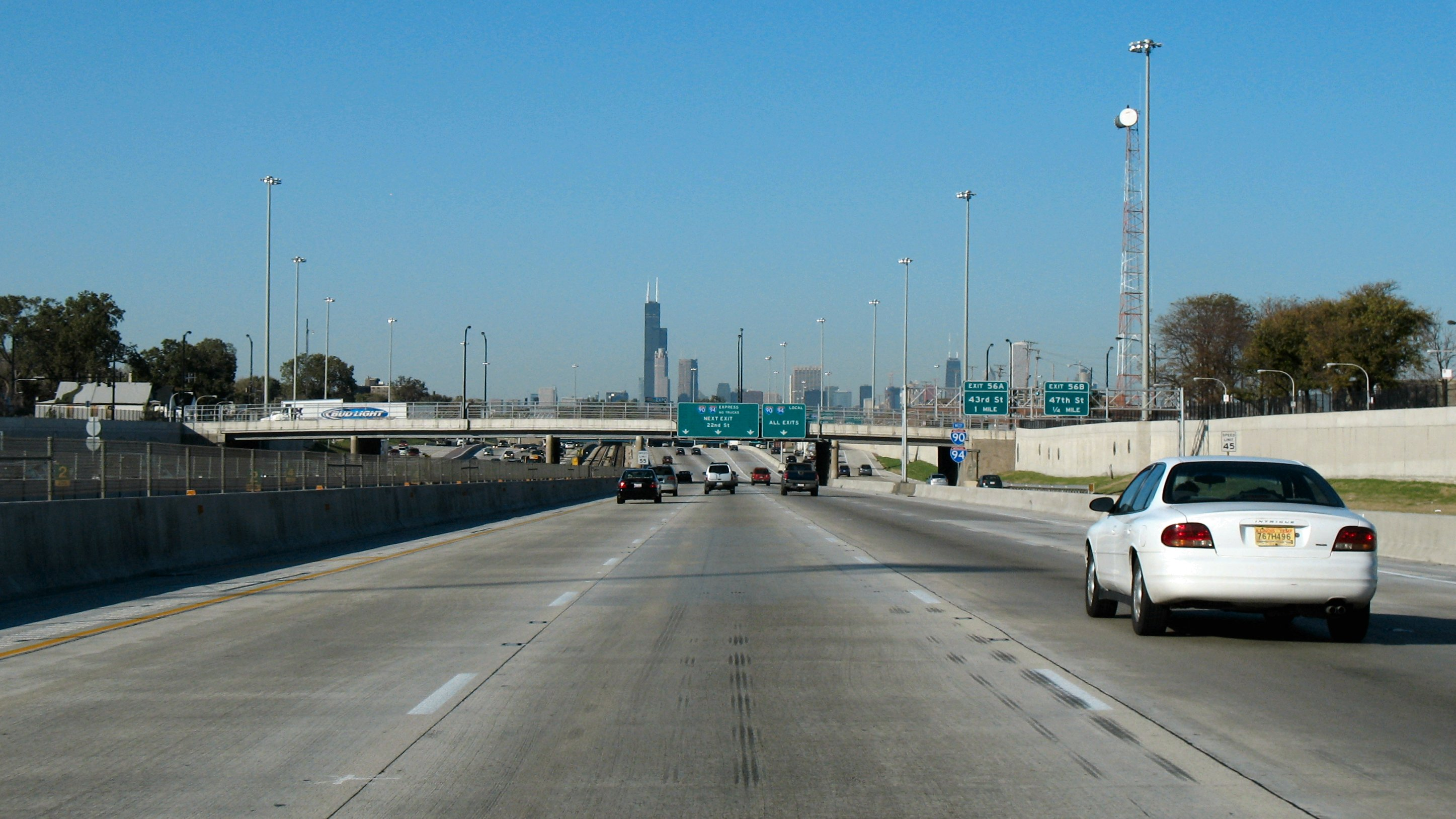
Northbound Dan Ryan Expressway near 51st Street

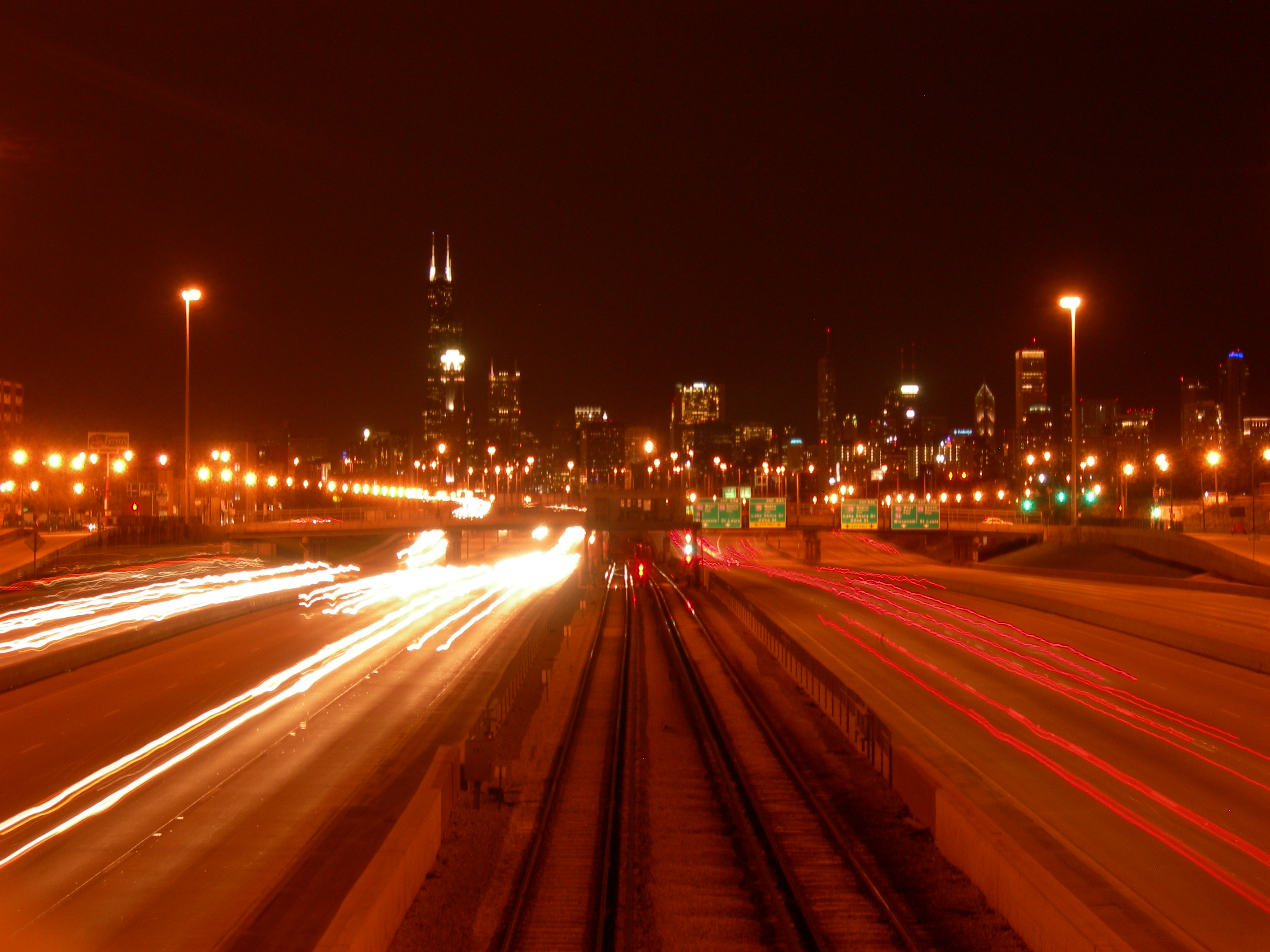
Expressway at night

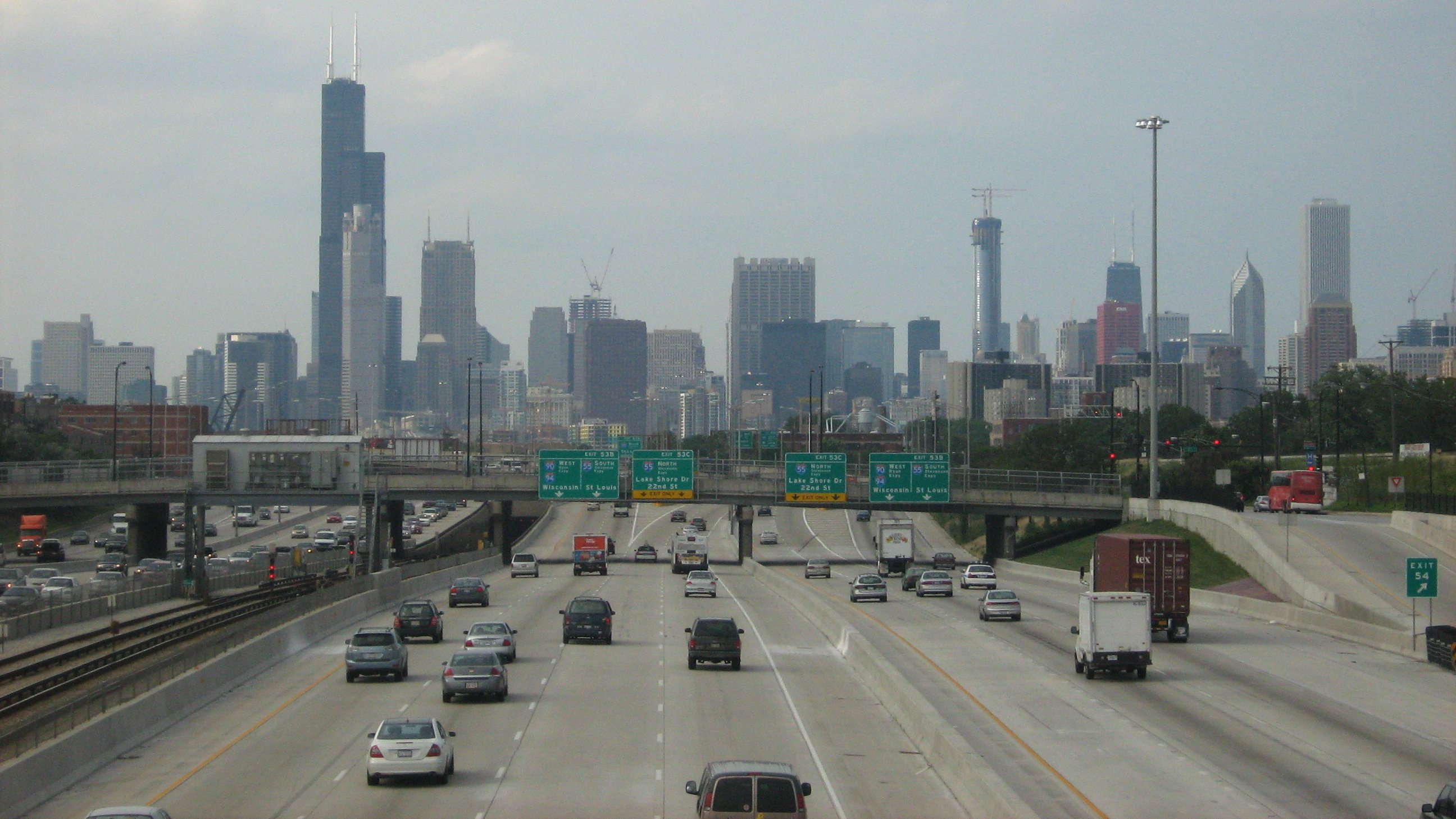
View in 2008 looking north towards the Chicago Loop from the Dan Ryan Expressway. 'L' tracks can be seen in the median.

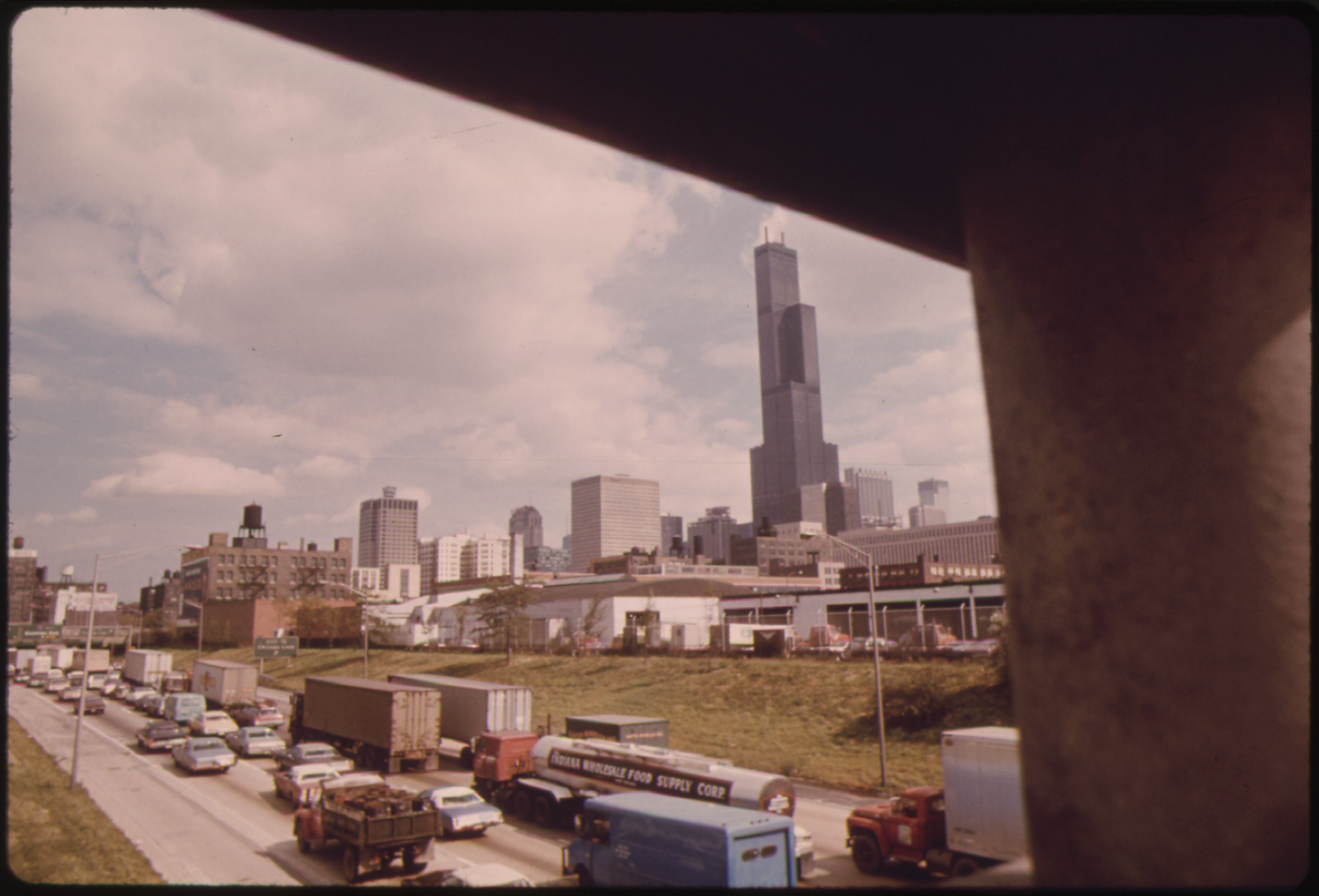
Heavy traffic in 1973

In 1988–1989, the northern three miles (4.8 km) of the Dan Ryan, known as the Elevated Bridge, were completely reconstructed.

In 2006 and 2007, the Illinois Department of Transportation reconstructed the entire length of the Dan Ryan Expressway, including the addition of a travel lane from 47th Street to 95th Street. The project was the largest expressway reconstruction plan in Chicago history. The total cost of the project was $975 million, nearly twice the $550 million original estimate for the project.

== Exit list ==
The entire route is in Chicago, Cook County.

mi	km	Exit	Destinations	Notes
			I-90 west / I-94 west (Kennedy Expressway) – Wisconsin	Continuation beyond I-290
51.8	83.4	51H	I-290 west (Eisenhower Expressway) – West Suburbs	No exit number westbound
51.8	83.4	51I	Ida B. Wells Drive (500 South)	Signed as 51H eastbound
52.1	83.8	52A	Taylor Street (1000 South), Roosevelt Road (1200 South)	Eastbound exit and westbound entrance
52.3	84.2	52B	Roosevelt Road (1200 South), Taylor Street (1000 South)	Westbound exit and eastbound entrance
52.9	85.1	52C	18th Street	Eastbound exit and westbound entrance
53.0	85.3	53A	Canalport Avenue, Cermak Road (2200 South)	Westbound exit and eastbound entrance
53.3	85.8	53	I-55 (Stevenson Expressway) – St. Louis, Lake Shore Drive	Signed as exits 53B (south) and 53C (north) westbound
		Western end of express lanes		
53.8	86.6	53C	Cermak Road (2200 South)	Westbound exit and eastbound entrance
54.7	88.0	54	31st Street (3100 South)	
55.2	88.8	55A	35th Street	Rate Field, Illinois Institute of Technology
55.7	89.6	55B	Pershing Road (3900 South)	
56.2	90.4	56A	43rd Street	
56.7	91.2	56B	47th Street (4700 South)	
57.7	92.9	57	Garfield Boulevard (5500 South)	Access to Midway Airport
58.2	93.7	58A	59th Street	Westbound exit and eastbound entrance; signed as exit 58 westbound
58.7	94.5	58B	63rd Street (6300 South)	Eastbound exit and westbound entrance; signed as exit 58 eastbound
59.0	95.0	59A	I-90 Toll east / Chicago Skyway east to Indiana Toll Road	Eastern end of I-90 concurrency; eastbound exit and westbound entrance
59.3	95.4	59B	Marquette Road, 67th Street (6700 South)	Westbound exit and eastbound entrance
		Eastern end of express lanes		
59.8	96.2	59C	71st Street (7100 South)	
60.3	97.0	60A	75th Street	Eastbound exit and westbound entrance
60.4	97.2	60B	76th Street	Westbound exit and eastbound entrance
60.8	97.8	60C	79th Street (7900 South)	
61.3	98.7	61A	83rd Street	Eastbound exit and westbound entrance
61.8	99.5	61B	87th Street (8700 South)	
62.8	101.1	62	US 12 / US 20 (95th Street)	Eastbound exit and westbound entrance
63.17	101.66	63	I-57 south – Memphis	Eastbound exit and westbound entrance
63.17	101.66	—	I-94 east (Bishop Ford Freeway) – Indiana	Eastbound exit and westbound entrance
1.000 mi = 1.609 km; 1.000 km = 0.621 mi: Concurrency terminus; Incomplete access
