= Lake Street Transfer station =

Rapid transit station in Chicago (1913–1951)

LAKE ST. TRANSFER 1700W 200N
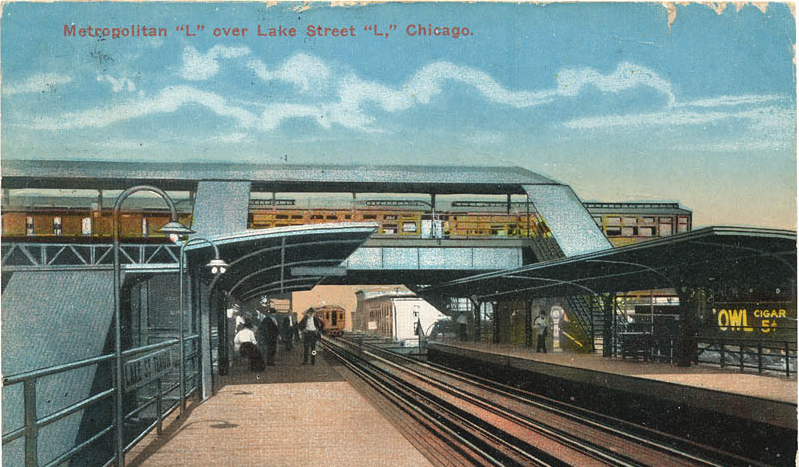
- The Lake Street Transfer. The Metropolitan is on top, the Lake Street Elevated on bottom.

General information
- Location: 1719 West Lake Street; Chicago, Illinois, US
- Coordinates: 41.8852°N 87.6701°W
- Owner: Chicago Transit Authority (1947–1951); Chicago Rapid Transit Company (1924–1947); See text before 1924
- Lines: Lake Street Elevated; Logan Square Branch
- Platforms: 4 side platforms
- Tracks: 4

Construction
- Structure type: Elevated
- Platform levels: 2

History
- Opened: November 6, 1893; 133 years ago (Wood); May 6, 1895; 131 years ago (Lake); November 3, 1913; 113 years ago (Transfer)
- Closed: February 25, 1951; 75 years ago
- Electrified: May 9, 1896 (Lake Street Elevated); May 6, 1895 (Logan Square branch)
- Former names: Wood (Lake Street Elevated); Lake (Logan Square branch)

Passengers
- 1948: 361,934 ▲69.48%
- Rank: 122 out of 223

Former services
Preceding station	Chicago "L"	Following station
Damen Closed 1948 (Note: California after 1948) toward Forest Park	Lake Street Elevated	Ashland Closed 1948 (Note: Loomis after 1948; Ashland reopened on February 25, 1951, upon the Lake Street Transfer's closure.) toward Loop (Randolph/Wells) or Market Terminal
Grand toward Logan Square	Logan Square branch	Madison toward Marshfield
Track layout
- This diagram does not include a junction from the Lake Street Elevated to the Paulina Connector as it was not built at the time of the closure.
Location

The Lake Street Transfer station was a rapid transit station on the Chicago "L", serving as a transfer station between its Lake Street Elevated Railroad and the Logan Square branch of its Metropolitan West Side Elevated Railroad. Located where the Logan Square branch crossed over the Lake Street Elevated, it was in service from 1913 to 1951, when it was rendered obsolete by the opening of the Dearborn Street subway.

The transfer station was an amalgamation of two predecessor stations: Wood, on the Lake Street Elevated, was on Wood Street, one block west of the site of the future transfer station, and had been constructed in 1893; the Metropolitan's Lake station, on the other hand, was on the site of the future transfer and had been built in 1895. These stations, and their lines, had been constructed by two different companies; when they and two more companies building what would become the "L" merged operations in the early 1910s, a condition for the merger was the construction of a transfer station between the Metropolitan and Lake Street Elevateds at their crossing, which in practice meant the replacement of Wood station with a new Lake Street one under the Metropolitan. Having already merged operations, the "L" companies formally united under the Chicago Rapid Transit Company (CRT) in 1924; the "L" became publicly owned when the Chicago Transit Authority (CTA) assumed operations in 1947.

Plans for a subway to provide a more direct route from Logan Square to downtown dated to the late 1930s, but the subway was originally intended to supplement the Logan Square branch of the area, on which the Metropolitan's station lay, rather than replace it. The newly formed CTA, however, found little reason to continue operation of the old Logan Square elevated. The subway was completed in 1951, leading to the station's closure, but remnants of the station survived into the 1960s. The site of the station is near the junction of the Paulina Connector – the descendant of the old Logan Square trackage – and the Lake Street Elevated, which was used for temporary and non-revenue service until the Pink Line opened in 2006 and returned it to revenue status.

Lake Street Transfer was double-decked, the Metropolitan's tracks and station located immediately above the Lake Street's tracks and station. Access to the eastbound Lake Street platform was by a station house at the street level; passengers would then use the platform to access the Metropolitan's platforms and Lake Street's westbound platform by additional stairways.

== History ==
=== Wood station (Lake Street Elevated; 1893–1913) ===
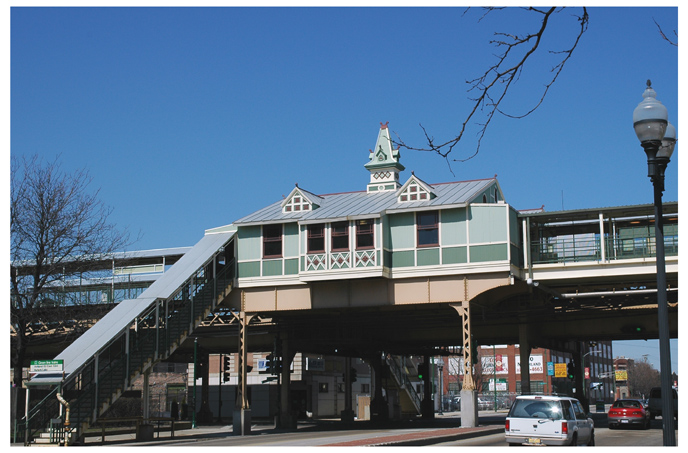
One of Ashland's station houses in 2005. Wood was of a similar design, but would have had staircases on both sides of the station house.

The Lake Street Elevated Railway Company was incorporated on February 7, 1888. Reincorporated as the Lake Street Elevated Railroad Company on August 24, 1892, to avoid legal issues, its line, the Lake Street Elevated, commenced revenue operations at 5:00 a.m. on November 6, 1893, between California station and the Market Street Terminal. The new line had 13 stations, (Note: Including one at Homan, west of California, which had been a part of a non-revenue grand opening on November 4 but would not open for revenue service until November 24.) one of which was located on Wood Street. The Elevated was powered by steam locomotives until May 9, 1896, when its tracks were electrified. The Lake Street Elevated Railroad, having been dogged by financial issues since its inception, was reorganized as the Chicago and Oak Park Elevated Railroad (C&OP) on March 31, 1904.

=== Lake station (Metropolitan Elevated; 1895–1913) ===
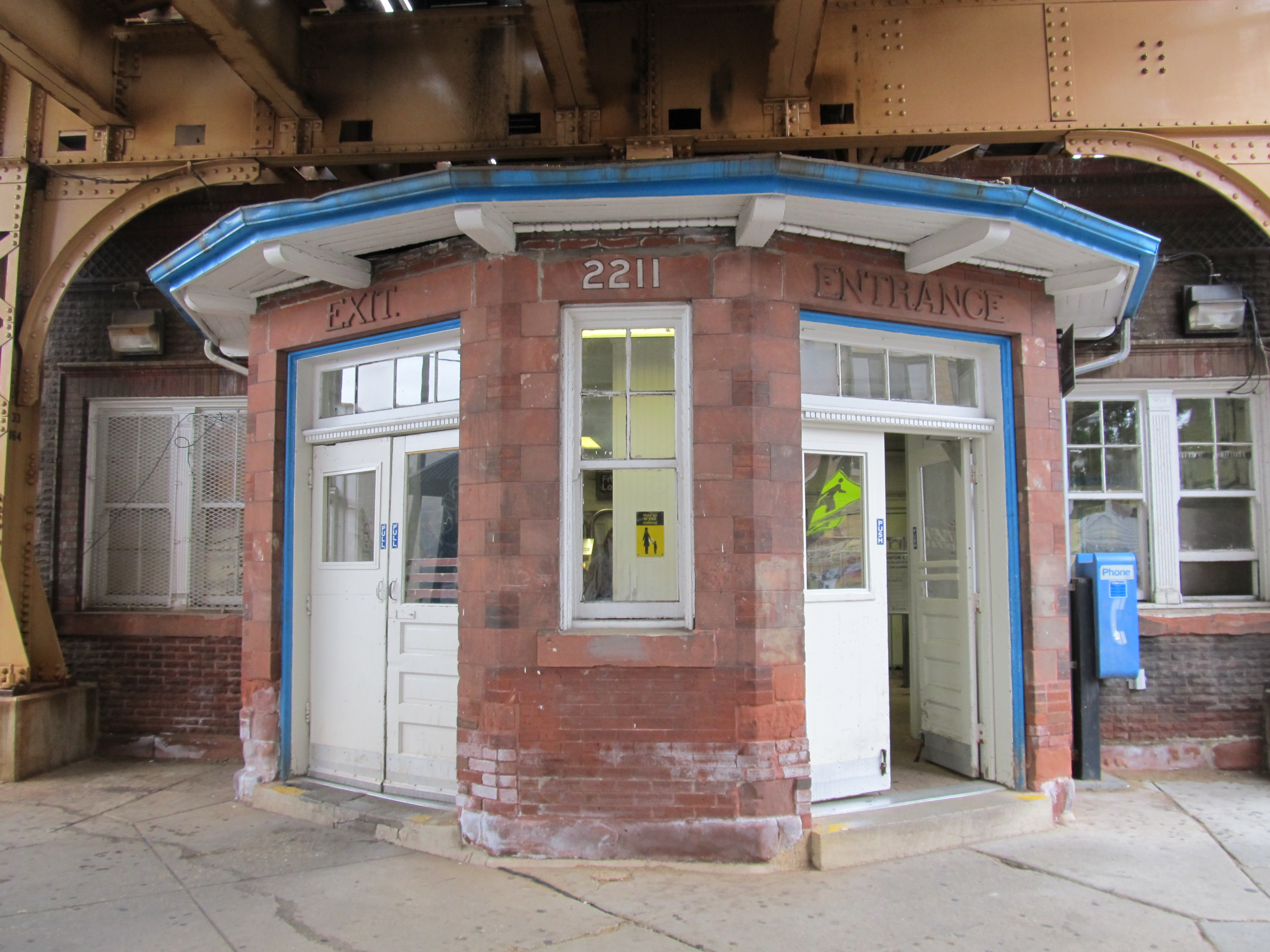
The station house at California in 2011; the original Metropolitan station house was of a similar design.

The Metropolitan West Side Elevated Railroad Company, another founding company of the Chicago "L", was granted a fifty-year franchise by the Chicago City Council on April 7, 1892. Unlike the Lake Street Elevated, which operated a single line, the Metropolitan had a main line that proceeded west from downtown to Marshfield Junction, where it split into three branches: one northwestern branch to Logan Square (which in turn had a branch to Humboldt Park (Note: Technically, the Logan Square branch started after Robey and was, like the Humboldt Park branch, a divergence from what was formally known as the "Northwest branch". However, as early as 1898, even the Metropolitan itself was referring to the Northwest branch as part of the "Logan Square branch", although ridership statistics continued to separate them.)), one branch due west to Garfield Park, and one southwestern branch to Douglas Park. While the competing South Side and Lake Street Elevateds used steam traction, the Metropolitan never did; although it had originally intended to, and indeed had built much of its structure under the assumption that locomotives would be used, it decided in May 1894 to have electrified tracks instead, making it upon its opening the first revenue electric elevated railroad in the United States.

The Metropolitan's tracks on the Logan Square branch were finished up to Robey by the middle of October 1894, and were given power in April 1895 for test and inspection runs. The Metropolitan began service at 6:00 a.m. on Monday, May 6, 1895, between Robey on the Logan Square branch and Canal on the main line. Eleven stations opened that day, one of which was on Lake Street. Since the Lake station crossed the Lake Street Elevated, its tracks and platforms were much higher than elsewhere on the "L".

=== Transfer station (1913–1951) ===
The Lake Street Transfer station in context. The station itself is marked by a blue marker. The Lake Street Elevated The Metropolitan's trackage prior to 1951 The Loop The Milwaukee–Dearborn subway and Congress Line

In 1911 the four companies operating the "L" – the C&OP and Metropolitan, as well as the South Side and Northwestern Elevated Railroads – merged operations under the aegis of Chicago Elevated Railways (CER) while keeping their separate identities. CER instituted full integration of crosstown service on the "L" and free transfers between the lines in 1913, having been mandated to do so by the City Council. As part of the same ordinance, the Metropolitan and C&OP were required to construct a transfer station where their tracks intersected; since the Metropolitan already had its Lake station on the site, this meant in practice that the C&OP had to build a station to connect with it. In the process of constructing the new transfer, the C&OP closed its nearby Wood station. Free transfers commenced on November 3, 1913, but the C&OP's new station was not finished at that point. As an interim measure, "walking" transfers between Wood station and the Metropolitan's Lake station were issued. After a few weeks, the C&OP's station was complete, and the Wood station was closed. Throughout the transfer station's existence, it was used as a point of transfer for passengers of one of the lines to switch to the other when construction or maintenance work rendered a line unable to go downtown. (Note: Examples of this occurring include incidents in February 1916 and on December 8, 1935.)

CER acted as a de facto holding company for the "L" – unifying its operations and instituting the same management across the companies – but kept the underlying companies intact. This continued until the companies were formally merged into the single Chicago Rapid Transit Company (CRT) in 1924, which assumed operations on January 9; the former C&OP and Metropolitan were designated as the respective Lake Street and Metropolitan Divisions of the CRT for administrative purposes. Although municipal ownership of transit had been a hotly-contested issue for half a century, the publicly-owned Chicago Transit Authority (CTA) would not be created until 1945, and would not assume operation of the "L" until October 1, 1947.

The new CTA began experiments to streamline service on the "L"; among them was skip-stop, which began as an experiment on the Lake Street Elevated on April 5, 1948. Stations in between Pulaski and the Loop, exclusive, became either "A" or "B" stations and were serviced by respective "A" or "B" trains during weekdays. Despite being located in this area, Lake Street Transfer was exempt from this system and continued to be serviced by all Lake Street Elevated trains. As part of the same plan to streamline Lake Street service, the Ashland station one block east of the transfer was closed but remained standing. The Logan Square branch would not begin skip-stop until the opening of the Dearborn Street subway and the closing of the transfer in 1951.

=== Dearborn Street subway, closure, and demolition ===
Plans for Chicago to have a subway system to relieve the severe congestion of, if not replace, its elevated trackage dated back to the early 20th century, but the city lagged in building subways. Chicago petitioned the Public Works Administration (PWA) for construction funds for a subway on State Street in 1937. The petition originally included a proposal for two downtown east-west streetcar tunnels. Harold L. Ickes, the administrator of the PWA and a longtime Chicagoan, vetoed the streetcar tunnel plan and insisted instead on a second subway that would go under Dearborn Street and Milwaukee Avenue, which would provide a more direct route from Logan Square to downtown. Although this idea engendered considerable local opposition, especially from mayor Edward Joseph Kelly, Ickes's influence in the federal government led to the Dearborn plan being adopted in 1938. A 1939 plan also introduced the idea of replacing the Metropolitan's main line and Garfield Park branch with a section of rapid transit operating through a proposed superhighway on Congress Street (the eventual I‑290). These sections of transit would be connected, allowing for the area's rapid transit to be routed through downtown rather than adhere to a trunk-and-branch model.

The subway's approval did not immediately imply the end of the old Logan Square branch; plans in 1939 included another proposed subway to connect the branch with the Ravenswood branch to the north and through-routing it with the Douglas Park branch to the south into a subway on Ashland Avenue to form a crosstown route. Damen Tower serving the Humboldt Park branch divergence was rebuilt with the expectation that it also would switch trains between the subway and the elevated, much like the State Street subway connects with the earlier elevated North Side main line that remained standing after its construction, and as late as 1949 commuters were promised such a setup that would have preserved the old Logan Square trackage. However, the CTA had no interest in operating either the old Logan Square elevated or the Humboldt Park branch; the new Damen Tower would never be installed with switching equipment, and the Logan Square branch south of Damen would be closed after the Dearborn subway opened.

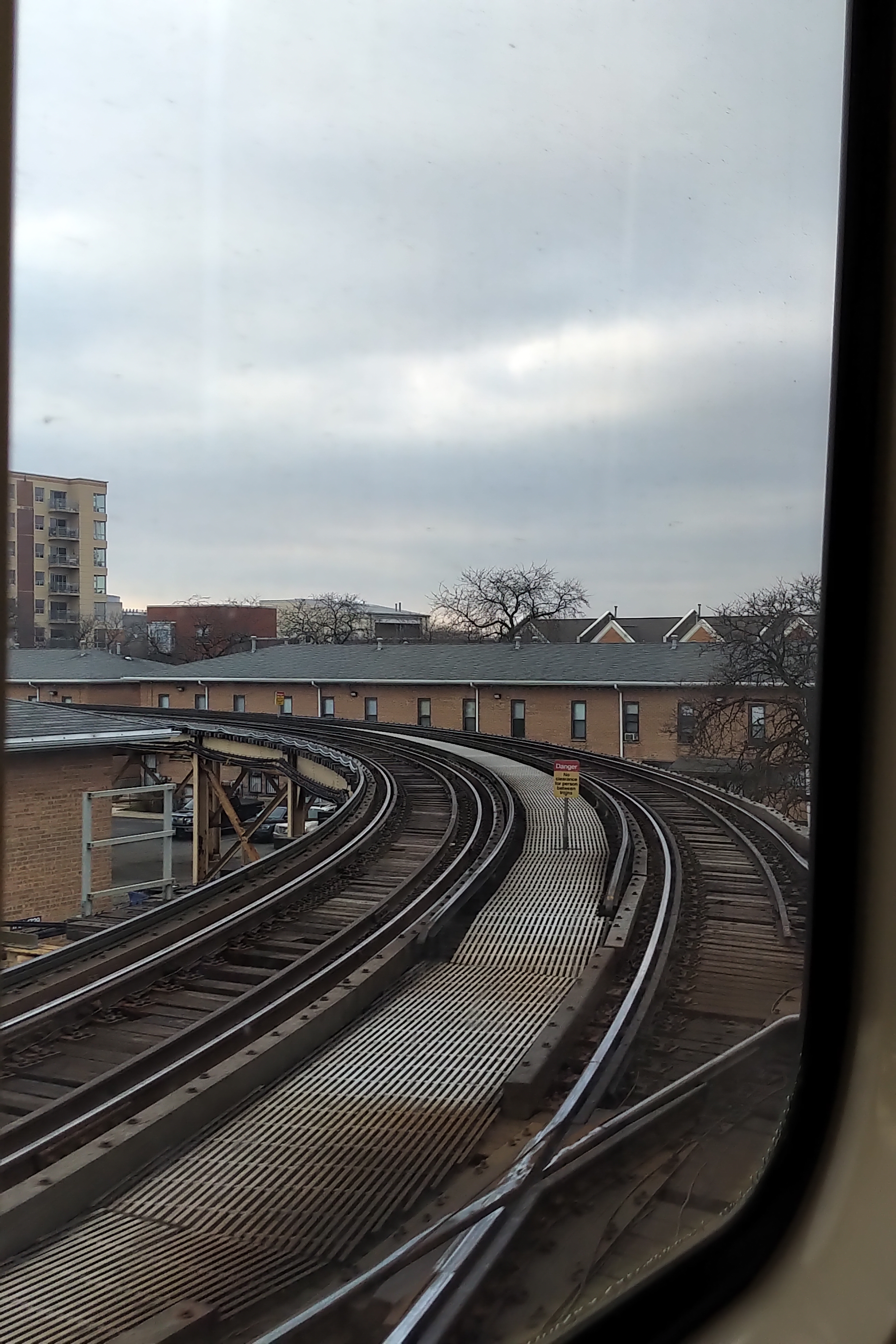
Washington Junction, near the site of the Lake Street Transfer station, in 2023

World War II interrupted the construction of the Dearborn Street subway; although the federal government allowed the continued construction of the State Street subway, it did not do so for the Dearborn Street subway even though it was 82 percent completed by 1942. After the war ended, work resumed on the Dearborn Street subway and it opened at midnight Sunday, February 25, 1951; at the same time, the Humboldt Park branch was restricted to a shuttle service to and from Damen on the Logan Square branch. Having been rendered obsolete by the subway, the Lake Street Transfer station was closed and the Lake Street's Ashland station reopened. The subway was predicted to reduce the travel time between Logan Square and downtown from 28 minutes to 15. Since construction had not started on the Congress Line, trains in the Dearborn subway stopped at its southern terminus at LaSalle and turned back. Despite its incomplete state, and complaints from riders no longer given a direct trip to the Near West Side, the new subway had over sixty percent higher ridership than the old Logan Square branch by the end of the year. The old Logan Square branch trackage south of its entrance to the subway became known as the Paulina Connector, connecting the branch with the rest of the "L" system.

Construction on the Congress Line began in 1954, leaving the Douglas branch with the issue of how to connect with the Loop in the meantime. The Paulina Connector south of Washington Boulevard (a block south of Lake Street) was reopened for the purpose, but the Metropolitan's old tracks north of Washington were replaced in revenue service by a direct connection to the Lake Street's trackage known as Washington Junction, located adjacent to the abandoned station. This junction contained an automatic interlocking mechanism, where Douglas Park trains carried an electric coil to switch them to the Connector that Lake Street trains lacked. This connection was used until the Congress Line was completed in 1958, after which the Douglas branch connected directly with it to use the Dearborn Street subway to go downtown, creating the "West-Northwest Route" that was renamed the Blue Line in 1992.

The Paulina Connector – both the original Metropolitan tracks and the newer Washington Junction – remained in non-revenue service. The old northbound track north of Washington Junction was removed in 1957, the southbound track continuing non-revenue operations. Wooden material from closed stations on the Connector, including Lake Street Transfer, was removed in the late 1950s to mitigate fire hazards, as were the lowest flights of stairs to deter trespassing, but the rest of the station would remain until the mid-to-late 1960s. The old Metropolitan trackage north of Washington Junction was sparsely used and most of it was demolished in 1964 with the right of way sold off; the remainder of the Connector reentered revenue service when the Pink Line was formed from it and the Douglas Park branch – by then renamed the Cermak branch – in 2006; the junction of the Pink Line with the modern-day Green Line (the modern service on the Lake Street Elevated) is at Washington Junction by the site of the station.

== Station details ==
Before 1913, the Wood and Lake stations had two wooden side platforms each. The Wood station had two station houses, one on each platform, designed in a "gingerbread" Queen Anne style, similar to the other stations on the route and the surviving station houses at Ashland. The station houses were heated by potbelly stoves, and while earlier plans had called for their ticket agent's booths to be placed on the sides of the station houses facing the street, they ended up being placed in alcoves adjacent to the platforms. The construction of the Lake Street Elevated's stations was contracted to Frank L. Underwood of Kansas City and Willard R. Green of New York. The Metropolitan's Lake station, which continued as its portion of the Lake Street Transfer, also had two wooden side platforms, but a station house located at street level on the north side of Lake Street. The station house, made of red pressed brick and white limestone trim, was designed similarly to other stations on the Logan Square branch, surviving examples of which are at California and Damen, with a corniced and dentiled front bay containing dual doors specifically marked "Entrance" and "Exit" and prolific use of terra cotta. Its wooden platforms had hipped roof tin canopies in the center and decorative cast-iron railings with diamond designs. Unlike elsewhere on the "L", station houses on the Metropolitan had central heating and a basement.

After the transfer was completed in 1913 the C&OP built new platforms; these platforms projected westward from the Metropolitan, with their eastern halves covered by arched canopies with lattice framing and their western halves open. Auxiliary exits onto Hermitage Avenue were located on the middle of the Lake Street platforms at the western ends of their canopies. On the Metropolitan's end, its platforms and canopies were extended southward to meet the southern Lake Street platform, and a new station house on the south side of Lake Street was constructed sometime before 1917, after which the original station house was used for storage. The final station was double-decked, with the Metropolitan's original two side platforms being augmented by the Lake Street Elevated's lower two side platforms. Access to the station was through stairwells from the station house to the Lake Street platforms, which had additional stairways to connect to the Metropolitan platforms; each Lake Street platform was connected to each Metropolitan platform, leading to four inter-platform stairwells in total. The station house presumably had direct access only to the southern eastbound Lake Street platform, with patrons wishing to access the Lake Street's northern westbound platform having to walk up to the Metropolitan platforms and walk down again.

Throughout the stations' existence, the Lake Street (Note: The Lake Street Elevated had a third track built west of Rockwell Street, approximately 1 mile (1.6 km) west of the transfer, to store cars not in revenue service.) and Metropolitan Elevateds had two tracks each in the vicinity, meaning that the transfer station had four tracks overall. Having had trouble constructing its trackage with two different companies and assembling much of its own infrastructure, the Lake Street Elevated contracted with Underwood and Green to construct its stations and the tracks west of Ashland. The Metropolitan's tracks were constructed by the West Side Construction Company, a company with the same officers as the Metropolitan itself and the chief engineer of E. W. Elliot, with steel and iron from the Carnegie Steel Company. Like the rest of the station, the tracks were double-decked in relation with one another.

=== Operations and connections ===
As originally opened, the Metropolitan's trains ran every six minutes between 6:00 a.m. and 6:30 p.m., and every ten minutes during the night; the average speed was 16 mph (26 km/h). Unlike the Lake Street Elevated, all the Metropolitan's motor cars allowed smoking. The Lake Street Elevated originally operated smoking cars at some times and not at others, but the C&OP banned all smoking on its trains in 1909. Smoking was banned by the city across the "L" and in streetcars in response to a 1918 influenza outbreak, a prohibition that has remained in force ever since.

The fare across the "L" was legally mandated to be a nickel (5 cents, $1.37 in 2021) in the late 19th and early 20th centuries. This fare continued until temporarily increased by a cent to $0.06 ($1.27 in 2021) in 1917 before stabilizing to a dime (10 cents, $1.35 in 2021) in 1920. Starting in 1922 fares were usually marketed in packs of three rides for 25 cents, or 8 1/3 cents per ride ($1.35 per ride in 2021), but individual fares remained 10 cents each. At the same time, a weekly pass was introduced, the first in a major American city, for $1.25 ($20.24 in 2021) for rides outside of Evanston and Wilmette. Fare control was originally by station agents posted at the station 24 hours a day; on the Lake Street, conductors were instead used for off-peak and night hours between 1921 and 1922 and consistently from 1925, while the Metropolitan used conductors between 1931 and 1937.

The Lake Street transfer station was served by a streetcar service on Lake Street; this service was consolidated with a streetcar service on State Street down to 63rd Street on September 14, 1924, as part of so-called "Through Route 16", or T.R. 16. Unlike many streetcar lines in Chicago, T.R. 16 had no owl service, and its last northbound car left 63rd Street at 12:35 a.m. During the day, streetcar lines in Chicago typically had intervals of between eight and fifteen minutes per car. After the transfer station was abandoned, streetcar service on Lake Street was cut back from downtown on November 15, 1953, and replaced by buses on May 30, 1954.

=== Ridership ===
Prior to the construction of the transfer, the Metropolitan's Lake station had a ridership that hovered around 250,000 a year, peaking at 296,116 in 1905. The Lake Street's Wood station had a similar ridership, but one which peaked at 441,045 in 1905. Once the transfer was in place, the two lines' contributions to station ridership were roughly equal, with the Lake Street edging out the Metropolitan each year.

Lake, Wood, and Lake Street Transfer station riderships from 1900 through 1948 View source data.

In 1936, the last year Lake Street records are available, the transfer station had 94,688 Lake Street riders and 87,533 Metropolitan riders for a combined ridership of 182,221. The following year's Metropolitan ridership was 181,909, suggesting that subsequent years' riderships were all recorded as being under the Metropolitan. The Metropolitan continued to record transfer ridership until 1948; that year, the Lake Street Transfer had 361,934 riders, a substantial 69.48 percent increase from the 213,561 of 1947. Throughout the 1940s, the transfer's ridership ranking within the Northwest branch's six stations varied significantly; in 1940 it was the second-least patronized station after Grand immediately to the north, while in 1948 it had the third-highest ridership after Damen and Chicago. For the "L" overall, in 1948 it was the 122nd-most ridden of 223 stations at the beginning of the year where ridership was recorded; in 1947 it had been the 174th-most ridden of 222 such stations. (Note: Several stations on the Niles Center and Westchester branches were permanently unstaffed and thus did not collect ridership statistics. Several stations closed on the "L" during 1948. Exchange station on the Stock Yards branch discontinued statistics after 1946, but adjacent Racine station began collecting them in 1948.)

== Works cited ==
- "The Metropolitan West Side Elevated Railroad of Chicago". The Street Railway Review. 5: 263–274. January 15, 1895.
- Borzo, Greg (2007). The Chicago "L". Charleston, South Carolina: Arcadia. ISBN 978-0-7385-5100-5 – via Google Books.
- Department of Subways and Traction (1939). A Comprehensive Plan for the Extension of the Subway System of the City of Chicago. Chicago: City of Chicago – via Internet Archive.
- Chicago Transit Authority (1951). Seventh Annual Report of Chicago Transit Board for the Fiscal Year ended December 31, 1951 – via Internet Archive.
- Chicago Transit Board (1954). Tenth Annual Report for the Fiscal Year ended December 31, 1954 – via Internet Archive.
- Public Information Department (1967). Congress Rapid Transit. Chicago: Chicago Transit Authority – via Internet Archive.
- CTA Rail Entrance, Annual Traffic, 1900–1979 (Report). Chicago: Chicago Transit Authority. October 1, 1979.
- Lind, Alan R. (1974). Chicago Surface Lines: An Illustrated History. Park Forest, Illinois: Transport History Press.
- Moffat, Bruce G. (1995). The "L": The Development of Chicago's Rapid Transit System, 1888–1932. Chicago: Central Electric Railfans' Association. ISBN 0-915348-30-6.
