= Grand station (CTA Logan Square branch) =

Rapid transit station in Chicago, 1895–1951

GRAND 1700W 500N
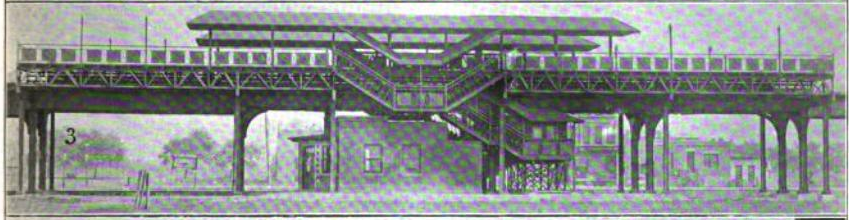
- Typical station on the Metropolitan's double-tracked lines, of which Grand was an example

General information
- Location: 1714 West Grand Avenue; Chicago, Illinois, US
- Coordinates: 41°53′28″N 87°40′13″W
- Owner: Chicago Transit Authority (1947–1951); Chicago Rapid Transit Company (1924–1947); See text before 1924
- Line: Logan Square branch
- Platforms: 2 side platforms
- Tracks: 2

Construction
- Structure type: Elevated

History
- Opened: May 6, 1895; 131 years ago
- Closed: February 25, 1951; 75 years ago

Passengers
- 1948: 128,950 ▼23.25% (CTA)
- Rank: 196 out of 223

Former services
Preceding station	Chicago "L"	Following station
Chicago toward Logan Square	Logan Square branch	Lake Street Transfer toward Marshfield
Location

Grand was a rapid transit station on the Chicago "L"'s Logan Square branch, one of the several branches of the Metropolitan West Side Elevated Railroad. Located on Grand Avenue, the station was constructed by the Metropolitan in the early 1890s and began service on May 6, 1895.

The Metropolitan, one of four companies that would build what became the Chicago "L", had many branches to serve Chicago's west side, including the Logan Square branch on which Grand lay. With some interruptions and financial issues, it operated these lines until 1911, when it handed operations to Chicago Elevated Railways, and formally merged into the Chicago Rapid Transit Company (CRT) in 1924. The "L" was taken over by the publicly-held Chicago Transit Authority (CTA) in 1947.

A subway had been planned since the late 1930s to reach downtown in a more direct way than the portion of the Logan Square branch where Grand stood. This subway was originally intended to supplement the old elevated Logan Square branch, but the CTA sought to simplify its routing and saw no need for the old branch's continued existence. The subway opened on February 25, 1951, with a station of its own on Grand Avenue; the old Grand station was then closed along with the others on the affected part of the branch. The station and its trackage remained in non-revenue service until it was demolished and the property sold off in 1964.

Grand was typical of the Metropolitan's stations, with two wooden side platforms and a brick station house at street level. For most of its existence it connected with a streetcar route that reached Navy Pier; both the "L" and streetcar had owl service. After the late 1910s it was also the lowest-ridership station on the Logan Square branch, and one of the least-patronized on the entire "L".

== History ==
The Metropolitan West Side Elevated Railroad Company was granted a 50-year franchise by the Chicago City Council on April 7, 1892, and began securing right of way shortly thereafter. As designed, the Metropolitan's operations would comprise a main line that went west from downtown to Marshfield, where three branches – one northwest to Logan Square, one due west to Garfield Park, and one southwest to Douglas Park – would diverge and serve various parts of Chicago's west side. A further branch to Humboldt Park would proceed due west from the Logan Square branch just past Robey Street. (Note: Technically, the Logan Square branch started after Robey and was, like the Humboldt Park branch, a divergence from what was formally known as the "Northwest branch". However, as early as 1898, even the Metropolitan itself was referring to the Northwest branch as part of the "Logan Square branch", although ridership statistics continued to separate them.) Unlike the competing South Side and Lake Street Elevateds, the Metropolitan never used steam traction; although intending to and building much of its structure with locomotives in mind, it decided in May 1894 to have electrified tracks instead, opening as the first revenue electric elevated railroad in the United States. The Metropolitan's tracks on the Logan Square branch were finished up to Robey by the middle of October 1894, and were given power in April 1895 for test and inspection runs. The Metropolitan began service at 6 a.m. on Monday, May 6, 1895, between Robey on the Logan Square branch and Canal on the main line. Eleven stations opened that day, one of which was on Grand Avenue.

The Metropolitan's lines were originally operated by the West Side Construction Company, which had been responsible for constructing them, and would be transferred to the Metropolitan on October 6, 1896. The backers and officers of the two companies were largely identical, however, so this transfer of ownership was nominal. The expenses incurred in constructing the Metropolitan's vast trackage would come back to haunt the company, which entered receivership in 1897; the similarly-named Metropolitan West Side Elevated Railway Company was organized in January 1899 and assumed operations on February 3 of that year. The new Metropolitan, along with the other companies operating "L" lines in Chicago, became a part of the Chicago Elevated Railways (CER) trust on July 1, 1911. CER acted as a de facto holding company for the "L" – unifying its operations, instituting the same management across the companies, and instituting free transfers between the lines starting in 1913 – but kept the underlying companies intact. This continued until the companies were formally merged into the single Chicago Rapid Transit Company (CRT), which assumed operations on January 9; the former Metropolitan was designated the Metropolitan Division of the CRT for administrative purposes. Although municipal ownership of transit had been a hotly-contested issue for half a century, the publicly-owned Chicago Transit Authority (CTA) would not be created until 1945, or assume operation of the "L" until October 1, 1947.

=== Closure and demolition ===
Plans for Chicago to have a subway system to relieve the severe congestion of, if not replace, its elevated trackage dated back to the early 20th century, but the city lagged in building subways. A plan developed for a subway to directly connect the west side with downtown; a 1939 plan also introduced the idea of replacing the Metropolitan's main line and Garfield Park branch with a section of rapid transit operating through a proposed Congress superhighway (the eventual Interstate 290). These sections of transit would be connected, allowing for the area's rapid transit to be routed through downtown rather than adhere to a trunk-and-branch model.

The subway's approval did not immediately imply the end of the old Logan Square branch; plans in 1939 included another proposed subway to connect the branch with the Ravenswood branch to the north and through-routing it with the Douglas Park branch to the south into a subway on Ashland Avenue to form a crosstown route. Damen Tower, serving the Humboldt Park branch divergence, was rebuilt with the expectation that it also would switch trains between the subway and the elevated, in the same manner as the State Street subway supplementing the earlier elevated North Side main line, and as late as 1949 commuters were promised such a setup that would have preserved the old Logan Square trackage. However, the CTA had no interest in operating either the old Logan Square elevated or the Humboldt Park branch; the new Damen Tower would never be installed with switching equipment, and the Logan Square branch south of Damen would be closed after the subway opened.

World War II interrupted the construction of the subway; although the federal government allowed the continued construction of the State Street subway, it did not do so for the Dearborn subway despite its being 82 percent complete in 1942. After the war ended, work resumed on the Dearborn subway and it opened at midnight Sunday, February 25, 1951. The subway was predicted to reduce the travel time between Logan Square and downtown from 28 minutes to 15. Since construction had not started on the Congress Line, trains in the subway turned back at its southern terminus at LaSalle. Despite this incomplete state, and complaints from riders no longer given a direct trip to the Near West Side, the new subway had over 60 percent higher ridership than the old Logan Square branch by the end of the year. The subway contains a station of its own on Grand Avenue.

The old Logan Square branch trackage south of its entrance to the subway became known as the Paulina Connector, connecting the branch with the rest of the "L" system now that it no longer had revenue service to the Loop. Construction on the Congress Line began in 1954, leaving the Douglas branch with the issue of how to connect with the Loop in the meantime. The Paulina Connector south of Washington Boulevard (about one-half mi (0.80 km) south of Grand) was reopened for the purpose, but the Metropolitan's old tracks north of Washington were replaced in revenue service by a direct connection to the Lake Street Elevated's trackage known as Washington Junction. This connection was used until the Congress Line was completed in 1958, after which the Douglas branch connected directly with it to use the Dearborn Street subway to go downtown, creating the "West-Northwest Route" that was renamed the Blue Line in 1992.

Wooden parts from the old stations on the Connector, including Grand, were removed to reduce fire hazards, as were the lowest flights of stairs to deter trespassing. North of Washington Junction, the old northbound track was removed in 1957 while the southbound track continued non-revenue operations. The portion of the Connector north of Kinzie Street, including where Division, Chicago, and Grand stations stood, was demolished in 1964 and the right of way sold to adjacent landowners.

== Station details ==
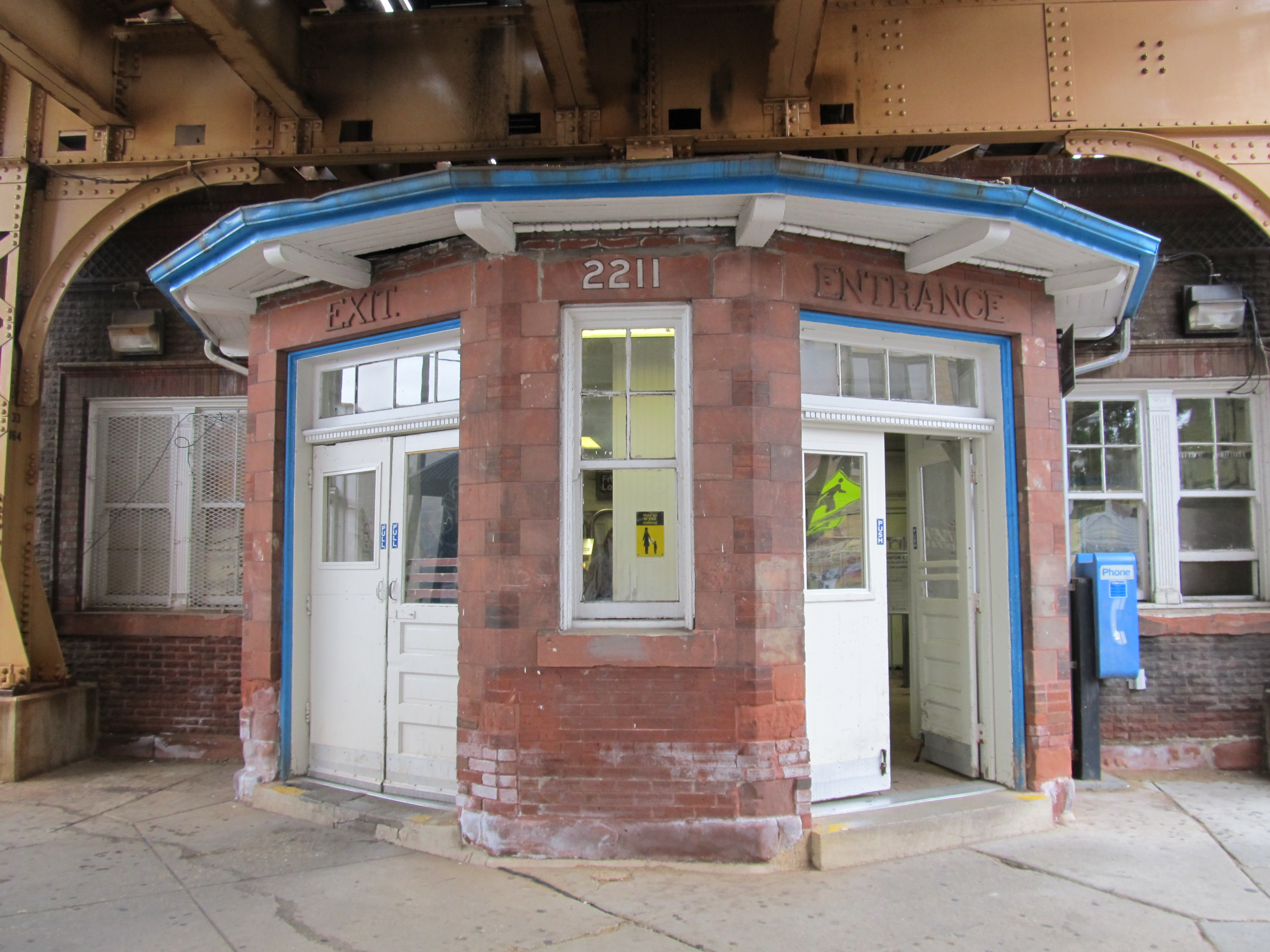
The station house at California in 2011; Grand's station house was of a similar design.

Grand had two wooden side platforms at its tracks and a station house at street level. The station house, made of red pressed brick and white limestone trim with a stone sill and foundation, was designed similarly to other stations on the Logan Square branch, surviving examples of which are at California and Damen, with a corniced and dentiled front bay containing dual doors specifically marked "Entrance" and "Exit" and prolific use of terra cotta. Its platforms had hipped roof tin canopies in the center and decorative cast-iron railings with diamond designs. Unlike elsewhere on the "L", station houses on the Metropolitan had central heating and a basement. The Metropolitan's tracks and stations were constructed by the West Side Construction Company, a company with the same officers as the Metropolitan itself and the chief engineer of E. W. Elliot, with steel and iron from the Carnegie Steel Company.

=== Operations and connections ===
As originally opened, the Metropolitan's trains ran every six minutes between 6 a.m. and 6:30 p.m., and every ten minutes during the night, on the main line and Northwest branch; the average speed was 16 mph (26 km/h). By 1898, the night hours were updated so that trains ran at 30-minute intervals on each branch, or 15 minutes on the Northwest branch. Fare control was usually by a station agent posted 24 hours a day, but conductors were used instead on the Northwest branch during night and off-peak hours from 1931 to 1934, and during 1936 and 1937.

Grand Avenue had streetcar routes as early as 1912, which were consolidated in 1916 to a single line with Navy Pier as its eastern end. By 1928, this route had owl service between 1 and 5 a.m., wherein cars ran once every thirty minutes; during the day, streetcar lines in Chicago typically had intervals of between eight and fifteen minutes per car. Service was cut back from Navy Pier in 1941, and buses began supplementing streetcars in 1949, replacing them altogether in 1951 shortly after the station's abandonment.

=== Ridership ===
Grand's ridership peaked in 1902 at 634,530 passengers. Between 1900 and 1913, the station was consistently in the middle of the Northwest branch's rankings, surpassing the stations of Lake and Madison to its south but trailing Robey, Division, and Chicago to its north. By the late 1910s, the station was the lowest-ridership station on the branch except for the Metropolitan's portion of the Lake Street Transfer station, the successor to Lake and a station whose ridership the Metropolitan shared with the Lake Street Elevated, giving a combined ridership higher than that of Grand; in any event, Grand's ridership also trailed every station on the Logan Square branch proper. Ridership last exceeded 600,000 passengers in 1907, 500,000 in 1910, 400,000 in 1912, 300,000 in 1924, and 200,000 in 1929. During the 1930s, ridership dropped below six figures, bottoming out at 83,003 patrons in 1933. In the last year ridership records are available, 1948, Grand served 128,950 passengers, a 23.27 percent decrease from the 168,006 in 1947. In 1948, it was the 196th-most ridden of the 223 stations on the Chicago "L" at the beginning of the year where ridership was recorded; in 1947, it had been the 193rd-most ridden of 222 such stations. (Note: Several stations on the Niles Center and Westchester branches were permanently unstaffed and thus did not collect ridership statistics. Several stations closed on the "L" during 1948. Exchange station on the Stock Yards branch discontinued statistics after 1946, but adjacent Racine station began collecting them in 1948.)

== Works cited ==
- "The Metropolitan West Side Elevated Railroad of Chicago". The Street Railway Review. 5: 263–274. January 15, 1895.
- Department of Subways and Traction (1939). A Comprehensive Plan for the Extension of the Subway System of the City of Chicago. City of Chicago – via Archive.org.
- Borzo, Greg (2007). The Chicago "L". Arcadia. ISBN 9780738551005 – via Google Books.
- Chicago Transit Authority (1951). Seventh Annual Report of Chicago Transit Board for the Fiscal Year ended December 31, 1951 – via Archive.org.
- Chicago Transit Board (1954). Tenth Annual Report for the Fiscal Year ended December 31, 1954 – via Archive.org.
- Public Information Department (1967). Congress Rapid Transit. Chicago: Chicago Transit Authority – via Archive.org.
- CTA Rail Entrance, Annual Traffic, 1900–1979 (Report). Chicago: Chicago Transit Authority. October 1, 1979.
- Lind, Alan R. (1974). Chicago Surface Lines: An Illustrated History. Park Forest, Illinois: Transport History Press.
- Moffat, Bruce G. (1995). The "L": The Development of Chicago's Rapid Transit System, 1888–1932. Chicago: Central Electric Railfans' Association. ISBN 0-915348-30-6.
- "R. L. Polk & Co.'s Chicago Street and Avenue Guide" (PDF). Polk's Chicago Directory 1923. Chicago: R. L. Polk & Co. 1923. pp. 193–228 – via ChicagoAncestors.org.
