= Madison station (CTA) =

Rapid transit station in Chicago, 1895–1951

MADISON 1700W 1S
- The Madison station house in its final days, housing a hot dog stand in the 1990s; the steel structure behind the station house was used to support the stairways' landings

General information
- Location: 1718 West Madison Street; Chicago, Illinois, United States
- Coordinates: 41.881491°N 87.670108°W
- Owner: Chicago Transit Authority
- Line: Logan Square branch
- Platforms: 2 side platforms
- Tracks: 2

Construction
- Structure type: Elevated

History
- Opened: May 6, 1895; 131 years ago
- Closed: February 25, 1951; 75 years ago

Passengers
- 1948: 217,551 ▼21.12% (CTA)
- Rank: 165 out of 223

Former services
Preceding station	Chicago "L"	Following station
Lake Street Transfer toward Logan Square	Logan Square branch	Marshfield Terminus
Location

Madison was a rapid transit station on the Chicago "L"'s Metropolitan West Side Elevated Railroad, serving its Logan Square branch from 1895 to 1951. The station was typical of those constructed by the Metropolitan, with a Queen Anne station house and two wooden side platforms adjacent to the tracks. For much of its existence, Madison served the nearby sports arena Chicago Stadium.

The Metropolitan was one of four founding companies of the "L", and the first of its lines to be powered by electricity. The "L"'s companies merged operations under Chicago Elevated Railways (CER) in 1911 and formally merged into the Chicago Rapid Transit Company (CRT) in 1924. Private ownership of the "L" ended in 1947 when the public Chicago Transit Authority (CTA) assumed operations.

Plans to replace the Logan Square branch where Madison was located with a subway to provide a more direct connection to downtown had dated to the late 1930s, and the CTA opened the Milwaukee-Dearborn subway on February 25, 1951, closing Madison and its adjacent stations in the process, although Madison's tracks and station house remained standing. The station house continued in use as a commercial building into the late 1990s, when it was demolished despite recognition of its historic significance. The tracks continued to be used for non-revenue service until they were reopened as part of the Pink Line in 2006.

Given the proximity of the site to Chicago Stadium and its successor the United Center, there have been several attempts at reviving the station, especially after the opening of the Pink Line. In 2017, however, the CTA decided instead to reopen a station on Damen for the Green Line for added service to the United Center. In 2025 the city announced it was exploring a rebuild of the station as part of Project 1901.

== History ==
The Metropolitan West Side Elevated Railroad Company was granted a 50-year franchise by the Chicago City Council on April 7, 1892, and began securing right of way shortly thereafter. As designed, the Metropolitan's operations would comprise a main line that went west from downtown to Marshfield, where three branches – one northwest to Logan Square, one due west to Garfield Park, and one southwest to Douglas Park – would diverge and serve various parts of Chicago's west side. A further branch to Humboldt Park would proceed due west from the Logan Square branch just past Robey station. (Note: Technically, the Logan Square branch started after Robey and was, like the Humboldt Park branch, a divergence from what was formally known as the "Northwest branch". However, as early as 1898, even the Metropolitan itself was referring to the Northwest branch as part of the "Logan Square branch", although ridership statistics continued to separate them.) Unlike the competing South Side and Lake Street Elevateds, the Metropolitan never used steam traction. Although it had originally intended to, and indeed had built much of its structure under the assumption that locomotives would be used, it decided in May 1894 to have electrified tracks instead, making it upon its opening the first electric elevated railroad in the United States. The Metropolitan's tracks on the Logan Square branch were finished by the middle of October 1894, and were powered on in April 1895 for test and inspection runs. The Metropolitan began service at 6 a.m. on Monday, May 6, 1895, between Robey on the Logan Square branch and Canal on the main line. Eleven stations opened that day, one of which was on Madison Street.

The Metropolitan's lines were originally operated by the West Side Construction Company, which had been responsible for constructing them, and were transferred to the Metropolitan on October 6, 1896. The backers and officers of the two companies were largely identical, however, so this transfer of ownership was nominal. The expenses incurred in constructing the Metropolitan's vast trackage would catch up to the company, which entered receivership in 1897; the similarly-named Metropolitan West Side Elevated Railway Company was organized in January 1899 and assumed operations on February 3 of that year. The Metropolitan, along with the other companies operating "L" lines in Chicago, became a part of the Chicago Elevated Railways (CER) trust on July 1, 1911. CER acted as a de facto holding company for the "L" – unifying its operations, instituting the same management across the companies, and instituting free transfers between the lines starting in 1913 – but kept the underlying companies intact. This continued until the companies were formally merged into the single Chicago Rapid Transit Company (CRT), which assumed operations on January 9, 1924; the former Metropolitan was designated the Metropolitan Division of the CRT for administrative purposes. Although municipal ownership of transit had been a hotly-contested issue for half a century, the publicly-owned Chicago Transit Authority (CTA) would not be created until 1945, or assume operation of the "L" until October 1, 1947.

=== Closure and demolition ===
Plans for Chicago to have a subway system to relieve the severe congestion of, if not replace, its elevated trackage dated back to the early 20th century, but the city lagged in building subways. Chicago petitioned the Public Works Administration (PWA) for construction funds for a subway on State Street in 1937. The petition originally included a proposal for two downtown east-west streetcar tunnels. Harold L. Ickes, the administrator of the PWA and a longtime Chicagoan, vetoed the streetcar tunnel plan and insisted instead on a second subway that would go under Dearborn Street and Milwaukee Avenue, which would bypass the southern part of the branch and provide a more direct route from Logan Square to downtown. Although this idea engendered considerable local opposition, especially from mayor Edward Joseph Kelly, Ickes's influence in the federal government led to the Dearborn plan being adopted in 1938. A 1939 plan also introduced the idea of replacing the Metropolitan's main line and Garfield Park branch with a section of rapid transit operating through a proposed Congress superhighway (the eventual Interstate 290). These sections of transit would be connected, allowing for the area's rapid transit to be routed through downtown rather than adhere to a trunk-and-branch model.

The subway's approval did not immediately imply the end of the old Logan Square branch; plans in 1939 included another proposed subway to connect the branch with the Ravenswood branch to the north and through-routing it with the Douglas Park branch to the south into a subway on Ashland Avenue to form a crosstown route. Damen Tower serving the Humboldt Park branch divergence was rebuilt with the expectation that it also would switch trains between the subway and the elevated, much like the State Street subway connects with the earlier elevated North Side main line that remained standing after its construction, and as late as 1949 commuters were promised such a setup that would have preserved the old Logan Square trackage. However, the CTA had no interest in operating either the old Logan Square elevated or the Humboldt Park branch; the new Damen Tower would never be installed with switching equipment, and the Logan Square branch south of Damen would be closed after the Dearborn subway opened.

World War II interrupted the construction of the Dearborn Street subway; although the federal government allowed the continued construction of the State Street subway, it did not do so for the Dearborn Street subway even though it was 82 percent completed by 1942. After the war ended, work resumed on the Dearborn Street subway and it opened at midnight Sunday, February 25, 1951; it was predicted to reduce the travel time between Logan Square and downtown from 28 minutes to 15. Since construction had not started on the Congress Line, trains in the Dearborn subway stopped at its southern terminus at LaSalle and turned back. Despite its incomplete state, and complaints from riders no longer given a direct trip to the Near West Side, the new subway had over 60 percent higher ridership than the old Logan Square branch by the end of the year.

The infrastructure of the former parts of the Logan Square branch remained standing and became known as the Paulina Connector and was used to connect the branch and subway to the rest of the "L" system. Construction on the Congress Line began in 1954, leaving the Douglas branch with the issue of how to connect with the Loop in the meantime. The Paulina Connector south of Washington Boulevard, including where Madison station had stood, was reopened for the purpose, but Madison station remained abandoned. This use continued until the Congress Line was complete in 1958, connecting with the Douglas branch to form the "West-Northwest Route", after which the Connector returned to non-revenue use only.

The canopies and platforms at Madison were removed after its closure, but its station house was converted to commercial use, seeing use as a hot dog stand in the 1990s. The station house survived for much of the 20th century; the city of Chicago conducted the Chicago Historic Resources Survey between 1983 and 1995, marking tens of thousands of structures across Chicago for potential landmark status and color-coding them based on significance. The Madison station house received a code of "Orange", the second-highest color code and indicating a structure significant in the context of its community. Despite this status, the station house was demolished in the 1990s, although the truncated ends of the trusses that had supported the station's platforms and a steel lattice that had been located behind the station house remained until the area was renovated to reenter revenue service as the Pink Line in 2006.

=== Possible revivals ===
The rapid transit lines and stations by the United Center, which is marked in blue The Green Line and Damen station The Blue Line and Illinois Medical District station The Pink Line and site of the Madison station

During Madison's lifetime, it served the nearby Chicago Stadium, a sports arena that was replaced by the United Center in the 1990s. Given the site's proximity to the United Center, there have been several proposals to revive the station. One such proposal was to reopen the station for the 1996 Democratic National Convention hosted at the United Center, but this did not happen. In 2004, while the CTA was planning a putative "Silver Line" service on the Connector that would become the Pink Line, two new stations were proposed on the Line at Madison and at Van Buren for transfer to the Blue Line. The Chicago Bulls, housed in the United Center, planned in 2012 to build a $95 million complex in the area based on possible tax breaks. Mayor Rahm Emanuel suggested building a station at Madison to serve the complex; the CTA declined to reopen a station at Madison at that time, but left open the possibility of a future revival.

The Illinois Medical District station has an entrance on Damen Avenue that is used by attendees of events at the United Center, who are also able to use the Ashland station on the Green and Pink Lines as well as local buses. On February 9, 2017, the CTA announced plans for a new Green Line station on Damen Avenue to accommodate the United Center. This new Damen station, a block and a half from the United Center, is much closer than the 0.75 miles (1.21 km) of the Medical District station, and replaces an earlier station on the site that had been closed in 1948. Despite being located farther away from the United Center than Madison, the Damen site was chosen due to its location near industrial and residential areas and to close a 1.5 miles (2.4 km) gap on the Green Line between Ashland and California.

In 2025, it was announced that a new CTA Pink Line station is being explored to be built as part of the Project 1901 development. It would be located directly east of the United Center and rebuild the former Madison station demolished in 1951.

== Station details ==
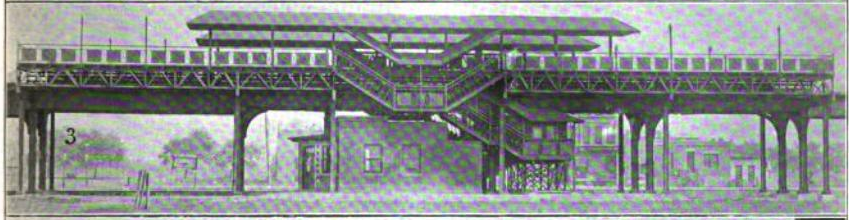
Typical station on the Metropolitan's double-tracked lines, of which Madison was an example

The station was designed by the Metropolitan's engineers and constructed by the Jonathan Clark and Sons Company for general contractor Alfred Walcott. The station house was made of red pressed brick with stone sills and foundations; much like the other stations on the Logan Square branch, surviving examples of which are at California station and Damen, it has been described as "Queen-Anne influenced with Romanesque features". Its facade was dominated by a corniced and dentiled semicircular bay with two doors marked "entrance" and "exit" despite the lack of an enforcement mechanism for either, as well as a wooden awning for the bay underlaid by wooden beads.

The station had two side platforms. In common with stations throughout the Metropolitan's system, the platforms and stairs were wooden on a steel structure, and had canopies with iron frames and tin hipped roofs. The platforms had railings with square cast iron plates with diamond designs.

=== Operations and connections ===
As originally opened, the Metropolitan's trains ran every six minutes between 6 a.m. and 6:30 p.m., and every ten minutes during the night; the average speed was 16 mph (26 km/h). By 1898, this schedule was updated so that trains ran at 30-minute intervals on each branch, or 15 minutes on the combined Northwest branch, during night hours. Unlike the Lake Street Elevated, which operated smoking cars at some times but not at others, all of the Metropolitan's motor cars allowed smoking. Smoking was banned by the city across the "L" and in streetcars in response to a 1918 influenza outbreak, a prohibition that has remained in force ever since.

The fare across the "L" was legally mandated to be a nickel (5 cents, $1.37 in 2021) in the late 19th and early 20th centuries. The nickel fare continued until temporarily increased by a cent to 6 cents in 1917 ($1.27 in 2021) before stabilizing to a dime in 1920 (10 cents, $1.35 in 2021). Starting in 1922, fares were usually marketed in packs of three rides for 25 cents, or 8 1/3 cents per ride ($1.35 per ride in 2021), but individual fares remained 10 cents each. At the same time, a weekly pass was introduced, the first in a major American city, for $1.25 ($20.24 in 2021) for rides entirely within city limits. Unlike other elevated railroads at the time, the Metropolitan did not sell tickets for passengers to present to staff; instead customers gave their nickel to the station agent to record in a registry, a practice similar to streetcars at the time. This practice was ultimately adopted by the other elevateds. Station agents on the Metropolitan were originally on duty 24 hours a day; fare collection by on-train conductors was adopted on the Northwest between 1931 and 1934 and again during 1936 and 1937.

Madison Street was one of the "Big Five" streetcar lines of Chicago in the early-to-mid 20th century, which carried the most passengers, had the shortest intervals between cars, and had two-car trains in contrast to the typical one-car Chicago streetcar the most often. Madison Street was home to some of the earliest transit in Chicago, having a horse car service starting from 1859. Cable cars operated on the street in the station's vicinity until they were replaced by streetcars on August 19, 1906. This line was formally codified as Through Route 20 (TR 20) in July 1921, but this did not tangibly affect service at the station. Two-car motor-trailer trains ran on Madison from October 14, 1923, to July 19, 1930; multiple-unit control trains began on an experimental basis on July 13, 1924. As of 1928, TR 20 had owl service between 1:01 and 5:20 a.m., during which cars ran for every ten minutes; during the day, streetcar lines in Chicago typically had intervals of between eight and fifteen minutes. After the station was closed, buses replaced streetcars on weekends starting May 11, 1952 and altogether on December 13, 1953.

=== Ridership ===
In the last year ridership records are available, 1948, Madison served 217,551 passengers, a 21.12 percent decrease from the 275,802 in 1947. In 1948, it was the 165th-most ridden of the 223 stations on the Chicago "L" at the beginning of the year where ridership was recorded; in 1947, it had been the 148th-most ridden of 222 such stations. (Note: Several stations on the Niles Center and Westchester branches were permanently unstaffed and thus did not collect ridership statistics. Several stations closed on the "L" during 1948. Exchange station on the Stock Yards branch lacked statistics for 1947 but returned in 1948.)

== Works cited ==
- "The Metropolitan West Side Elevated Railroad of Chicago". The Street Railway Review. 5: 263–274. January 15, 1895.
- Borzo, Greg (2007). The Chicago "L". Charleston, South Carolina: Arcadia. ISBN 9780738551005 – via Google Books.
- Department of Subways and Traction (1939). A Comprehensive Plan for the Extension of the Subway System of the City of Chicago. Chicago: City of Chicago – via Internet Archive.
- Chicago Transit Authority (1951). Seventh Annual Report of Chicago Transit Board for the Fiscal Year ended December 31, 1951 – via Archive.org.
- Chicago Transit Board (1954). Tenth Annual Report for the Fiscal Year ended December 31, 1954 – via Archive.org.
- Chicago Transit Authority (1967). Congress Rapid Transit (Report).
- CTA Rail Entrance, Annual Traffic, 1900–1979 (Report). Chicago: Chicago Transit Authority. October 1, 1979.
- Lind, Alan R. (1974). Chicago Surface Lines: An Illustrated History. Park Forest, Illinois: Transport History Press.
- Moffat, Bruce G. (1995). The "L": The Development of Chicago's Rapid Transit System, 1888–1932. Chicago: Central Electric Railfans' Association. ISBN 0-915348-30-6.
- Polk's Chicago (Illinois) Numerical Street and Avenue Directory (PDF). Chicago: R. L. Polk and Company. 1928. Archived from the original (PDF) on August 27, 2016 – via Chicago Historical Society.
- Weller, Peter; Stark, Fred (1999). The Living Legacy of the Chicago Aurora and Elgin. San Francisco: Forum Press. ISBN 0-945213-41-7 – via Internet Archive.
