= Logan Square branch =

Segment of the Chicago "L"

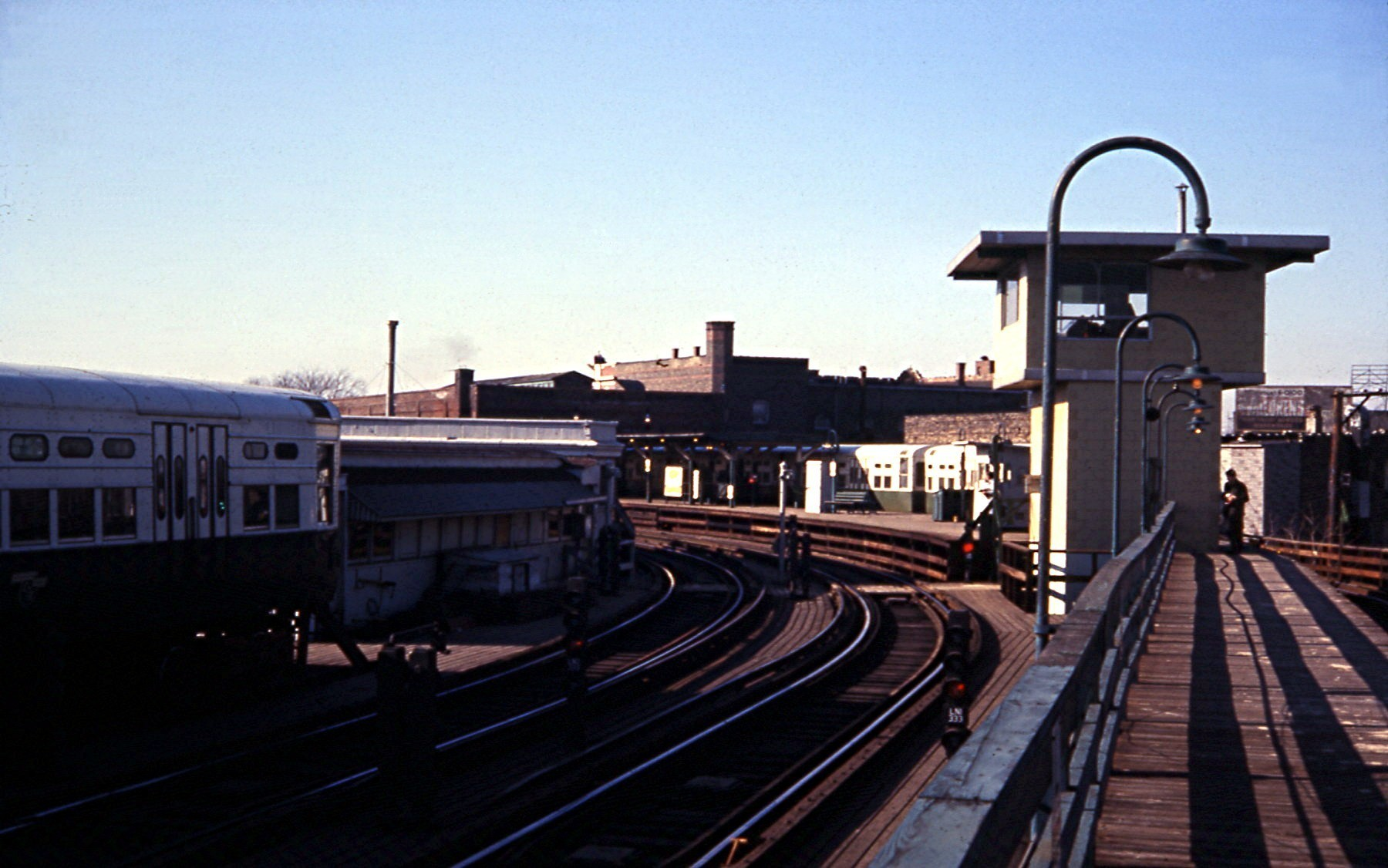
- The Logan Square terminal in 1969

Overview
- Status: Partially replaced
- Owner: Chicago Transit Authority (1947–present); Chicago Rapid Transit Company (1924–1947); Metropolitan West Side Elevated Railroad (1895–1924)
- Stations: 9 (pre-1951, not including Marshfield); 3 (surviving as of 2022, not including the post-1970 Logan Square station)

Service
- Type: Rapid transit
- System: Chicago 'L'
- Services: Blue Pink

History
- Opened: May 6, 1895; 131 years ago
- Paulina Connector closed (Note: The connector between the Lake Street Elevated and the Douglas (Cermak) branch reopened in 2006 as part of the Pink Line (CTA).): February 25, 1951; 75 years ago

Technical
- Number of tracks: 2
- Character: Elevated
- Track gauge: 4 ft 8 1/2 in (1,435 mm)
- Electrification: Third rail, 600 V DC
- Operating speed: 16 mph (26 km/h) (1895)

The Logan Square branch is an elevated rapid transit line of the Chicago "L", where it was one of the branches of the Metropolitan West Side Elevated Railroad. Diverging north from the Metropolitan's main line west of Marshfield station, it opened in 1895 and served Chicago's Logan Square and West Town neighborhoods. North of Damen station, the Humboldt Park branch diverged from the Logan Square branch, going west to serve Humboldt Park. The original Logan Square branch was separated into several sections in 1951, some of which remain in revenue service today.

What history remembers as the "Logan Square branch" was actually the combination of two routes. Diverging from Marshfield was the Metropolitan's Northwest branch, proceeding northward and northwestward to Damen. The Northwest branch then split into the Humboldt Park branch and the Logan Square branch proper. As early as 1898, however, even the Metropolitan itself considered the Northwest branch as part of the "Logan Square branch", although ridership statistics continued to separate them.

The Northwest branch and main line were the first Metropolitan lines to open, entering service on May 6, 1895; combined, they were the first revenue electric elevated railroad in the United States. The Logan Square branch proper followed on May 25, and the Humboldt Park branch opened on July 29. The Metropolitan continued to operate its lines, with some interruptions and difficulties, until it handed control over to the Chicago Elevated Railways (CER) trust in 1911 and formally merged into the Chicago Rapid Transit Company (CRT) in 1924. The Milwaukee-Dearborn Subway was proposed in the late 1930s to provide more direct service from Logan Square to downtown. The old elevated lines were originally intended to continue revenue operation alongside this subway. The publicly-owned Chicago Transit Authority (CTA), which had assumed control of the "L" in 1947, decided to instead discontinue service on the elevated lines with the opening of the subway.

The subway opened in 1951, splitting the original branch into two sections. The branch north of the subway's entrance continued in revenue service as the "Milwaukee branch" and, after the closure of the Humboldt Park branch and extensions in 1970 and the early 1980s, currently serves as the O'Hare branch of the Blue Line; the 1970 extension entailed the replacement of the original Logan Square terminal with a new subway through-station. Damen, Western, and California are the last remaining stations of the Logan Square branch. The branch south of the subway, having been rendered obsolete, nevertheless served as the only link of the surviving branch to the rest of the "L" system and was kept in non-revenue operation as the Paulina Connector. After half a century, and the demolition of its northern half, the Connector re-entered revenue service in 2006 as part of the Pink Line.

== History ==
The Logan Square and Humboldt Park branches highlighted in gray. The Humboldt Park branch was the western protrusion. The Logan Square branch was strictly the northwestern protrusion and the Northwest branch the southern leg linking the two branches, but in practice the phrase "Logan Square branch" encompassed both the Logan Square and Northwest branches

The Metropolitan West Side Elevated Railroad Company was granted a 50-year franchise by the Chicago City Council on April 7, 1892, and began securing right of way shortly thereafter. As designed, the Metropolitan's operations would comprise a main line that went west from downtown to Marshfield, where three branches – one going northwest, one going due west to Garfield Park, and one going southwest to Douglas Park – would diverge and serve various parts of Chicago's west side. The formally titled "Northwest branch" would continue to Robey station, where it would split into the "Logan Square branch" going further northwest and the Humboldt Park branch going due west. However, as early as 1898, the Metropolitan itself was referring to the Northwest branch as part of the "Logan Square branch". The Northwest branch's tracks were finished by October 1894 and powered on in April 1895 for test runs; service on the branch and the main line commenced on May 6 between Robey and Canal. Service was provided to Logan Square on May 25, and the Humboldt Park branch opened on July 29.

The Metropolitan's lines were originally operated by the West Side Construction Company, which had been responsible for constructing them, and would be transferred to the Metropolitan on October 6, 1896. The backers and officers of the two companies were largely identical, however, so this transfer of ownership was nominal. The expenses incurred in constructing the Metropolitan's vast trackage would come back to haunt the company, which entered receivership in 1897; the similarly-named Metropolitan West Side Elevated Railway Company was organized in January 1899 and assumed operations on February 3 of that year. The new Metropolitan, along with the other companies operating "L" lines in Chicago, became a part of the Chicago Elevated Railways (CER) trust on July 1, 1911. CER acted as a de facto holding company for the "L" – unifying its operations, instituting the same management across the companies, and instituting free transfers between the lines starting in 1913 – but kept the underlying companies intact. This continued until the companies were formally merged into the single Chicago Rapid Transit Company (CRT) in 1924, which assumed operations on January 9; the former Metropolitan was designated the Metropolitan Division of the CRT for administrative purposes. Although municipal ownership of transit had been a hotly-contested issue for half a century, the publicly-owned Chicago Transit Authority (CTA) would not be created until 1945, or assume operation of the "L" until October 1, 1947.

=== Opening of the Milwaukee–Dearborn subway ===
Plans for Chicago to have a subway system to relieve the severe congestion of, if not replace, its elevated trackage dated back to the early 20th century, but the city lagged in building subways. Chicago petitioned the Public Works Administration (PWA) for construction funds for a subway on State Street in 1937. The petition originally included a proposal for two downtown east-west streetcar tunnels. Harold L. Ickes, the administrator of the PWA and a longtime Chicagoan, vetoed the streetcar tunnel plan and insisted instead on a second subway that would go under Dearborn Street and Milwaukee Avenue, which would provide a more direct route from Logan Square to downtown. Although this idea engendered considerable local opposition, especially from mayor Edward Joseph Kelly, Ickes's influence in the federal government led to the Dearborn plan being adopted in 1938. A 1939 plan also introduced the idea of replacing the Metropolitan's main line and Garfield Park branch with a section of rapid transit operating through a proposed superhighway on Congress Street (the eventual Interstate 290). These sections of transit would be connected, allowing for the area's rapid transit to be routed through downtown rather than adhere to a trunk-and-branch model.

The subway's approval did not immediately imply the end of the old Logan Square branch; plans in 1939 included another proposed subway to connect the branch with the Ravenswood branch to the north and through-routing it with the Douglas Park branch to the south into a subway on Ashland Avenue to form a crosstown route. Damen Tower serving the Humboldt Park branch divergence was rebuilt with the expectation that it also would switch trains between the subway and the elevated, much like the State Street subway connects with the earlier elevated North Side main line that remained standing after its construction, and as late as 1949 commuters were promised such a setup that would have preserved the old Logan Square trackage. However, the CTA had no interest in operating either the old Logan Square elevated or the Humboldt Park branch; the new Damen Tower would never be installed with switching equipment, and the Logan Square branch south of Damen would be closed after the Dearborn subway opened.

World War II interrupted the construction of the Dearborn Street subway; although the federal government allowed the continued construction of the State Street subway, it did not do so for the Dearborn Street subway even though it was 82 percent completed by 1942. After the war ended, work resumed on the Dearborn Street subway and it opened at the midnight beginning Sunday, February 25, 1951; at the same time, the Humboldt Park branch was restricted to a shuttle service to and from Damen on the Logan Square branch. Having been rendered obsolete by the subway, the Lake Street Transfer station was closed and the Lake Street's Ashland station reopened. The subway was predicted to reduce the travel time between Logan Square and downtown from 28 minutes to 15. Since construction had not started on the Congress Line, trains in the Dearborn subway stopped at its southern terminus at LaSalle and turned back. Despite its incomplete state, and complaints from riders no longer given a direct trip to the Near West Side, the new subway had over 60 percent higher ridership than the old Logan Square branch by the end of the year.

=== After 1951 ===
The Logan Square branch and its surviving parts; the part overlapping the Blue Line, marked in blue, is part of the O'Hare branch, whereas the part overlapping the Pink Line, marked in pink, is the surviving portion of the Paulina Connector. The remainder of the Logan Square branch and the Humboldt Park branch have been demolished.

After the replacement of the southern half of the branch in 1951, the two sections of transit had different histories.

==== Closure of Humboldt Park branch, O'Hare branch ====
The Humboldt Park branch had been targeted for closure as early as early 1950, and closed in 1952. The surviving portion of the Logan Square branch was extended to Jefferson Park in 1970, Rosemont in 1983, and O'Hare in 1984.

==== Paulina Connector ====
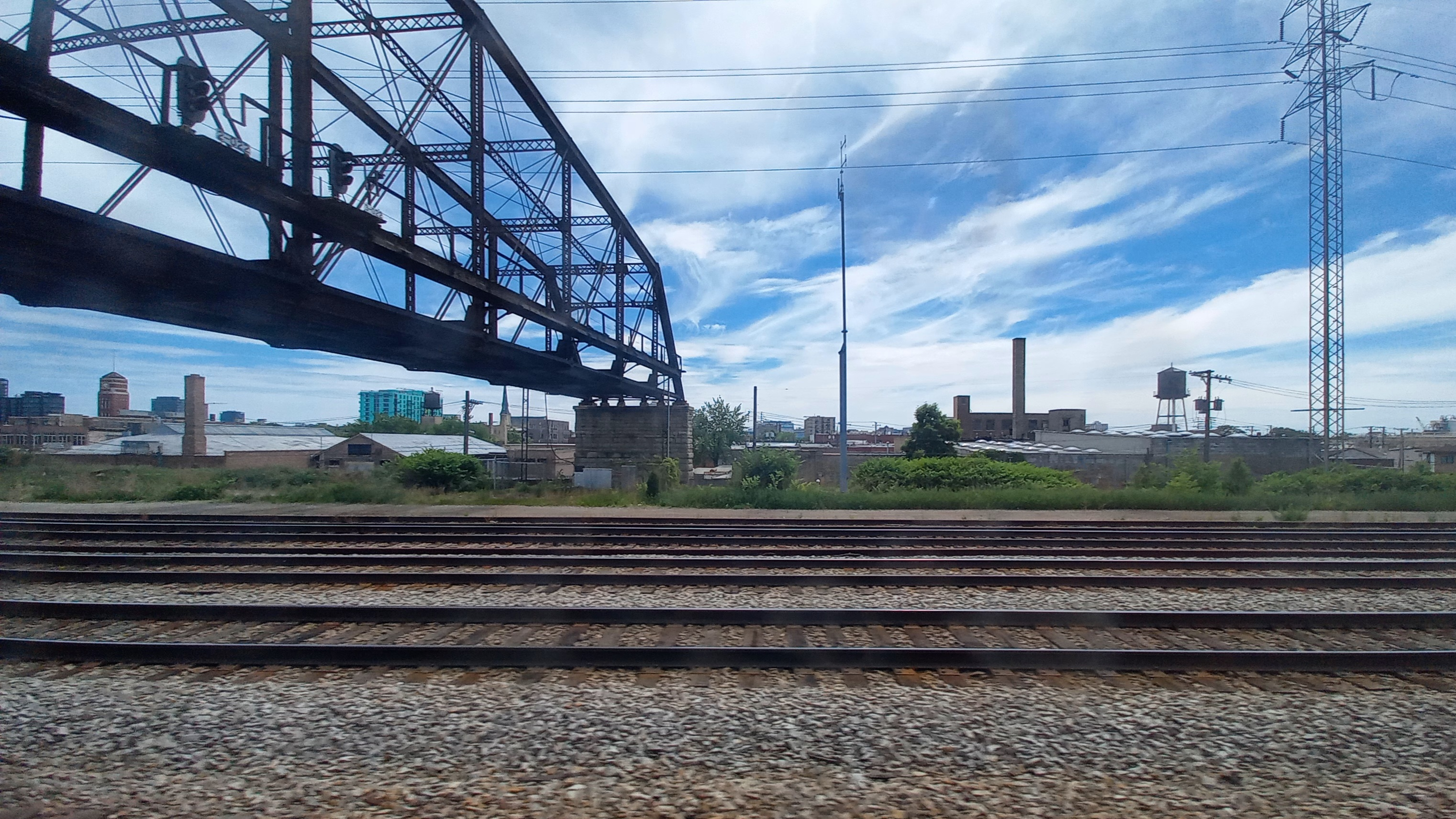
The truss bridge remains intact after much of the Paulina Connector was demolished.

The portion between the junction northwest of the subway portal and the other Metropolitan West Side branches was retained as the Paulina Connector, a non-revenue connecting track, as the other Met branches were rerouted from the Loop into the south end of the Milwaukee–Dearborn subway, meaning there was no other connection to the rest of the "L" system. As part of the replacement of the Garfield Park branch with the Congress branch, a new junction between the Paulina Connector and the Lake Street branch was constructed, allowing trains from the Douglas branch to continue to reach the Loop while construction was ongoing. After construction was complete, Douglas branch trains resumed using the Milwaukee–Dearborn subway, and the connector was returned to non-revenue use only. The portion north of the Lake Street branch was demolished in 1964, as the junction with the Lake Street branch rendered it superfluous.

By 2003, the Paulina Connector was in need of renovation, as it remained the only connection between the Blue Line and the rest of the system. As part of a renovation of the Cermak (formerly Douglas) branch, the connector was rebuilt. Following the reconstruction, in 2006, the CTA introduced a new service pattern in which trains from the Cermak branch use the Paulina Connector to travel to the Loop via the junction with the Lake Street branch. This service is the current Pink Line.

Besides the Paulina Connector and the section of the Blue Line between Damen and Logan Square, one other extant section remains at Paulina and Kinzie Streets, where a truss bridge that carried trains over the Metra rail lines (former Chicago & Northwestern and Milwaukee Road lines) has been re-used as a signal bridge.

== Operations ==
=== Infrastructure and rolling stock ===
Prior to the 1894 decision to electrify its tracks, the Metropolitan had placed an order from the Baldwin Locomotive Works of Philadelphia for steam locomotives. After the decision, however, the order was modified to instead provide for electric "motor cars" and unpowered "trailers". Electric traction in the late 19th century and early 20th centuries was such that one motor car generally pulled multiple trailers. Humboldt Park trains were unusual in that their motor cars instead pushed their trailers onto Logan Square trains to be coupled for the trip downtown, except during rush hours when Humboldt Park trains went directly downtown or night hours when the trains were only one car each. The Metropolitan adopted multiple-unit control during 1904–1905, eliminating the need for Humboldt Park trains to push trailers onto Logan Square trains, although combining Logan Square and Humboldt Park trains at Damen continued in some form or another until 1950.

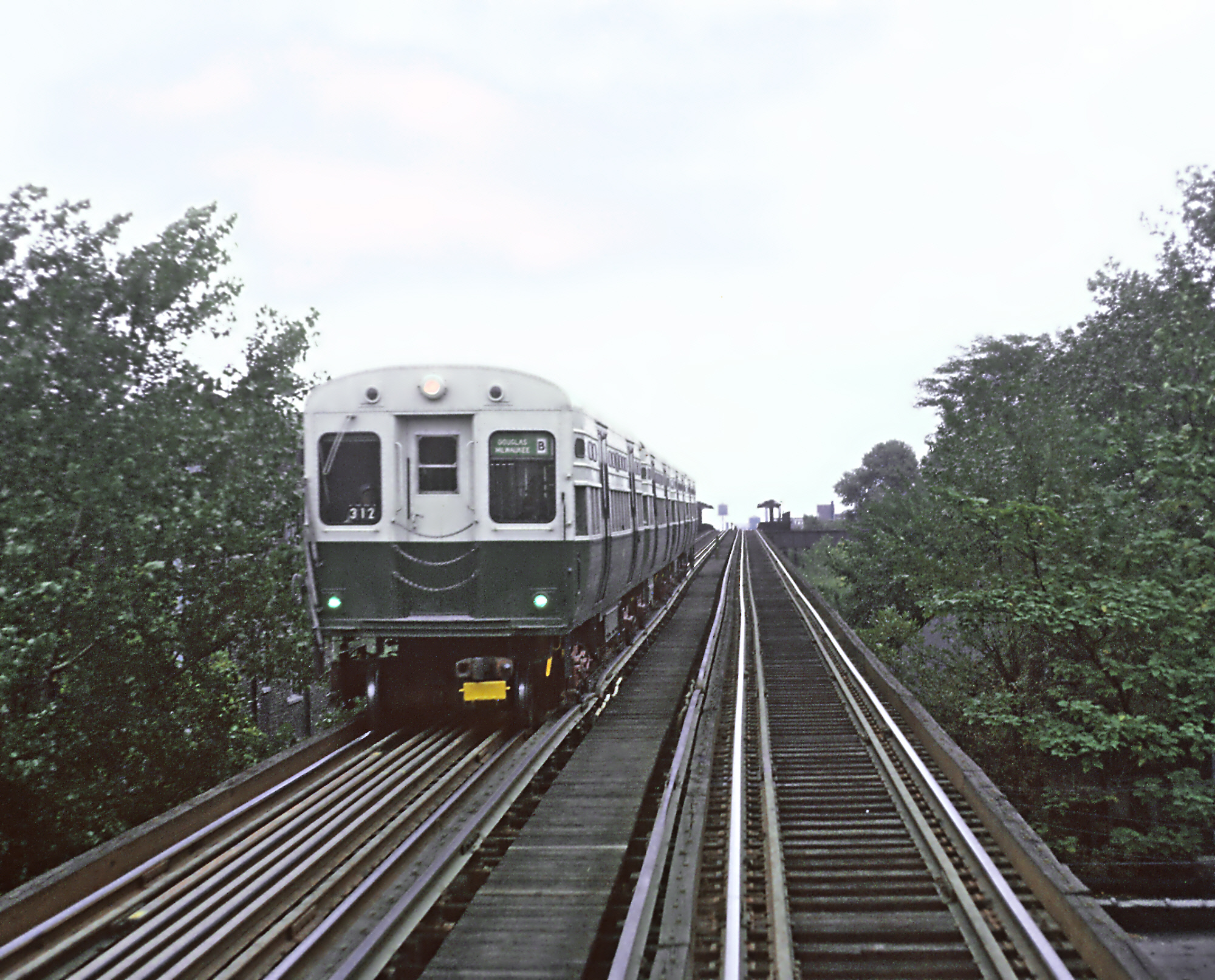
A 6000-series train on the Milwaukee line in 1966

In common with the other companies building what would become the Chicago "L", the Metropolitan provided wooden cars for its lines. The first trailers were built by the Pullman Car Company, whereas the first motor cars were built by Barney and Smith. Subsequent orders for trailers were built by Pullman, Harlan and Hollingsworth, and American Car and Foundry Company (ACF), and further motor car orders were fulfilled by Barney and Smith, Jewett, ACF, and Pullman. Wooden cars remained dominant in the "L" fleet throughout the first half of the 20th century. After the CER assumed operations, it placed two orders for steel-bodied cars from the Cincinnati Car Company in 1914 and 1924, known collectively as the "4000-series"; however, as late as 1949, only wooden cars were assigned to the Logan Square branch. When the first 6000-series were delivered in August 1950, they were placed on the Logan Square and Humboldt Park branches for trials in anticipation of the subway's opening. Given that only metal cars were allowed in the subways, most 6000-series were put into service on the branches.

=== Schedules and fares ===
As originally opened, the Metropolitan's trains ran every six minutes between 6 a.m. and 6:30 p.m., and every ten minutes during the night. The average speed was 16 mph (26 km/h), and trains took 22 minutes to go from Robey to Canal. Plans to eliminate owl service on the branch had been raised by early 1950, but was deferred until the opening of the subway.

The fare across the "L" was legally mandated to be a nickel (5 cents, $1.37 in 2021) in the late 19th and early 20th centuries. The nickel fare continued until temporarily increased by a cent to 6 cents in 1917 ($1.27 in 2021) before stabilizing to a dime in 1920 (10 cents, $1.35 in 2021). Starting in 1922, fares were usually marketed in packs of three rides for 25 cents, or 8 1/3 cents per ride ($1.35 per ride in 2021), but individual fares remained 10 cents each. At the same time, a weekly pass was introduced, the first in a major American city, for $1.25 ($20.24 in 2021) for rides outside of Evanston and Wilmette.

Unlike other elevated railroads at the time, the Metropolitan did not sell tickets for passengers to present to staff; instead customers gave their nickel to the station agent to record in a registry, a practice similar to streetcars at the time. This practice was ultimately adopted by the other elevateds. As late as 1960, after the original Logan Square branch was supplanted, there was no fare control at Damen besides the station agent. Originally, station agents were on duty 24 hours a day; conductors were introduced on the Logan Square, Humboldt Park, and Northwest branches to instead collect fares on trains during night and off-peak hours in 1931 and remained in use through 1937, although the Northwest branch regained 24-hour station agents in 1935.

=== Ridership ===
From 1900 through 1903, Robey was the highest-ridership station both on the Northwest branch and the entire Logan Square branch; in that same time, Western was the busiest station on the Logan Square branch proper in 1900 before being surpassed by the Logan Square terminal from 1901. Starting in 1904 the Logan Square terminal would surpass Robey to be the busiest station on the combined branch every year, but Robey would continue to lead the Northwest branch every year through 1945 and again in 1948, being beaten by Chicago for 1946 and 1947. The Northwest branch's ridership peaked in 1900 at 4,844,510 riders, compared to a 1926 peak of the Logan Square branch proper at 5,514,791 passengers. Prior to 1937, ridership figures for the Lake Street Transfer were counted separately between the Metropolitan and Lake Street Divisions, while afterwards they were all recorded under the Metropolitan. Including only the Metropolitan's riders prior to that year, the station at Lake Street would be the lowest-ridership station on the Northwest and combined branches every year through 1936; however, combining its figures with that of the Lake Street's portion of the Transfer after 1913, the least-patronized station on the Northwest and combined branches becomes Madison in 1913 and Grand every year thereafter, including after 1937. The lowest-ridership station on the Logan Square branch proper was the Logan Square terminal in 1900 and Western in all subsequent years.

== Stations ==
Station	Location	Opened	Closed	Points of interest and notes
Logan Square	Kedzie Boulevard and Linden Place	May 25, 1895	1970; demolished	Replaced by the Logan Square subway station
California	California Avenue and Lyndale Street	May 25, 1895		
Western	Western Avenue, Cortland Street and Milwaukee Avenue	May 25, 1895		
Damen	Damen Avenue, North Avenue and Milwaukee Avenue	May 6, 1895	Opened as "Robey"	Transfer to Humboldt Park Branch
Division	Division Street and Paulina Street	May 6, 1895	February 25, 1951	
Chicago	Chicago Avenue and Paulina Street	May 6, 1895	February 25, 1951	
Grand	Grand Avenue and Paulina Street	May 6, 1895	February 25, 1951	
Lake Street Transfer	Lake Street and Paulina Street	May 6, 1895	February 25, 1951	Opened as "Lake." Transfer to Lake Street.
Madison	1720 W. Madison Street	May 6, 1895	February 25, 1951	

== Works cited ==
- Borzo, Greg (2007). The Chicago "L". Arcadia. ISBN 9780738551005 – via Google Books.
- Department of Subways and Traction (1939). A Comprehensive Plan for the Extension of the Subway System of the City of Chicago. Chicago: City of Chicago – via Internet Archive.
- Chicago Transit Authority (1951). Seventh Annual Report of Chicago Transit Board for the Fiscal Year ended December 31, 1951 – via Archive.org.
- Chicago Transit Board (1954). Tenth Annual Report for the Fiscal Year ended December 31, 1954 – via Archive.org.
- Public Information Department (1967). Congress Rapid Transit. Chicago: Chicago Transit Authority.
- CTA Rail Entrance, Annual Traffic, 1900–1979 (Report). Chicago: Chicago Transit Authority. October 1, 1979.
- Moffat, Bruce G. (1995). The "L": The Development of Chicago's Rapid Transit System, 1888–1932. Chicago: Central Electric Railfans' Association. ISBN 0-915348-30-6.
- "The Metropolitan West Side Elevated Railroad of Chicago". The Street Railway Review. 5: 263–274. January 15, 1895.
