= Chicago station (CTA Logan Square branch) =

Rapid transit station in Chicago, 1895–1951

CHICAGO 800N 1700W
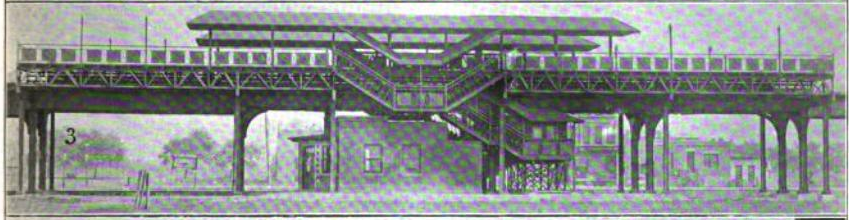
- Typical station on the Metropolitan's double-tracked lines, of which Chicago was an example

General information
- Coordinates: 41°53′46″N 87°40′13″W
- Owner: Chicago Transit Authority (1947–1951); Chicago Rapid Transit Company (1924–1947); See text before 1924
- Line: Logan Square branch
- Platforms: 2 side platforms
- Tracks: 2

Construction
- Structure type: Elevated

History
- Opened: May 6, 1895; 131 years ago
- Closed: February 25, 1951; 75 years ago

Passengers
- 1948: 387,603 ▼15.93% (CTA)
- Rank: 115 out of 223

Former services
Preceding station	Chicago "L"	Following station
Division toward Logan Square	Logan Square branch	Grand toward Marshfield
Location

Chicago was a rapid transit station on the Logan Square branch of the Chicago "L", one of the several branches of the Metropolitan West Side Elevated Railroad, between 1895 and 1951. Located on Chicago Avenue, the station was constructed by the Metropolitan in the early 1890s and began service on May 6, 1895.

The Metropolitan, one of four companies that would build what became the Chicago "L", had many branches to serve Chicago's west side, including the Logan Square branch on which Chicago lay. With some interruptions and financial issues, it operated these lines until 1911, when it handed operations to the Chicago Elevated Railways (CER) trust, and formally merged into the Chicago Rapid Transit Company (CRT) in 1924. The "L" was taken over by the publicly-held Chicago Transit Authority (CTA) in 1947.

A subway had been planned since the late 1930s to reach downtown in a more direct way than the portion of the Logan Square branch where Chicago was located. This subway was originally intended to supplement the old elevated Logan Square branch, but the CTA sought to simplify its routing and saw no need for the old branch's continued existence. The subway opened on February 25, 1951, with a station of its own on Chicago Avenue; the old Chicago station was then closed along with the others on the affected part of the branch. The station and its trackage remained in non-revenue service until it was demolished and the property sold off in 1964. A commercial building built by the CRT across the street from the station survives as of 2023, however, and has a low profile that marks where the "L" once passed above it.

Chicago was typical of the Metropolitan's stations, with two wooden side platforms and a brick station house at street level. For most of its existence it connected with a streetcar route that reached Lake Shore Drive; both the "L" and streetcar had owl service.

== History ==
The Metropolitan West Side Elevated Railroad Company was granted a 50-year franchise by the Chicago City Council on April 7, 1892, and began securing right of way shortly thereafter. As designed, the Metropolitan's operations would comprise a main line that went west from the Loop to Marshfield, where three branches – one northwest to Logan Square, one due west to Garfield Park, and one southwest to Douglas Park – would diverge and serve various parts of Chicago's west side. A further branch to Humboldt Park would proceed due west from the Logan Square branch just past Robey station. (Note: Technically, the Logan Square branch started after Robey and was, like the Humboldt Park branch, a divergence from what was formally known as the "Northwest branch". However, as early as 1898, even the Metropolitan itself was referring to the Northwest branch as part of the "Logan Square branch".) Unlike the competing South Side and Lake Street Elevateds, the Metropolitan never used steam traction; although it had originally intended to, and indeed had built much of its structure under the assumption that locomotives would be used, it decided in May 1894 to have electrified tracks instead, making it upon its opening the first electric elevated railroad in the United States. The Metropolitan's tracks on the Logan Square branch were finished by the middle of October 1894, and were powered on in April 1895 for test and inspection runs. The Metropolitan began service at 6 a.m. on Monday, May 6, 1895, between Robey on the Logan Square branch and Canal on the main line. Eleven stations opened that day, one of which was on Chicago Avenue.

The Metropolitan's lines were originally operated by the West Side Construction Company, which had been responsible for constructing them, and would be transferred to the Metropolitan on October 6, 1896. The backers and officers of the two companies were largely identical, however, so this transfer of ownership was nominal. The expenses incurred in constructing the Metropolitan's vast trackage would catch up to the company, which entered receivership in 1897; the similarly-named Metropolitan West Side Elevated Railway Company was organized in January 1899 and assumed operations on February 3 of that year. The new Metropolitan, along with the other companies operating "L" lines in Chicago, became a part of the Chicago Elevated Railways (CER) trust on July 1, 1911. CER acted as a de facto holding company for the "L" – unifying its operations, instituting the same management across the companies, and instituting free transfers between the lines starting in 1913 – but kept the underlying companies intact. This continued until the companies were formally merged into the single Chicago Rapid Transit Company (CRT) in 1924, which assumed operations on January 9; the former Metropolitan was designated the Metropolitan Division of the CRT for administrative purposes. Although municipal ownership of transit had been a hotly-contested issue for half a century, the publicly-owned Chicago Transit Authority (CTA) would not be created until 1945, or assume operation of the "L" until October 1, 1947.

=== Closure and demolition ===
Plans for Chicago to have a subway system to relieve the severe congestion of, if not replace, its elevated trackage dated back to the early 20th century, but the city lagged in building subways. Chicago petitioned the Public Works Administration (PWA) for construction funds for a subway on State Street in 1937. Originally included in the petition was a proposal for two downtown east-west streetcar tunnels. Harold L. Ickes, the administrator of the PWA and a longtime Chicagoan, vetoed the streetcar tunnel plan and insisted instead on a second subway that would go under Dearborn Street and Milwaukee Avenue, which would provide a more direct route from Logan Square to downtown. Although this idea engendered considerable local opposition, especially from mayor Edward Joseph Kelly, Ickes's influence in the federal government led to the Dearborn plan being adopted in 1938.

The subway's approval did not immediately imply the end of the old Logan Square branch; plans in 1939 included another proposed subway to connect the branch with the Ravenswood branch to the north and through-routing it with the Douglas Park branch to the south into a subway on Ashland Avenue to form a crosstown route. Damen Tower, serving the Humboldt Park branch divergence, was rebuilt with the expectation that it also would switch trains between the subway and the elevated, in the same manner as the State Street subway supplementing the earlier elevated North Side main line, and as late as 1949 commuters were promised such a setup that would have preserved the old Logan Square trackage. However, the CTA had no interest in operating either the old Logan Square elevated or the Humboldt Park branch; the new Damen Tower would never be installed with switching equipment, and the Logan Square branch south of Damen would be closed after the subway opened.

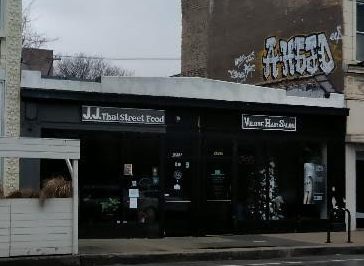
A commercial building across the street from where the Chicago station once stood; constructed by the CRT, its short stature in contrast to its surroundings reveals the one-time location of the Logan Square branch's tracks.

World War II interrupted the construction of the subway; although the federal government allowed the continued construction of the State Street subway, it did not do so for the Dearborn subway despite its being 82 percent complete in 1942. After the war ended, work resumed on the Dearborn subway and it opened at midnight Sunday, February 25, 1951. The subway was predicted to reduce the travel time between Logan Square and downtown from 28 minutes to 15. Since construction had not started on the Congress Line, trains in the subway turned back at its southern terminus at LaSalle. Despite this incomplete state, and complaints from riders no longer given a direct trip to the Near West Side, the new subway had over 60 percent higher ridership than the old Logan Square branch by the end of the year. The subway contains a station of its own on Chicago Avenue.

The old Logan Square branch trackage south of its entrance to the subway became known as the Paulina Connector, connecting the branch with the rest of the "L" system now that it no longer had revenue service to the Loop. Wooden parts from the old stations on the Connector, including Chicago, were removed to reduce fire hazards, as were the lowest flights of stairs to deter trespassing. North of Washington Junction, the old northbound track was removed in 1957 while the southbound track continued non-revenue operations. The portion of the Connector north of Kinzie Street, including where Division, Chicago, and Grand stations stood, was demolished in 1964 and the right of way sold to adjacent landowners. A commercial building was constructed by the CRT underneath the "L"'s right of way across the street from where the Chicago station stood. This building still survives, and retains its short profile to reflect its placement underneath the "L" tracks.

== Station details ==
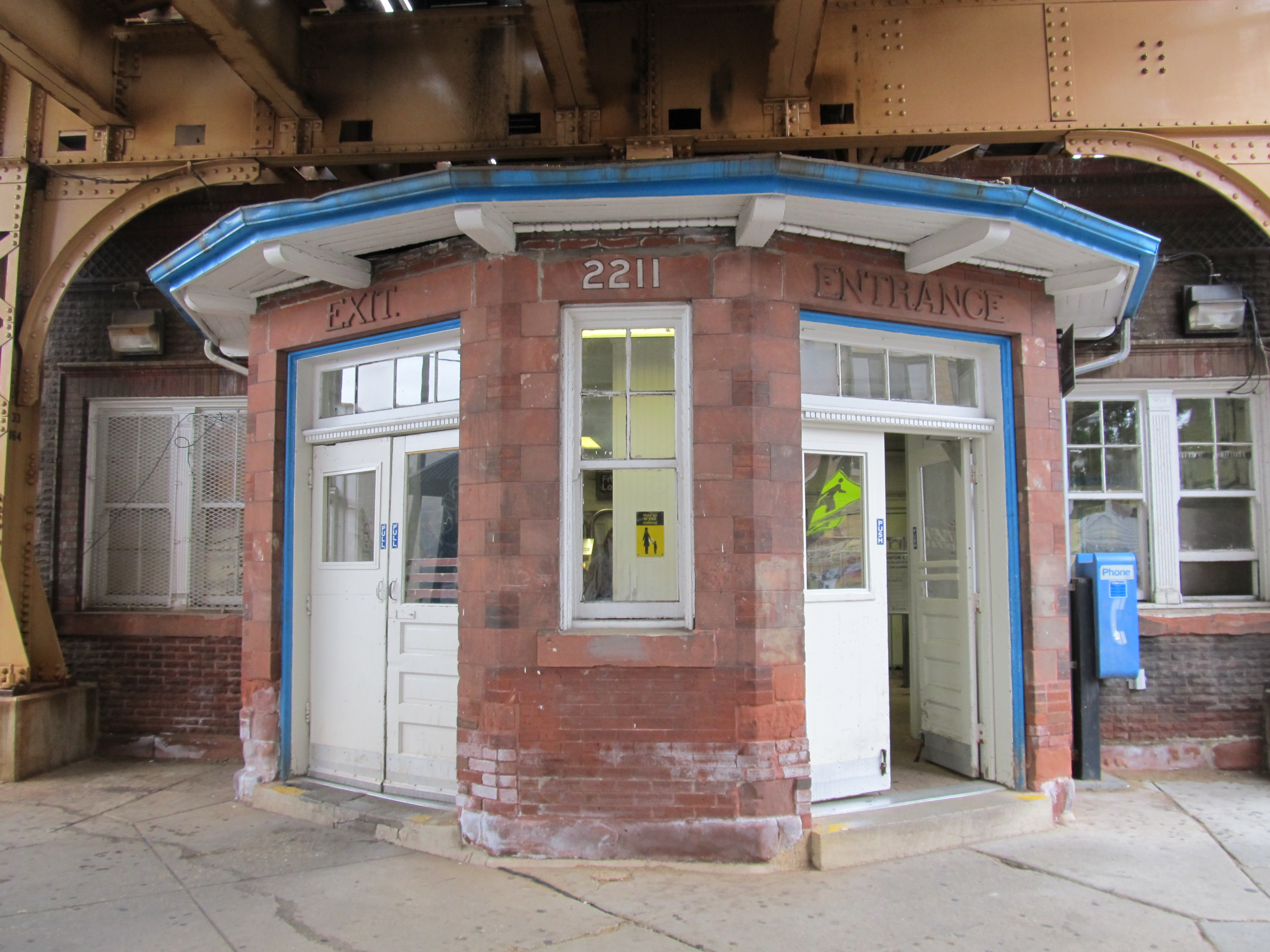
The station house at California in 2011; Chicago's station house was of a similar design.

Chicago had two wooden side platforms at its tracks and a station house at street level. The station house, made of red pressed brick and white limestone trim with a stone sill and foundation, was designed similarly to other stations on the Logan Square branch, surviving examples of which are at California and Damen. It had a corniced and dentiled front bay containing dual doors specifically marked "Entrance" and "Exit" and prolific use of terra cotta. Its platforms had hipped roof tin canopies in the center and decorative cast-iron railings with diamond designs. Unlike elsewhere on the "L", station houses on the Metropolitan had central heating and a basement. The Metropolitan's tracks and stations were constructed by the West Side Construction Company, a company with the same officers as the Metropolitan itself and the chief engineer of E. W. Elliot, with steel and iron from the Carnegie Steel Company.

=== Operations and connections ===
As originally opened, the Metropolitan's trains ran every six minutes between 6 a.m. and 6:30 p.m., and every ten minutes during the night; the average speed was 16 mph (26 km/h). Unlike the Lake Street Elevated, which offered smoking and non-smoking cars, all of the Metropolitan's cars allowed smoking. Smoking was banned by the city across the "L" and in streetcars in response to a 1918 influenza outbreak, a prohibition that has remained in force ever since.

The fare across the "L" was legally mandated to be a nickel (5 cents, $1.37 in 2021) in the late 19th and early 20th centuries. This fare continued until temporarily increased by a cent to $0.06 ($1.27 in 2021) in 1917 before stabilizing to a dime (10 cents, $1.35 in 2021) in 1920. Starting in 1922, fares were usually marketed in packs of three for 25 cents, or 8 1/3 cents per ride ($1.35 in 2021), but individual fares remained 10 cents each. At the same time, a weekly pass was introduced, the first in a major American city, for $1.25 ($20.24 in 2021) for rides outside of Evanston and Wilmette. Fare control was usually by a station agent posted 24 hours a day, but conductors were used instead during night and off-peak hours from 1931 to 1934, and during 1936 and 1937.

As of 1915, Chicago Avenue had two streetcar lines, both serving the station: one went westbound from Lake Shore Drive to California Avenue, and the other went eastbound from Austin Avenue to downtown via Milwaukee Avenue. On March 11, 1918, the downtown route came south via Wells Street rather than Milwaukee, though this did not affect the station. As part of an overhaul of streetcar service by operator Chicago Surface Lines on September 14, 1924, these two lines were consolidated to one and the downtown route was discontinued, although streetcars bound for downtown from Halsted Street turned onto Chicago rather than Madison Street as part of the same plan. As of 1928, the Chicago route had owl service between 1:05 and 5:18 a.m., serving cars that varied between 8-, 10-, and 15-minute intervals, increasing headways further into the night. During the day, streetcars in Chicago typically had intervals ranging between eight and fifteen minutes. "One-man cars", without a separate conductor, entered service on June 24, 1950; after the station was abandoned, streetcars were replaced by trolleybuses on May 11, 1952. Streetcars were typically one car each in Chicago; two-car streetcars ran on the route between October 13, 1924, and February 1, 1925, and again between December 18, 1926, and November 1, 1929, both times with multiple-unit control.

=== Ridership ===
In 1948, the last year records are available, Chicago served 387,603 passengers, a 15.93 percent decrease from the 461,031 riders of 1947. In 1948, it was the 115th-most ridden of the 223 stations on the Chicago "L" at the beginning of the year where ridership was recorded; in 1947, it had been the 103rd-most ridden of 222 such stations. (Note: Several stations on the Niles Center and Westchester branches were permanently unstaffed and thus did not collect ridership statistics. Several stations closed on the "L" during 1948. Exchange station on the Stock Yards branch discontinued statistics after 1946, but adjacent Racine station began collecting them in 1948.)

== Works cited ==
- "The Metropolitan West Side Elevated Railroad of Chicago". The Street Railway Review. 5: 263–274. January 15, 1895.
- Department of Subways and Traction (1939). A Comprehensive Plan for the Extension of the Subway System of the City of Chicago. City of Chicago – via Internet Archive.
- Borzo, Greg (2007). The Chicago "L". Arcadia. ISBN 9780738551005 – via Google Books.
- Chicago Transit Authority (1951). Seventh Annual Report of Chicago Transit Board for the Fiscal Year ended December 31, 1951 – via Internet Archive.
- Chicago Transit Board (1954). Tenth Annual Report for the Fiscal Year ended December 31, 1954 – via Internet Archive.
- Public Information Department (1967). Congress Rapid Transit. Chicago: Chicago Transit Authority – via Internet Archive.
- CTA Rail Entrance, Annual Traffic, 1900–1979 (Report). Chicago: Chicago Transit Authority. October 1, 1979.
- Lind, Alan R. (1974). Chicago Surface Lines: An Illustrated History. Park Forest, Illinois: Transport History Press.
- Moffat, Bruce G. (1995). The "L": The Development of Chicago's Rapid Transit System, 1888–1932. Chicago: Central Electric Railfans' Association. ISBN 0-915348-30-6.
