= Damen station (CTA Blue Line) =

Rapid transit station in Chicago

Damen 2000W 1600N
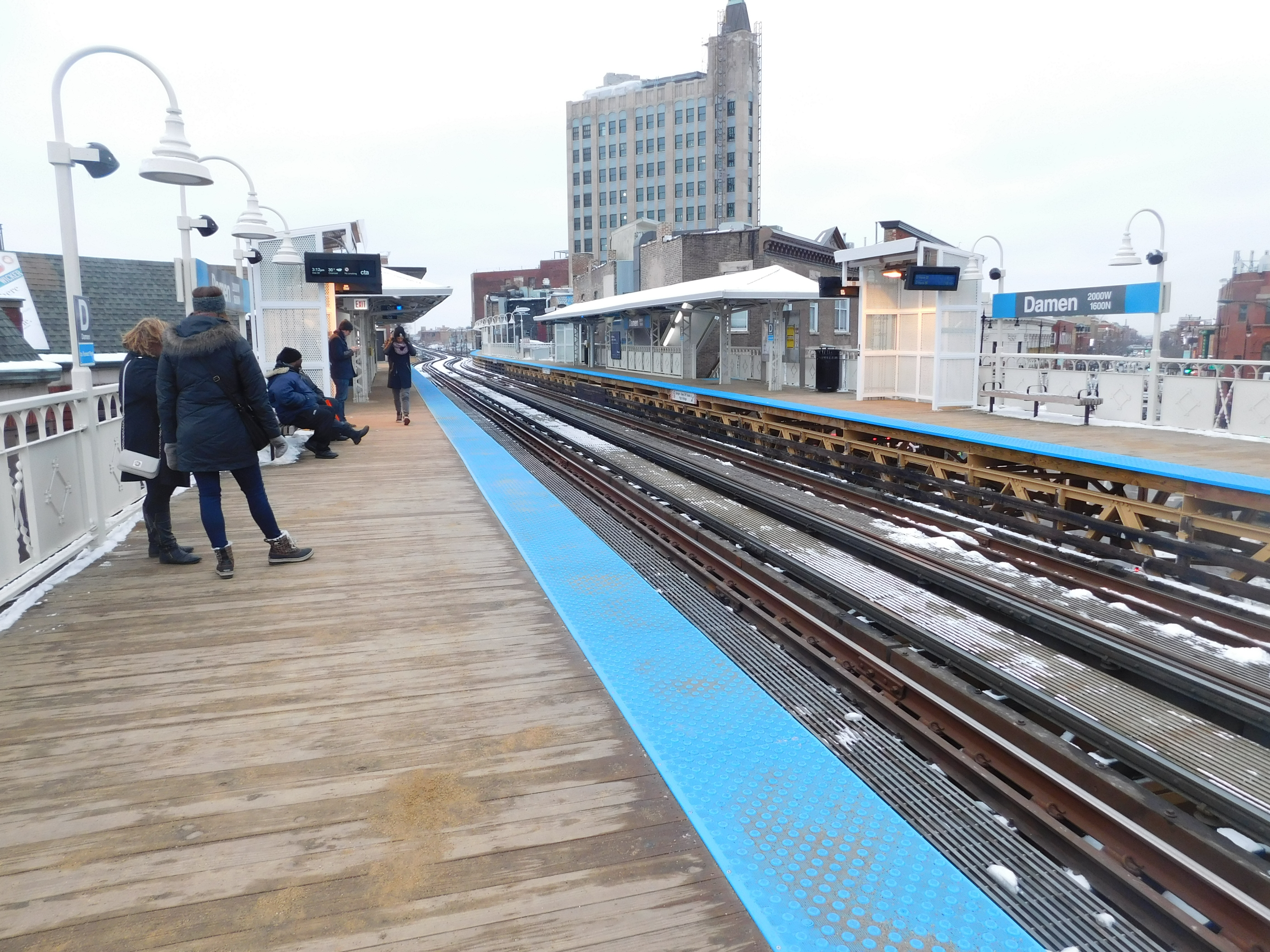

General information
- Location: 1558 North Damen Avenue; Chicago, Illinois 60622
- Coordinates: 41°54′35″N 87°40′39″W
- Owner: Chicago Transit Authority
- Line: Logan Square branch (O'Hare Branch)
- Platforms: 2 side platforms
- Tracks: 2
- Connections: CTA buses 50 56 72

Construction
- Structure type: Elevated
- Cycle facilities: Yes
- Accessible: No

Other information
- Website: www.transitchicago.com/station/damo/

History
- Opened: May 6, 1895; 131 years ago
- Rebuilt: 2014; 12 years ago
- Former names: Robey (before 1927)

Passengers
- 2025: 1,411,006 ▲15.1%

Services
Preceding station	Chicago "L"	Following station
Western toward O'Hare	Blue Line	Division toward Forest Park
Former services
Preceding station	Chicago "L"	Following station
Western toward Logan Square	Logan Square branch	Division Closed 1951 toward Marshfield
Western Closed 1952 toward Lawndale	Humboldt Park branch	through to Logan Square branch (pre-1951) or Terminus (1951-1952)
Track layout
Location

Damen is a rapid transit station on the Chicago "L", serving the O'Hare branch of the Blue Line. Opened on May 6, 1895, as Robey, it is the oldest station on the Blue Line and one of the few surviving stations originally built for the Metropolitan West Side Elevated Railroad. The station serves the popular Bucktown and Wicker Park neighborhoods, and is consistently in the top 40 highest-ridership "L" stations. It has two wooden side platforms and a brick station house at street level. The west platform, serving southbound trains, contains a tower that has never been used but is a relic of the station's past. The station is served by three bus routes on Damen, Milwaukee, and North Avenues, which are each descended from streetcar lines on those streets in the early 20th century. The Blue Line has owl service; while the surrounding streetcar lines also had owl service in the early 20th century, the modern bus services do not.

Robey was constructed by the Metropolitan West Side Elevated Railroad to serve its Logan Square and Humboldt Park branches, being the last stop on the Logan Square branch before the Humboldt Park branch diverged from it. The Metropolitan's operations, along with the rest of the "L", were assumed by the private Chicago Rapid Transit Company in 1924 and the public Chicago Transit Authority in 1947. The rail lines that had been constructed by the Metropolitan were significantly altered in the 1950s, a process that entailed the closure of the Humboldt Park branch and the replacement of the Logan Square branch south of Damen with the Milwaukee–Dearborn subway. By 1958, this had created the "West-Northwest Route", which was renamed the Blue Line in 1992. The Logan Square branch, renamed the "Milwaukee branch" during this process, was extended to O'Hare International Airport in 1984, forming the O'Hare branch.

Throughout these changes, the Damen station itself remained remarkably well-preserved, being among other things one of the last stations on the "L" system to retain its historic gooseneck lights. Having contributed to the neighborhood's historical development, the station is a contributing property to the Chicago landmarked Milwaukee Avenue District, although it is not itself landmarked. After suffering a decline in the mid-to-late 20th century, the station and neighborhood were in poor shape by the 1980s, though the station received a renovation for the 100th anniversary of its opening in 1995. The neighborhood and station's popularity increased in the early 21st century, leading to another renovation in 2014. Despite these renovations, the station remains limited in its accessibility for disabled patrons due to its advanced age and the neighborhood's protected status.

== History ==
Proposals for the construction of an elevated railroad above Milwaukee Avenue dated to at least 1872, although opposition existed from the public due to the feared impact on property values. The Metropolitan West Side Elevated Railroad Company was granted a 50-year franchise by the Chicago City Council on April 7, 1892, and began securing right of way shortly thereafter. The Metropolitan's operations comprised a main line that went west from downtown to Marshfield Junction, where three branches – one northwest to Logan Square, one due west to Garfield Park, and one southwest to Douglas Park – diverged and served various parts of Chicago's west side. A further branch to Humboldt Park proceeded due west from the Logan Square branch just past Robey Street. (Note: Technically, the Logan Square branch started after Robey and was, like the Humboldt Park branch, a divergence from what was formally known as the "Northwest branch". However, as early as 1898, even the Metropolitan itself was referring to the Northwest branch as part of the "Logan Square branch", although ridership statistics continued to separate them.) Unlike the competing South Side and Lake Street Elevateds, the Metropolitan never used steam traction. Although it had originally intended to, and indeed had built much of its structure under the assumption that locomotives would be used, it decided in May 1894 to have electrified tracks instead, making it the first revenue electric elevated railroad in the United States.

The Metropolitan's tracks by the site of the future Robey station were finished by the middle of October 1894, and were given power in April 1895 for test and inspection runs. Public opposition led to this part of the elevated being placed above an alley adjacent to Milwaukee Avenue rather than the avenue itself. The Metropolitan began service at 6 a.m. on Monday, May 6, 1895, between Robey on the Logan Square branch and Canal on the main line. Of the eleven stations opened that day, Robey is the only one still surviving, making it the oldest station on what is now the Blue Line. (Note: The remaining stations closed at various times between the 1951 opening of the subway and the 1958 opening of the Congress Line.) The Logan Square branch was extended to Logan Square on May 25, and the Humboldt Park branch opened on July 29. Robey Street, on which the station lay and named for politician James Robey, was renamed Damen Avenue in 1927 for Father Arnold Damen, leading to a change in the station's name.

The Metropolitan's lines were originally operated by the West Side Construction Company, which had been responsible for constructing them, and were transferred to the Metropolitan on October 6, 1896. The backers and officers of the two companies were largely identical, however, so this transfer of ownership was nominal. The expenses incurred in constructing the Metropolitan's vast trackage would catch up to the company, which entered receivership in 1897; the similarly-named Metropolitan West Side Elevated Railway Company was organized in January 1899 and assumed operations on February 3 of that year. The new Metropolitan, along with the other companies operating "L" lines in Chicago, became a part of the Chicago Elevated Railways (CER) trust on July 1, 1911. CER acted as a de facto holding company for the "L" – unifying its operations, instituting the same management across the companies, and instituting free transfers between the lines starting in 1913 – but kept the underlying companies intact. This continued until the companies were formally merged into the single Chicago Rapid Transit Company (CRT) in 1924, which assumed operations on January 9; the former Metropolitan was designated the Metropolitan division of the CRT for administrative purposes. Although municipal ownership of transit had been a hotly-contested issue for half a century, the publicly-owned Chicago Transit Authority (CTA) was created only in 1945, assuming operation of the "L" on October 1, 1947.

Damen's services before and after the 1950s. The station is represented by a blue marker. The Logan Square and Humboldt Park branches, and Metropolitan main line and Wells Street Terminal, prior to 1951 The Loop, to which Damen connected prior to 1951 The modern-day Blue Line, the descendant of the post-1958 "West–Northwest Route" Other Metropolitan branches are not depicted.

The CTA instituted major changes on the lines built by the Metropolitan that had been planned since the late 1930s. The Logan Square branch south of Damen was replaced by the Milwaukee–Dearborn subway, which opened on February 25, 1951. Upon the subway's opening, the CTA restricted the Humboldt Park branch to a shuttle service to and from Damen, and closed it altogether on May 5, 1952. Combined with the replacement of the main line and Garfield Park branch with the Congress Line in 1958, this formed a new route called the "West–Northwest Route", which entered service on June 22, 1958. This route was renamed the Blue Line in 1992. Skip-stop, where certain "A" and "B" trains stopped at respective "A" and "B" stations, was instituted with the 1951 opening of the subway; Damen was deemed an "all-stop" station and was thus unaffected by this introduction. The Logan Square branch, referred to by the CTA as the "Milwaukee branch" after the completion of the West–Northwest Route, was extended past Logan Square to Jefferson Park on February 1, 1970. Further extensions were made to River Road in 1983 and finally a station at O'Hare International Airport on September 3, 1984, forming the O'Hare branch.

The Damen station remained remarkably well-preserved throughout the 20th century and the early 21st century. Prominent in this were the station's historic gooseneck lights; alongside Wilson, it was one of the last stations on the "L" to retain such lights. Having been credited with spurring development of the surrounding neighborhood upon its construction, the station was included as a contributing property to the "Milwaukee Avenue District", which was designated a Chicago landmark on April 9, 2008. The station was not itself made a landmark; nevertheless, the CTA has presented the landmarked status of its surroundings, and the station's general historic fabric, as part of the excessive difficulty in making the station accessible for disabled people.

=== Station renovations and rehabilitations ===
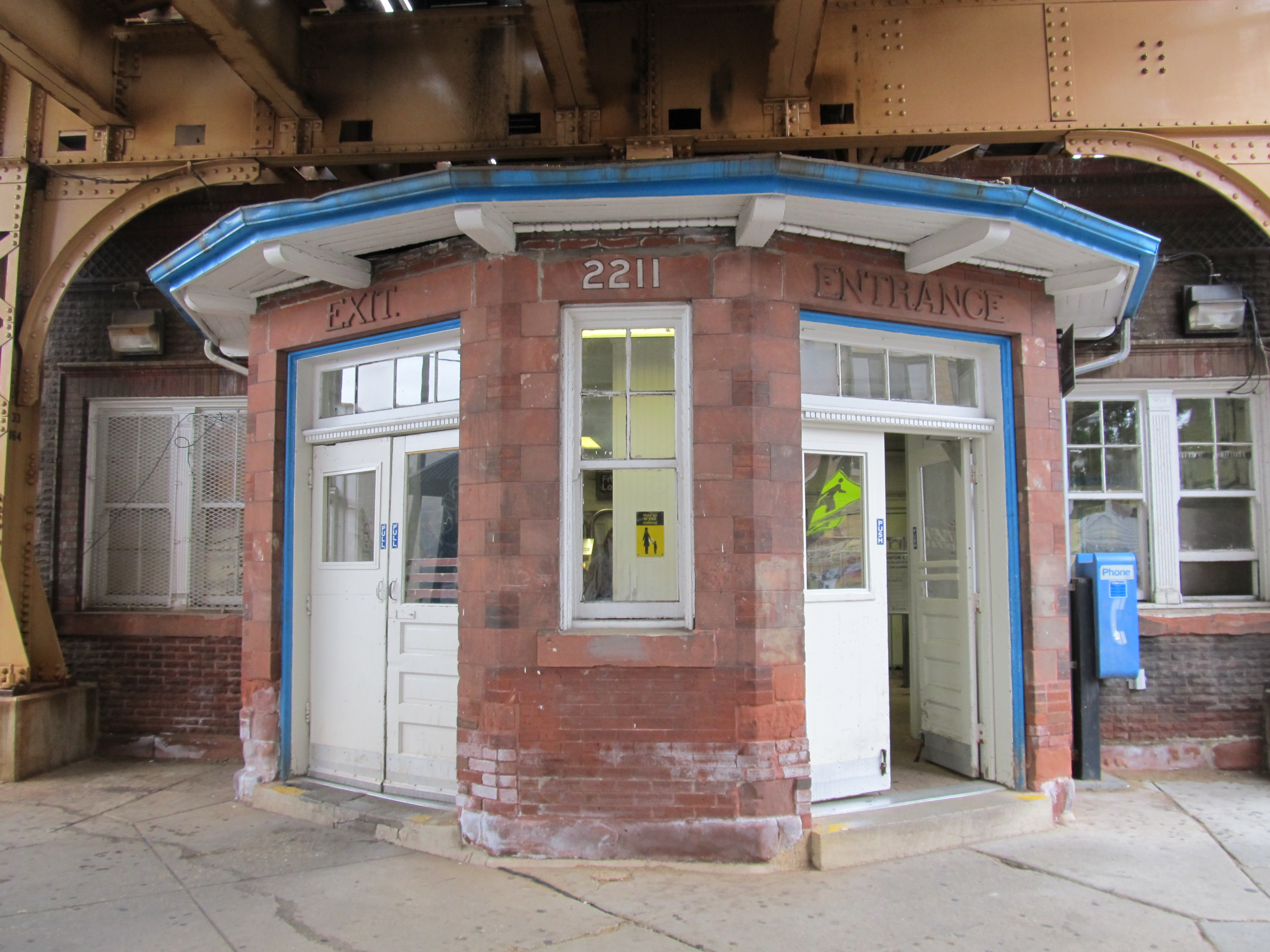
California's station house in 2011. Damen's station house was of a similar design until 1995.

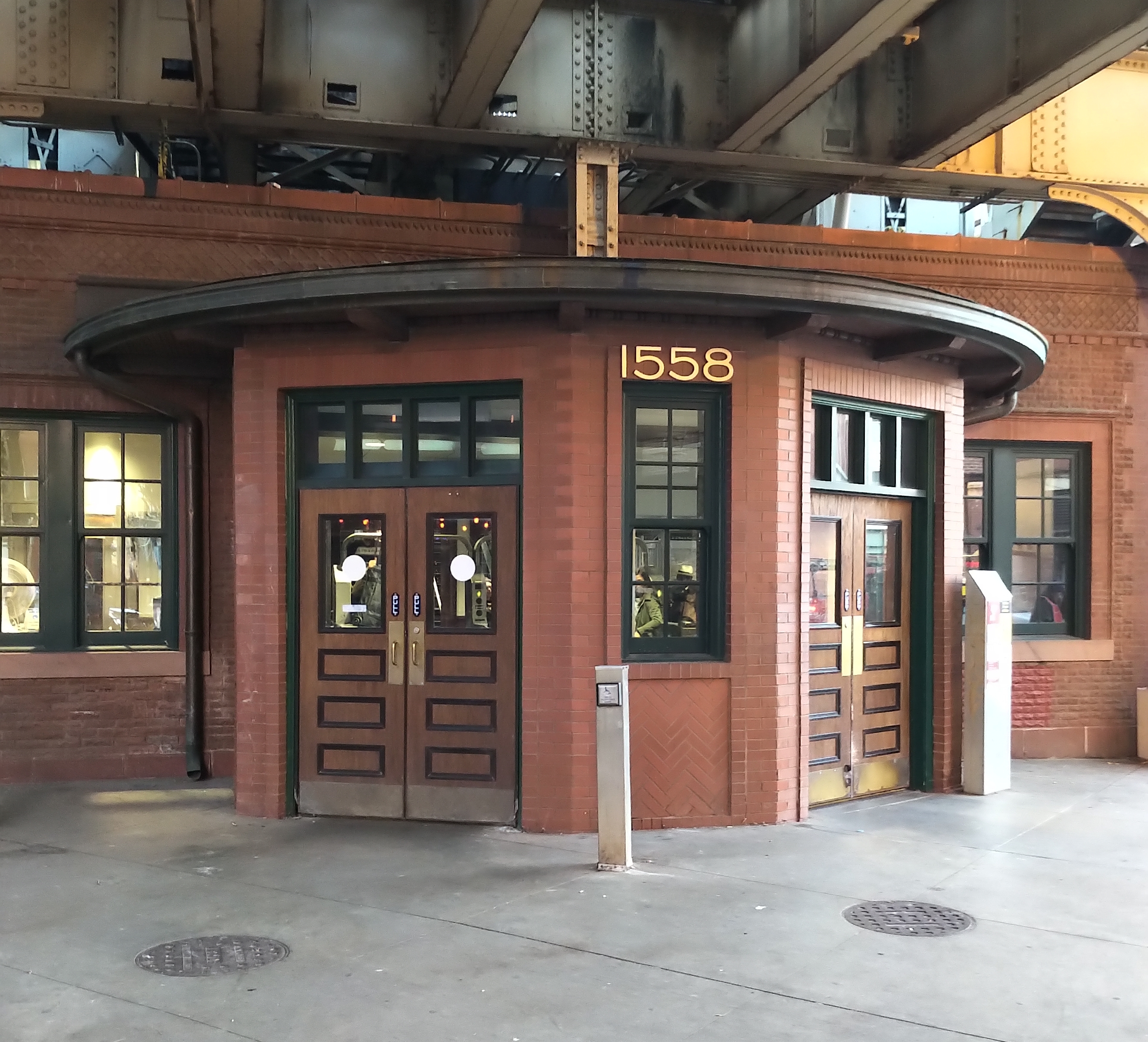
Damen's station house in 2022

Damen's platforms were extended to accommodate eight-car trains in the early 1930s, around the same time as other Metropolitan stations. Work on these platform extensions was begun in August 1930 and continued into 1931. A further extension of the northbound platform was built by the CTA in 1951, alongside an auxiliary exit onto North Avenue. By 1946, the southern (viewer's left) facade window of the station house had been replaced with a doorway containing two doors; these doors, which were likely added as a result of the station's high ridership, were disused and locked by 1970. Damen Tower was rebuilt in 1950, but various factors rendered the new tower superfluous upon its construction, and it was never equipped for use in switching. Around the same time, a crosswalk connecting the main platforms with a new single platform south of the Humboldt Park tracks was constructed for Humboldt Park riders, going through the new tower, and was used until the Humboldt Park branch's 1952 closure.

By 1985, Damen and its adjacent stations were singled out for being among the "L" stations in the worst repair, as well as some of the most dangerous. Damen was renovated for its 100th anniversary in 1995. The terra cotta elements of the station house's bay were removed and replaced with a more rustic appearance. In addition, the station house's interior was significantly overhauled, receiving new woodwork, having its fare control and agent's booth rearranged, and being furnished with pictures of the station's history. Much of the station's platform railings were replaced with simpler tubing in 1998, and the platforms' metalwork was restored and refurbished in late 2003. In 2011, most of the station's historic gooseneck lights were replaced by modern "shoebox" design light fixtures, although these fixtures were in turn replaced by reproductions of the original gooseneck lights in May 2012.

On December 22, 2014, Damen reopened after having been closed since October 20 for renovations, part of the CTA's $492 million (Note: equivalent to $669 million in 2025) "Your New Blue" project; Damen alone took $13.6 million (Note: equivalent to $18.5 million in 2025) to renovate, which combined with renovations to the California and Western stations totaled $25.6 million. (Note: equivalent to $34.8 million in 2025) The renovation entailed increasing room in the station house's interior and refurbishing it, augmenting cycling facilities, and replacing the roof. Signage was also updated, a wider turnstile was installed for strollers and luggage, the platforms and stairs were replaced, and modern gooseneck lights were used to replicate the originals. The reopening was celebrated by local restaurants and establishments offering discounts to commuters, and the station was remarked by alderman Joe Moreno as "a vital link for Chicago to the Wicker Park and Bucktown neighborhood[s] ... benefit[ing] from a modernized station." The renovation was contracted out to F. H. Paschen under the guidance of Matt Moss; much of the load-bearing masonry was found to be unusable and had to be replaced, but the work was still carried out on schedule. Also included in the renovations were the restoration of the southern facade window and the installation of blue tactile paving on the platforms' edges.

Concerns were raised for the accessibility of the station; no elevator access was added to the station despite its being the fourth-busiest station on the O'Hare branch. Locals expressed disappointment in the lack of accessibility; although wheelchair-using patrons were the most affected, the most common requests for an elevator came from tourists with large luggage. The CTA defended the lack of accessibility as a byproduct of the station's heritage and resultant difficulty of adding accessibility features, and offered the possibility of such improvements in the future.

== Station details ==
The station is located at 1558 North Damen Avenue, in the Wicker Park and Bucktown neighborhoods of Chicago.

=== Infrastructure and facilities ===
Damen has two wooden side platforms at track level and a station house at street level. The station house, made of red pressed brick and white limestone trim with a stone sill and foundation, was designed similarly to other stations on the Logan Square branch, with a corniced and dentiled front bay containing dual doors specifically marked "Entrance" and "Exit" and prolific use of terra cotta. The bay originally functioned as an antechamber, with doors on the interior into the station house as well as the exterior, but the interior doors were removed between 1960 and 1985. Unlike elsewhere on the "L", station houses on the Metropolitan had central heating and a basement. The station house is the only entrance to the station, but an auxiliary exit exists on the northbound platform going down onto North Avenue. The platforms have hipped roof tin canopies in the center and decorative cast-iron railings with diamond designs. Platform extensions were built at various points throughout the 20th century; these extensions have simpler railings than the older parts of the platforms. The Metropolitan's tracks and stations were constructed by the West Side Construction Company, with the chief engineer of E. W. Elliot and steel and iron from the Carnegie Steel Company.

The station house originally had a built-in newsstand, but by 1960 this was used for storage. A new concession area was installed by the 1980s. This stand, 80 sq ft (7.4 m^{2}) in area, had its tenant forced out in November 2012 as the CTA transitioned from month-to-month leasing to longer-term contracts. The stand remained vacant afterwards; a new tenant was secured in 2014 and would have opened in the summer of that year, but the CTA canceled such plans and decided to instead use the space to increase capacity for passengers in the renovation. The Metropolitan installed bicycle storage racks at its stations. Bicycle racks were added to the station's stairwell mezzanine in 2008, and were increased in the 2014 renovation. The 2014 renovation also added wider turnstiles for luggage and strollers, but did not include any accessibility improvements for riders with disabilities; as of 2022, the station remains ADA-inaccessible.

In 2018, an LED display named Soundtrack was installed on the bottom of the "L" tracks above Damen Avenue, comprising several panels that change color based on vibrations from passing trains and moving cars.

=== Operations ===
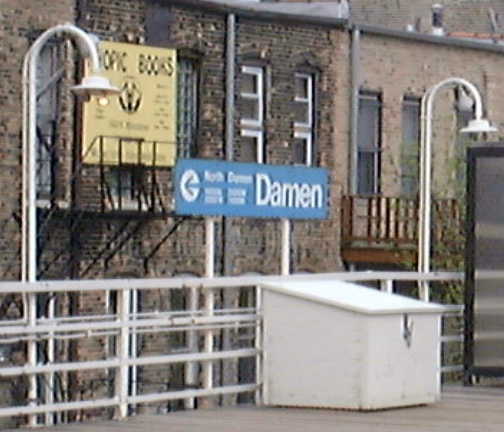
Damen's historic gooseneck lights in 2002. Damen was one of the last stations on the Chicago "L" to retain such lights.

As originally opened, the Metropolitan's trains ran every six minutes between 6 a.m. and 6:30 p.m., and every ten minutes during the night. The average speed was 16 mph (26 km/h), and trains took 22 minutes to go from Robey to Canal. By 1898, this was updated to running a train every thirty minutes for each Metropolitan branch, or every fifteen minutes on the combined Northwest branch, during night hours. The 1951 opening of the Milwaukee–Dearborn subway was projected to take 13 minutes off the travel time between Logan Square and downtown; as of 2022, trains take 14–15 minutes between Logan Square and Clark/Lake station downtown. As of 2022, trains run at intervals ranging from 3 to 10 minutes during weekday rush hours from Damen. The Blue Line has owl service, which serves Damen from 12:10 to 5:10 a.m. on weekdays and similar hours on weekends; during that time trains have intervals ranging from 10 to 30 minutes depending on the time of night.

The fare across the "L" was legally mandated to be a nickel (5 cents, equivalent to $1.63 in 2025) in the late 19th and early 20th centuries. The nickel fare continued until temporarily increased by a cent to 6 cents in 1917 (equivalent to $1.51 in 2025) before stabilizing to a dime in 1920 (10 cents, equivalent to $1.61 in 2025). Starting in 1922, fares were usually marketed in packs of three rides for 25 cents, or 8 1/3 cents per ride (equivalent to $1.6 in 2025 per ride), but individual fares remained 10 cents each. At the same time, a weekly pass was introduced, the first in a major American city, for $1.25 (equivalent to $24.04 in 2025). As of February 2023, the full fare for the "L" is $2.50, with a reduced fare of $1.25 and a student fare of 75 cents; passes are available, including a 7-day pass worth $20 and a 30-day pass worth $75.

Unlike other elevated railroads at the time, the Metropolitan did not sell tickets for passengers to present to staff; instead customers gave their nickel to the station agent to record in a registry, a practice similar to streetcars. This practice was ultimately adopted by the other elevateds. As late as 1960, there was no fare control at the station besides the station agent. Originally, station agents were on duty 24 hours a day; conductors were used on the Logan Square, Humboldt Park, and Northwest branches to instead collect fares on trains during night and off-peak hours from 1931 through 1937, except for the Northwest branch in 1935. They returned to the Milwaukee branch in 1950, and continued in use until 1995. Turnstiles were added to the station by 1985.

Unlike the competing Lake Street Elevated, which provided smoking cars at some times but not at others, all of the Metropolitan's motor cars originally allowed smoking. Smoking was banned by the city across "L" facilities and in streetcars in response to a 1918 influenza outbreak, a prohibition that has remained in force ever since.

=== Neighborhood and connections ===
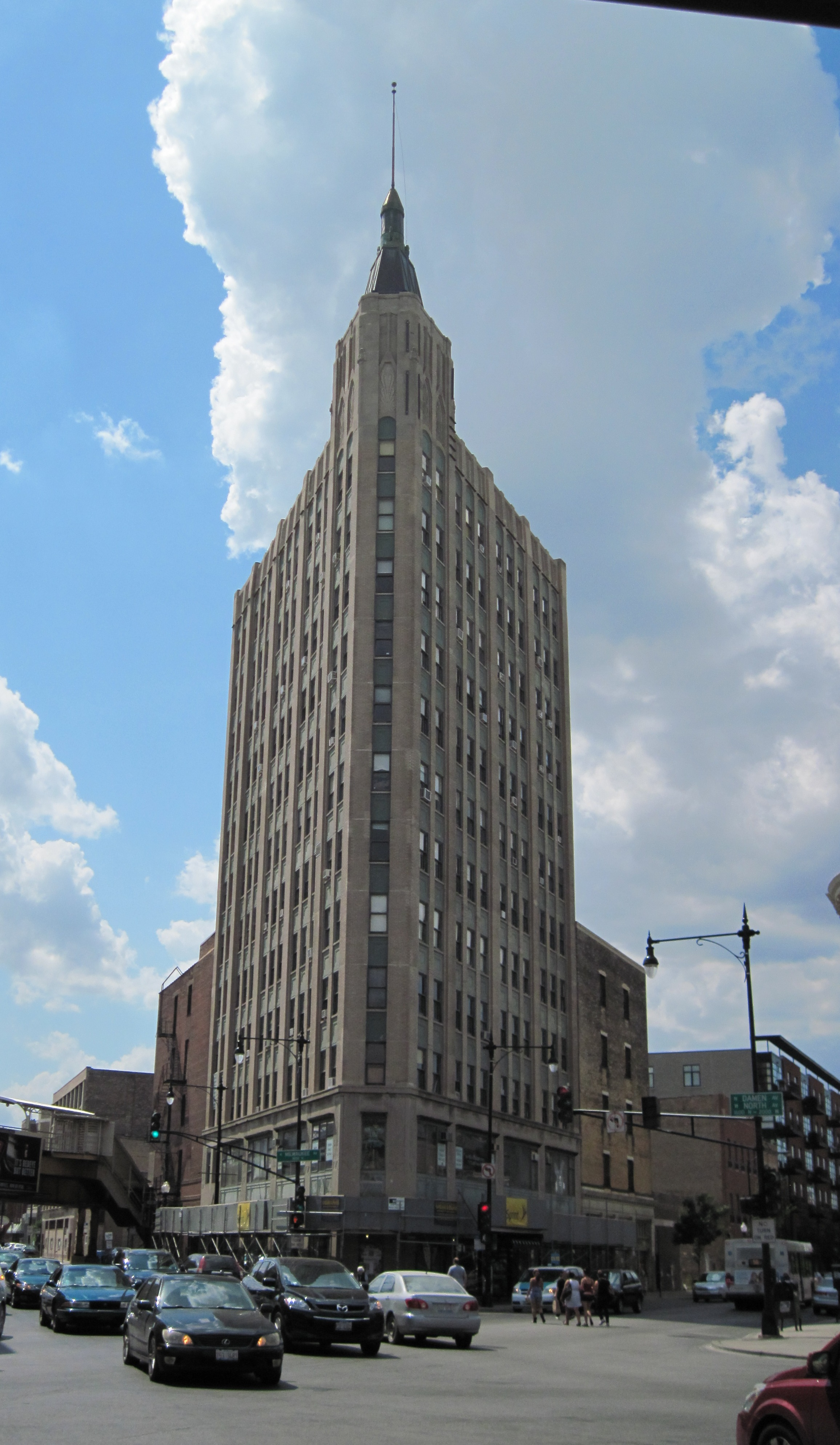
The Northwest Tower in 2012; Damen's auxiliary exit onto North Avenue is visible on the extreme left.

Milwaukee Avenue had been a bustling commercial district in the area since the 1870s, underpinning a community of German and Scandinavian immigrants. The construction of the "L" in the area, and Robey station in particular, has been said to have divided the "first" and "second phases" of development on the street, the first phase dating from the 1871 Great Chicago Fire and the second continuing until the Wall Street Crash of 1929. The "second phase" of development spurred on by the "L" allowed for businesses to diversify and specialize, such that the district was considered "a city within the city". Poles replaced Germans and Scandinavians starting in the 1890s, and Jews began to settle in the first decades of the 20th century. At the same time, middle-class skilled tradesmen gave way to a more working-class neighborhood. Nevertheless, property values on Milwaukee Avenue continued rising, doubling between 1911 and 1912. Banks and office buildings came in the interwar period, such as the 12-story Northwest Tower in 1928. Action was taken to ensure cleanliness and modernity of the district in 1927, which included streetlight improvements, the ban of sidewalk peddling, and the standardization of signage. The Great Depression and World War II interrupted the flow of immigrants to the area, causing it to decline. Revitalization started in the 1990s and Milwaukee Avenue is once again a busy shopping area.

As of 2022, Damen is served by the #50 Damen bus, the #56 Milwaukee bus, and the #72 North bus, each of which is a descendant of streetcar lines that ran starting in the late 19th and early 20th centuries. Horse cars, which had operated on Milwaukee Avenue intermittently since the 1850s and consistently since 1874, were upgraded to cable cars in 1890. These were, in turn, replaced by streetcars on August 19, 1906. Streetcars were typically one car each in Chicago; two-car multiple-unit control trains ran on Milwaukee between March 2, 1925 and May 5, 1929. As of 1928, the line had owl service between 1:05 and 5:35 a.m., wherein cars ran either every fifteen minutes or every thirty minutes depending on destination; during the day, streetcars in Chicago typically had intervals of eight to fifteen minutes. Buses replaced streetcars on weekends on October 28, 1951, and altogether on May 11, 1952. As of 2022, the #56 Milwaukee bus operates between 4:20 a.m. and 11:37 p.m. on weekdays and similar hours during the weekends and holidays, with intervals ranging from 6 to 25 minutes.

Robey Street had a streetcar line in the station's vicinity by 1910. By 1928, this route had owl service between 1:45 and 4:40 a.m., with a car running every thirty-five minutes in those hours. Buses replaced streetcars in the area on weekends starting December 12, 1948, and assumed the route at all times on May 13, 1951. As of 2022, the #50 Damen bus runs between 4:30 a.m. and 12:14 a.m. on weekdays and 5 a.m. and just after midnight during the weekends and holidays at 12- to 30-minute headways. North Avenue had a local streetcar route running in the area by June 26, 1911, when a downtown service was begun via North and Milwaukee. The downtown service was discontinued on August 14, 1912. As of 1928, the North Avenue streetcar had owl service between 1:30 and 4:38 a.m., running a streetcar every thirty minutes. Streetcars were replaced by trolleybuses on December 4, 1949, which were in turn supplanted by conventional buses on February 1, 1953. As of 2022, the #72 North bus runs between 3:26 a.m. and 2:05 a.m. on weekdays and around 3:30 a.m. and 2 a.m. during the weekends and holidays, with its intervals ranging from 7 to 21 minutes.

=== Ridership ===
On its opening day, 1,250 passengers had used Robey station by 3 p.m., and it was expected to accommodate around 10,000 patrons before the day closed. Between 1900 and 1945, Damen was the highest-ridership station on the Northwest branch every year, but starting in 1904 consistently lagged the original Logan Square terminal on the Logan Square branch, and in the 1940s had similar statistics to California on the branch as well. Ridership peaked in this era at 1,465,162 passengers in 1907, although it served more than a million passengers every year from 1901 through 1927 except for 1922. Ridership started to plummet shortly thereafter during the Great Depression, bottoming out at 350,476 riders in 1933. Its overall performance on the "L" was lackluster during the late 1940s; in 1947, it was the 109th-busiest of the 222 "L" stations that were at least partially staffed, whereas in 1948 it was the 96th-busiest of 223 such stations at the beginning of the year. (Note: Several stations on the Niles Center and Westchester branches were permanently unstaffed and thus did not collect ridership statistics. Several stations closed on the "L" during 1948. Exchange station on the Stock Yards branch discontinued gathering statistics for 1947, but its neighbor Racine began collecting them in 1948.) In 1946 and 1947, Damen was surpassed by Chicago on the Northwest branch, but regained the top spot in 1948. This proved to be short-lived, however; although it briefly regained a million passengers in 1950 for the first time since 1927, after the subway was built it consistently had lower ridership than Division from 1953 through 2003, with a steadily-declining patronage that reached a new low of 329,367 riders in 1975. Nevertheless, in 1978 it still had the fifth-highest ridership on the Milwaukee branch. Ridership data is not available for 1949 or 1952.

By 1979, the station served 780,908 passengers. Ridership steadily increased through the 1980s and 1990s, before once again reaching a million in 1997. Ridership consistently exceeded a million every year thereafter; in 2006, a new all-time peak of 1,517,323 passengers was set. After further growth, and a sustained annual ridership of a million or more, two million riders were recorded in 2012. Except for 2014, in which the station was closed for renovations for several months, ridership continued to surpass two million every year through 2019, peaking at 2,233,065 riders in 2015. As of 2014, the station was the fourth-busiest on the O'Hare branch behind O'Hare, Jefferson Park, and Logan Square. In 2019, Damen had a total ridership of 2,023,150, making it the 26th-most ridden of the "L"'s 145 stations; this declined by 71.2 percent to 582,967 in 2020 due to the COVID-19 pandemic, which also reduced its ranking to the 33rd-most ridden station. Ridership rebounded somewhat in 2021, increasing by 21.1 percent to 705,715, and rebounding its rank to the 22nd-most ridden station, and continued its recovery in 2022, reaching 947,465 riders for a 34.3 percent increase and being the 25th-most ridden of 143 "L" stations open that year. (Note: Berwyn and Lawrence stations, both on the Red Line, are currently closed for several years starting in May 2021 for temporary reconstruction work.)

=== Damen Tower ===
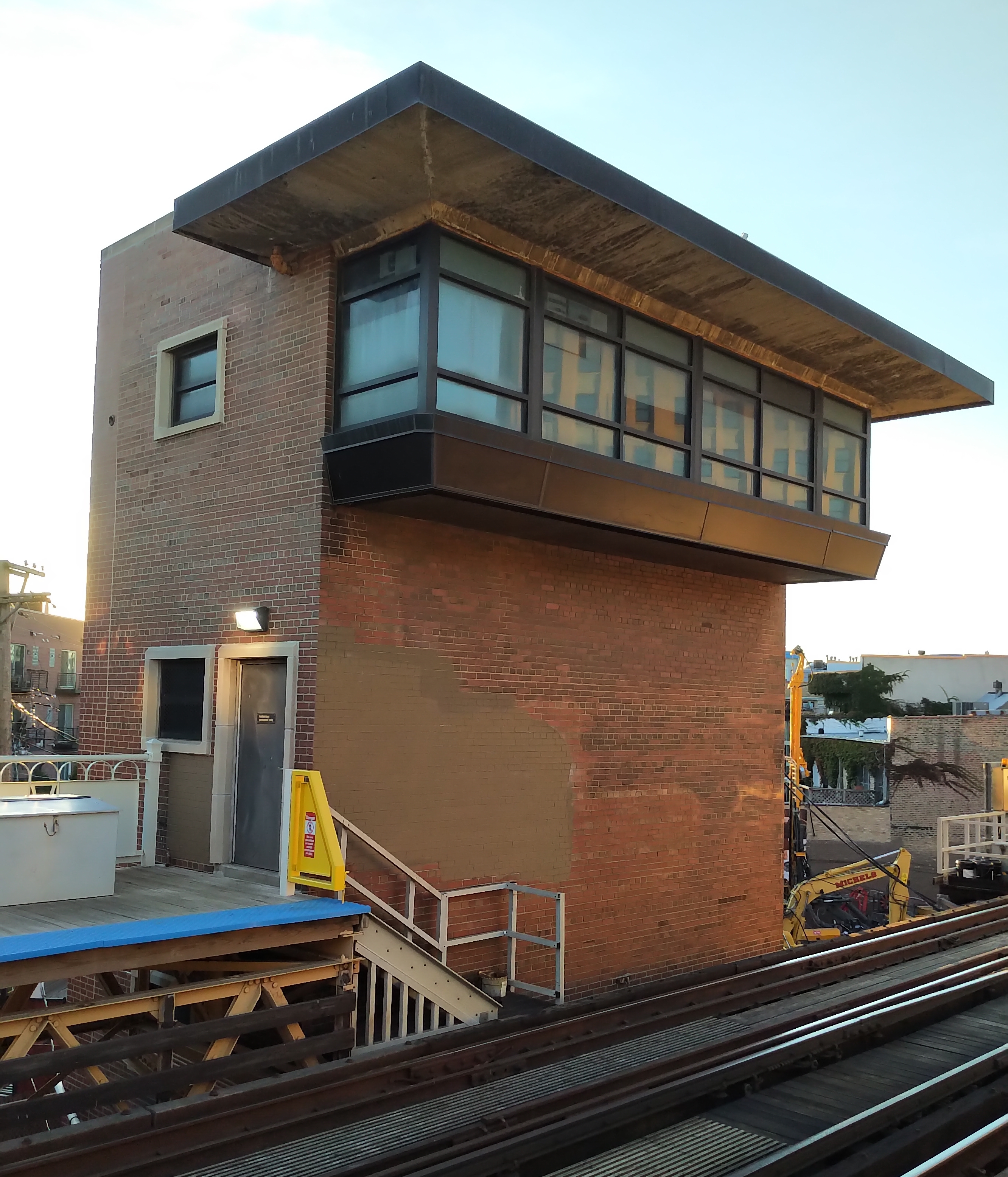
Damen Tower in 2022

A tower has existed at Damen since its opening in 1895. The original tower was used for switching trains between Humboldt Park and Logan Square. Electric trains in the late 19th century entailed one powered "motor car" pulling multiple unpowered "trailers". Humboldt Park trains were an exception; their motor cars pushed their trailers to Robey, where they would be coupled to Logan Square motor cars for the trip downtown. This was done outside of rush hours, when Humboldt Park trains ran through to downtown directly, and night periods, when they contained only one car. Multiple-unit control was adopted by the Metropolitan between 1904 and 1905 and ended this particular practice, but combining Humboldt Park and Logan Square trains at Damen continued until 1950.

The current tower, built in 1950, has never been used. It was originally intended to switch trains between Logan Square and Humboldt Park like its predecessor, as well as switch trains between the Milwaukee–Dearborn subway and Logan Square elevated; the subway was intended to supplement the elevated, similar to how the State Street subway supplements the older elevated North Side main line. However, when the CTA assumed control, it decided to discontinue Humboldt Park service and the old Logan Square elevated, rendering the tower superfluous. Despite this, the tower was still built on the west side of the tracks on the northern end of the southbound platform. In acknowledgment of its uselessness, it was never equipped with a tower panel or any other switching equipment. After the new tower was built, the original tower continued to be used for switching trains between the branches until Humboldt Park service was discontinued and the interlocking removed in 1954, being demolished sometime in the late 1950s.

== Works cited ==
- "The Metropolitan West Side Elevated Railroad of Chicago". The Street Railway Review. 5: 263–274. January 15, 1895.
- Borzo, Greg (2007). The Chicago "L". Charleston, South Carolina: Arcadia. ISBN 9780738551005 – via Google Books.
- Public Information Department (1967). Congress Rapid Transit. Chicago: Chicago Transit Authority – via Internet Archive.
- CTA Rail Entrance, Annual Traffic, 1900–1979 (Report). Chicago: Chicago Transit Authority. October 1, 1979.
- Commission on Chicago Landmarks (May 3, 2007). Milwaukee Avenue District (PDF) (Report). City of Chicago.
- Lind, Alan R. (1974). Chicago Surface Lines: An Illustrated History. Park Forest, Illinois: Transport History Press.
- Moffat, Bruce G. (1995). The "L": The Development of Chicago's Rapid Transit System, 1888–1932. Chicago: Central Electric Railfans' Association. ISBN 0-915348-30-6.
- Weller, Peter; Stark, Fred (1999). The Living Legacy of the Chicago Aurora and Elgin. San Francisco: Forum Press. ISBN 0-945213-41-7 – via Internet Archive.
