= Exchange station (CTA) =

Former station on the Chicago "L"

EXCHANGE 4100S 1000W

General information
- Location: Exchange Street and Morgan Street; Chicago, Illinois
- Coordinates: 41.81870°N 87.65065°W
- Owner: Chicago Transit Authority
- Line: Stock Yards branch
- Platforms: 2 side platforms
- Tracks: 2 tracks

Construction
- Structure type: Elevated

History
- Opened: April 8, 1908
- Closed: October 7, 1957

Former services
Preceding station	Chicago "L"	Following station
Racine Yards-bound terminus	Stock Yards branch	Indiana Terminus
Armour One-way operation	Stock Yards branch	Indiana Terminus
Location

Exchange was a station on the Chicago "L"'s Stock Yards branch. Its ridership information is missing in 1947, but returned as Racine in 1948.

== Works cited ==
- CTA Rail Entrance, Annual Traffic, 1900–1979 (Report). Chicago: Chicago Transit Authority. October 1, 1979.
