= King Drive station =

Chicago "L" station

King Drive 6300S 400E
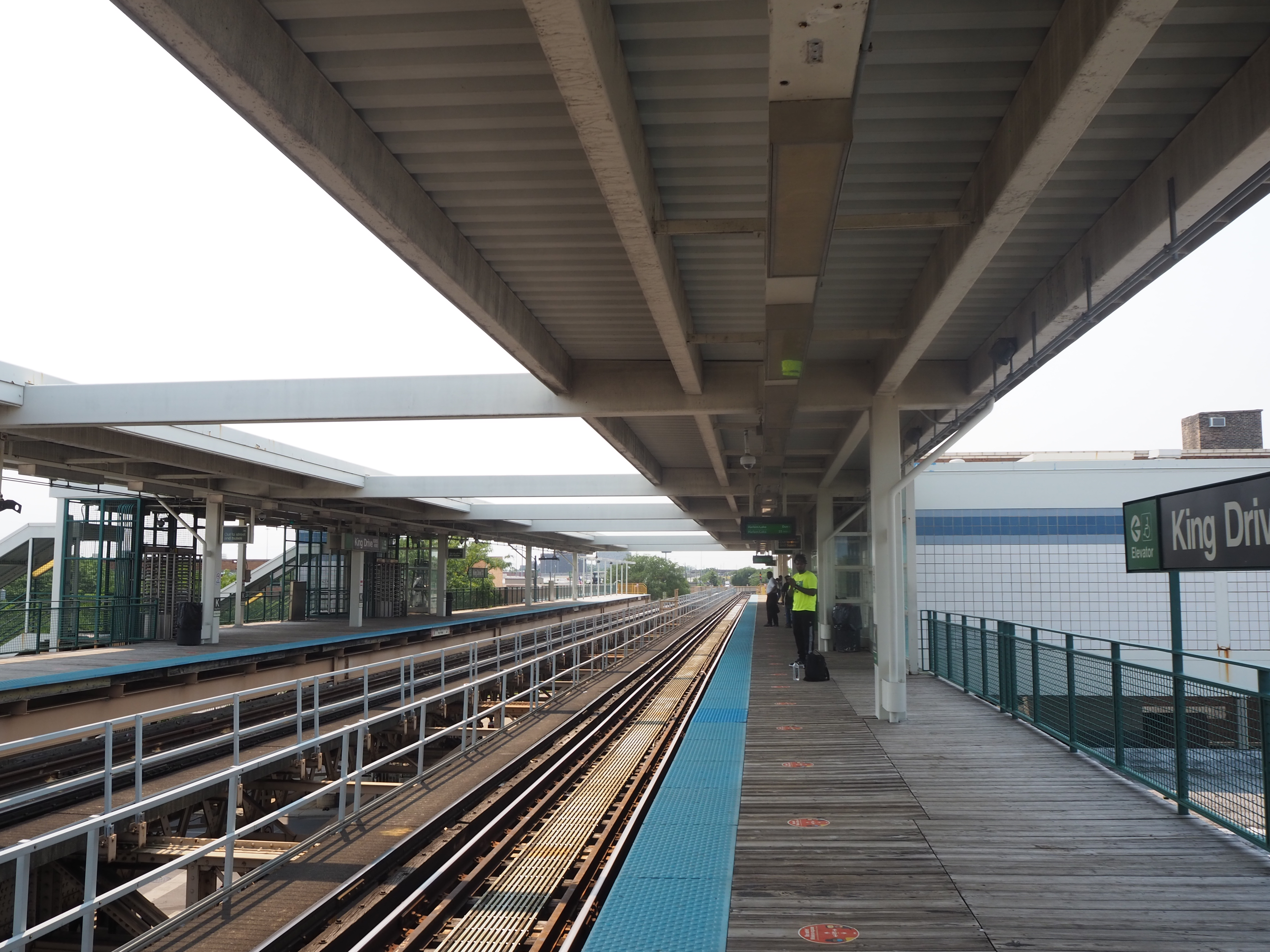
- Inbound platform at King Drive station

General information
- Location: 400 East 63rd Street; Chicago, Illinois
- Coordinates: 41.78013°N 87.615546°W
- Owner: Chicago Transit Authority
- Line: East 63rd Branch
- Platforms: 2 side platforms
- Tracks: 2
- Connections: CTA bus

Construction
- Structure type: Elevated
- Cycle facilities: Yes
- Accessible: Yes

History
- Opened: May 1, 1893; 133 years ago
- Rebuilt: 1991–1993; 33 years ago
- Former names: South Park

Passengers
- 2025: 108,938 ▲27.2%

Services
Preceding station	Chicago "L"	Following station
Garfield toward Harlem/Lake	Green Line East 63rd branch	Cottage Grove Terminus
Former services
Preceding station	Chicago "L"	Following station
61st Closed 1994 toward Harlem/Lake	Green Line Jackson Park branch	Cottage Grove toward University
Track layout
Location

King Drive station (formerly South Park) is a station on the Chicago Transit Authority's 'L' system. It is located in the Woodlawn neighborhood of Chicago, Illinois and serves the Green Line's East 63rd branch. The station is situated at 400 East 63rd Street. The station opened on May 1, 1893. The station only allows boarding on the inbound platform (towards Harlem); the outbound platform (towards Cottage Grove) is exit-only.

Historically, the station was called South Park or South Park Avenue. When South Park Avenue was renamed Dr. Martin Luther King Jr. Drive in 1968, the station name followed suit, effective July 31, 1968.

In 2022, the King Drive station was the least-used in the CTA system, with 63,011 embarkments (compared to 2.7 million for the most-used station, Lake).

== Bus connections ==
CTA

- 3 King Drive
- 63 63rd (Owl Service)
