= Dorchester station =

Railway station in the United States of America

Dorchester 1400E 6300S
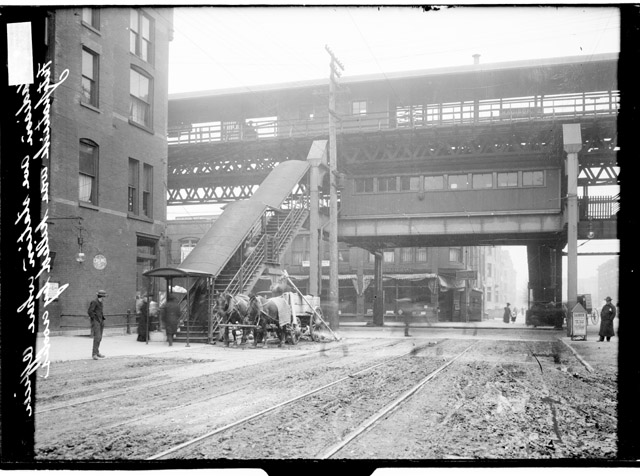
- Dorchester station in 1906

General information
- Location: 1400 East 63rd Street; Woodlawn, Chicago, Illinois
- Coordinates: 41.78055°N 87.59305°W
- Owner: Chicago Transit Authority
- Line: Jackson Park Branch
- Platforms: 1
- Tracks: 2
- Connections: IC Electric: 63rd Street station

Construction
- Structure type: Elevated

History
- Opened: April 23, 1893; 133 years ago
- Closed: January 13, 1973; 53 years ago
- Rebuilt: 1994 (work suspended, never completed)
- Former names: Madison Avenue

Former services
Preceding station	Chicago "L"	Following station
University toward Howard	Jackson Park branch	Jackson Park Terminus
Location

Dorchester was a station on the Jackson Park branch of the Chicago "L". The station opened on April 23, 1893 and closed on January 13, 1973, as part of a group of budget-related CTA station closings. Dorchester was scheduled to be the new terminal of the Jackson Park Branch, but the CTA decided to make Cottage Grove the new terminal, because the Reverend Arthur Brazier and some other Woodlawn residents thought the 'L' structure over East 63rd Street would further blight Woodlawn and prevent redevelopment.
