= Garfield station (CTA Green Line) =

Chicago "L" station

Garfield 5500S 320E
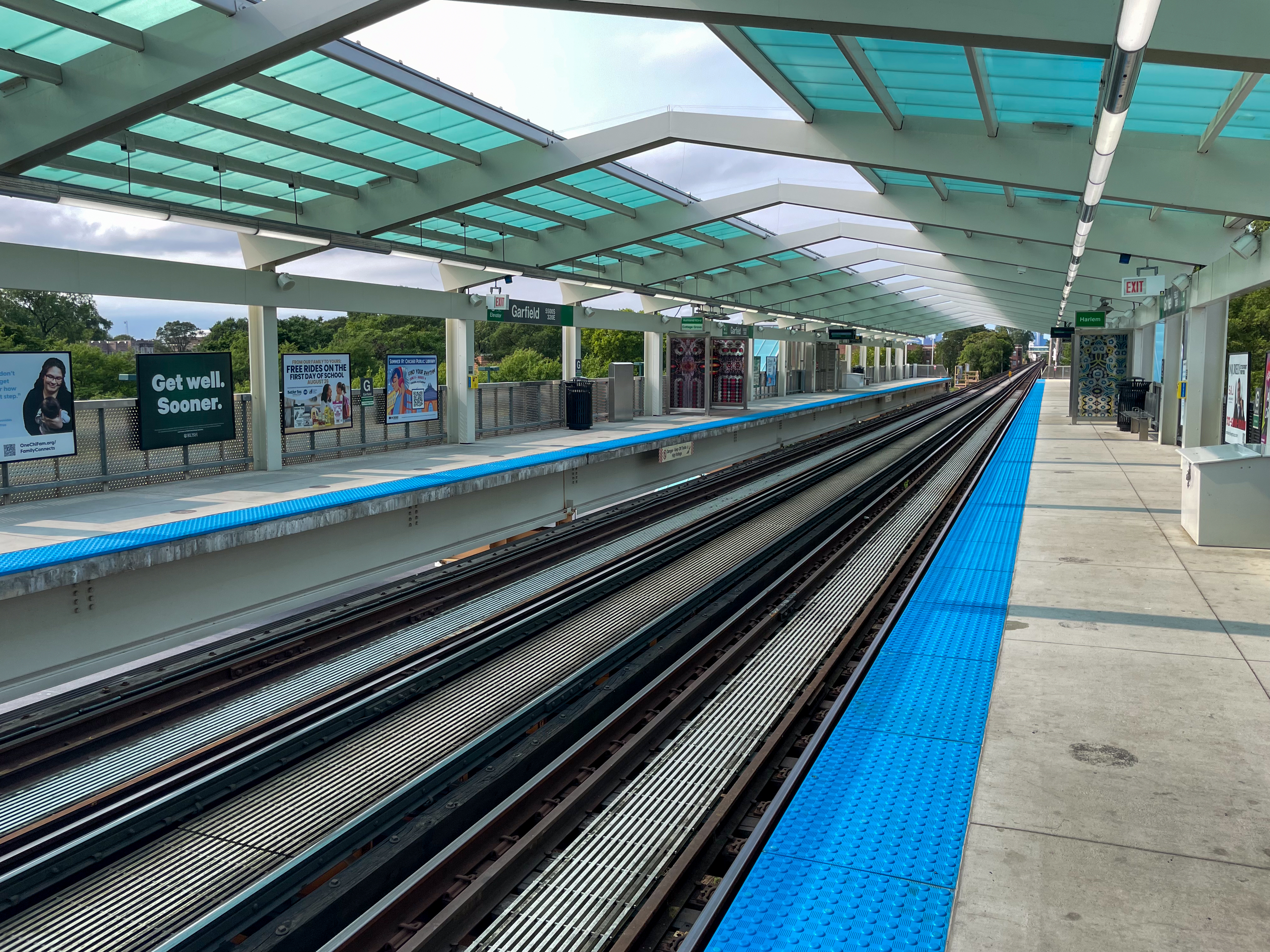
- Harlem/Lake-bound platform at Garfield station, July 2024.

General information
- Location: 320 East Garfield Boulevard; Chicago, Illinois 60615
- Coordinates: 41.79454°N 87.61835°W
- Owner: Chicago Transit Authority
- Line: South Side Elevated
- Platforms: 2 side platforms
- Tracks: 2 tracks
- Connections: CTA bus

Construction
- Structure type: Elevated
- Parking: 117 spaces
- Cycle facilities: Yes
- Accessible: Yes

History
- Opened: October 12, 1892; 134 years ago
- Rebuilt: 2000–2001; 25 years ago, 2018–2019; 7 years ago
- Former names: 55th Street

Passengers
- 2025: 278,924 ▲26.9%

Services
Preceding station	Chicago "L"	Following station
51st toward Harlem/Lake	Green Line East 63rd branch	King Drive toward Cottage Grove
51st toward Harlem/Lake	Green Line Ashland branch	Halsted toward Ashland/63rd
Former services
Preceding station	Chicago "L"	Following station
51st toward Harlem/Lake	Green Line	58th Closed 1994 toward Ashland or University
Track layout
Location

Garfield is an "L" station on the CTA's Green Line. It is situated at 320 E. Garfield Boulevard in the Washington Park neighborhood. It opened on October 12, 1892. This station is the southernmost Green Line station served by both of the Green Line's branches: south of Garfield, the Green Line splits into two branches, one terminating at Ashland/63rd, and one at Cottage Grove.

Another Garfield station, in the median of the Dan Ryan Expressway, serves the Red Line. During the closure of the Dan Ryan branch of the Red Line from May through October 2013, Garfield station served as the terminus of several temporary bus routes in order to mitigate the effects of the closure. Each of the bus routes transferred passengers from the sites of closed Red Line stations south of 69th street to Garfield station, where fares were waived while the Red Line remained closed.

The station is close to the University of Chicago and is the closest 'L' station to the Museum of Science and Industry, although the museum is more than two miles away from the station.

One station entrance is the oldest entrance on the CTA system. The entrance closed in 2000 and was filled in with cement in 2013. The front of the entrance remains. In June 2017, the University of Chicago announced plans to renovate the interior and reopen the former station entrance as a part of their Arts Block complex. The site is now home to the L1 Retail Store, which is "a creative business accelerator program (launched August 2020) and retail store (opened October 2021)" managed by UChicago Arts + Public Life.

== Garfield Gateway Project ==
The $43 million project (equivalent to $54.1 million in 2025) began on June 15, 2018 and was completed on January 10, 2019.

== Bus connections ==
CTA

- 55 Garfield (Owl Service)

== Image gallery ==
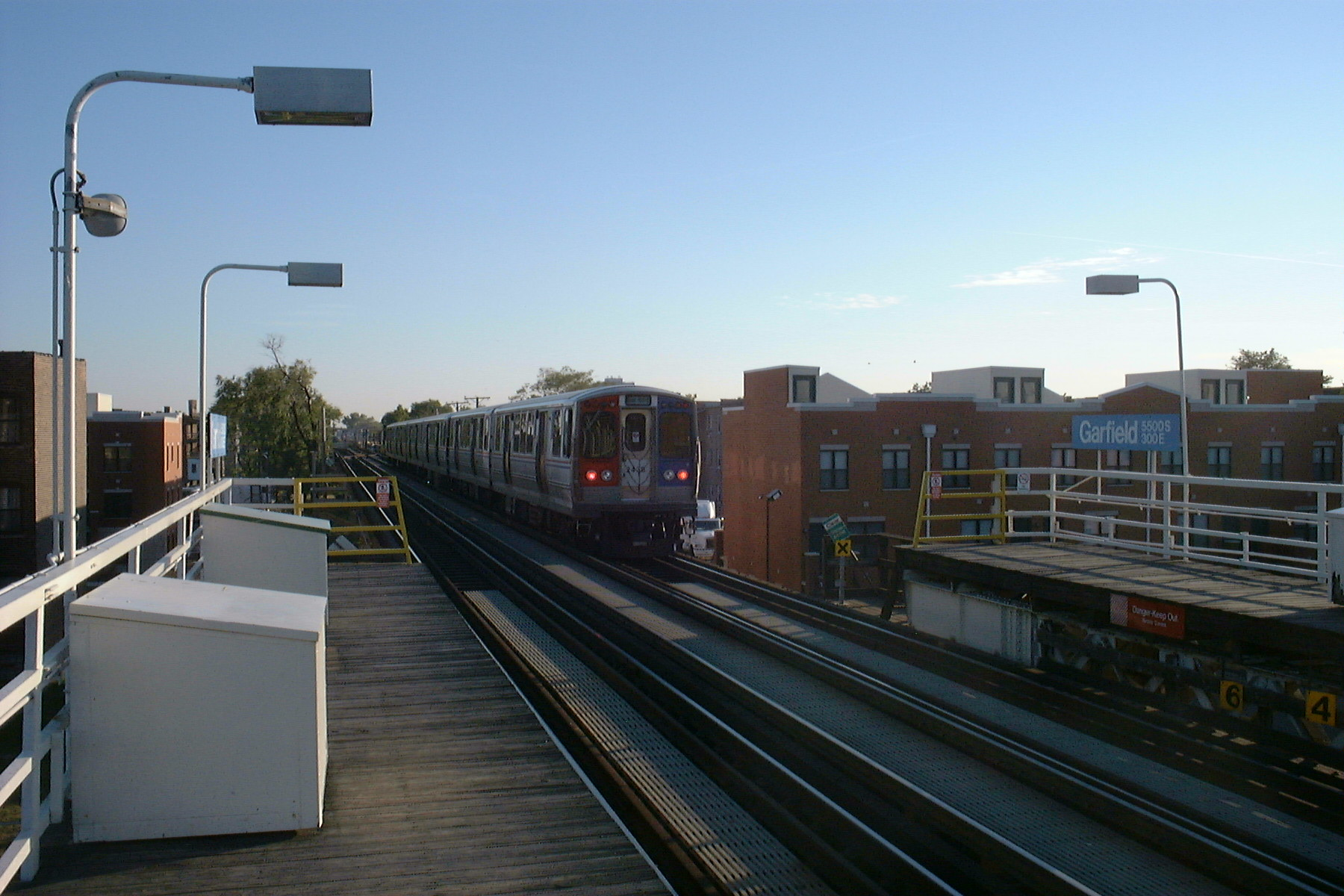
The original Garfield station before reconstruction in October 2000

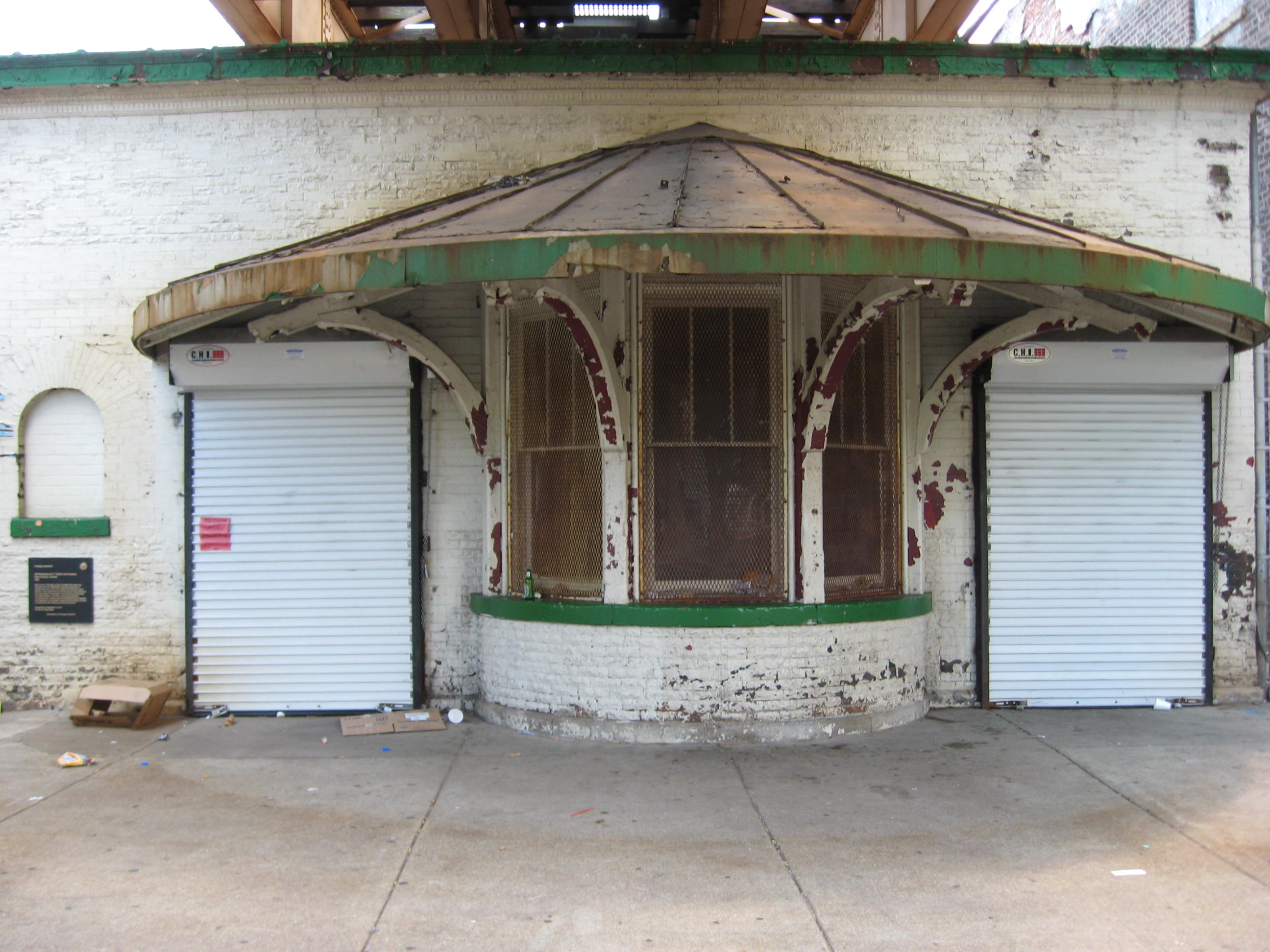
Historic Garfield station entrance and overpass

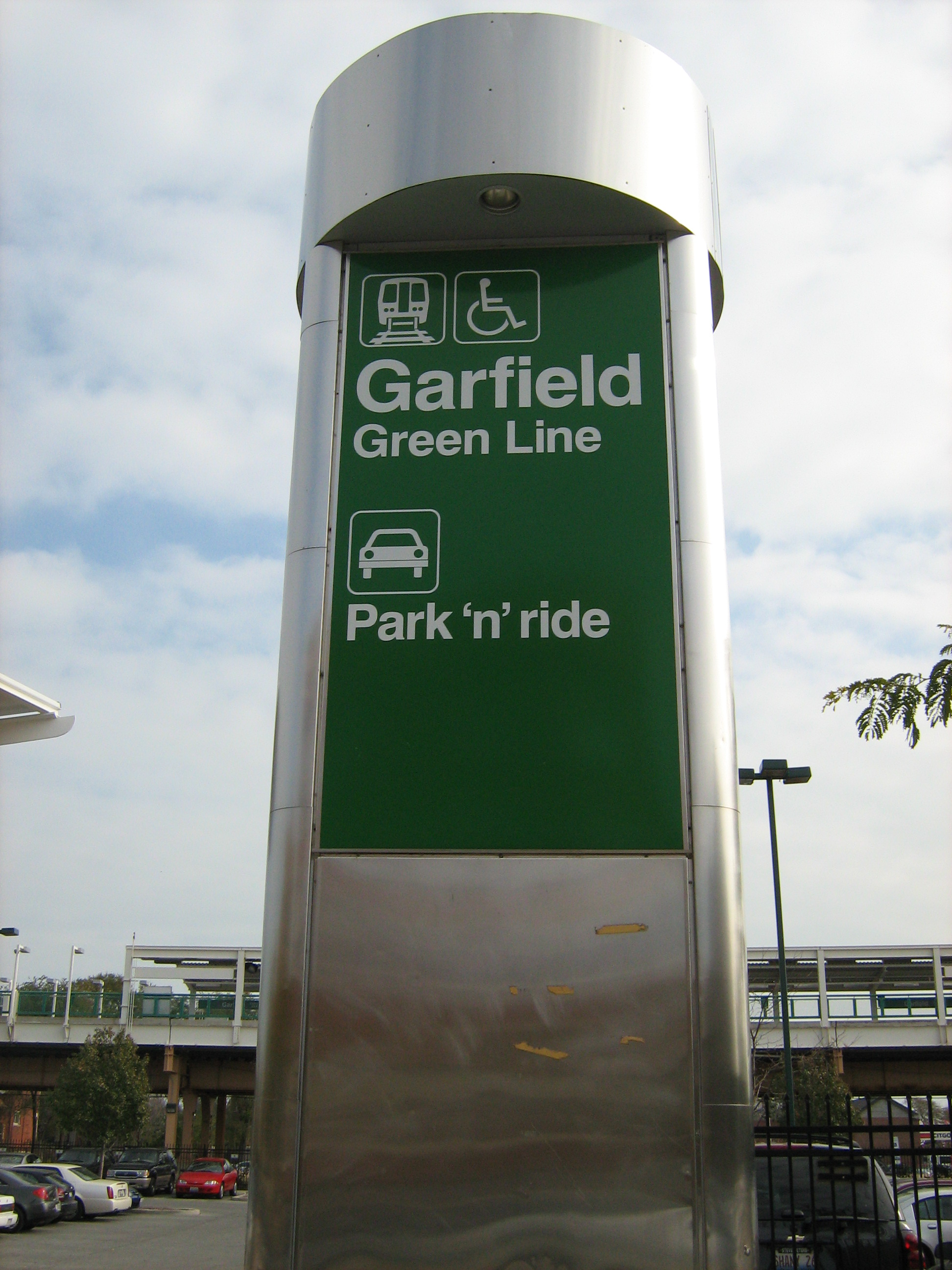
Parking sign

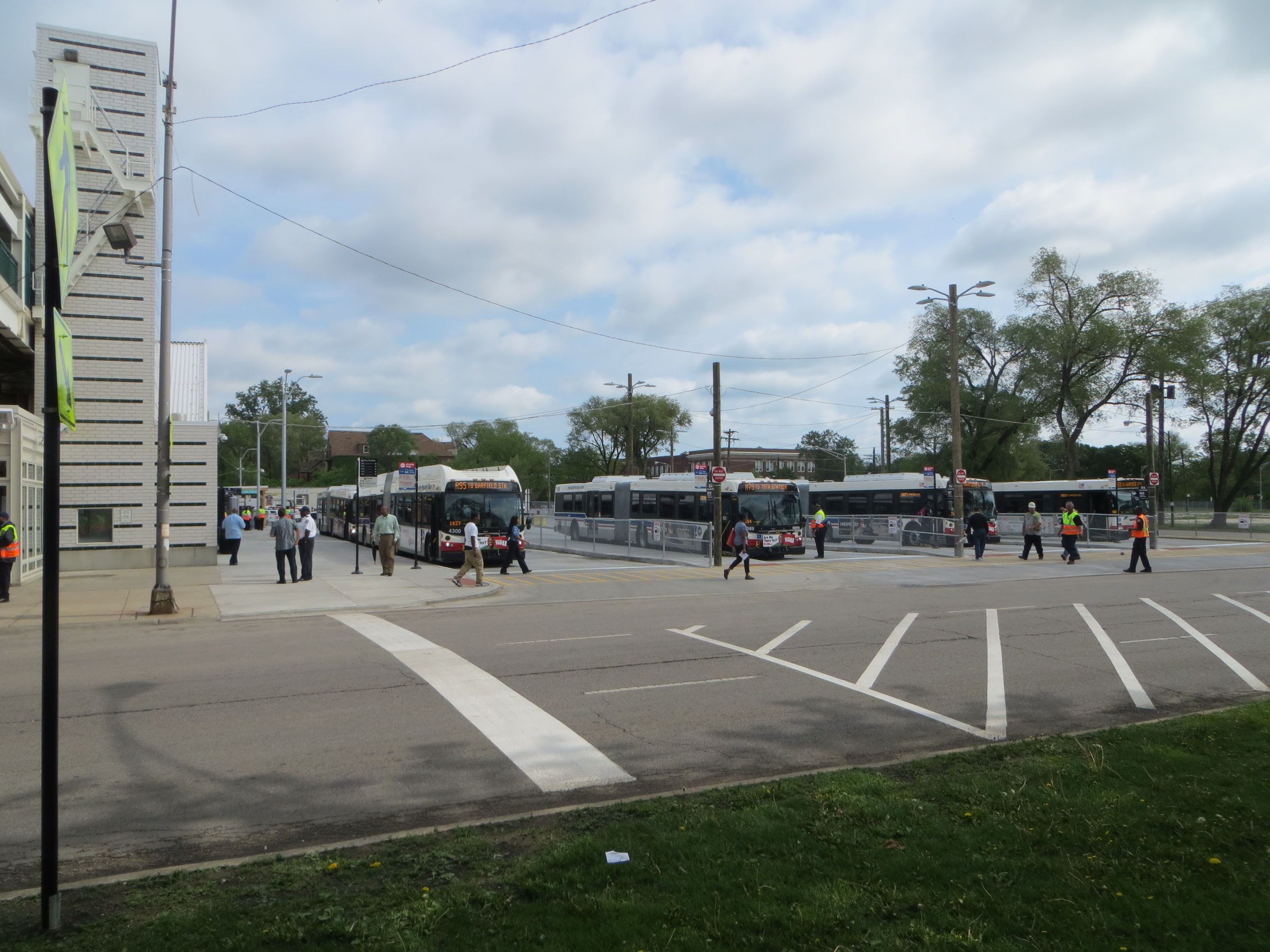
Temporary shuttle bus terminal during Red Line reconstruction, 2013

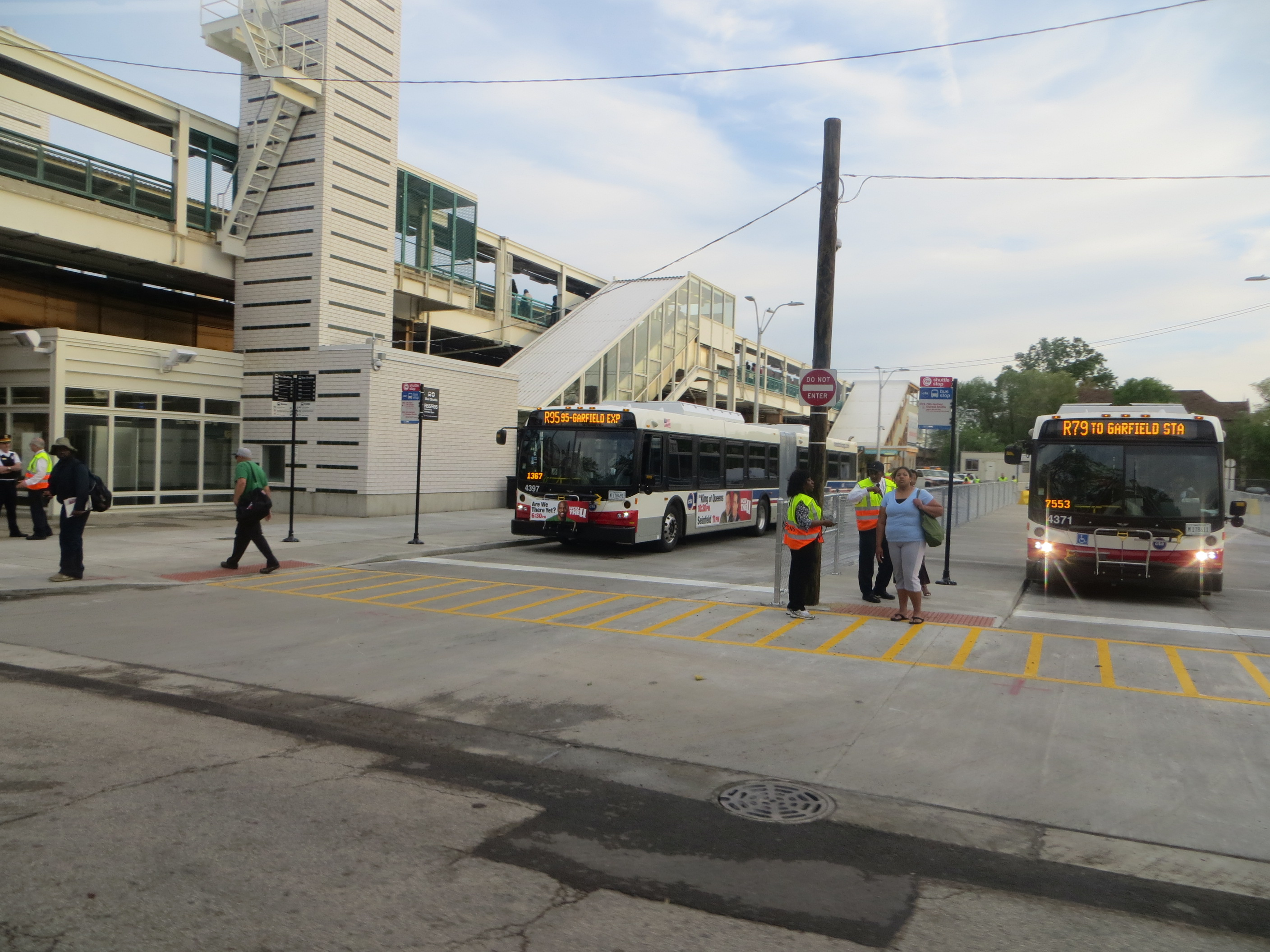

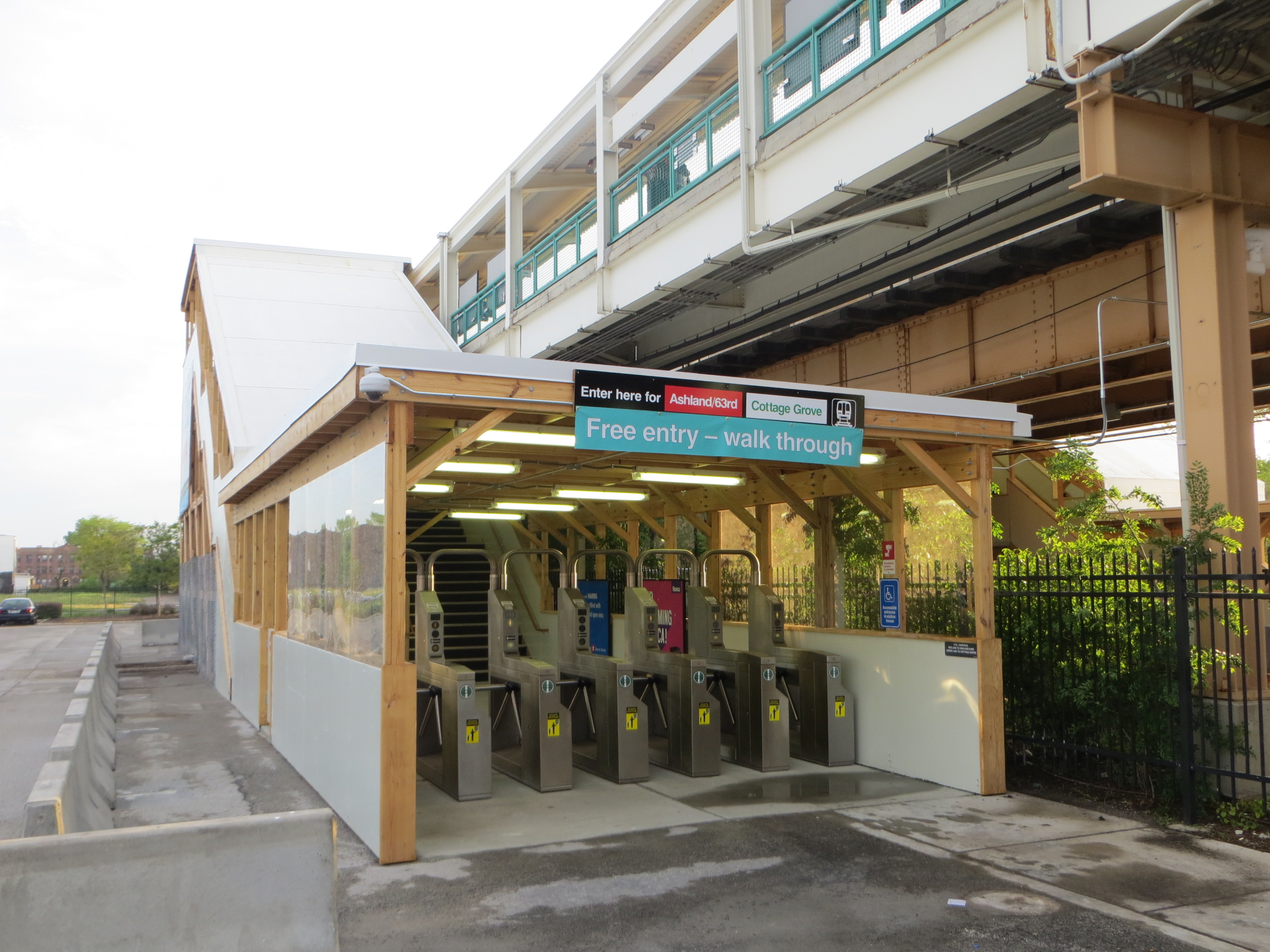
Free entrance to Garfield station during Red Line reconstruction
