= Upper 61st and Lower 63rd Yards =

Chicago "L" rail yard complex

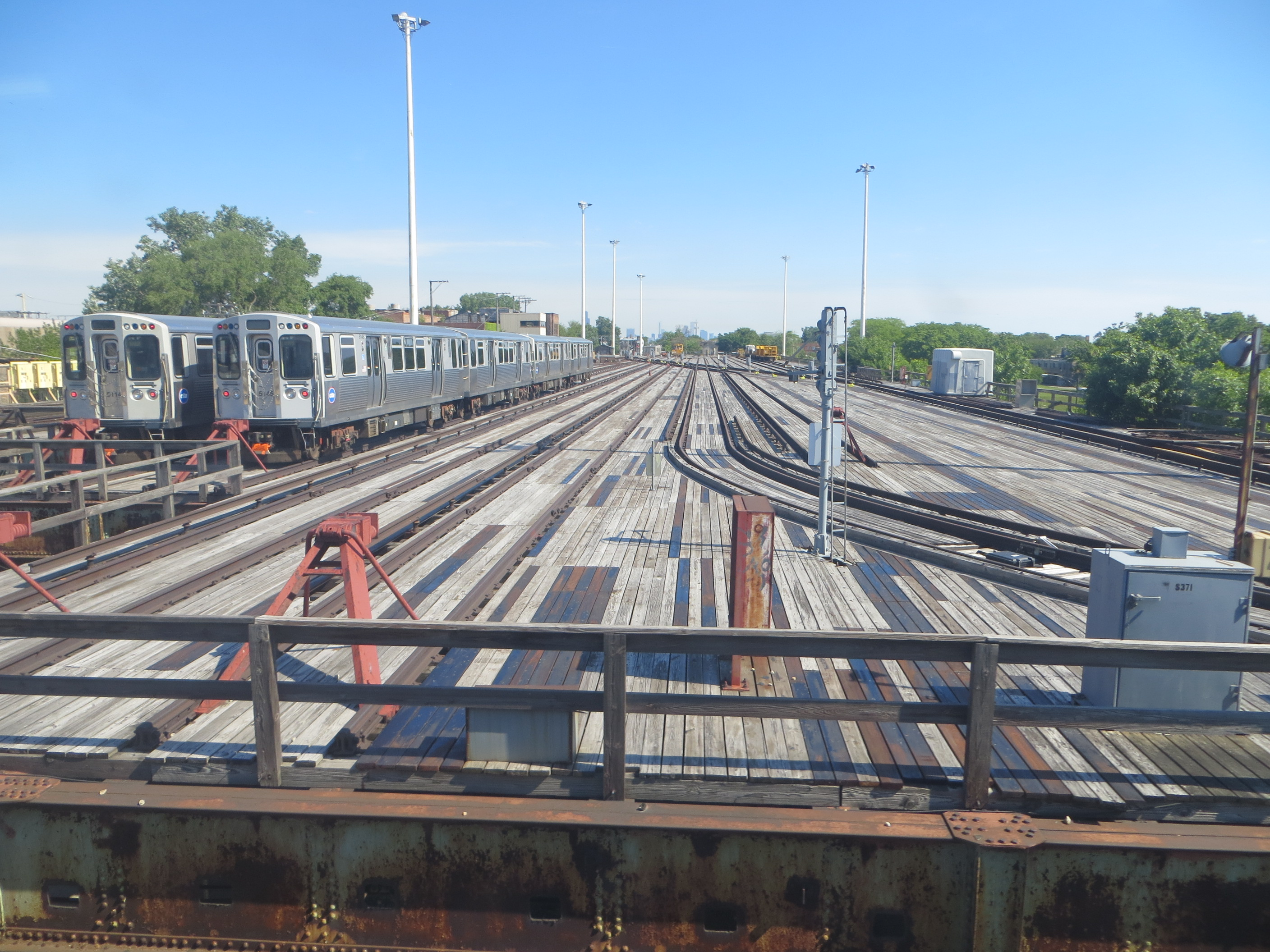
- 5000-series trains temporarily stored in the Upper 61st Yard, 2013
- Interactive map of Upper 61st and Lower 63rd Yards

Location
- Location: 317 East 63rd Street; Chicago, Illinois 60637
- Coordinates: 41°46′46″N 87°37′05″W

Characteristics
- Owner: Chicago Transit Authority
- Type: Rapid transit
- Rolling stock: 5000-series
- Routes served: Green

History
- Opened: 1893; 133 years ago

The Upper 61st Yard and the Lower 63rd Yard are two connected rail yards on the Chicago "L" system, located on the South Side of Chicago, Illinois. The complex is located on the East 63rd branch, and is used to store and maintain maintenance-of-way equipment. The 61st Yard is the oldest portion of the complex, opening in 1893 to serve the steam trains of the South Side Elevated Railroad. The Lower 63rd Yard opened in 1905 as an expansion of the 61st Yard, following the electrification and rapid growth of the South Side Elevated.

The yard complex housed passenger trains until the late 1990s, when it was converted to a depot for non-revenue maintenance trains. The original maintenance shops at the complex were condemned as unsafe and demolished in 2009, and were replaced by the new Non-Revenue Rail Vehicle Maintenance Facility in 2023. In its current form, the Upper 61st/Lower 63rd yard complex stores and services the "L"'s maintenance equipment, and serves as a central depot for materials used in track repairs.

== Location ==
The yard complex is located at the border of the Washington Park and Greater Grand Crossing community areas on the South Side of Chicago. The yards are connected to the "L"'s East 63rd branch, formerly known as the Jackson Park branch. The tracks past the yard are served by the Green Line. The 61st Yard was connected to 61st station from the line's opening until the station's 1994 closure.

== History ==
The first portion of the South Side Elevated opened in 1892 from Congress Terminal to 39th Street, built by the Chicago and South Side Rapid Transit Railroad Company. The 39th Street terminal featured small service facilities, but it did not have sufficient space to store the entire fleet. The line was extended to Jackson Park in 1893 to serve the World's Columbian Exposition, and a yard was built along the main line, bounded by South Calumet Avenue, 61st, and 63rd Streets.

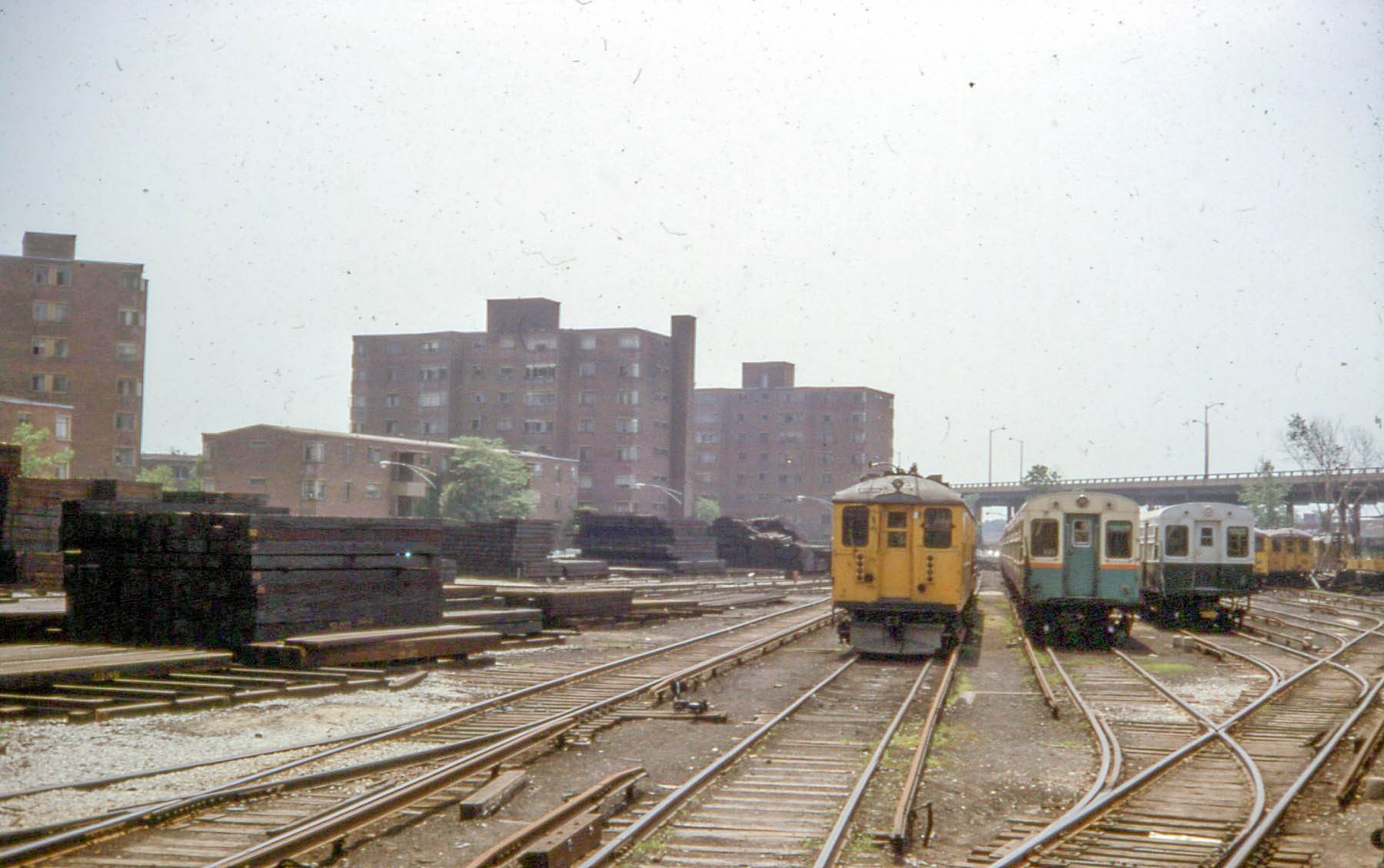
The Lower 63rd Yard in 1968

The C&SSRTRC experienced financial difficulties after the exposition closed, and was reorganized as the South Side Elevated Railroad in 1896. The South Side Elevated Railroad expanded the yard northward in 1897 to support its electrification, with a new shop building that connected to 61st Street station. The line's existing passenger coaches were converted to electric multiple units with new electrical equipment, and placed back into service with the existing steam locomotives until the beginning of electric service in 1898. Traffic on the South Side Elevated increased substantially after electric service began, and the yard was expanded to the south in 1905. The southern extension of the yard is at ground level, and is known as the Lower 63rd Yard today.

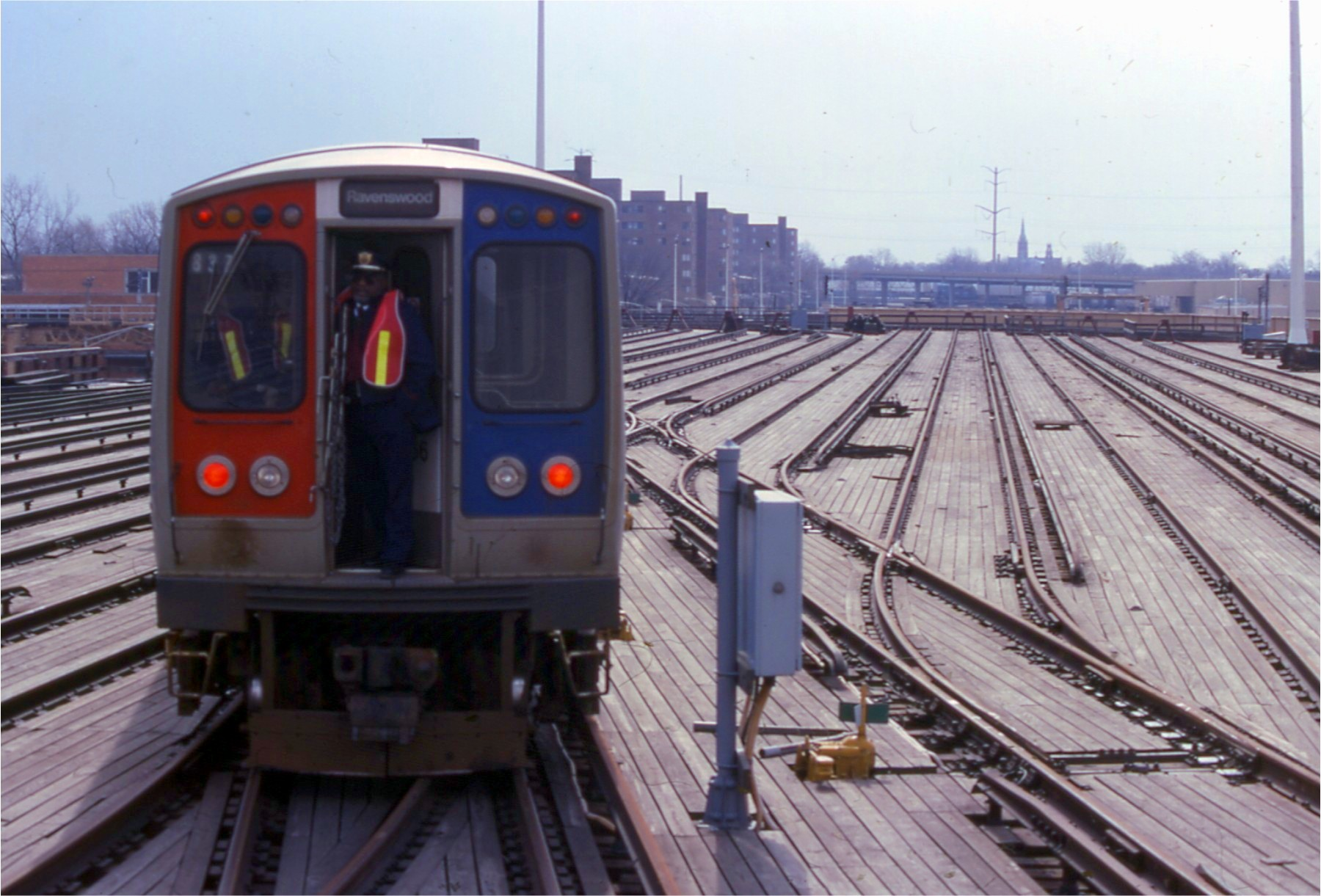
A 2400-series train in the Upper 61st Yard in 1996

The South Side Elevated was bought out by Samuel Insull and merged with three other companies, forming the Chicago Rapid Transit Company in 1924. The CRT operated the "L" system until 1947, when it was taken over by the Chicago Transit Authority. The CTA connected the Lower 63rd Yard to the ex-Chicago Surface Lines streetcar tracks on 63rd Street, but with the abandonment of the entire CTA streetcar system by 1958, the 61st/63rd yard complex resumed serving only rapid transit cars. The heavy maintenance services of the 61st Yard shops were moved to the Skokie Shops in the early 1950s. In 1966, the Upper 61st Yard had a capacity of 188 cars, and the Lower 63rd Yard could store 88.

The yard complex was converted to a maintenance and storage facility for non-revenue equipment in the 1990s. Non-revenue equipment on the CTA includes snowplows, switcher locomotives, flatcars, and other equipment for track and station maintenance. The original 1890s-era maintenance shops at the northern end of the complex were found to be structurally unsound in 2009, and were demolished. Heavy maintenance on non-revenue equipment was temporarily moved to the Skokie Shops, but space constraints meant that a replacement for the original 61st Street shops was needed.

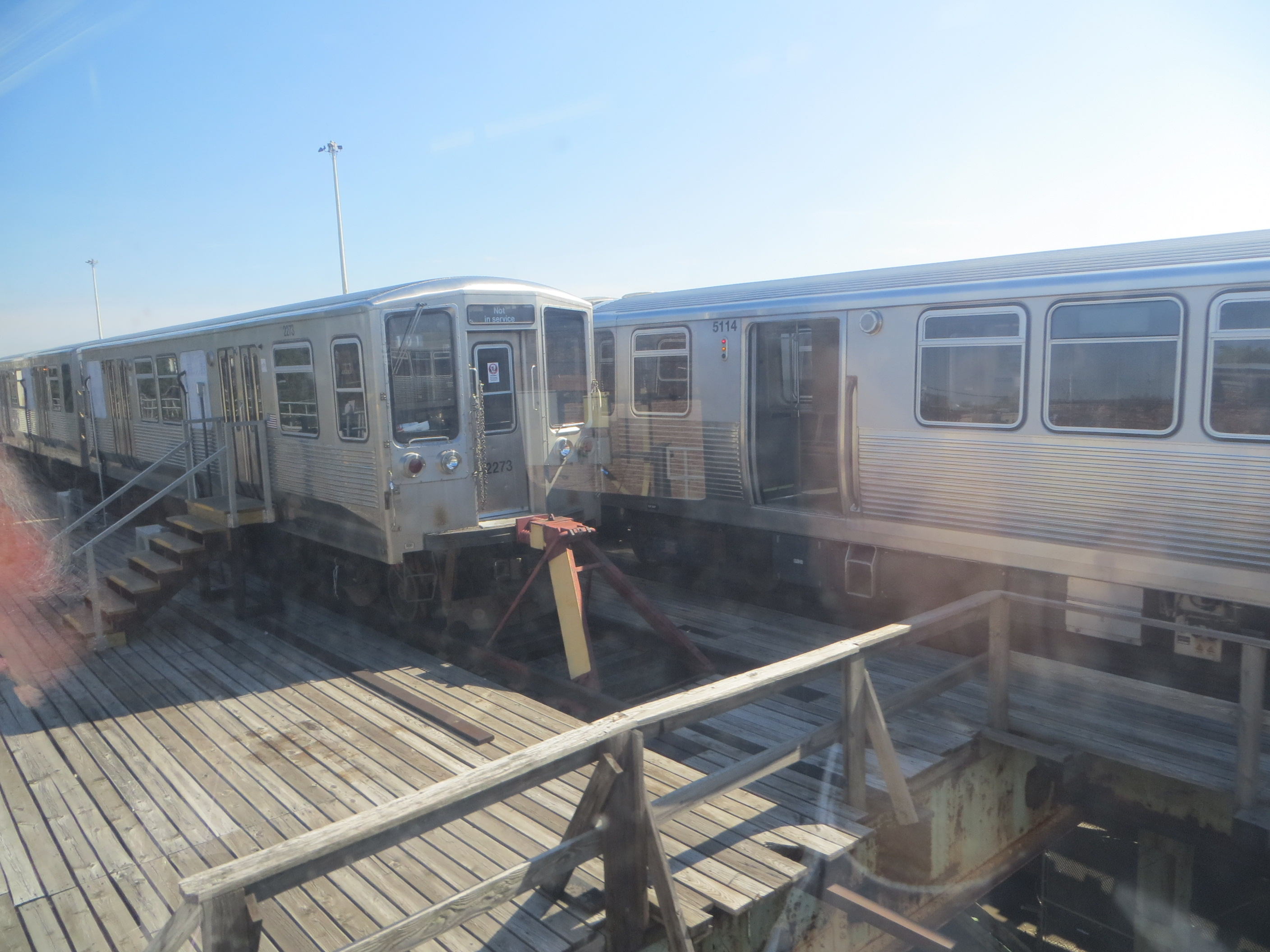
Retired 2200-series cars used as a temporary office (left) and 5000-series cars for Green Line service (right) at the Upper 61st Yard in 2013

Red Line service was rerouted over the Green Line to its Ashland/63rd terminal during a reconstruction project on the Dan Ryan branch in 2013. During the project, Red Line trains were stored at the Ashland Yard, displacing Green Line trains (which were all rerouted to Cottage Grove) to temporary facilities at the Upper 61st Yard. Due to the demolition of the shop building, no office space was available for the temporary yard, and a pair of retired 2200-series cars were modified for use as an office during the shutdown.

The Skokie Shops were cut off from the rest of the "L" network from May to October 2015 after an embankment collapsed at a nearby water treatment plant. The Lower 63rd Yard, 22 miles (35 km) from Skokie, is the only other facility on the "L" system that is equipped to load railcars onto trucks. During the closure, the Skokie Shops continued their work inspecting new 5000-series cars and overhauling 3200-series cars. Cars being serviced at Skokie were moved over the "L" tracks to Lower 63rd and then transported by flatbed truck.

The former maintenance shop at the Upper 61st Yard was replaced with the new Non-Revenue Rail Vehicle Maintenance Facility in the Lower 63rd Yard, which opened in 2023. The new facility is specifically equipped for maintaining and rebuilding non-revenue equipment, some of which is custom-built in-house from retired passenger trains. The Non-Revenue Rail Vehicle Maintenance Facility was constructed at a cost of over $70 million, and houses approximately 125 vehicles.
