= Columbian Intramural Railway =

Elevated rail line for the World's Columbian Exposition

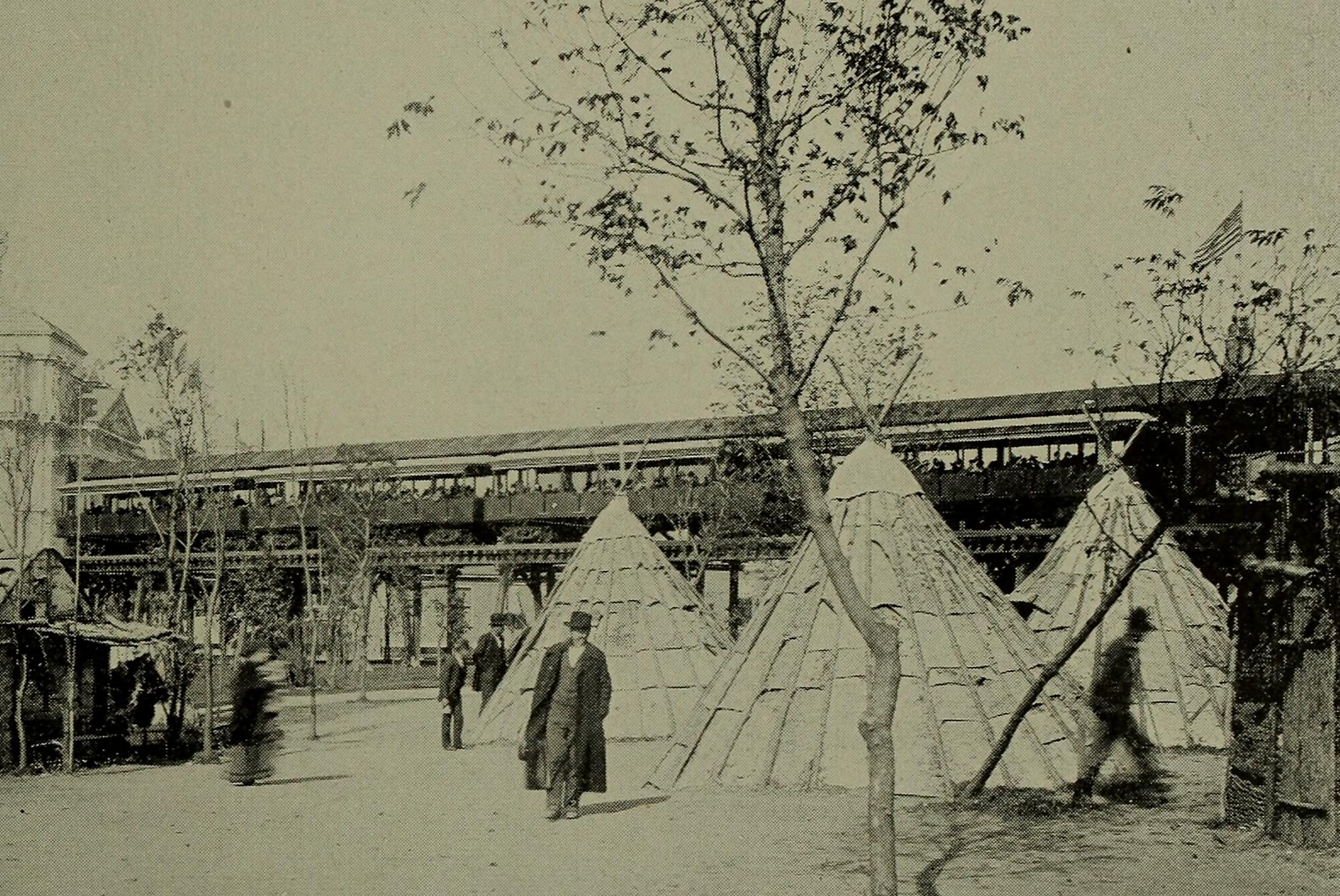
- Intramural Railway train

Overview
- Status: Demolished
- Locale: Chicago, Illinois, U.S.
- Termini: North Loop; South Loop
- Stations: 10

Service
- Operator: Columbian Interurban Railway Company
- Ridership: ~6,000,000

History
- Commenced: August 3, 1892; 134 years ago
- Opened: May 1, 1893; 133 years ago
- Completed: April 1893; 133 years ago
- Closed: October 31, 1893; 132 years ago

Technical
- Line length: 3.2 mi (5.1 km)
- Track length: 6.0 mi (9.7 km)
- Number of tracks: 2
- Character: Elevated
- Electrification: Third rail
- Operating speed: 30 mph (48 km/h)
Route map
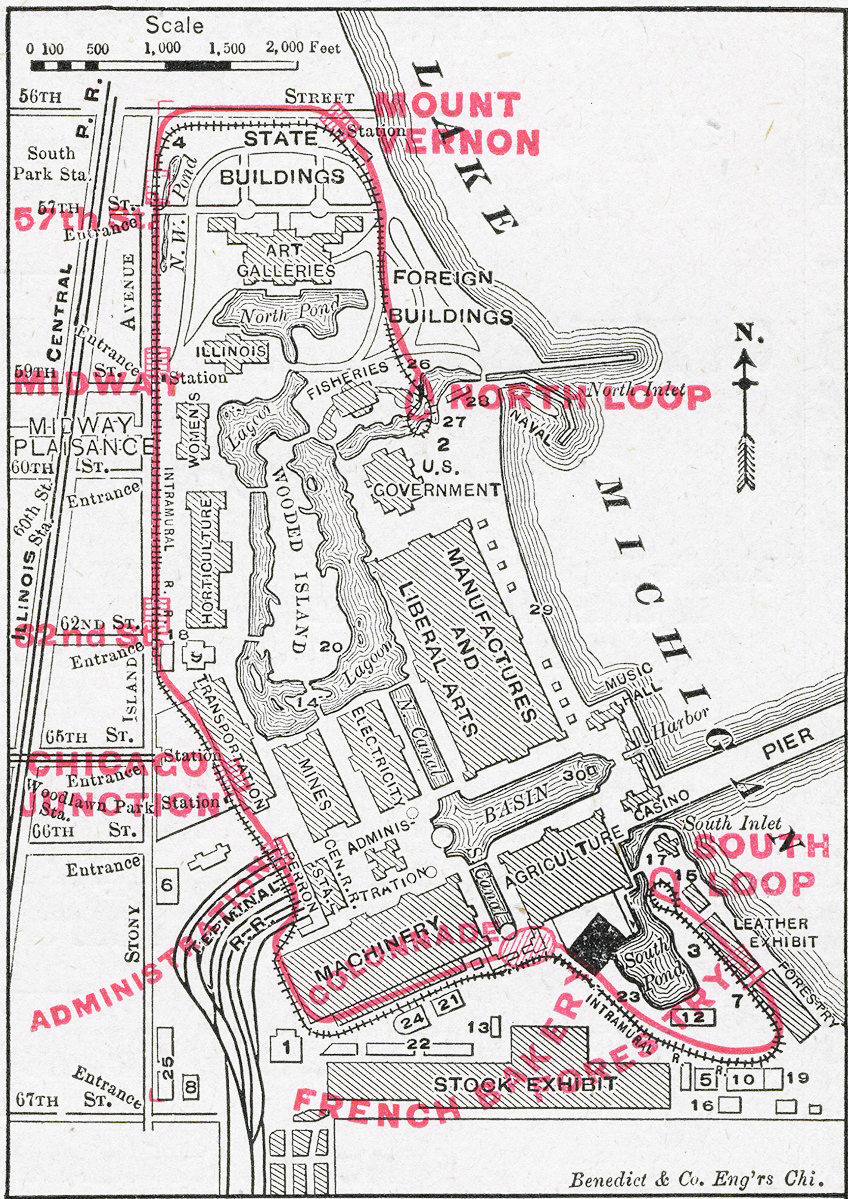

The Columbian Intramural Railway was an electrified elevated rail line located in Jackson Park in Chicago, Illinois. The Intramural was the first rail line in the United States to utilize third rail electrification, having been operational from May 1, 1893, to October 31, 1893, for the World's Columbian Exposition. The success of the line resulted in the adoption of third rail throughout the Chicago "L" by 1898.

== History ==
In anticipation for the World's Columbian Exposition, the Intramural Railway was planned to be a temporary and experimental electric rail line, with much of the funding coming from wealthy donors. At the time, the effectiveness of electric traction was not fully understood.

The Western Dummy Railroad Company was contracted to build the Intramural. However, General Electric instead carried out the line's construction alongside the installation of electrical system that would power Intramural trains. Construction began on August 3, 1892; test cars ran in April 1893. The project cost was $700,000 (equivalent to $25,000,000 in 2025).

The Intramural opened as part of the exposition from May 1 to October 31, 1893; the line was demolished shortly after the exposition's closure. Throughout the line's operational period, about six million people have taken the Intramural.

=== Legacy ===
The success of the Intramural directly resulted in the adoption of third rail electrification by the Metropolitan West Side Elevated Railroad in the planning process, having originally planned to use steam locomotives. By 1898, the other "L" companies at the time, the South Side Elevated Railroad and the Lake Street Elevated Railroad, converted its existing steam operation to third rail operation.

== Characteristics ==
The 3.2-mile-long (5.1 km) (Note: 14,800 feet (2.80 mi) of double track and 1,900 feet (0.36 mi) of single track) (Note: For the total length of the track (double counting the length of the double track), approximately 6 miles (9.7 km).) rail line comprised ten stations and track loops on both ends. Except for I-beam girders and rails, both of which were made of steel, wood was the primary material used to construct the rail line. Third rail was chosen as the method of electrification, making the Intramural the first to use such electric traction method in the United States. Intramural trains could travel up to 30 miles per hour (48 km/h); accounting for multiple stops, a round trip could last 21 minutes. The fare for the line was 10 cents (equivalent to $3.58 in 2025).

== Station listing ==
Station	Connections and notes
North Loop	
Mount Vernon	
57th Street	
Midway	
62nd Street	
Chicago Junction	Chicago "L": South Side Elevated Railroad (Jackson Park branch)
Administration	Baltimore and Ohio Railroad; Illinois Central Railroad
Colonnade	
Forestry	
South Loop	
