= 61st station =

Demolished Chicago "L" Station

61st 6100S 300E

General information
- Location: 316 East 61st Street; Chicago, Illinois 60637
- Coordinates: 41.78385°N 87.61806°W
- Owner: Chicago Transit Authority
- Line: Jackson Park Branch
- Platforms: 2 side platforms
- Tracks: 2 tracks

Construction
- Structure type: Elevated

History
- Opened: January 22, 1893; 133 years ago
- Closed: January 9, 1994; 32 years ago

Former services
Preceding station	Chicago "L"	Following station
58th Closed 1994 toward Harlem/Lake	Green Line Jackson Park branch	King Drive toward University
Location

61st was a station on the Chicago Transit Authority's Green Line. The station was located at 316 East 61st Street in the Washington Park neighborhood of Chicago. 61st was located south of 58th, which opened and closed at the same time as 61st, and north of King Drive. 61st opened on January 22, 1893; The station closed on January 9, 1994, when the entire Green Line closed for a renovation project, and did not reopen with the rest of the Green Line on May 12, 1996, due to service cuts, The station was later demolished and was located south from the 61st Yard.
