= Jackson Park station (CTA) =

Railway station in Illinois, United States

Jackson Park 1600E 6300S
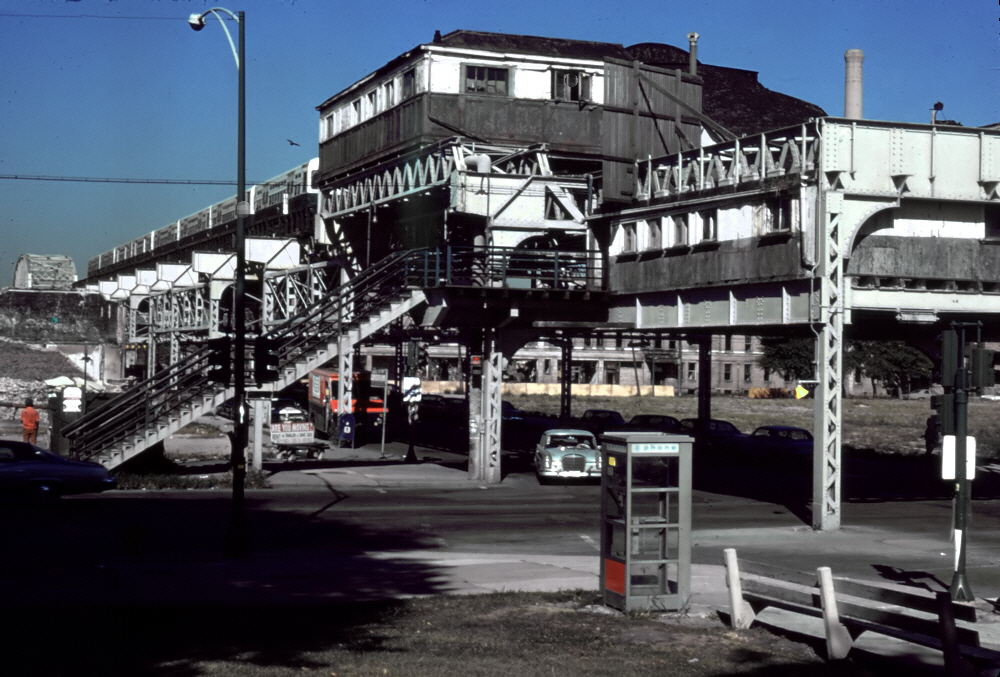
- Jackson Park station in 1972

General information
- Location: 1600 East 63rd Street; Woodlawn, Chicago, Illinois
- Coordinates: 41.78060°N 87.58646°W
- Owner: Chicago Transit Authority
- Line: Jackson Park Branch
- Platforms: 1
- Tracks: 2

Construction
- Structure type: Elevated

History
- Opened: May 12, 1893
- Closed: March 4, 1982
- Former names: Stony Island

Former services
Preceding station	Chicago "L"	Following station
Dorchester Closed 1973 toward Howard	Jackson Park branch	Jackson Park Closed 1893 Terminus
Location

Jackson Park was a station on the Jackson Park Branch of the Chicago "L". The station opened on May 12, 1893, and closed on March 4, 1982, when "L" service on the Jackson Park Branch was suspended due to structural defects in the Dorchester bridge over the Illinois Central Railroad. The station was later demolished. The station served as the terminal of the Jackson Park Branch from October 31, 1893 until March 4, 1982.

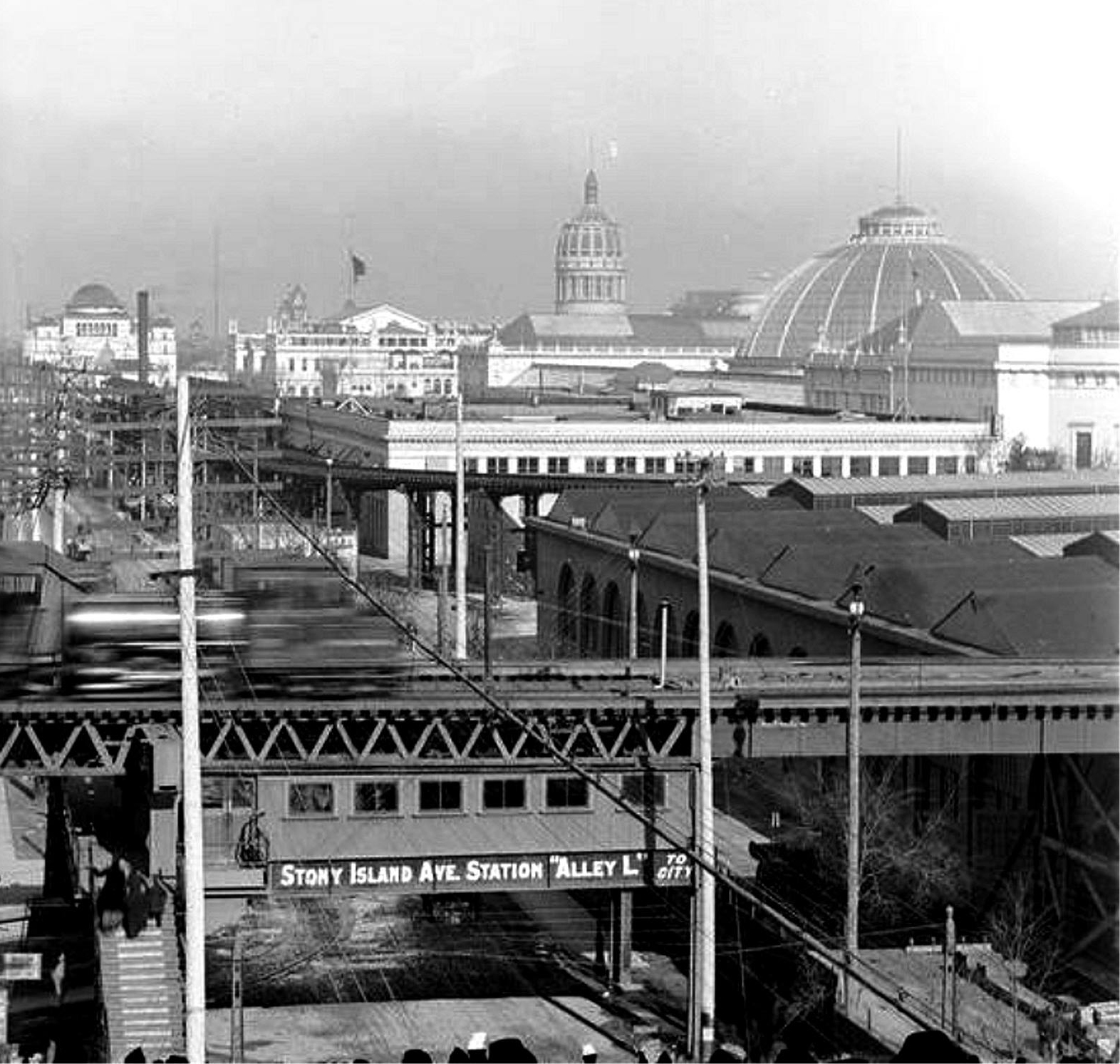
Stony Island station in 1893. The World's Columbian Exhibition is visible in the background.
