= Jackson Park station (World's Fair) =

Defunct train station

Jackson Park (Chicago Junction)
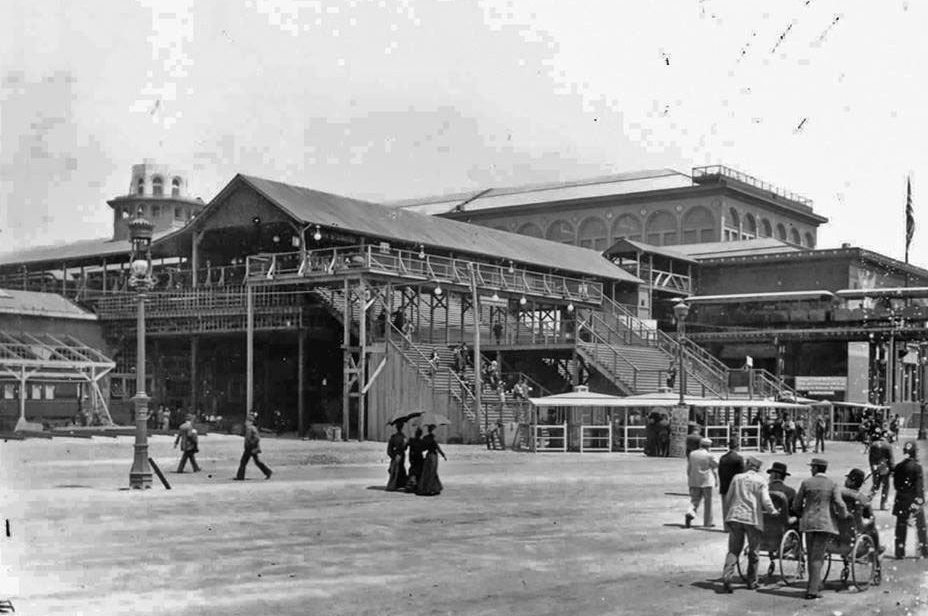

General information
- Location: Jackson Park; Chicago, Illinois
- Coordinates: 41.78°N 87.58522°W
- Line: Jackson Park Branch
- Tracks: 2

Construction
- Structure type: Elevated

History
- Opened: May 1, 1893 (Columbian Intramural Railway); May 12, 1893 (Chicago and South Side Rapid Transit Railroad)
- Closed: October 31, 1893

Former services
Preceding station	Chicago "L"	Following station
Stony Island toward 58th	Jackson Park branch	Terminus
Preceding station	Columbian Intramural Railway	Following station
62nd Street toward North Loop	Main Line	Administration toward South Loop
Location

Jackson Park was a terminal on the Jackson Park Branch of the Chicago "L". The fairgrounds terminal stood on the roof of the Transportation Building's annex, where a same-level transfer platform connected it to the exposition's Intramural Railway. The station opened on May 12, 1893, and closed on October 31, 1893, with the conclusion of the World's Columbian Exposition.

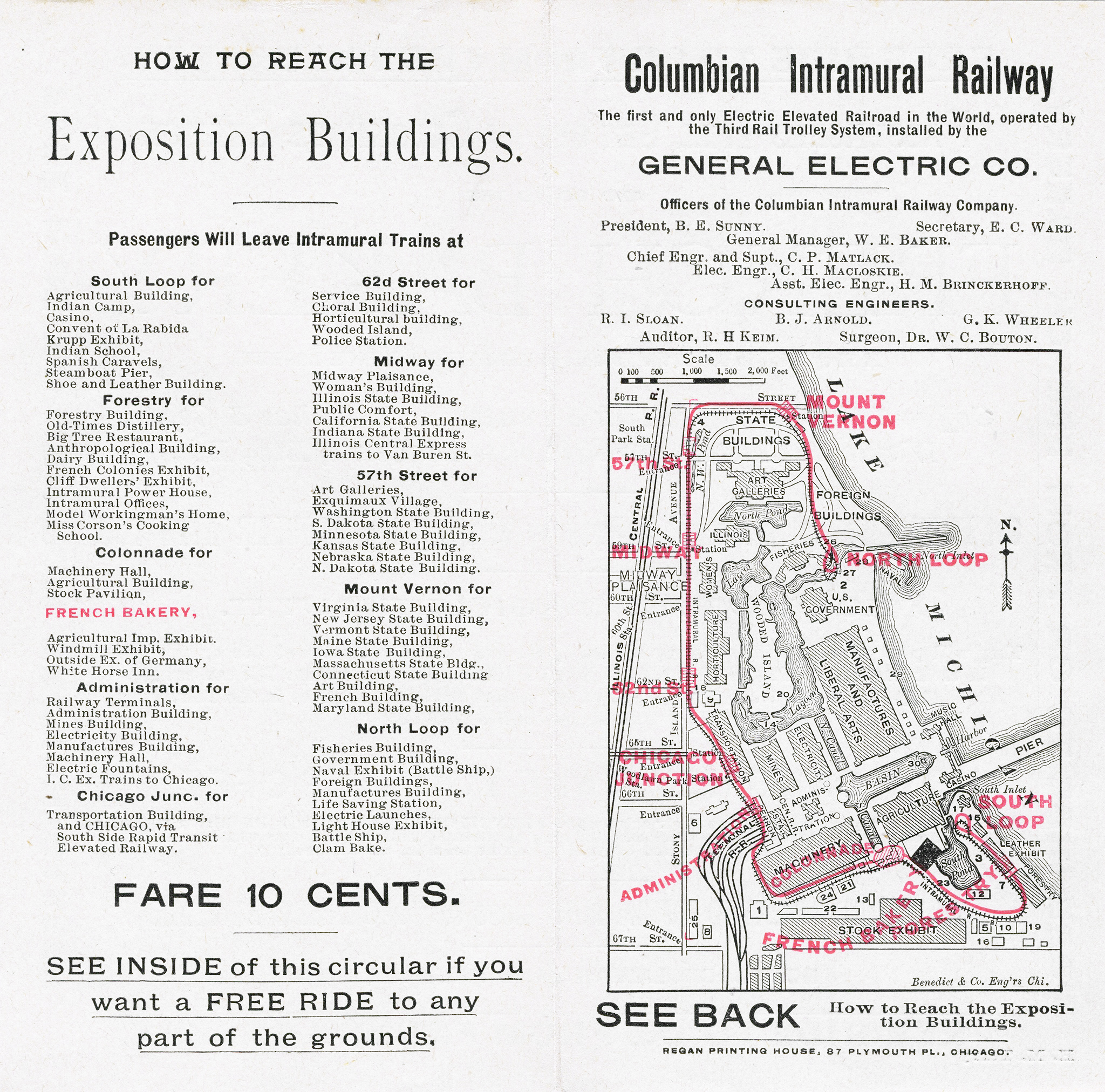
Station was also known as "Chicago Junction" on the Intramural
