= University station (CTA) =

Demolished rapid transit station in Chicago

University 1200E 6300S
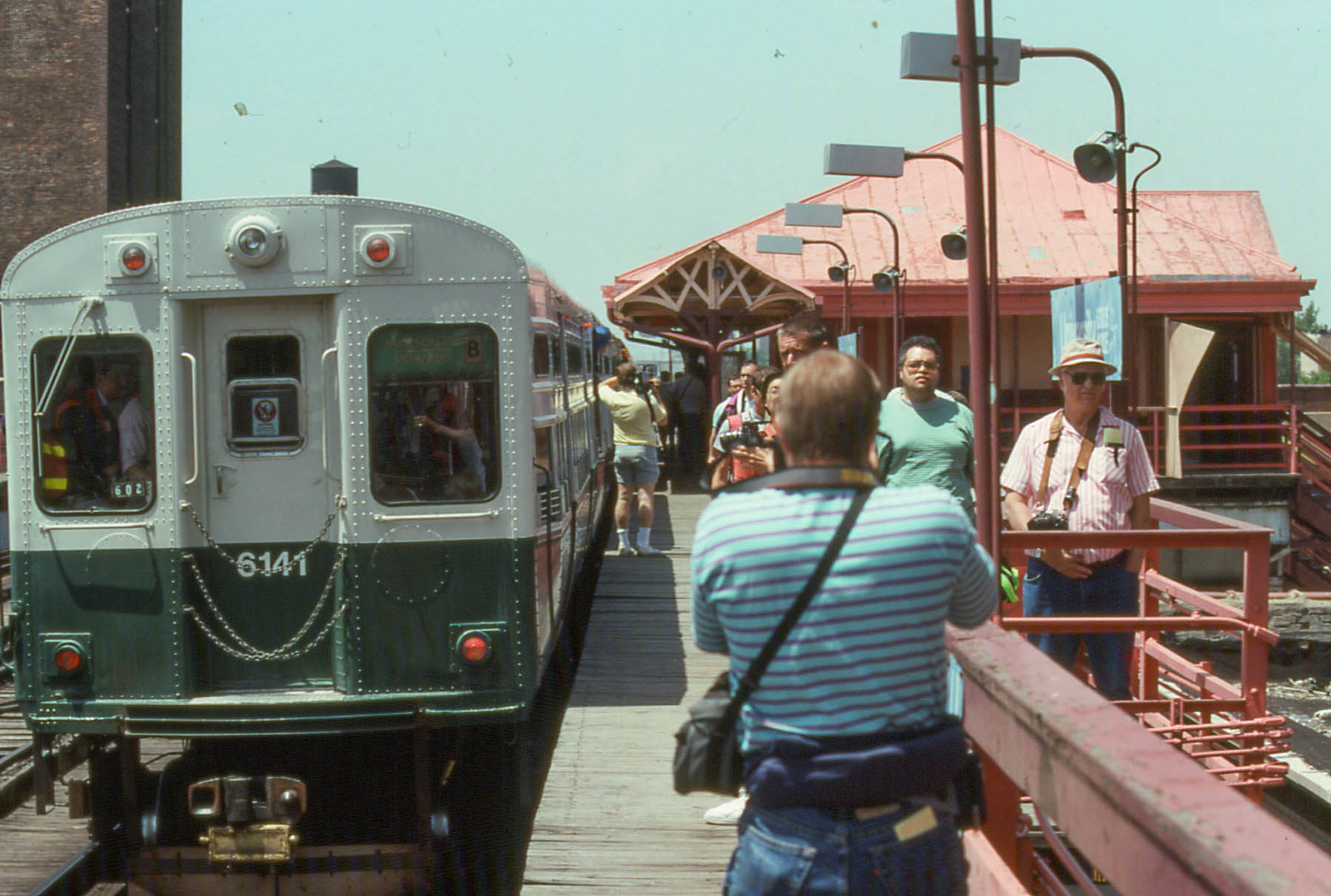
- University station in June 1992

General information
- Location: 1200 East 63rd Street; Chicago, Illinois 60637
- Coordinates: 41.78052°N 87.59622°W
- Owner: Chicago Transit Authority
- Line: Jackson Park Branch
- Platforms: 2 side platforms
- Tracks: 2 tracks

Construction
- Structure type: Elevated

History
- Opened: April 23, 1893; 133 years ago
- Closed: January 9, 1994; 32 years ago
- Former names: Lexington Avenue

Former services
Preceding station	Chicago "L"	Following station
Cottage Grove toward Harlem/Lake	Jackson Park branch	Dorchester Closed 1973 toward Jackson Park
Location

University was a station on the Chicago Transit Authority's Green Line; the station was located at 1200 East 63rd Street in the Woodlawn neighborhood of Chicago. University opened on April 23, 1893. From December 12, 1982, until January 9, 1994, University served as the terminal of the Jackson Park Branch. The station closed on January 9, 1994, when the entire Green Line closed for a renovation project. University did not reopen with the rest of the Green Line on May 12, 1996. University was scheduled to be replaced by a new terminal at Dorchester. Instead the line was cut back to its current terminal at Cottage Grove. The University station was demolished in September 1997, when the City of Chicago demolished the rest of the Jackson Park branch east of Cottage Grove.
