= Cottage Grove station =

Chicago "L" station

Cottage Grove 6300S 800E
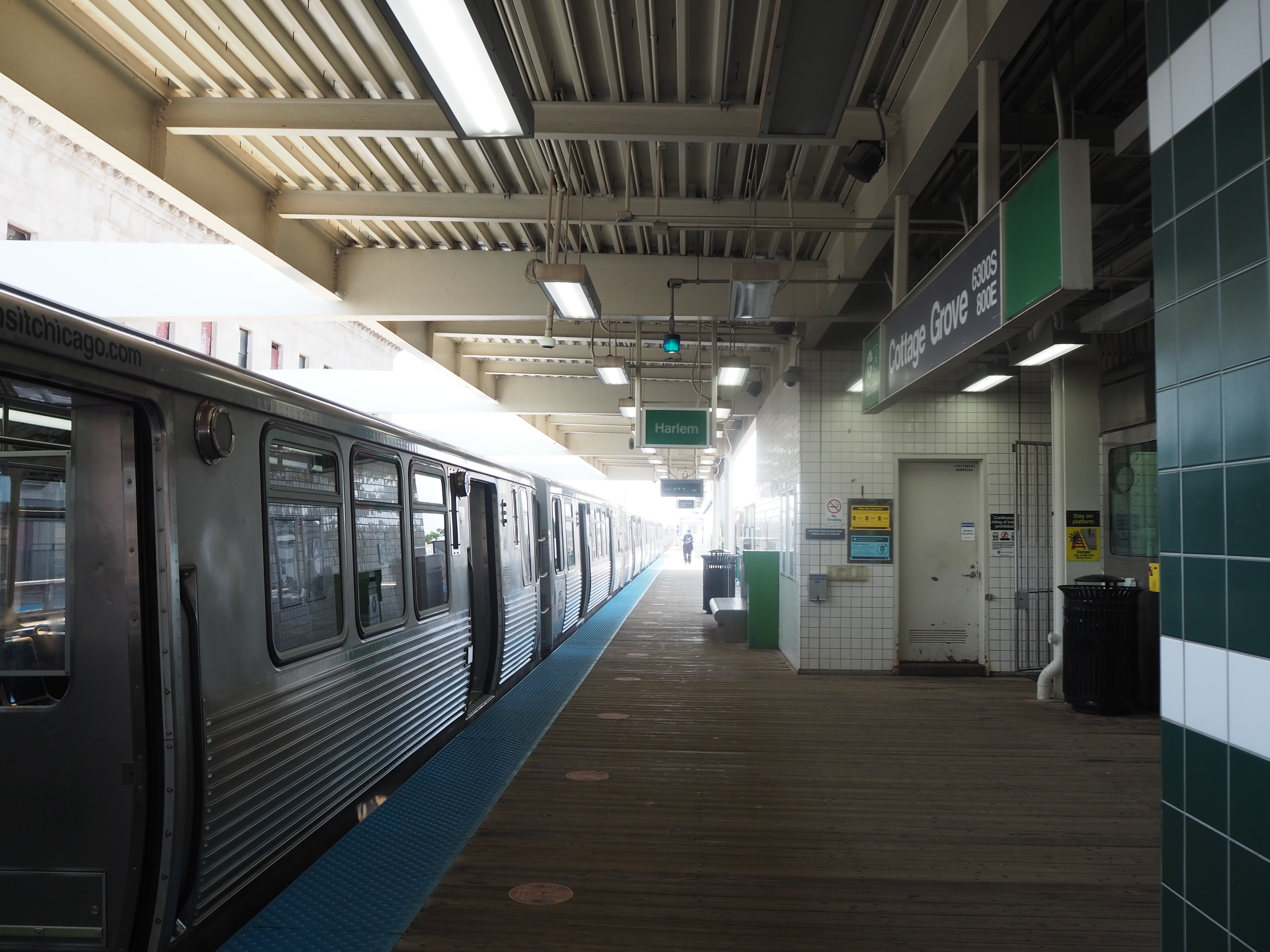

General information
- Location: 800 East 63rd Street; Chicago, Illinois 60637
- Coordinates: 41.780309°N 87.605857°W
- Owner: Chicago Transit Authority
- Line: East 63rd Branch
- Platforms: 2 side platforms
- Tracks: 2 tracks
- Connections: CTA bus

Construction
- Structure type: Elevated
- Accessible: Yes

History
- Opened: April 23, 1893; 133 years ago
- Rebuilt: 1989–1991; 35 years ago
- Former names: East 63rd–Cottage Grove

Passengers
- 2025: 237,706 ▲25.6%

Services
Preceding station	Chicago "L"	Following station
King Drive toward Harlem/Lake	Green Line East 63rd branch	Terminus
Former services
Preceding station	Chicago "L"	Following station
King Drive toward Harlem/Lake	Green Line Jackson Park branch	University Closed 1994 Terminus
Track layout
Location

Cottage Grove, (formerly East 63rd–Cottage Grove) is an "L" station and the terminus of the CTA Green Line's East 63rd branch, located in the Woodlawn neighborhood. The station is situated at 800 East 63rd Street and opened on April 23, 1893.

== History ==
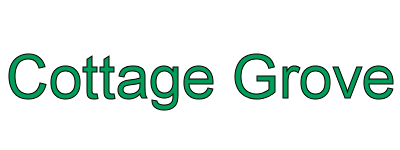
Cottage Grove destination sign

Cottage Grove officially opened in 1893 when the South Side Rapid Transit company extended its line from 39th Street to Jackson Park, just in time for the World's Columbian Exposition. The line was shortened to Stony Island and 63rd after the fair ended. Stony Island remained the terminus of the East 63rd branch for 88 years. However, on March 4, 1982, service east of 61st was suspended due to a defective bridge over the Illinois Central (now Metra Electric) tracks. Service on the East 63rd branch was restored on December 12, 1982, but only as far as the University station. In 1989, Cottage Grove was demolished and replaced with a new station, which opened in 1991. The new station was open for only three years before the entire Green Line closed for a renovation project in 1994.

== Cottage Grove becomes a terminal ==
When the Green Line closed in 1994, the CTA was planning to extend the line from University to a new terminal at Dorchester. The new station would have offered connections to Metra Electric and South Shore Line trains, as well as CTA buses through a brand new bus terminal. However, complaints from Woodlawn residents and Arthur M. Brazier forced a tough decision for the CTA to cut the line back to Cottage Grove. When the line reopened in 1996, Cottage Grove became the terminal of the East 63rd branch. The rest of the line east of Cottage Grove, including the abandoned University station and the partially-built Dorchester station were completely demolished in September 1997.

=== Operations ===
The Cottage Grove station was never intended to be a terminus. Although the station has two platforms, the northern platform is the only one that is used. This is because no fare controls exist on the southern platform, since the station originally only allowed inbound (Harlem/Lake-bound) boarding (a configuration still used by King Drive). For this reason, the southern platform can only be used by trains that continue to the 61st or Lower 63rd Yards. The southern platform is also used by weekday rush hour trains that run empty to Garfield and back to Cottage Grove or to Ashland/63rd (this is done to allow a quick and easy transfer to another branch at Garfield). The one-track setup works for Cottage Grove because the station only sees trains arrive/depart every 20–25 minutes. Since the East 63rd branch was torn down all the way to Cottage Grove, no turnaround tracks exist east of the station. Trains needing to switch to the northern platform must use the crossover tracks just west of the station.

== Bus connections ==
CTA

- 4 Cottage Grove (Owl Service)
- X4 Cottage Grove Express (weekday rush hours only)
- 63 63rd (Owl Service)

== Image gallery ==
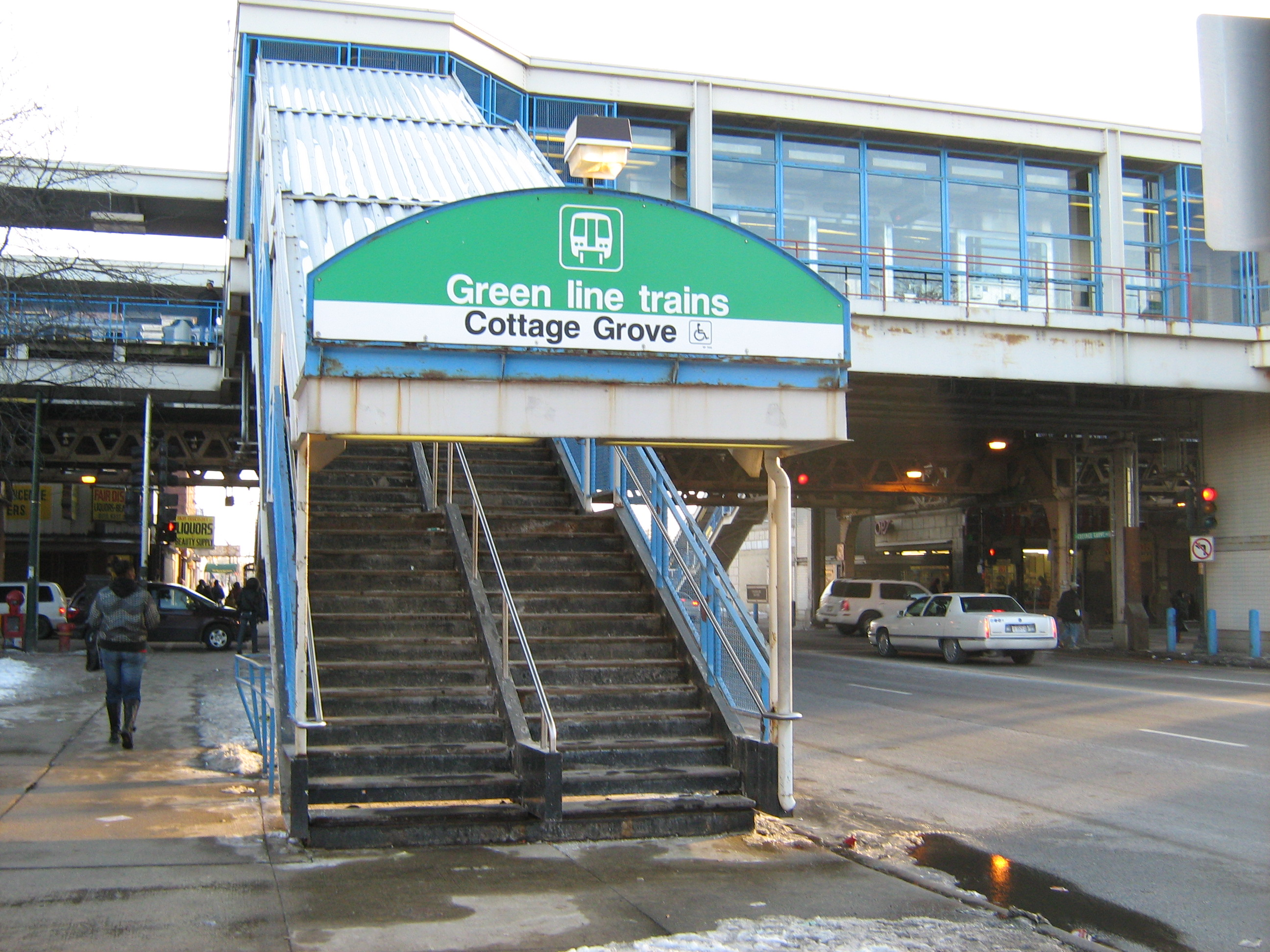
Station entrance.

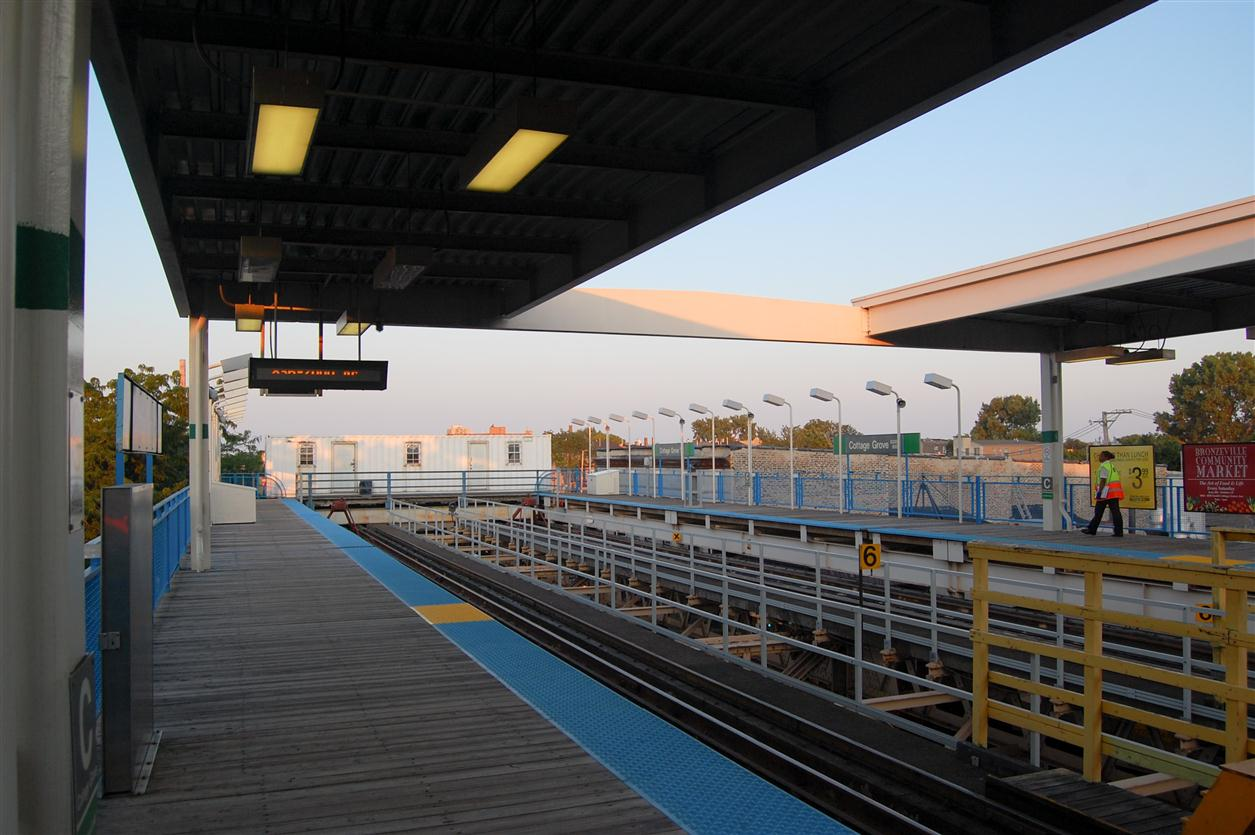
End of the line since 1996.
