= Arthur M. Brazier =

American Pentecostal bishop and community organizer (1921–2010)

Bishop Arthur M. Brazier
- Bishop
- Church: Apostolic Church of God (Chicago)
- In office: 1960–2008 (pastor)
- Predecessor: Ahart Medders
- Successor: Dr. Byron T. Brazier

Personal details
- Born: July 22, 1921 Chicago, Illinois, U.S.
- Died: October 22, 2010 (aged 89) Chicago, Illinois, U.S.
- Denomination: Oneness Pentecostalism
- Spouse: Esther Isabelle (Holmes) Brazier
- Children: Dr. Byron T. Brazier; Lola Hillman; Janice Dortch; Rosalyn Shepherd
- Occupation: Pastor, bishop, community organizer, author

Arthur M. Brazier (July 22, 1921 – October 22, 2010) was an American Oneness Pentecostal bishop, pastor, and community organizer in Chicago. He served as pastor of the Apostolic Church of God in the Woodlawn neighborhood from 1960 until his retirement in 2008, overseeing major building expansions and membership growth.

Brazier was also a leading figure in Chicago’s mid-20th-century community organizing, including the founding leadership of The Woodlawn Organization (TWO), which became a major force in neighborhood advocacy and civil-rights-era civic life on the South Side.

== Early life and education ==
Brazier was born in Chicago on July 22, 1921, and grew up on the South Side. Public tributes report that he attended Douglas Elementary School and Wendell Phillips Academy High School, later completing a high school correspondence course and night school while working.

He graduated from Moody Bible Institute in 1956 after attending at night while employed as a mail carrier for the United States Postal Service.

== Military service ==
During World War II, Brazier served in the United States Army, including duty in the China–Burma–India theater; later public recognitions credited him with two battle stars for the North Burma and Central Burma campaigns.

== Ministry ==
According to official and legislative tributes, Brazier felt called to ministry in the late 1940s and began formal ministerial preparation in the 1950s while still working for the postal service. He became pastor of the Universal Church of Christ in 1952.

In 1960, following leadership changes at the Apostolic Church of God, Brazier was asked to become its pastor; his congregation merged with ACOG, and he began a decades-long pastorate in Woodlawn.

=== Pastor of the Apostolic Church of God (1960–2008) ===
Brazier served as pastor of the Apostolic Church of God from 1960 until retiring in 2008. ACOG’s institutional history and legislative tributes credit his tenure with rapid growth and multiple building expansions, including:

- construction of a new sanctuary at 63rd Street and Kenwood Avenue (opened 1977);
- later expansion to a larger campus at 63rd Street and Dorchester Avenue with a 3,000-seat sanctuary and television facilities (completed 1992);
- subsequent additions such as a banquet-hall wing (1998) and a youth and family center (opened 2007).

State and city tributes described the membership growth during his leadership as increasing from roughly 100 members at the time of the 1960 merger to more than 20,000 by the 2000s.

Brazier handed leadership of the church to his son, Dr. Byron T. Brazier, who succeeded him in 2008.

=== Episcopal leadership ===
Brazier served as a diocesan bishop in the Pentecostal Assemblies of the World (PAW). A 2008 Illinois House resolution stated that he served as diocesan of the 6th Episcopal District (Illinois), overseeing more than 80 churches, for 30 years. A 1994 Congressional Record proclamation also referenced his election as a bishop in 1976 and identified him as an episcopal leader in the PAW.

== Community organizing and civil rights ==
During the 1960s, Brazier became prominent in local civil-rights and neighborhood advocacy. Illinois legislative and University of Chicago accounts describe his partnership with community organizer Saul Alinsky and his leadership role in The Woodlawn Organization (TWO), a coalition that sought greater community control and opposed aspects of the University of Chicago’s expansion into Woodlawn in the early 1960s.

TWO became one of the best-known examples of Alinsky-style community organizing in Chicago; it developed a citywide profile through campaigns involving housing, redevelopment, and neighborhood institutions.

A 2008 Illinois House resolution further stated that Brazier met Martin Luther King Jr. in 1966 and protested with him in Chicago against segregated housing and schools, while also supporting community programs intended to reduce violence and strengthen neighborhood stability.

== Civic leadership ==
Brazier held multiple civic and public-service roles. The Public Building Commission of Chicago reported that he was appointed to its Board of Commissioners on August 28, 1986, by Mayor Harold Washington with the advice and consent of the Chicago City Council; he served until his death and chaired the Commission’s Audit Committee.

== Media ministry ==
By the 1990s, Brazier and ACOG were associated with broadcast and radio teaching. A proclamation entered into the Congressional Record in 1994 described ACOG’s “Saving Grace Ministries” as airing on television (including Chicago Channel 26 and Milwaukee Channel 55) and referenced a Bible teaching hour on WYCA radio, alongside other church ministries.

== Writings ==
Brazier was the author of several works. A 2008 Illinois House resolution listed three titles:

- Black Self-Determination;
- Saved by Grace and Grace Alone;
- From Milk to Meat.

His best-known publication is Black Self-Determination: The Story of the Woodlawn Organization (1969), a contemporaneous account of TWO and its approach to neighborhood organizing and redevelopment.

== Transportation advocacy ==
In the 1990s, Brazier supported proposals related to transit infrastructure in Woodlawn. In 1994, reporting on community debate over the future of the CTA’s Jackson Park “L” branch noted that Brazier argued for demolishing the portion east of Cottage Grove, linking it to neighborhood blight and redevelopment concerns. In 1996 the CTA Board ultimately voted to tear down the three-quarter mile section of the elevated structure. Today, Cottage Grove is the eastern terminus of the Green Line, though some have called for the restoration of the elevated service, particularly in the wake of the Obama Presidential Center opening.

== Personal life ==
Brazier was married to Esther Isabelle (Holmes) Brazier. His son, Dr. Byron T. Brazier, later became senior pastor of the Apostolic Church of God.

== Death and legacy ==
Brazier died on October 22, 2010, at age 89. Following his death, the Public Building Commission of Chicago adopted a formal resolution honoring him as a civic and religious leader and recognizing his decades of service on the Commission.

Brazier is interred with his wife, Esther Isabelle Brazier (who died on March 19, 2022), at Oak Woods Cemetery in Chicago, IL.

== See also ==
- Apostolic Church of God
- The Woodlawn Organization
- Pentecostal Assemblies of the World
- Garfield Thomas Haywood
- The Civil Rights Movement
- Operation Rainbow PUSH
- Bishop Robert C. Lawson
