= East 63rd branch =

Segment of the Chicago "L"

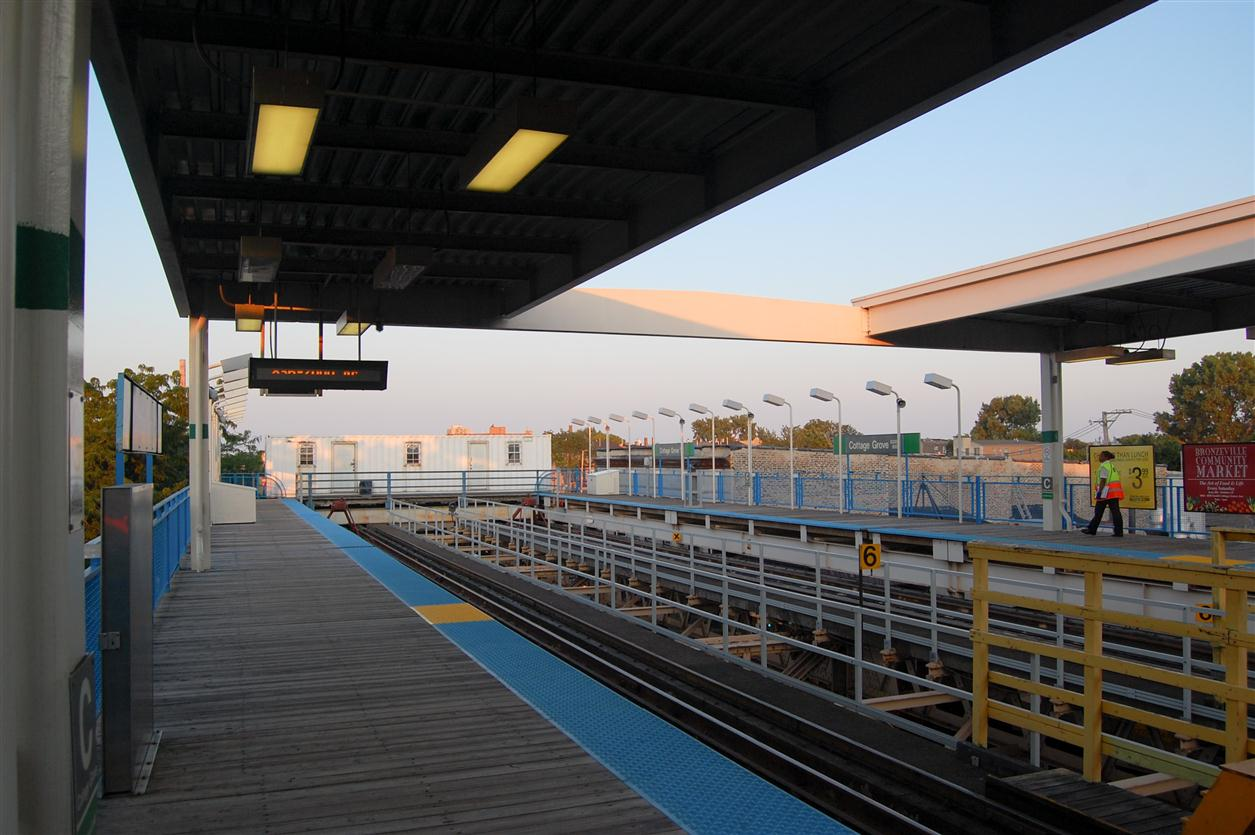
- The East 63rd branch terminates at Cottage Grove.

Overview
- Status: Operational
- Locale: Chicago, Illinois, United States
- Termini: King Drive; Cottage Grove
- Stations: 2

Service
- Type: Rapid transit
- System: Chicago "L"
- Services: Green
- Operator(s): Chicago Transit Authority (1947–present); Chicago Rapid Transit Company (1924–1947); South Side Elevated Railroad (1893–1924)
- Rolling stock: 5000-series
- Daily ridership: 1,427 (average weekday 2019)

History
- Opened: 1893

Technical
- Line length: 1.5 mi (2.4 km)
- Character: Elevated
- Track gauge: 4 ft 8 1/2 in (1,435 mm) standard gauge
- Electrification: Third rail, 600 V DC

The East 63rd branch, formerly known as the Jackson Park branch, is a 1.5-mile (2.4 km) long branch of the Chicago "L" operated as part the Green Line by the Chicago Transit Authority, serving the Woodlawn neighborhood of Chicago, Illinois.

== History ==
The first station on the East 63rd branch, 61st Street, opened January 22, 1893. Service was extended to Madison Avenue (later renamed Dorchester) on April 23, 1893, and to Jackson Park on May 12, 1893, to serve the World's Columbian Exposition, which was held in Jackson Park. On October 31, 1893, the World's Columbian Exposition ended and the Jackson Park station was closed. Stony Island was then made the terminus and was renamed Jackson Park.

On March 4, 1982, structural defects in the Jackson Park branch's bridge over the Illinois Central Railroad forced its closure south of the 61st street stop. When the branch reopened on December 12, 1982, service was only restored as far as the University stop. On January 9, 1994, the Green Line closed for renovation. When the line reopened on May 12, 1996, the Cottage Grove stop was the new terminal, and the Jackson Park branch was renamed the East 63rd branch. On September 27, 1997, the portion of the branch east of Cottage Grove was demolished with less than 24 hours public notice.

== Station listing ==
Station	Location	Notes
61st	61st Street and Prairie Avenue	Opened January 22, 1893, closed January 9, 1994; demolished.
King Drive	Martin Luther King Jr. Drive and 63rd Street	
Cottage Grove	Cottage Grove Avenue and 63rd Street	
University	University Avenue and 63rd Street	Opened April 23, 1893, closed January 9, 1994; demolished 1997.
Dorchester	Dorchester Avenue and 63rd Street	Opened April 23, 1893 as "Madison," closed January 13, 1973; demolished 1997.
Jackson Park	Stony Island Avenue and 63rd Street	Opened May 12, 1893, as "Stony Island" closed March 4, 1982; demolished.
Jackson Park	Hayes Drive and Cornell Drive	World's Columbian Exposition Fair Grounds. Transfer point to the Intramural Railway. Only opened May 12 to October 31, 1893.
