= 29th station =

Former Chicago "L" station

29TH 2900S 1E
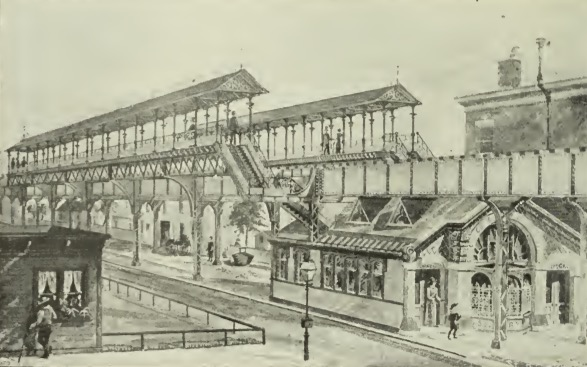
- The station as it appeared in 1892

General information
- Location: 14 East 29th Street; Chicago, Illinois
- Coordinates: 41.84197°N 87.62616°W
- Owner: Chicago Transit Authority
- Line: South Side Elevated
- Platforms: 2 side platforms
- Tracks: 2 before 1907, 3 afterwards

Construction
- Structure type: Elevated

History
- Opened: June 6, 1892
- Closed: August 1, 1949
- Rebuilt: 1907

Passengers
- 1948: 133,052 ▼8.69%
- Rank: 193 out of 223

Former services
Preceding station	Chicago "L"	Following station
26th toward Loop (Adams/Wabash) or Congress Terminal	South Side Elevated	31st toward 58th
Location

29th (Note: This station was located on East 29th Street. Although it would have been referred to as "29th Street" or "Twenty-ninth street" at the time of its opening, convention has developed in Chicago to drop street suffixes such as "Street" and "Avenue" from rapid transit station names. This has its roots as early as 1898 and was widespread by the time of the station's 1949 closure.) was a rapid transit station on the Chicago "L"'s South Side main line. Originally constructed by the South Side Elevated Railroad company, it was one of the original ten stations opened on the Chicago "L", beginning service on June 6, 1892. The South Side Elevated Railroad merged operations with three other companies to form Chicago Elevated Railways (CER) in 1911, before merging outright with them in 1924 to form the Chicago Rapid Transit Company (CRT). Public ownership came to the "L" in 1947 with the Chicago Transit Authority (CTA).

After the CER merger, the South Side and North Side main lines were through-routed in various patterns with their various branches, and the CTA took to streamlining "L" service on the two simultaneously. The least-patronized regular-service station on the South Side main line for the majority of its existence, 29th closed alongside several other North-South stations on August 1, 1949.

The station, and others like it, had two wooden side platforms that originally surrounded two tracks. Originally having brick station houses at street level, 29th and the other stations on its part of the main line had their station houses demolished in 1907 and replaced with mezzanines to open up alley access below the tracks in exchange for being permitted to construct a third express track.

== History ==
The South Side Elevated Railroad was incorporated in 1888 with the goal of linking downtown with the Indiana state line. The first section of its main line, and the first rapid transit in Chicago, opened on June 6, 1892, between Congress and 39th Streets. Ten stations opened that day, one of which was on 29th Street. The Railroad quickly expanded southwards; by the end of the year, it reached south to 55th Street, and it reached Jackson Park by May 1893, in time for the World's Columbian Exposition that year.

A third express track was desired, and a franchise was awarded in 1907. In exchange for this, however, the railroad had to demolish the station houses north of Indiana station, including 29th's, and replace them with simpler mezzanine facilities in order to clear alleys that had been blocked by the buildings.

The railroad merged with three others on the Chicago "L" to form Chicago Elevated Railways (CER) in 1911, although it kept its legal separate identity. CER through-routed lines branching from the South Side and North Side main lines together, linking them through the Loop. CER continued until the companies were formally merged into the Chicago Rapid Transit Company (CRT) in 1924. Although municipal ownership of transit had been a hotly-contested issue for half a century, the publicly owned Chicago Transit Authority (CTA) would not be created until 1945, and would not assume operation of the "L" until October 1, 1947.

The CTA aimed to economize service on the "L", which was suffering from declining ridership, and closed many stations on the North-South lines on August 1, 1949. 29th, which had long been the least-patronized station in the area, was one of them. Today 29th Street is served by the South Side Main Line (Which is now part of the Green Line)

== Station details ==
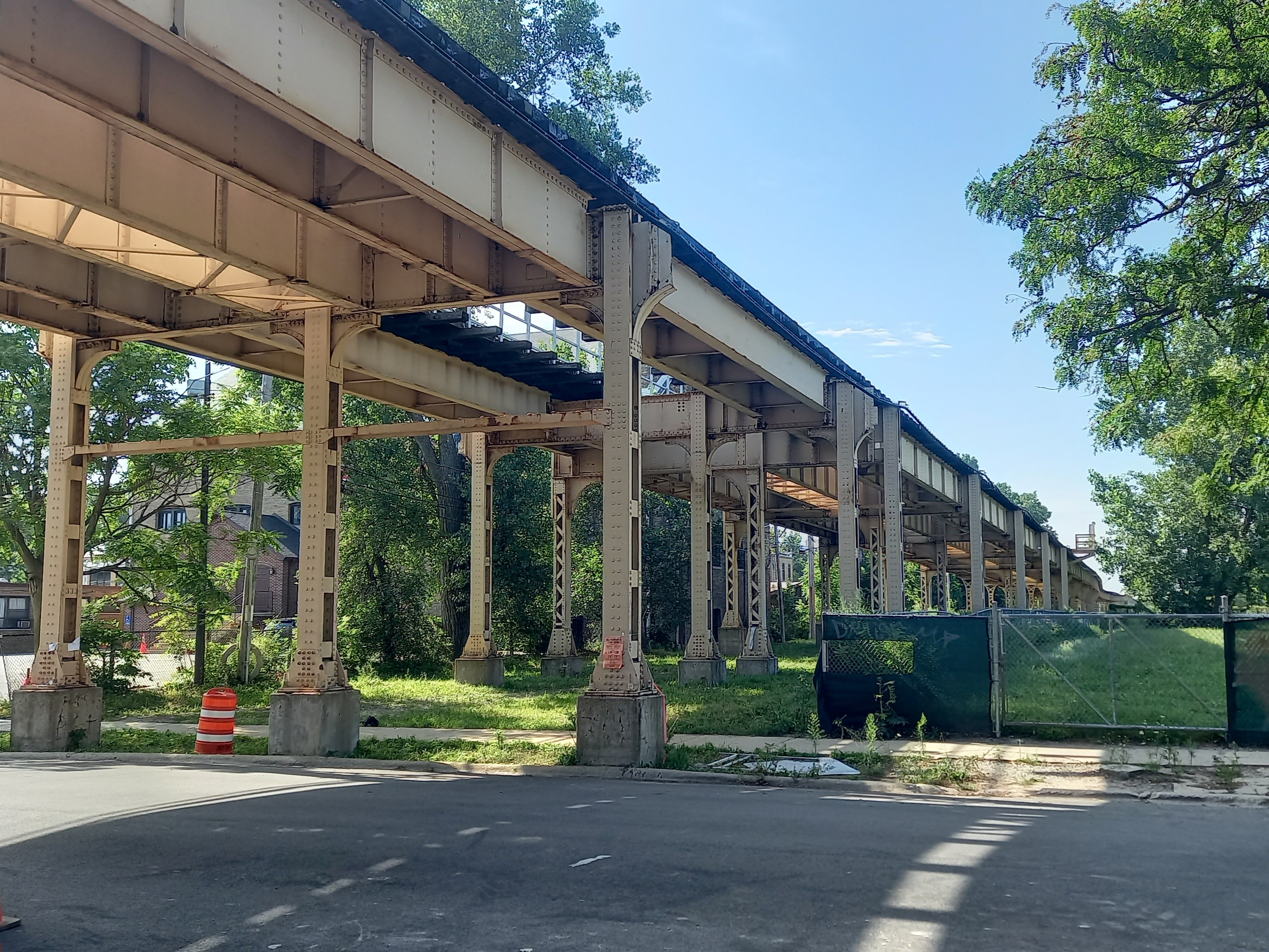
Location of the demolished station, 2025

=== Operations and connections ===
A streetcar ran on State Street parallel to the "L".

=== Ridership ===
Between 1900 and 1949, 29th was the station on the main line with the lowest ridership other than the overflow-use Congress Terminal every year except for 1900–1905, when stations on the far south and what would become the Jackson Park branch had that distinction, and 1911 and 1920–1926, when 39th underserved it. The number of passengers at 29th peaked at 549,776 in 1903, when it was the lowest-ridership station on the main line except for 61st on the Jackson Park extension, and last exceeded 200,000 in 1928. These low numbers were typical of the main line north of Indiana, whose busiest stations of 22nd and 35th never served more than a million passengers a year after 1927. By comparison, every station between 43rd and 58th, inclusive, served at least one million passengers a year throughout the 1940s, and Cottage Grove served over two million passengers each year in that time.

In its last full year of operation, 1948, 29th serviced 133,052 passengers, an 8.69 percent decrease from the 145,714 in 1947. During the part of 1949 when it was open, it served 67,873 riders. Its 1948 performance made it have the 193rd-highest ridership of the 223 "L" stations that collected such statistics at the beginning of the year; of the stations on the south side routes, it was fourth to the Congress Terminal and Parnell and Princeton on the Englewood branch in its disuse. In 1947, it had been the 199th-busiest of 222 such "L" stations, with the same relative performance for south side stations (Note: Several stations on the Niles Center and Westchester branches were permanently unstaffed and thus did not collect ridership statistics. Several stations closed on the "L" during 1948. Exchange station on the Stock Yards branch lacked statistics for 1947 but returned in 1948.)

== Works cited ==
- CTA Rail Entrance, Annual Traffic, 1900–1979 (Report). Chicago: Chicago Transit Authority. October 1, 1979.
- Moffat, Bruce G. (1995). The "L": The Development of Chicago's Rapid Transit System, 1888–1932. Chicago: Central Electric Railfans' Association. ISBN 0-915348-30-6.
- "R. L. Polk & Co.'s Chicago Street and Avenue Guide" (PDF). Polk's Chicago Directory 1923. Chicago: R. L. Polk & Co. 1923. pp. 193–228 – via ChicagoAncestors.org.
