= 18th station (CTA South Side Elevated) =

Former Chicago "L" Station (1892–1949)

18TH 1800S 1E
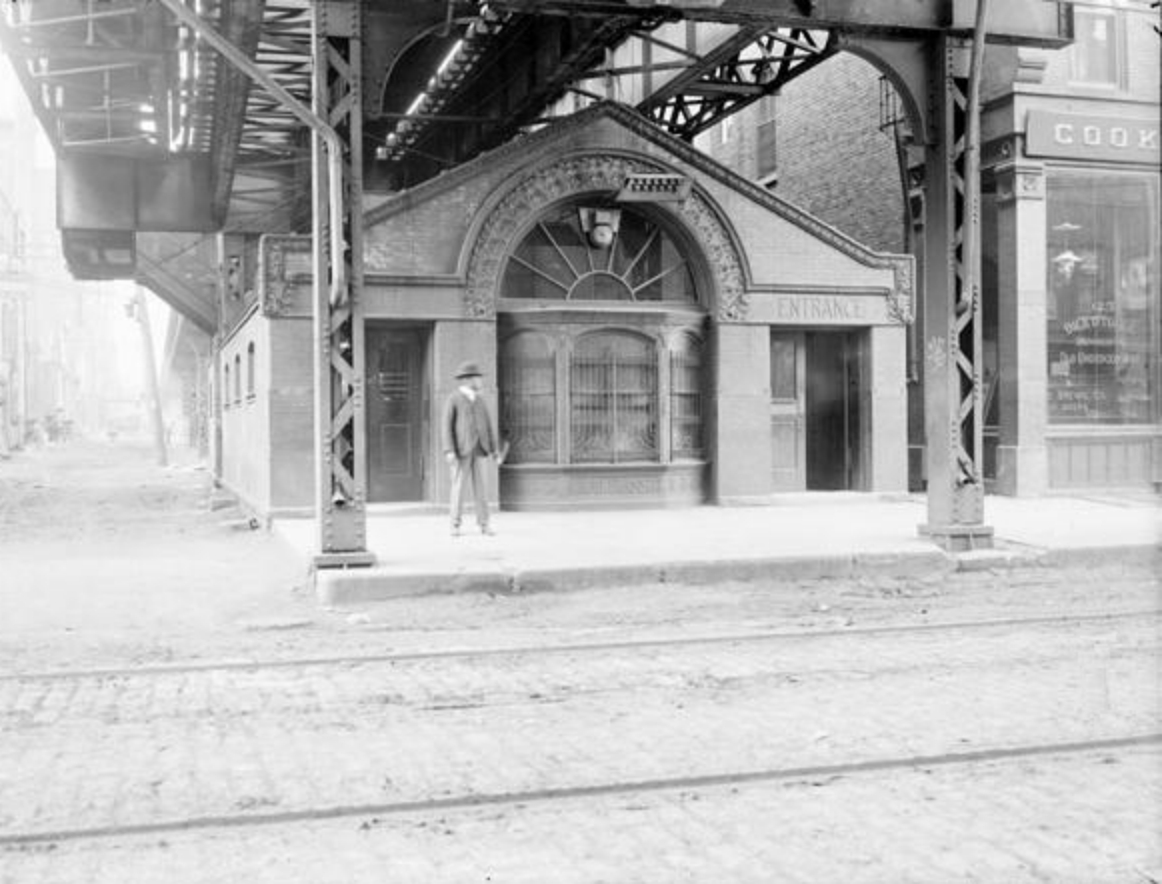

General information
- Location: 18th Street and Wabash Avenue; Chicago, Illinois
- Coordinates: 41.85785°N 87.62650°W
- Owner: Chicago Transit Authority
- Line: South Side Elevated
- Platforms: 2 side platforms
- Tracks: 2 tracks

Construction
- Structure type: Elevated

History
- Opened: June 6, 1892
- Closed: August 1, 1949
- Rebuilt: 1907

Former services
Preceding station	Chicago "L"	Following station
Roosevelt toward Loop (Adams/Wabash) or Congress Terminal	South Side Elevated	Cermak toward 58th
Location

18th Street was a station on the Chicago Transit Authority's South Side main line, which is now part of the Green Line. The station was located at 18th Street and Wabash Avenue in the Near South Side neighborhood of Chicago. 18th was situated south of Roosevelt/Wabash and north of Cermak. 18th opened on June 6, 1892, and closed on August 1, 1949.

== History ==
The South Side Elevated Railroad, the first rapid transit company in Chicago, opened on June 6, 1892, with ten stations, one of which was located on 18th Street. Eight of the ten stations on the line were built with street-level station houses. (Note: The Congress Terminal and 12th Street lines were located above the alley and were respectively served by an adjacent building and a mezzanine.)

In 1907, the railroad was allowed by the city to construct a third track for express operations. In exchange, it promised to demolish the station houses north of 43rd Street, including all of the original street-level station houses, and replace them with mezzanines in order to clear the alleyway below the track.
