= 33rd station =

Former Chicago rapid transit station

33RD 3300S 1E
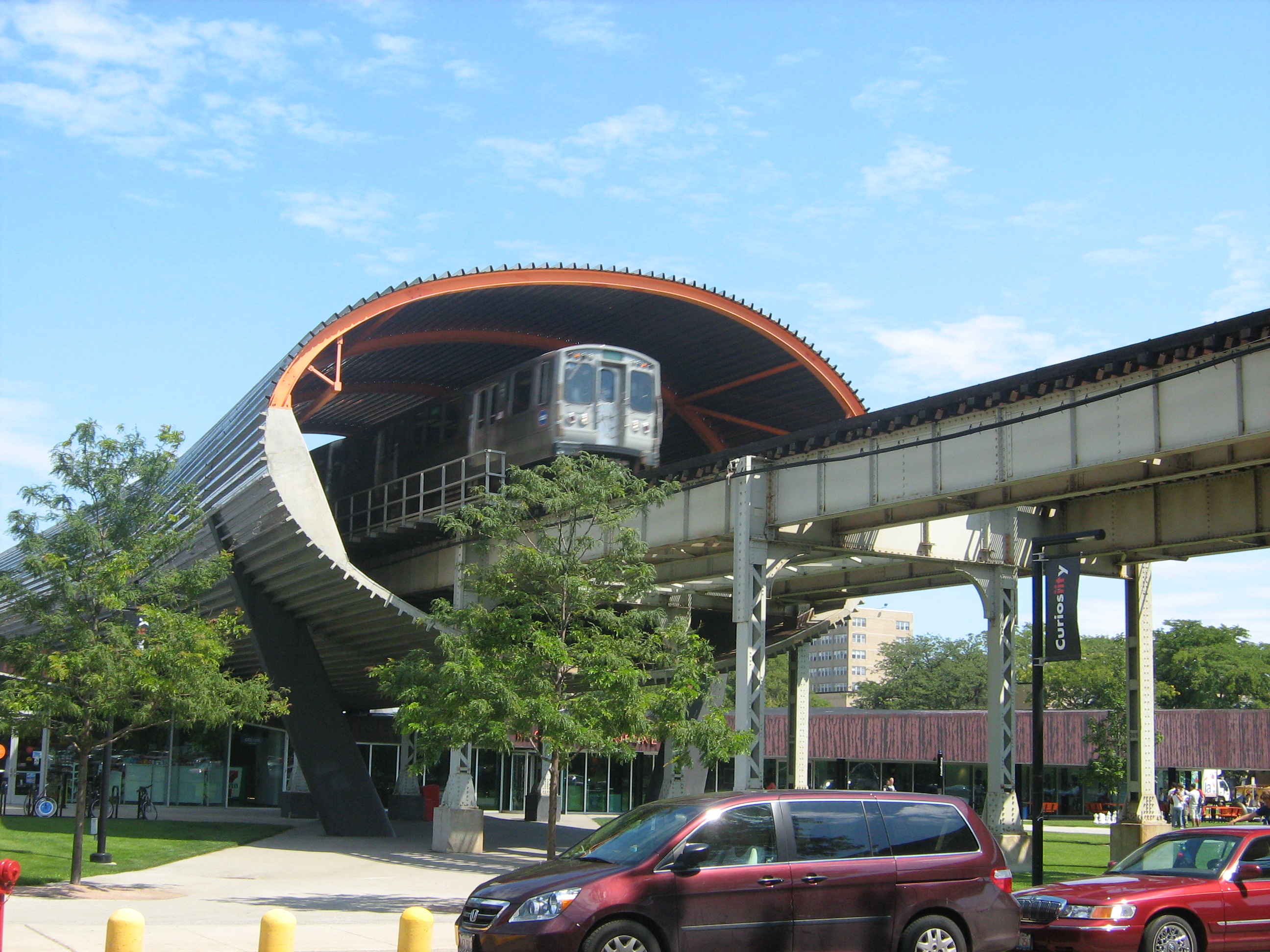
- Location of the demolished station, 2008

General information
- Location: 33rd Street and Wabash Avenue; Chicago, Illinois
- Coordinates: 41.83467°N 87.62594°W
- Owner: Chicago Transit Authority
- Line: South Side Elevated
- Platforms: 2 side platforms
- Tracks: 2 tracks

Construction
- Structure type: Elevated

History
- Opened: June 6, 1892
- Closed: August 1, 1949
- Rebuilt: 1907

Former services
Preceding station	Chicago "L"	Following station
31st Street toward Loop (Adams/Wabash) or Congress Terminal	South Side Elevated	35th Street toward 58th
Location

33rd was a station on the Chicago Transit Authority's South Side Main Line, which is now part of the Green Line. The station was located at 33rd Street and Wabash Avenue in the Douglas neighborhood of Chicago. 33rd was situated south of 31st and north of Tech–35th, which is now named 35th–Bronzeville–IIT. 33rd opened on June 6, 1892, and closed on August 1, 1949. Portions of the station remained in service as part of Tech–35th until September 25, 1961.
