= 26th station =

26TH 2600S 1E
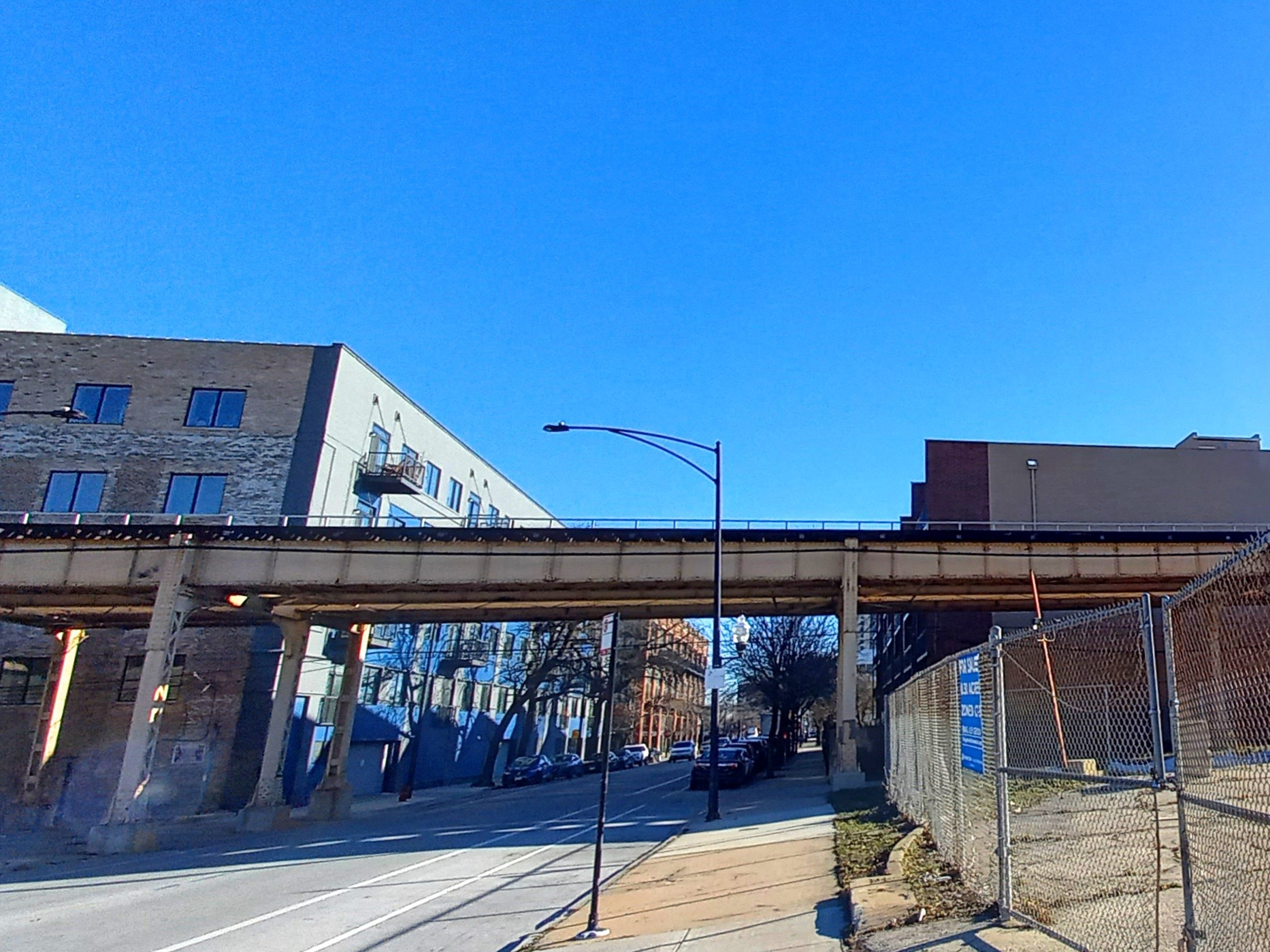
- Location of the demolished station, 2022

General information
- Location: 26th Street and Wabash Avenue; Chicago, Illinois
- Coordinates: 41.84560°N 87.62621°W
- Owner: Chicago Transit Authority
- Line: South Side Elevated
- Platforms: 2 side platforms
- Tracks: 2 tracks

Construction
- Structure type: Elevated

History
- Opened: June 6, 1892
- Closed: August 1, 1949
- Rebuilt: 1907

Former services
Preceding station	Chicago "L"	Following station
Cermak toward Loop (Adams/Wabash) or Congress Terminal	South Side Elevated	29th Street toward 58th
Location

26th was a station on the Chicago Transit Authority's South Side Main Line, which is now part of the Green Line. The station was located at 26th Street and Wabash Avenue in the Near South Side neighborhood of Chicago. 26th was situated south of Cermak and north of 29th. 26th opened on June 6, 1892, and closed on August 1, 1949.
