= 31st station =

Former Chicago "L" station (1892–1949)

31ST 3100S 1E
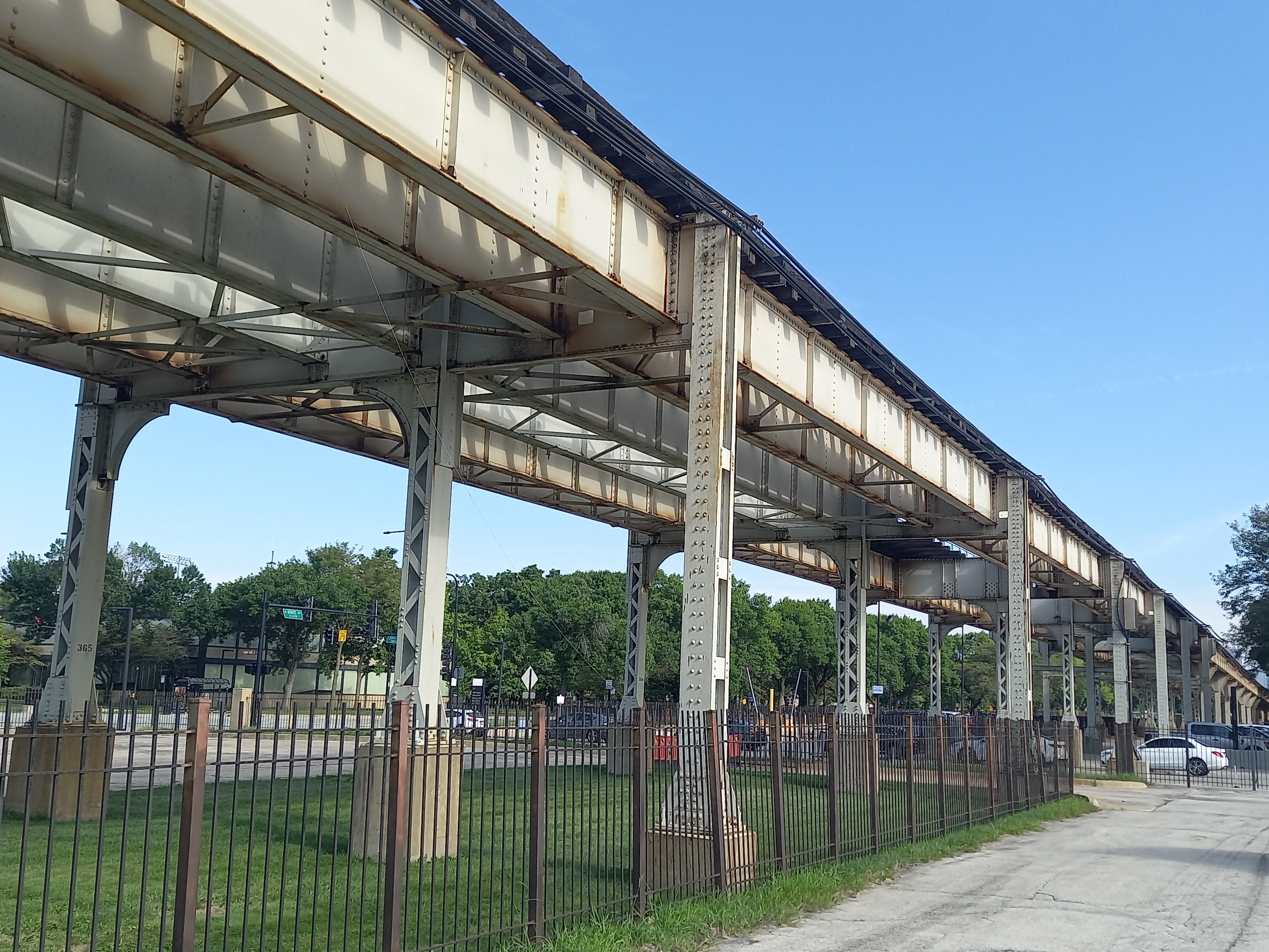
- Location of the demolished station, 2025

General information
- Location: 31st Street near State Street; Chicago, Illinois
- Coordinates: 41.8383°N 87.6260°W
- Owner: Chicago Transit Authority
- Line: South Side Elevated
- Platforms: 2 side platforms
- Tracks: 2 tracks

Construction
- Structure type: Elevated

History
- Opened: June 6, 1892
- Closed: August 1, 1949
- Rebuilt: 1907

Former services
Preceding station	Chicago "L"	Following station
29th Street toward Loop (Adams/Wabash) or Congress Terminal	South Side Elevated	33rd Street toward 58th
Location

31st was a station on the Chicago Transit Authority's South Side Main Line, which is now part of the Green Line. The station was located at 31st Street near State Street in the Douglas neighborhood of Chicago. 31st was situated south of 29th and north of 33rd. 31st opened on June 6, 1892, and closed on August 1, 1949.
