= LaSalle/Van Buren station =

Chicago "L" station

LaSalle/Van Buren 140W 400S
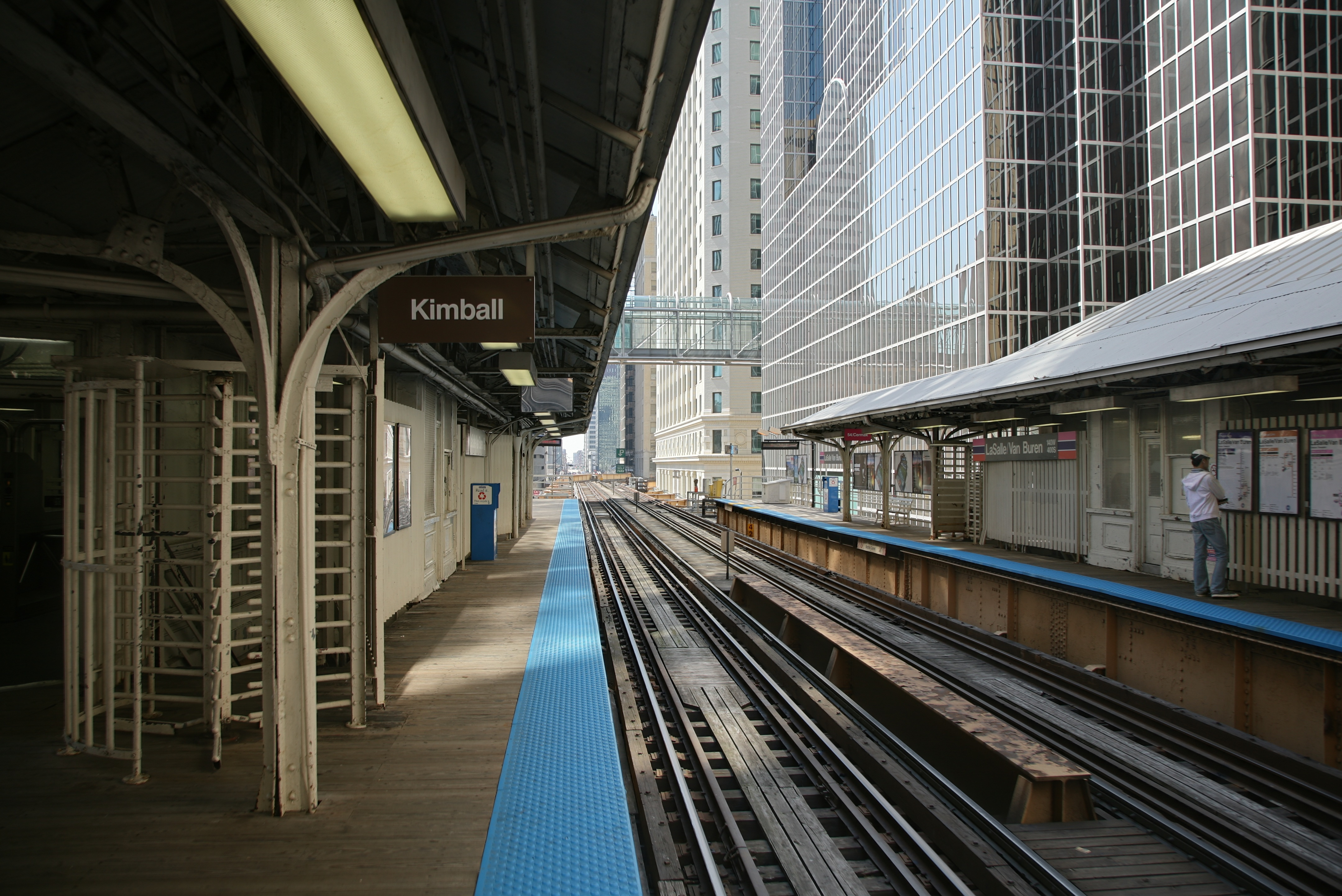
- Outer Loop platform

General information
- Location: 121 West Van Buren Street; Chicago, Illinois 60605
- Coordinates: 41.8768°N 87.631739°W
- Owner: Chicago Transit Authority
- Line: Loop Elevated
- Platforms: 2 side platforms
- Tracks: 2
- Connections: at LaSalle Street

Construction
- Structure type: Elevated
- Accessible: No

History
- Opened: October 3, 1897; 128 years ago
- Former names: Pacific Avenue

Passengers
- 2025: 551,847 ▲14.6% (CTA)

Services
Preceding station	Chicago "L"	Following station
Quincy toward Midway	Orange Line	Library One-way operation
Quincy toward Linden	Purple Line Express	Library One-way operation
Quincy toward 54th/Cermak	Pink Line	Library One-way operation
Quincy One-way operation	Brown Line	Library toward Kimball
Former services
Preceding station	Chicago North Shore and Milwaukee Railroad	Following station
Quincy/Wells One-way operation	North Shore Line	State/Van Buren toward Roosevelt Road
Preceding station	Chicago "L"	Following station
Quincy Next clockwise	Loop Elevated	Dearborn/Van Buren Closed 1949 Next counter-clockwise
Franklin/Van Buren Closed 1955 One-way operation	Metropolitan main line	Dearborn/Van Buren Closed 1949 toward Marshfield
Track layout
Location

LaSalle/Van Buren is a Chicago "L" station in downtown Chicago serving the CTA's Brown, Orange, Pink, and Purple Lines. LaSalle/Van Buren is one of the eight stations in the Loop. The station opened on October 3, 1897. LaSalle Street Station, terminal for Metra's Rock Island District trains, is less than a block from the station.

The station is seen in the 1986 film Running Scared with Gregory Hines and Billy Crystal. All of the surroundings, including the platforms and the station, are still the same now as they are in the movie. The station was also a location in one of the final scenes of the 1987 film Planes, Trains and Automobiles with Steve Martin and John Candy. The station is also seen in the 1974 film Three the Hard Way.

LaSalle/Van Buren and Quincy are the only two stations on the loop which largely retain their original appearance.

The Chicago Board of Trade Building is one block to the north.

== Bus connections ==
CTA

- 22 Clark (Owl Service)
- 24 Wentworth (weekday rush hours only)
- 36 Broadway
- 130 Museum Campus (Memorial Day–Labor Day only)
