= Congress/Wabash station =

Railway station in Chicago, Illinois, US

CONGRESS & WABASH 500S 45E
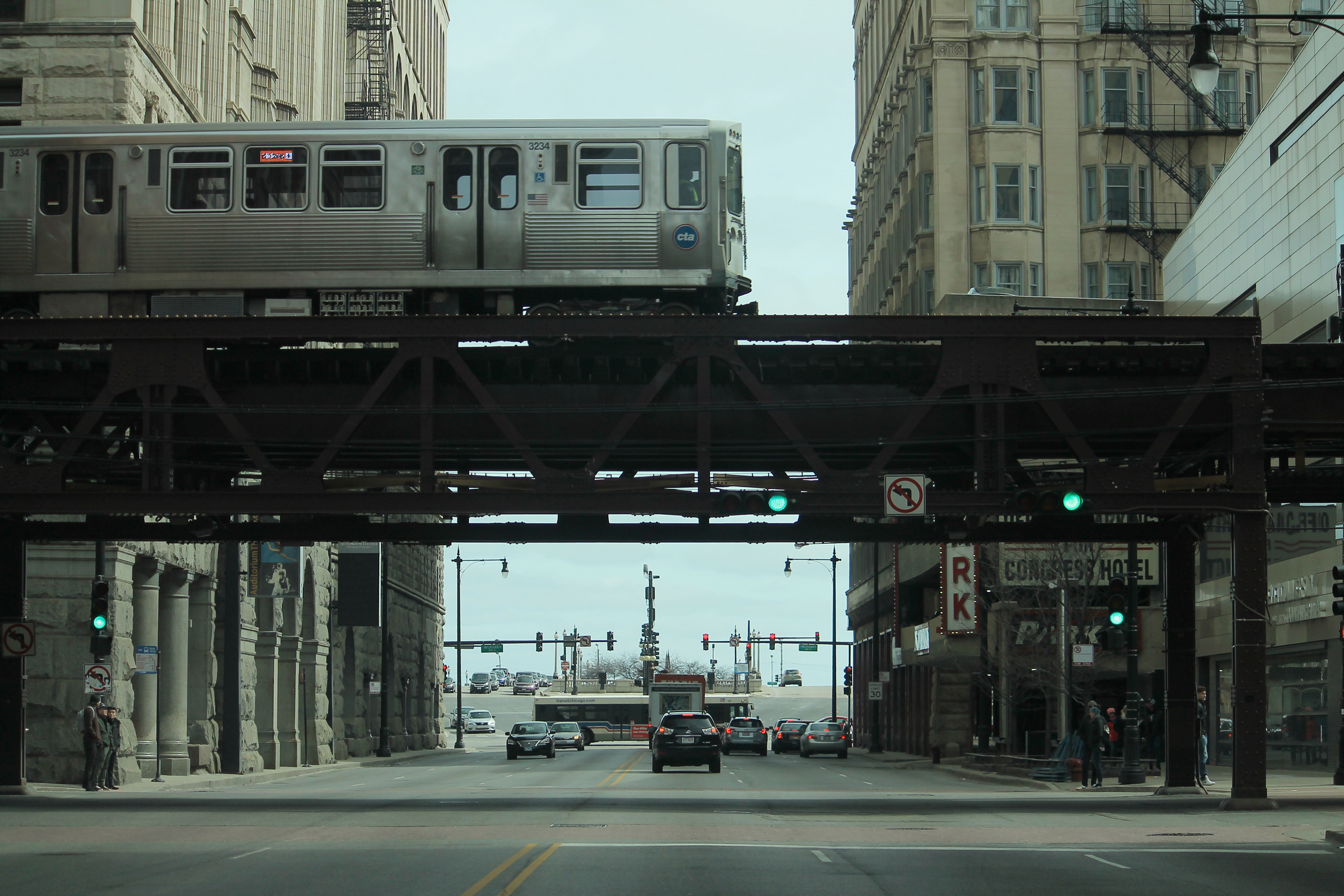
- Location of the demolished station, 2018

General information
- Location: 500 South Wabash Avenue; Chicago, Illinois 60605
- Coordinates: 41.87570°N 87.62603°W
- Owner: Chicago Transit Authority
- Line: South Side Elevated
- Platforms: 2 side platforms
- Tracks: 2 tracks

Construction
- Structure type: Elevated

History
- Opened: October 18, 1897
- Closed: August 1, 1949

Former services
Preceding station	Chicago North Shore and Milwaukee Railroad	Following station
Adams/Wabash toward Milwaukee	North Shore Line	Roosevelt Road Terminus
State/Van Buren One-way operation	North Shore Line	Roosevelt Road Terminus
Preceding station	Chicago "L"	Following station
Adams/Wabash Loop-bound terminus	South Side Elevated	Roosevelt toward 58th
State/Van Buren One-way operation	South Side Elevated	Roosevelt toward 58th
Location

Congress/Wabash was a station on the Chicago Transit Authority's South Side Main Line, which is now part of the Green Line. The station was located at Congress Avenue and Wabash Avenue in the Loop neighborhood of Chicago. Congress/Wabash was situated south of Adams/Wabash and north of Roosevelt/Wabash. Congress/Wabash opened on October 18, 1897, to replace the Congress Terminal and closed on August 1, 1949.
