= 35th–Bronzeville–IIT station =

Chicago "L" station

35-Bronzeville-IIT 3500S 16E
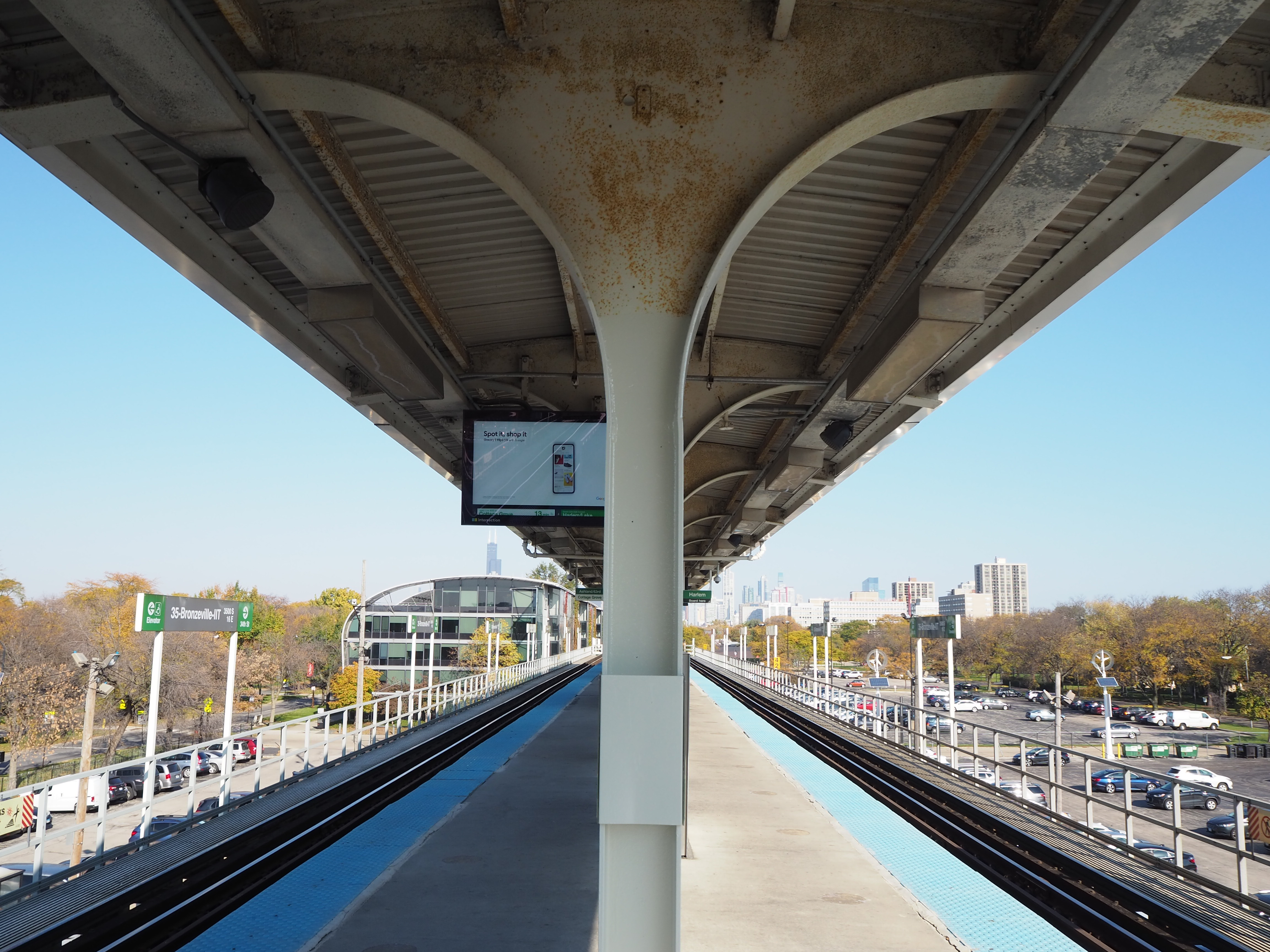
- View northwest from the station, toward IIT's State Street Village.

General information
- Location: 16 East 35th Street; Chicago, Illinois 60616
- Coordinates: 41.831677°N 87.625826°W
- Owner: Chicago Transit Authority
- Line: South Side Elevated
- Platforms: 1 Island platform
- Tracks: 2 tracks
- Connections: at 35th Street; CTA buses

Construction
- Structure type: Elevated
- Cycle facilities: Yes
- Accessible: Yes

History
- Opened: June 6, 1892; 134 years ago
- Rebuilt: 1965; 61 years ago, 1996; 30 years ago
- Former names: 35th Street; Tech-35th

Passengers
- 2025: 394,915 ▲25.5%

Services
Preceding station	Chicago "L"	Following station
Cermak–McCormick Place toward Harlem/Lake	Green Line	Indiana toward Ashland/63rd or Cottage Grove
Former services
Preceding station	Chicago "L"	Following station
Roosevelt (Note: Next station north was Cermak until it closed in 1977, service at the time was named "Jackson-Howard route") toward Howard	Howard–Englewood–Jackson Park route	Indiana toward Ashland or Jackson Park
33rd Street Closed 1961 toward Loop (Adams/Wabash) or Congress Terminal	South Side Elevated	Pershing Closed 1949 toward 58th
Track layout
Location

35th–Bronzeville–IIT (formerly Tech–35th) is an 'L' station on the CTA's Green Line, located in the Douglas community area. It is situated at 16 E 35th Street, just east of State Street.

== History ==
The station opened on June 6, 1892, along with the rest of the initial segment of the South Side Elevated Railroad. It is the oldest continuously operating station on the Chicago "L", being the only remaining station from the original opening. In October 1962, the station, then known as "Tech-35th", caught fire. The northbound platform was destroyed, and service between the adjacent Cermak and Indiana stations was suspended for four days. The station operated using temporary platforms until its renovation in 1965.

Currently, the station serves the historic neighborhood of Bronzeville as well as the Illinois Institute of Technology campus, which is located immediately across State Street from the station. The station also serves Rate Field, though the Red Line station of Sox–35th is closer. In April 2011, a new Metra station opened between the two CTA stations, providing a convenient transfer point for those traveling to and from the suburbs.

Walt Disney worked here as a guard and gate man as a teenager in 1918.

== Layout ==
The station features a farecard-only entrance at 3400S, on what would normally be 34th Street.

North of this station, the Green Line tracks pass directly over the McCormick Tribune Campus Center. In order to reduce the impact of noise from passing trains on the facility, the tracks are enclosed in a 530-foot (160 m) tube made from concrete and stainless steel.

== Gallery ==
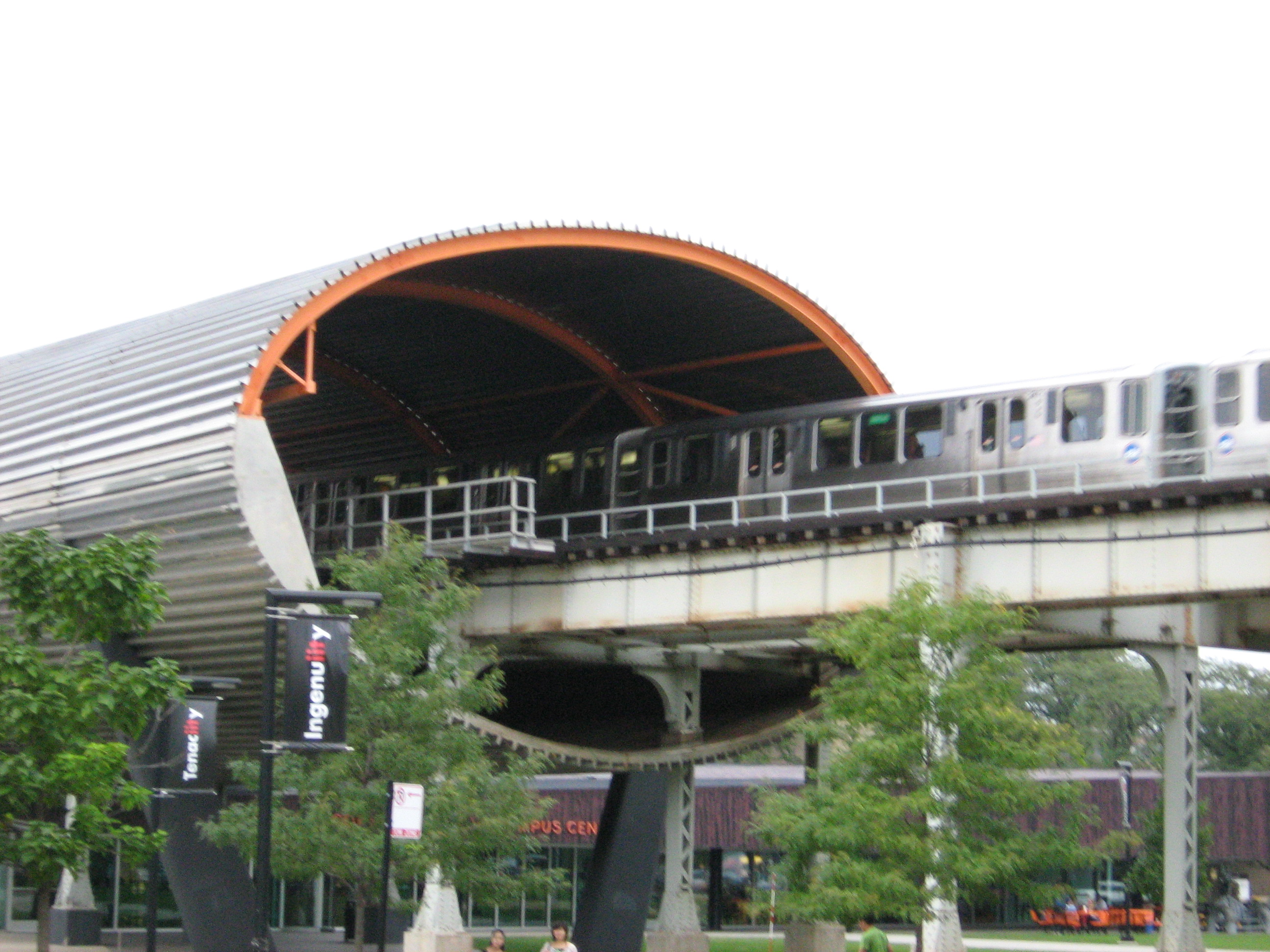
Tunnel just before the station at 33rd Street, over the MTCC of IIT's Main Campus, September 2007.

== Bus and rail connections ==
CTA

- 29 State
- 31 31st (weekdays only)
- 35 31st/35th

Metra

- Rock Island (at 35th Street)
