= Pershing station =

PERSHING 3900S 1E
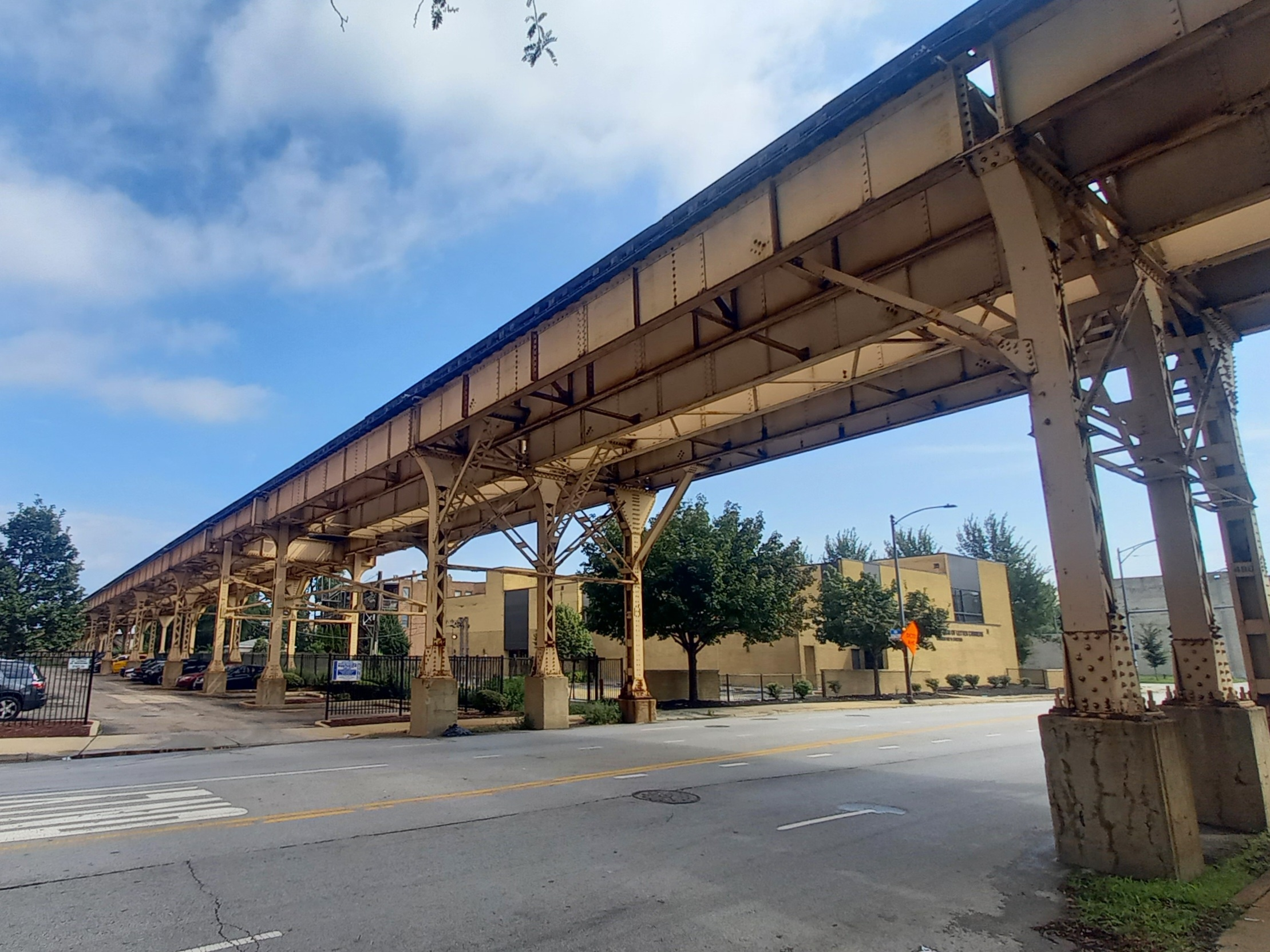
- Location of the demolished station, 2025

General information
- Location: Pershing Road and State Street; Chicago, Illinois
- Coordinates: 41.82372°N 87.62568°W
- Owner: Chicago Transit Authority
- Line: South Side Elevated
- Platforms: 2 side platforms
- Tracks: 2 tracks

Construction
- Structure type: Elevated

History
- Opened: June 6, 1892
- Closed: August 1, 1949
- Rebuilt: 1907
- Former names: 39th Street

Former services
Preceding station	Chicago "L"	Following station
35th toward Loop (Adams/Wabash) or Congress Terminal	South Side Elevated	Indiana toward 58th
Location

Pershing was a station on the Chicago Transit Authority's South Side Elevated Line, which is now part of the Green Line. The station was located at Pershing Road and State Street in the Douglas neighborhood of Chicago. Pershing was situated south of Tech–35th, which is now named 35th–Bronzeville–IIT, and north of Indiana. Pershing opened on June 6, 1892, and closed on August 1, 1949.
