= Cermak–McCormick Place station =

Chicago "L" station

Cermak– McCormick Place 2200S 0E
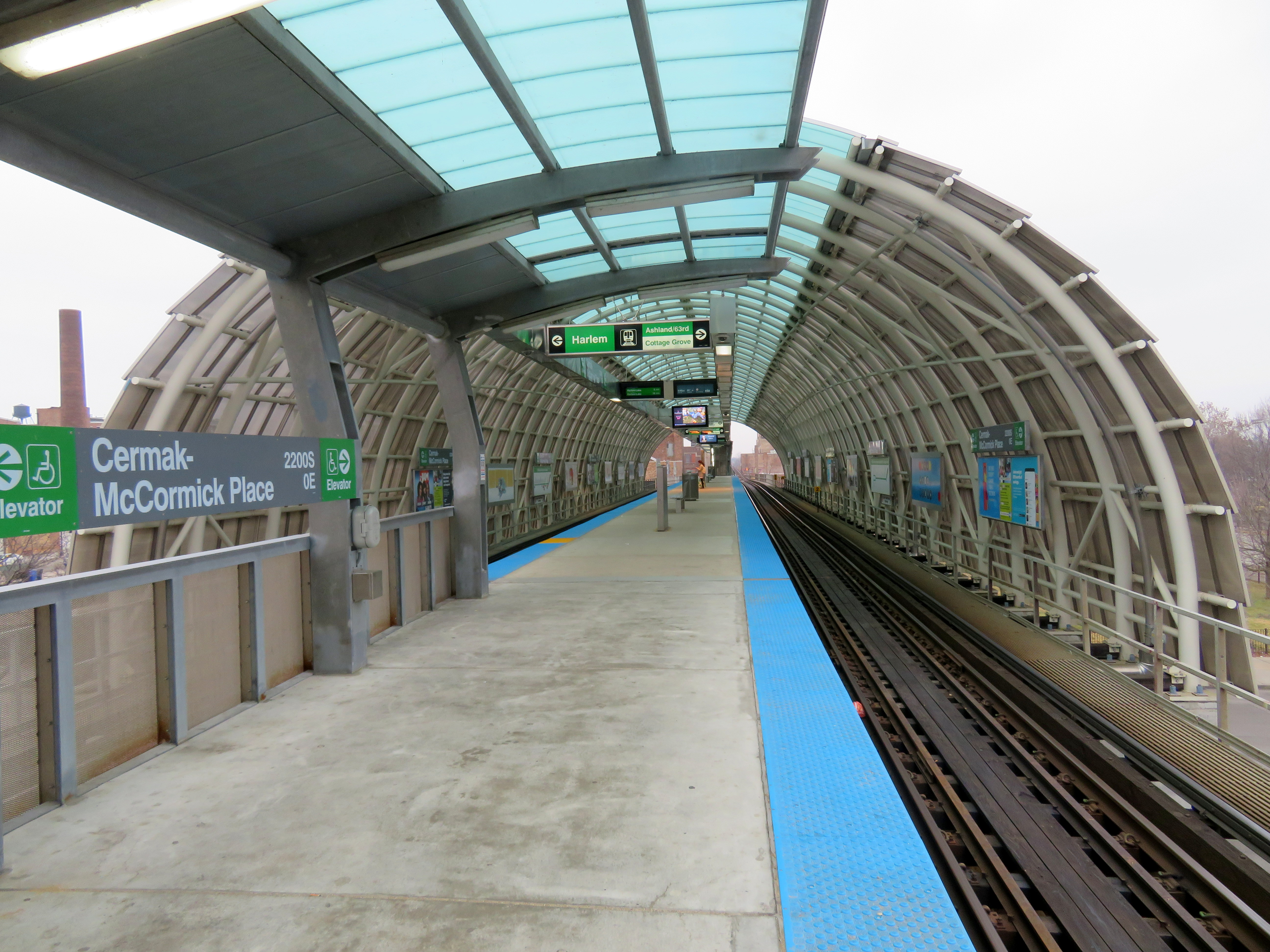

General information
- Location: 12 E. Cermak Rd. Chicago, Illinois 60616
- Coordinates: 41.8531548°N 87.626423°W
- Owner: Chicago Transit Authority
- Line: South Side Elevated
- Platforms: 2 side platforms (original station); 1 island platform (rebuilt station)
- Tracks: 2 tracks

Construction
- Structure type: Elevated
- Accessible: Yes

History
- Opened: June 6, 1892; 134 years ago – February 8, 2015; 11 years ago
- Closed: September 9, 1977; 48 years ago
- Rebuilt: 1907; 119 years ago, 2013–2015; 11 years ago
- Former names: 22nd Street (1892–1933); Cermak (1933–1977)

Passengers
- 2025: 552,896 ▲26%

Services
Preceding station	Chicago "L"	Following station
Roosevelt toward Harlem/Lake	Green Line	35th–Bronzeville–IIT toward Ashland/63rd or Cottage Grove
Former services
Preceding station	Chicago "L"	Following station
18th Street Closed 1949 toward Loop (Adams/Wabash) or Congress Terminal	South Side Elevated	26th Street Closed 1949 toward 58th
Track layout
Location

Cermak–McCormick Place is an "L" station on the CTA's Green Line. The station, designed by Chicago-based Ross Barney Architects and engineered by Primary Consultant T.Y. Lin International, is located at Cermak Road and State Street on the Near South Side of Chicago. The station includes three entrances – one on each side of Cermak Road and one at 23rd Street. The main station entrance is built on the north side of Cermak road.

The new station replaced the original Cermak station that opened on June 6, 1892, closed on September 9, 1977, and was demolished in 1978. The new, fully accessible infill station was engineered and constructed into and around the existing, historic elevated rapid transit structure while maintaining full transit service. The station's signature element is the structural steel tube that serves as a windbreak for passenger boarding areas. Both the former and the new station are situated south of Roosevelt and north of 35th–Bronzeville–IIT.

On January 17, 2012, Chicago mayor Rahm Emanuel announced at a press conference that the Cermak station would be rebuilt in order to serve McCormick Place. The $50 million investment was also intended to boost the development of residential neighborhoods in the City's Near South Side and revitalize the adjacent historic Motor Row District. A groundbreaking ceremony for the new station was held on August 29, 2013. The new Cermak-McCormick Place Green Line station opened on February 8, 2015.

== Bus Connections ==
CTA

- 21 Cermak
- 29 State
