= Roosevelt station (CTA) =

Chicago "L" station

Roosevelt 1200S 1E/1W Roosevelt 50E 1200S
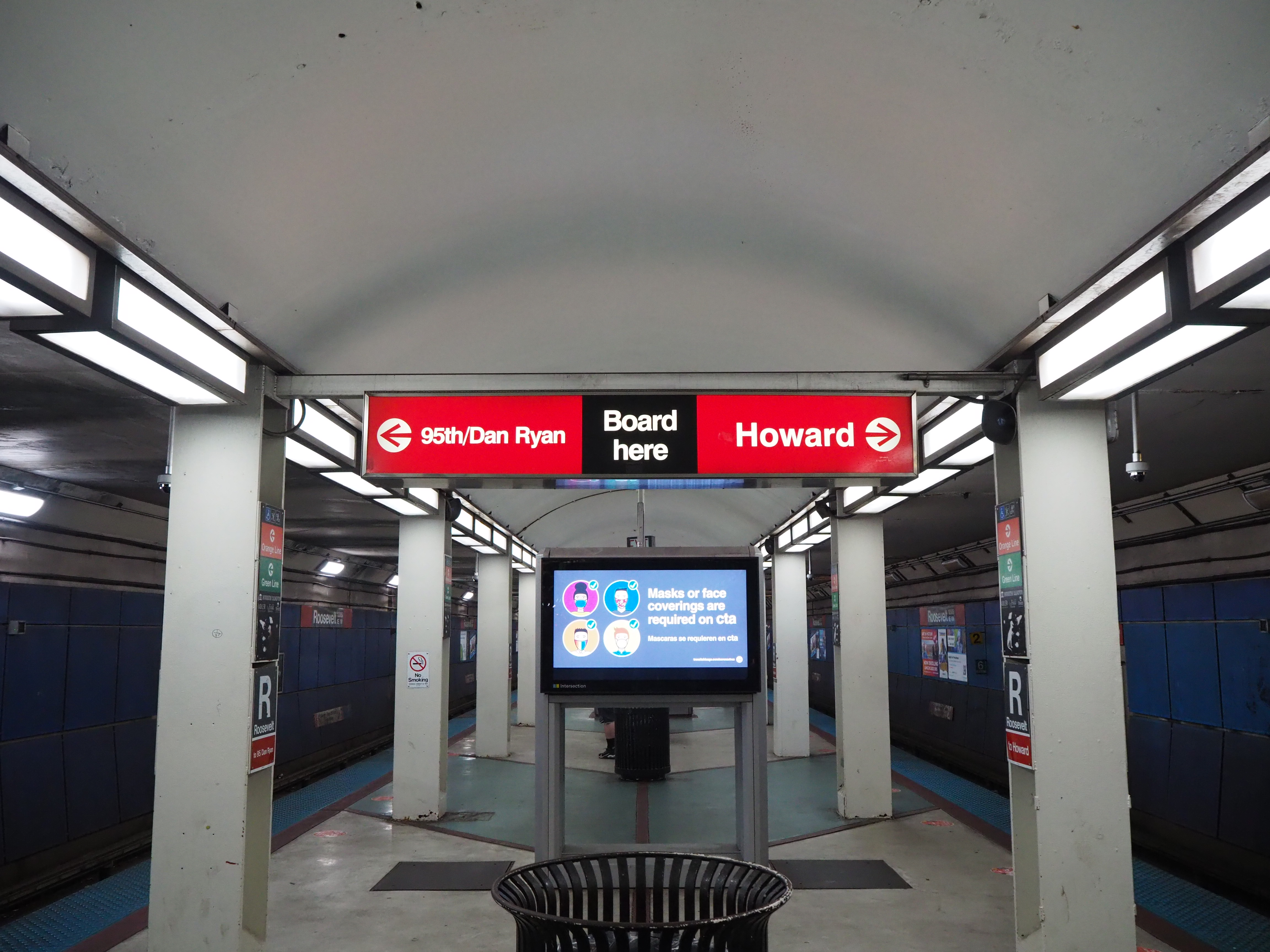
- Red Line subway platform

General information
- Location: 1167 South State Street; Chicago, Illinois 60605
- Coordinates: 41°52′03″N 87°37′36″W
- Owner: City of Chicago
- Lines: State Street subway South Side Elevated
- Platforms: 2 island platforms (1 subway, 1 elevated)
- Tracks: 4 (2 Subway, 2 Elevated)

Construction
- Structure type: Elevated (Orange and Green Lines); Subway (Red Line)
- Depth: 33 feet (10 m)
- Parking: No
- Cycle facilities: Yes
- Accessible: Yes

History
- Opened: June 6, 1892; 134 years ago (elevated), October 17, 1943; 83 years ago (subway)
- Rebuilt: Elevated: 1993; Subway: 1996

Key dates
- "L" service ceased: August 1, 1949; 77 years ago (elevated)
- CNS&M service ceased; closed: January 21, 1963; 63 years ago (elevated)
- "L" service restored: November 1, 1993; 32 years ago (elevated)

Passengers
- 2025: 2,437,456 ▲2.1%

Services
Preceding station	Chicago "L"	Following station
Harrison toward Howard	Red Line	Cermak–Chinatown toward 95th/Dan Ryan
Halsted toward Midway	Orange Line	Library toward Loop (Library)
Halsted toward Midway	Orange Line	Adams/Wabash One-way operation
Adams/Wabash toward Harlem/Lake	Green Line	Cermak–McCormick Place toward Ashland/63rd or Cottage Grove
Former services
Preceding station	Chicago North Shore and Milwaukee Railroad	Following station
Congress/Wabash Closed 1949 toward Milwaukee	North Shore Line	Terminus
Congress Terminal Closed 1963 Terminus	North Shore Line	Terminus
Preceding station	Chicago "L"	Following station
Harrison toward Howard	Howard–Englewood–Jackson Park route	Tech–35th (Note: Next station south was Cermak until it closed in 1977, service at the time was named "Jackson Park service") toward Ashland or Jackson Park
Congress/Wabash Closed 1949 toward Loop (Adams/Wabash)	South Side Elevated	18th Street Closed 1949 toward 58th
Congress Terminal Closed 1949 Terminus	South Side Elevated	18th Street Closed 1949 toward 58th
Track layout
Location

Roosevelt is an "L" station on the CTA's Red, Green, and Orange Lines, located between the Chicago Loop and the Near South Side in Chicago, Illinois. It is situated at 1167 S State Street, just north of Roosevelt Road. The station is also the closest "L" station to the Museum Campus of Chicago and Soldier Field, which are about 1/2 mile (800 m) to the east. The Museum Campus/11th Street Metra station is also about 1/3 mile (500 m) to the east. A transfer tunnel connects the subway station (Roosevelt/State), served by Red Line trains, and the elevated station (Roosevelt/Wabash), served by Green and Orange Line trains.

== History and description ==
=== Elevated station ===
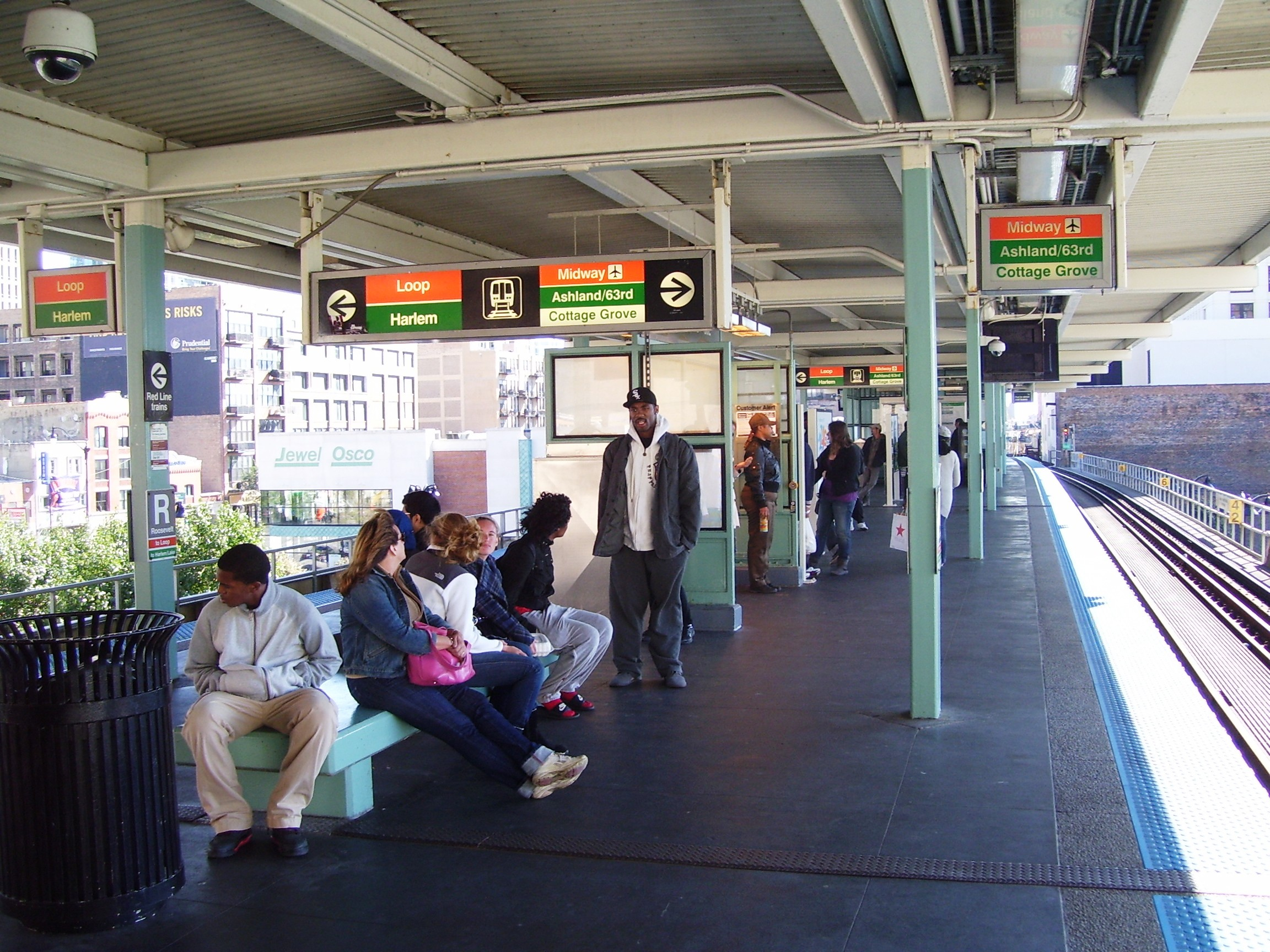
Green/Orange Line elevated platform

An elevated station at Roosevelt opened on June 6, 1892, as part of the Chicago and South Side Rapid Transit Railroad, the first elevated rapid transit line in Chicago. From 1919 to 1963, interurban trains of the North Shore Line also used the station. "L" service through the station was discontinued in 1949 when CTA routed all trains from the Englewood and Jackson Park branches through the State Street subway, using the 13th Street portal, forming the North-South Route (a precursor of today's Red Line), and following the bankruptcy of the North Shore Line in 1963 the station was closed completely and demolished. "L" service resumed passing the site of the original station in 1969 when the CTA began to route Lake–Dan Ryan trains into the Loop.

A new elevated station was constructed in 1993 as part of the new Orange Line service. The station's design is typical to other Orange Line stations with a wide, flat canopy over the entire platform and an spacious headhouse on the north side of Roosevelt Road.

Immediately south of the station exists a pocket track, which is used to turn trains back to the Loop if any activity, such as construction, is obstructing rail traffic.

=== Subway station ===
The subway station at Roosevelt opened on October 17, 1943, as part of the State Street subway. In 1996, Roosevelt was renovated with new lighting and new tilework with Art Deco-inspired motifs and silhouettes of the skyline. It was the first station to be renovated in this style.

=== Transfer tunnel ===
In 1993, when the new elevated station was constructed it was intended that there should be a direct link to the subway, however, due to lack of funds this was not initially built. The project broke ground in November 2001, after receiving $7.5 million from state and federal sources. In December 2002, the stations were finally linked as a single facility through the Roosevelt transfer tunnel.

The 200-foot-long (61 m) tunnel was designed by local architect Cynthia Muller. A mosaic, Hopes and Dreams by Juan Angel Chávez and Corinne D. Peterson, adorns the walls, consisting of over 4,000 clay tiles made by visitors to the Museum Campus in 1999 and is themed around the institutions there.

== Operations as a terminus ==
The subway station and elevated station have been used as termini, albeit both on very rare occasions. The elevated station has a reversing track located immediately south of the platform, used only when there is an obstruction between Roosevelt and 35th-Bronzeville-IIT and/or Halsted. The subway station last functioned as a terminus during Ravenswood Connector construction, when Brown Line trains were rerouted via the State Street subway to Roosevelt. If there is a service obstruction on the Red Line between Cermak-Chinatown and Roosevelt, trains are rerouted via the 13th Street Ramp to the South Side Elevated, therefore negating the need for the station to be a terminus.

== Bus connections ==
CTA

- 12 Roosevelt
- 18 16th/18th
- 29 State
- 62 Archer (Owl Service)
- 130 Museum Campus (Memorial Day through Labor Day only)
- 146 Inner Lake Shore/Michigan Express
- 192 University of Chicago Hospitals Express (weekday rush hours only)

== Gallery ==
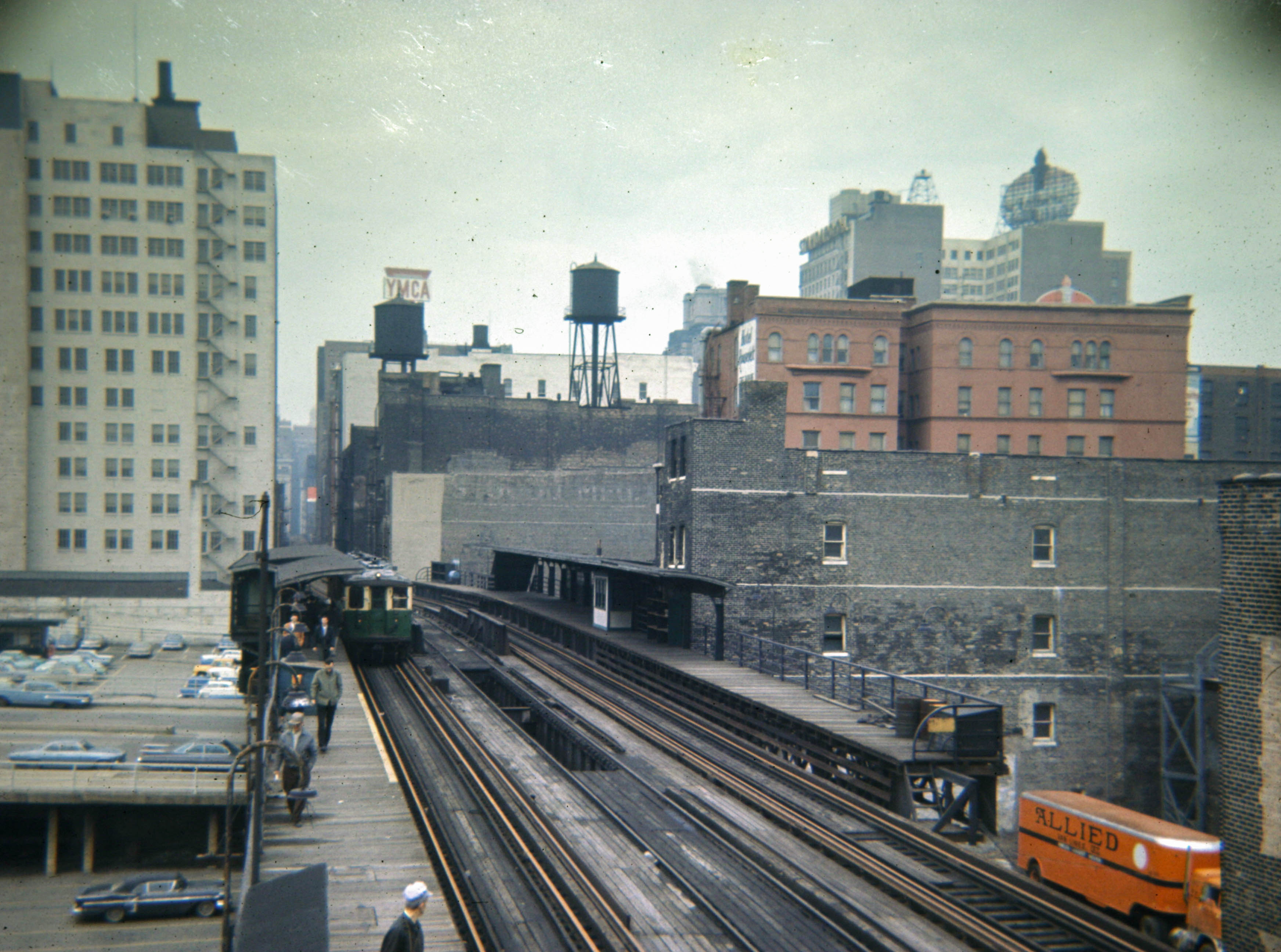
Original South Side Elevated station in 1966

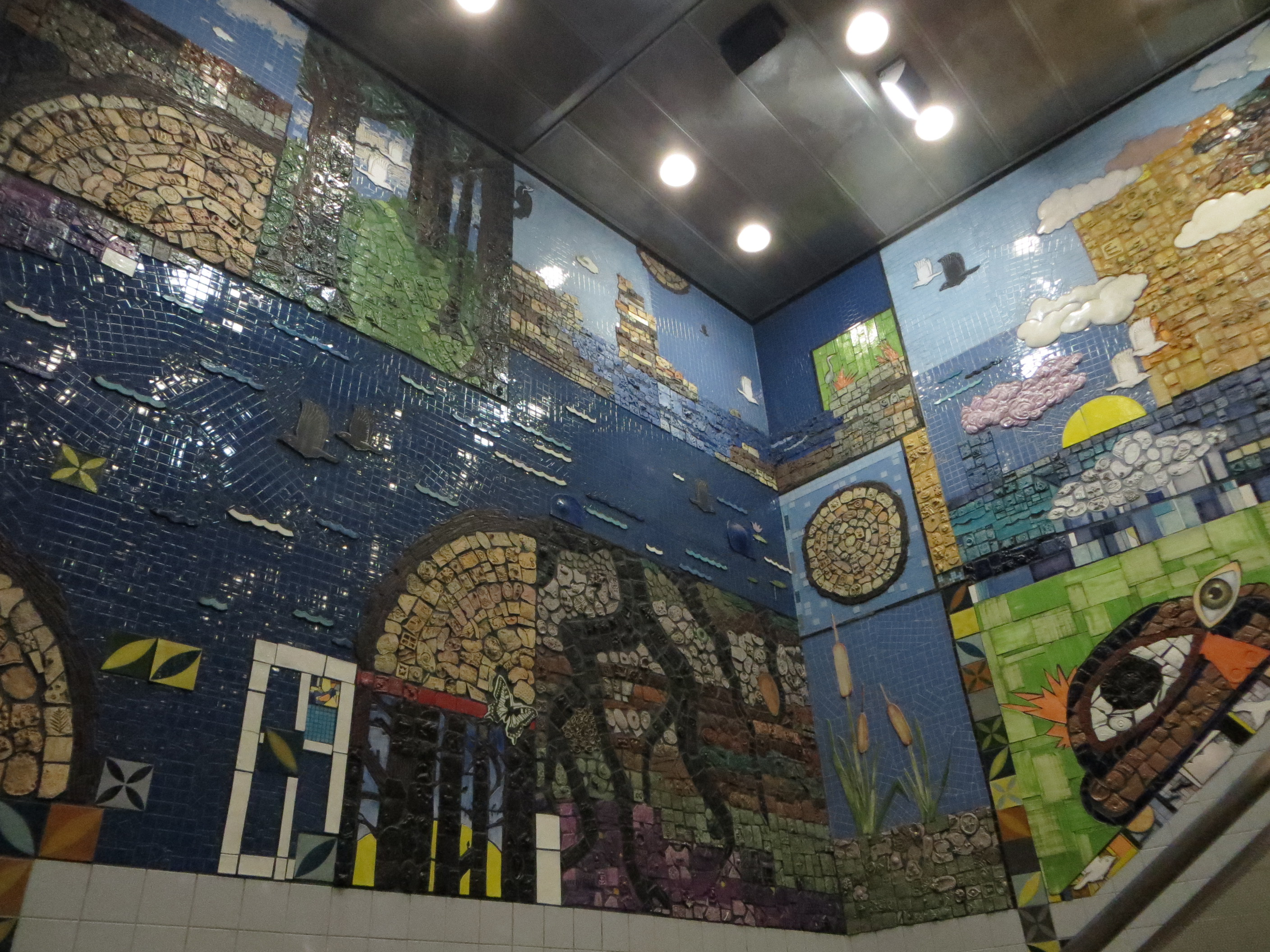
Hopes and Dreams mosaic in the transfer tunnel

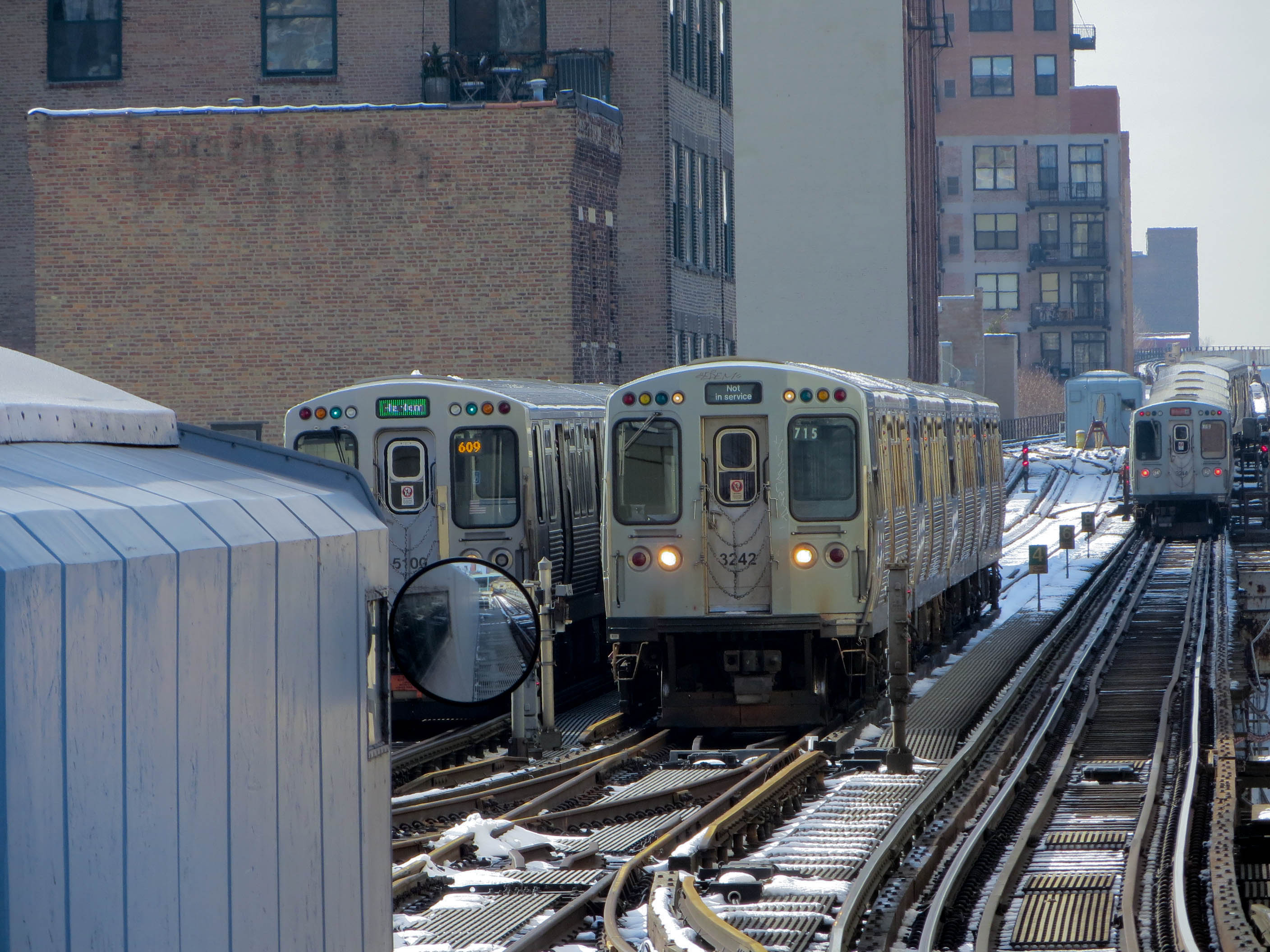
An out of service train utilizing the middle pocket track south of the elevated station

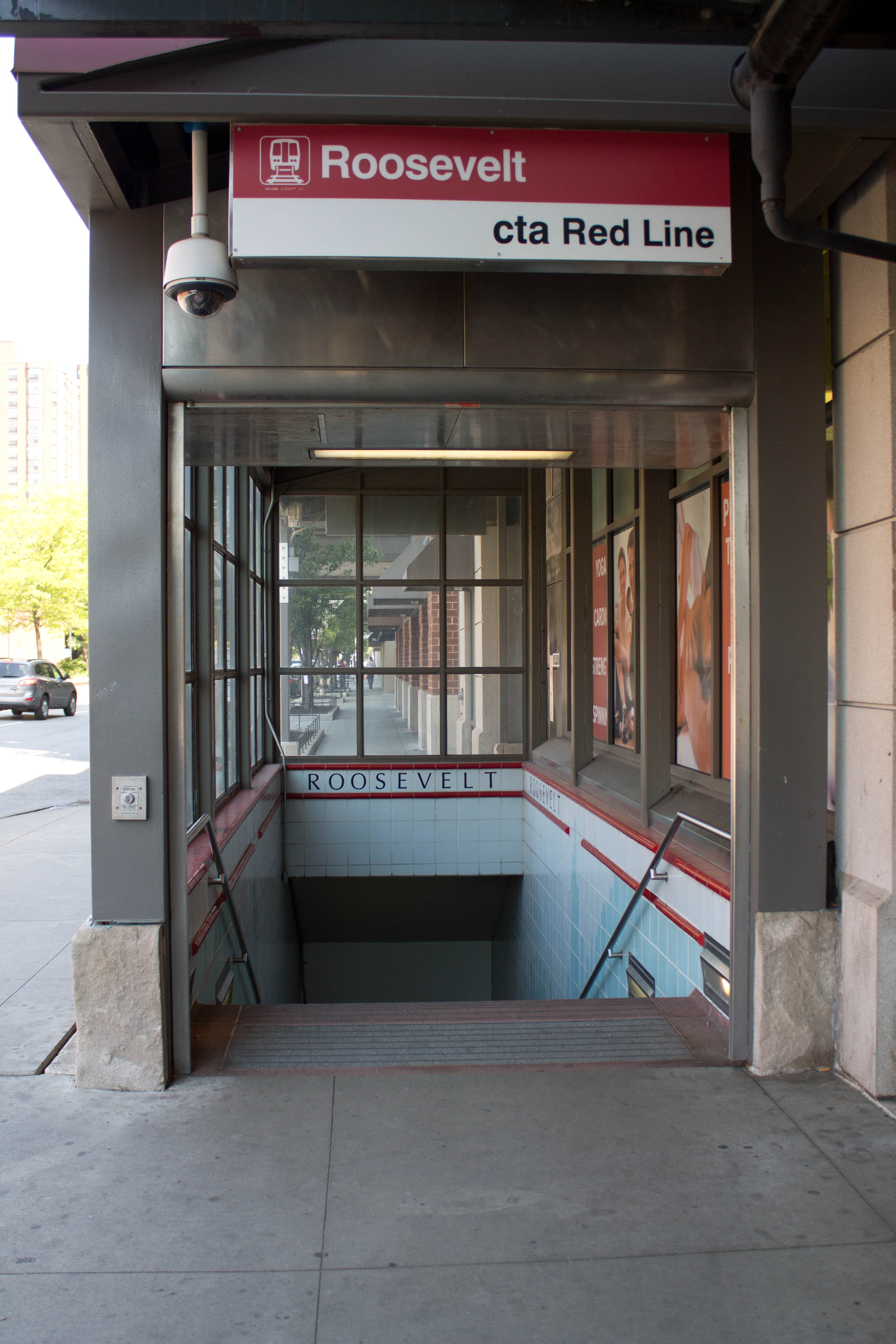
Entrance to the subway station on State Street

== See also ==
- Clark/Lake, Chicago's only other combined elevated–subway ‘L’ facility
