= Harold Washington Library–State/Van Buren station =

Chicago "L" station

Harold Washington Library State/Van Buren 1W 400S
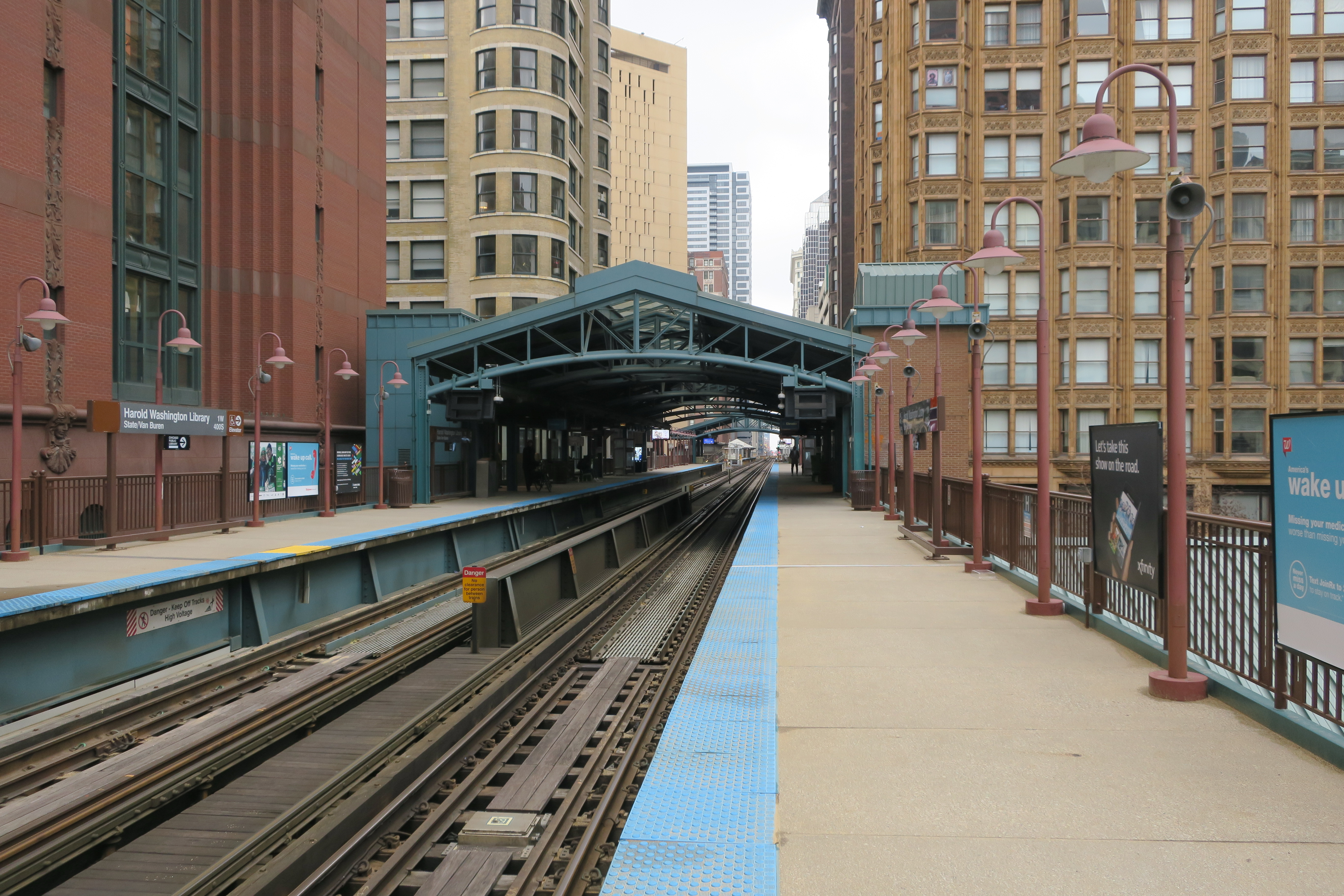
- Inner Loop platform

General information
- Location: 1 West Van Buren Street; Chicago, Illinois 60605
- Coordinates: 41.876862°N 87.628196°W
- Owner: Chicago Transit Authority
- Line: Loop Elevated
- Platforms: 2 side platforms
- Tracks: 2
- Connections: Red at Jackson/State; Blue at Jackson/Dearborn

Construction
- Structure type: Elevated
- Cycle facilities: Yes
- Accessible: Yes

History
- Opened: October 3, 1897; 129 years ago
- Closed: September 2, 1973; 53 years ago – June 22, 1997; 29 years ago
- Former names: State/Van Buren; Library–State/Van Buren

Passengers
- 2025: 784,433 ▲0.7% (CTA)

Services
Preceding station	Chicago "L"	Following station
LaSalle/Van Buren toward Midway	Orange Line	Roosevelt One-way operation
LaSalle/Van Buren toward Linden	Purple Line Express	Adams/Wabash One-way operation
LaSalle/Van Buren toward 54th/Cermak	Pink Line	Adams/Wabash One-way operation
LaSalle/Van Buren One-way operation	Brown Line	Adams/Wabash toward Kimball
Former services
Preceding station	Chicago North Shore and Milwaukee Railroad	Following station
LaSalle/Van Buren One-way operation	North Shore Line	Congress/Wabash toward Roosevelt Road
Preceding station	Chicago "L"	Following station
Dearborn/Van Buren Closed 1949 Next clockwise	Loop Elevated	Adams/Wabash Next counter-clockwise
Track layout
Location

Harold Washington Library–State/Van Buren, (formerly Library–State/Van Buren and State/Van Buren), is an 'L' station serving the CTA's Brown, Orange, Pink, and Purple Lines. Originally, the station was to have direct access to the second floor of the Harold Washington Library building, but this direct connection was never built. Farecard transfers are also available at the station for the Red and Blue Lines via the Jackson/State and Jackson/Dearborn subway stations, respectively. It was originally known as State/Van Buren when it first opened in 1897. The original station closed on September 2, 1973, along with six other stations, due to low ridership, and demolished in 1975. The new station was rebuilt and reopened on June 22, 1997 in order to serve the Harold Washington Library. The Chicago Transit Authority board voted unanimously on October 6, 2010, to give the station its current name.

== Bus connections ==
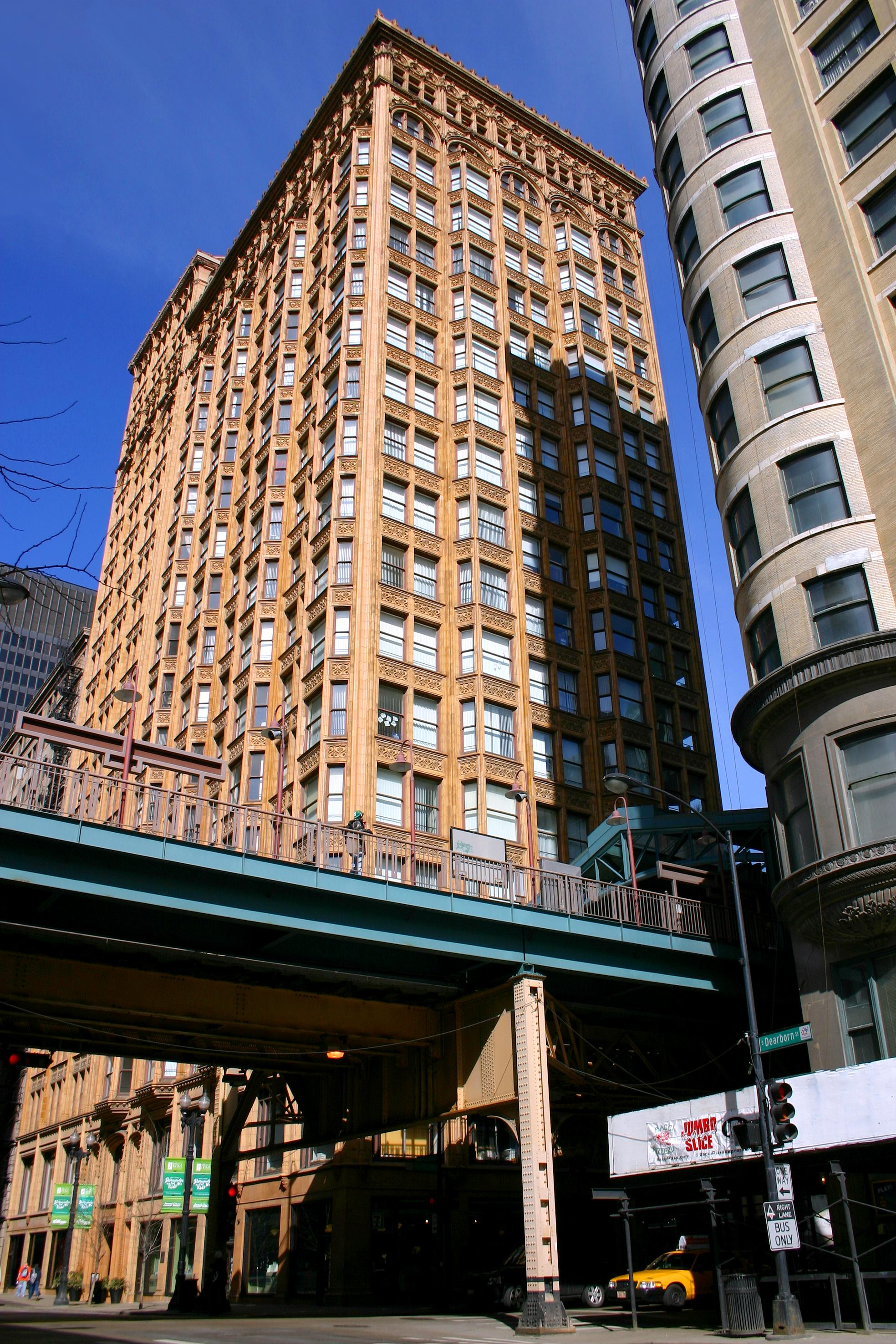
View of Library-State/Van Buren from Dearborn Street

CTA

- 2 Hyde Park Express (weekday rush hours only)
- 6 Jackson Park Express
- 10 Obama Presidential Center/Museum of Science and Industry Express
- 22 Clark (Owl Service)
- 24 Wentworth (weekdays only)
- 29 State
- 36 Broadway
- 62 Archer (Owl Service)
- 146 Inner Lake Shore/Michigan Express
- 147 Outer DuSable Lake Shore Express
