= Dearborn/Van Buren station =

DEARBORN & VAN BUREN 36W 400S
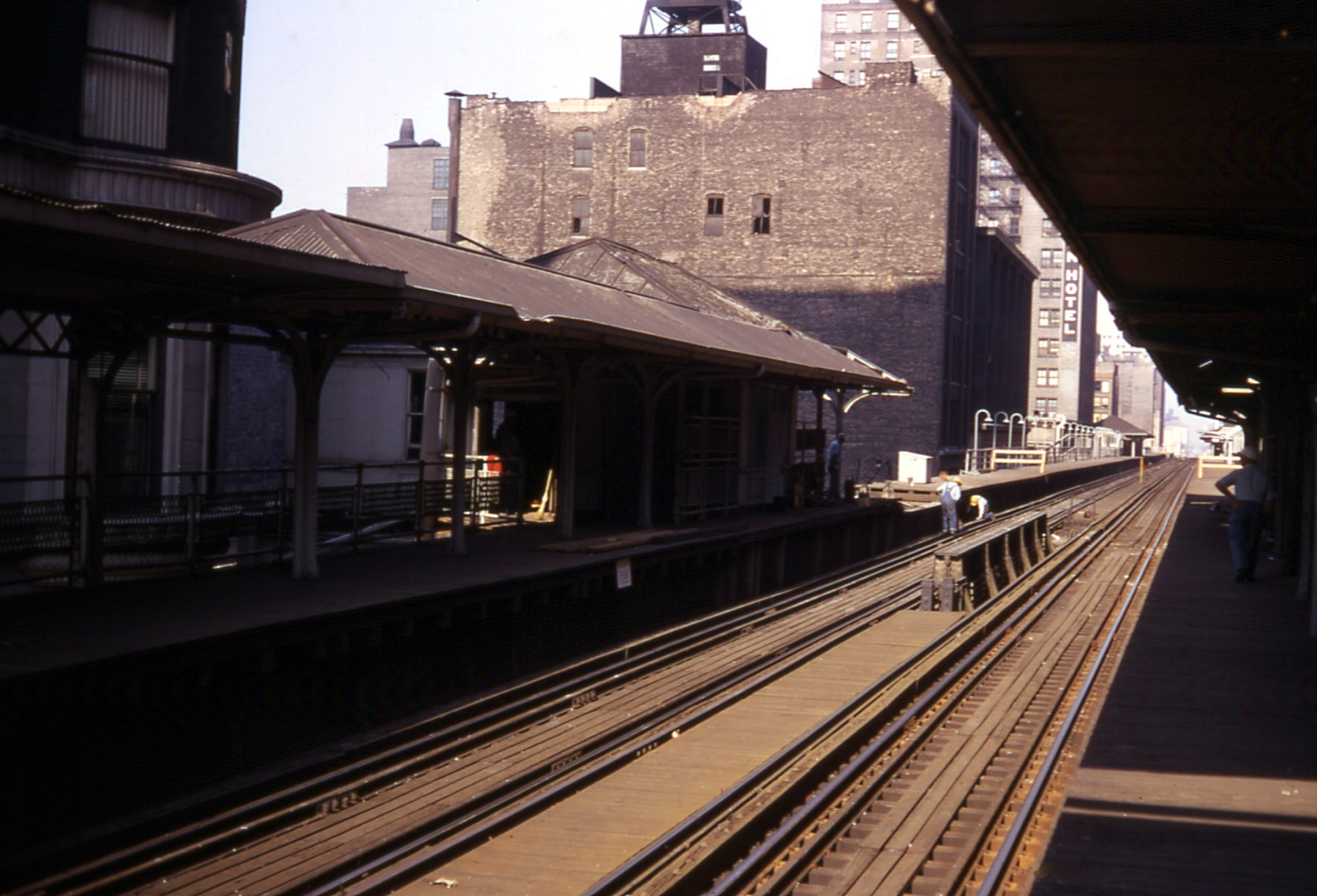
- The closed Dearborn/Van Buren station in 1968

General information
- Location: Dearborn Street and Van Buren Street; Chicago, Illinois
- Coordinates: 41.87687°N 87.62928°W
- Owner: Chicago Transit Authority
- Line: The Loop
- Platforms: 2 side platforms
- Tracks: 2 tracks

Construction
- Structure type: Elevated

History
- Opened: October 3, 1897
- Closed: 1949

Former services
Preceding station	Chicago "L"	Following station
LaSalle/Van Buren Next clockwise	Loop Elevated	State/Van Buren Next counter-clockwise
Location

Dearborn/Van Buren was a station on the Chicago Transit Authority's Loop. The station was located at Dearborn Street and Van Buren Street in downtown Chicago. Dearborn/Van Buren opened on October 3, 1897, and closed in 1949. The closed station was severely damaged by an explosion in 1968, and the station houses were removed in 1971, the rest of the station was demolished in 1975.

The Harold Washington Library-State/Van Buren station now occupies the former Dearborn/Van Buren station area.

== Image Gallery ==
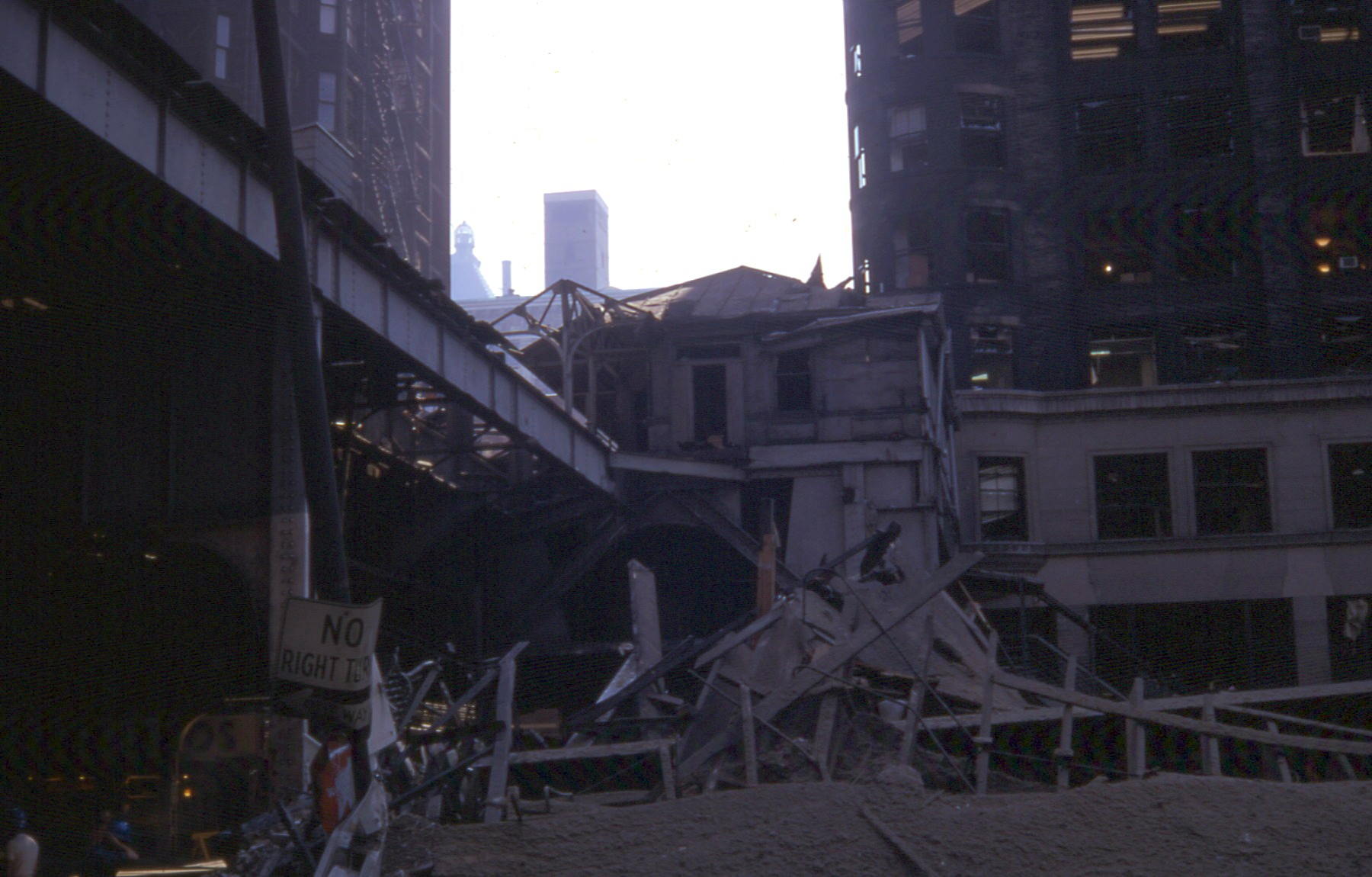

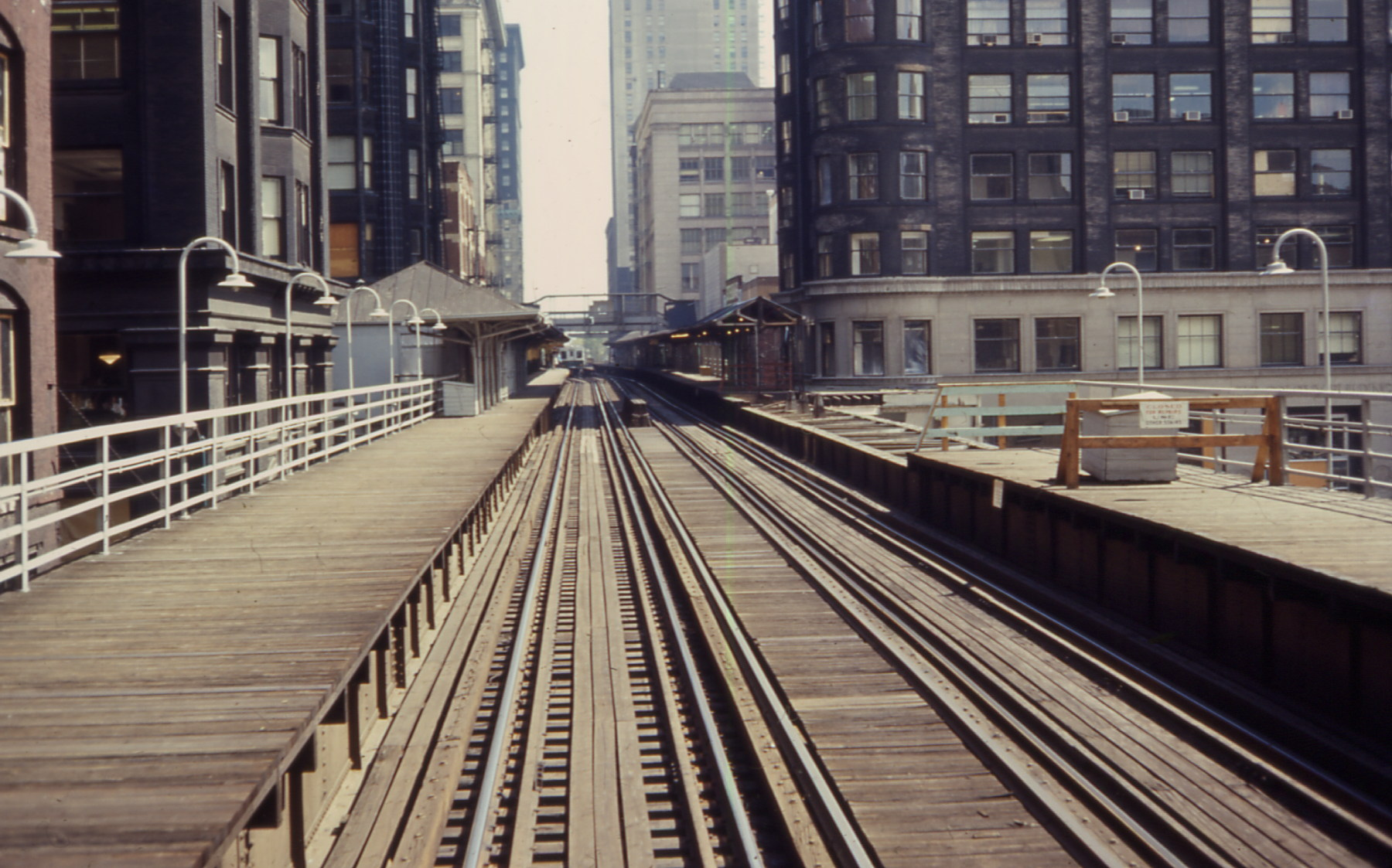
