= South Side Elevated =

Segment of the Chicago "L"

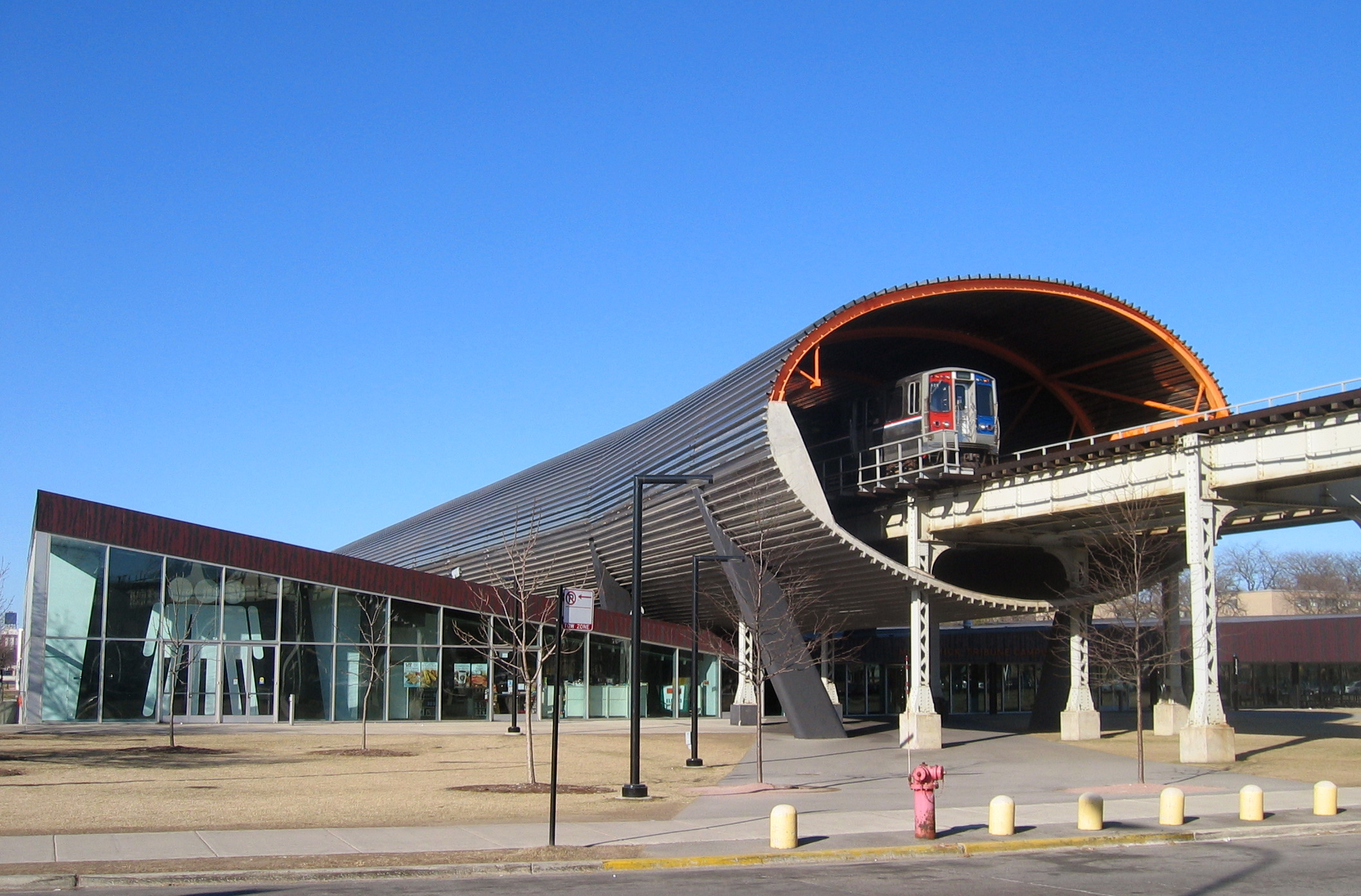
- The Green Line passes over the McCormick Tribune Campus Center

Overview
- Status: Operational
- Locale: Chicago, Illinois, United States
- Termini: Roosevelt; Garfield
- Stations: 8

Service
- Type: Rapid transit
- System: Chicago "L"
- Services: Green Orange
- Operator(s): Chicago Transit Authority (1947–present); Chicago Rapid Transit Company (1924–1947); South Side Elevated Railroad (1892–1924)
- Rolling stock: 5000-series
- Daily ridership: 8,119 (average weekday 2019)

History
- Opened: June 6, 1892; 134 years ago

Technical
- Line length: 6.5 mi (10.5 km)
- Character: Elevated
- Track gauge: 4 ft 8 1/2 in (1,435 mm) standard gauge
- Electrification: Third rail, 600 V DC

The South Side Elevated is a branch of the Chicago "L" system in Chicago, Illinois that is served by the Green Line for its entire length, and the Orange Line north of 17th Street. It has on average 12,509 passengers, counting branch divisions, boarding each weekday as of February 2013, according to the Chicago Transit Authority. The branch is 6.5 miles (10.5 km) long with a total of 8 stations, and runs from the Near South Side to the Washington Park neighborhood of Chicago.

== Route ==
The South Side Elevated serves the Near South Side, Douglas, Bronzeville, Grand Boulevard, and Washington Park neighborhoods of Chicago and has stops near the Illinois Institute of Technology and the University of Chicago. South of 17th Street, the Orange Line splits off to continue on its route to Midway Airport.

The South Side Elevated continues to the Englewood branch (Ashland/63rd) and the Jackson Park branch (Cottage Grove).

== History ==
The South Side Elevated started passenger service on June 6, 1892, with service as far south as 39th Street (Pershing Road), making the branch the oldest section of the Chicago "L". On January 22, 1893, service on the line was extended as far south as 61st Street. The Jackson Park branch was added later in 1893 to serve the site of the 1893 World's Fair. Several other branches were opened over time to serve parts of the city, though most have since been demolished. The Englewood branch was opened in 1905, followed by the Kenwood and Normal Park branches in 1907, and the Stock Yards branch in 1908. Today, only the Englewood (now Ashland) and Jackson Park (now East 63rd) branches remain.

In 1993, the Green Line was created when the CTA color-coded the lines. Also in 1993, the Roosevelt/Wabash station was rebuilt and reopened to serve as a transfer station for the newly opened Orange Line. In 1994, the 58th station closed while remaining stations were renovated or rebuilt entirely depending on their condition. Roosevelt remained open to service the Orange Line. The line reopened in 1996. In 2012, the platform of the 58th station was completely demolished. In 2015, a new Cermak–McCormick Place station opened in the same location as the original Cermak station, to serve the McCormick Place convention center.

== Station listing ==
Station	Location	Notes
Congress Terminal	550 S. Holden Court	Closed October 18, 1897, reopened March 10, 1902. Closed August 1, 1949; demolished.
Congress/Wabash	500 S. Wabash Avenue	Closed August 1, 1949; demolished
Roosevelt	22 E. Roosevelt Road	Originally called 12th Street
18th Street	18th Street and Wabash Avenue	Closed August 1, 1949; demolished
Cermak–McCormick Place	12 E. Cermak Road	Originally called 22nd Street
26th Street	26th Street and Wabash Avenue	Closed August 1, 1949; demolished
29th Street	29th Street and Wabash Avenue	Closed August 1, 1949; demolished
31st Street	31st Street near State Street	Closed August 1, 1949; demolished
33rd Street	33rd Street and Wabash Avenue	Closed September 25, 1961; demolished
35th–Bronzeville–IIT	16 E. 35th Street	Originally called 35th Street, later Tech-35th
Pershing	Pershing Road and State Street	Original southern terminal, Closed August 1, 1949; demolished
Indiana	4003 S. Indiana Avenue	Former terminal for Stock Yards and Kenwood Lines
43rd	314 E. 43rd Street	
47th	314 E. 47th Street	Terminal of Prairie extension.
51st	319 E. 51st Street	Terminal of Washington Park extension.
Garfield	320 E. Garfield Boulevard	Originally called 55th Street
58th	320-24 E. 58th Street	Closed January 9, 1994; demolished

== Image gallery ==
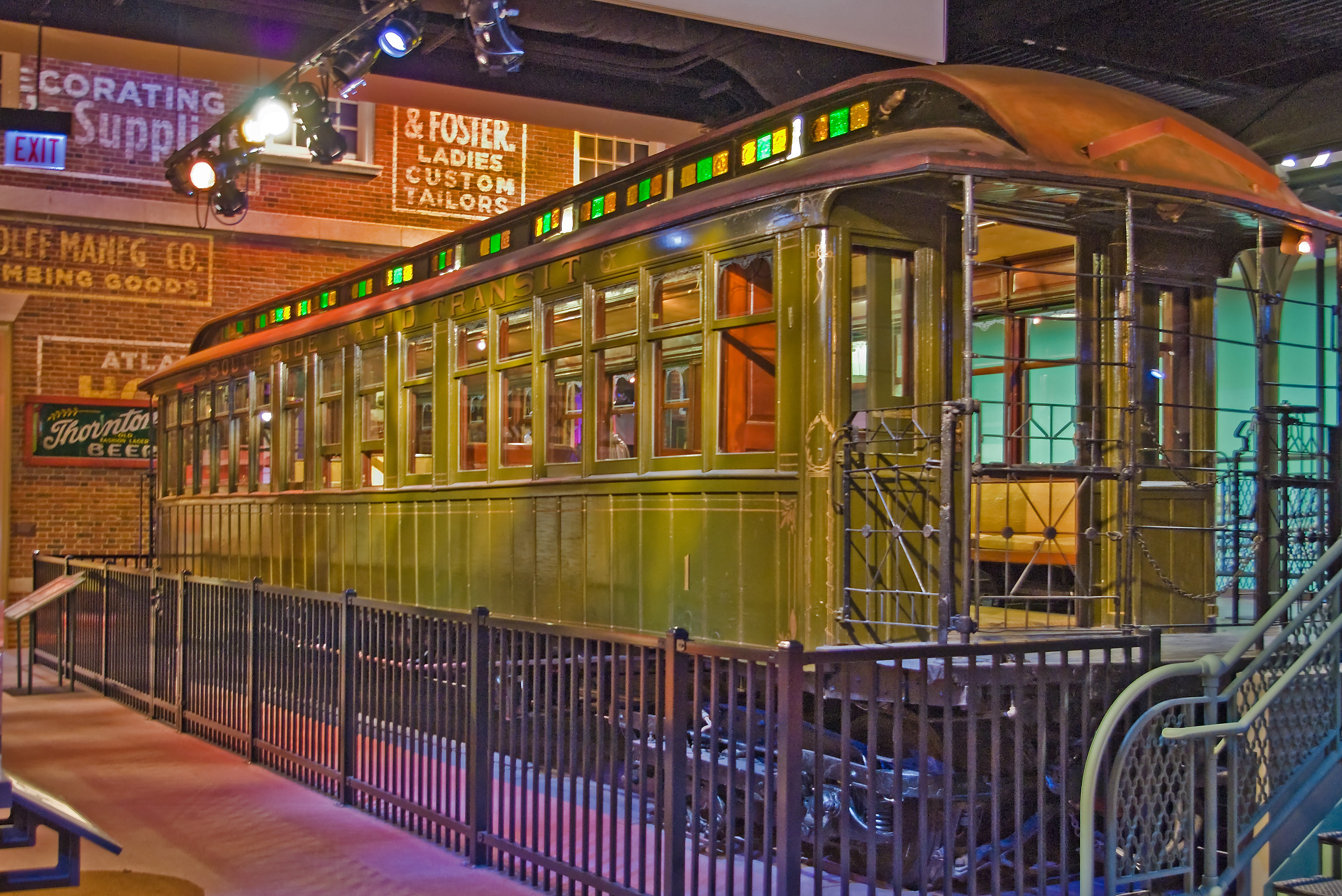
Railcar #1 is one of the oldest trains from the South Side Elevated Railroad

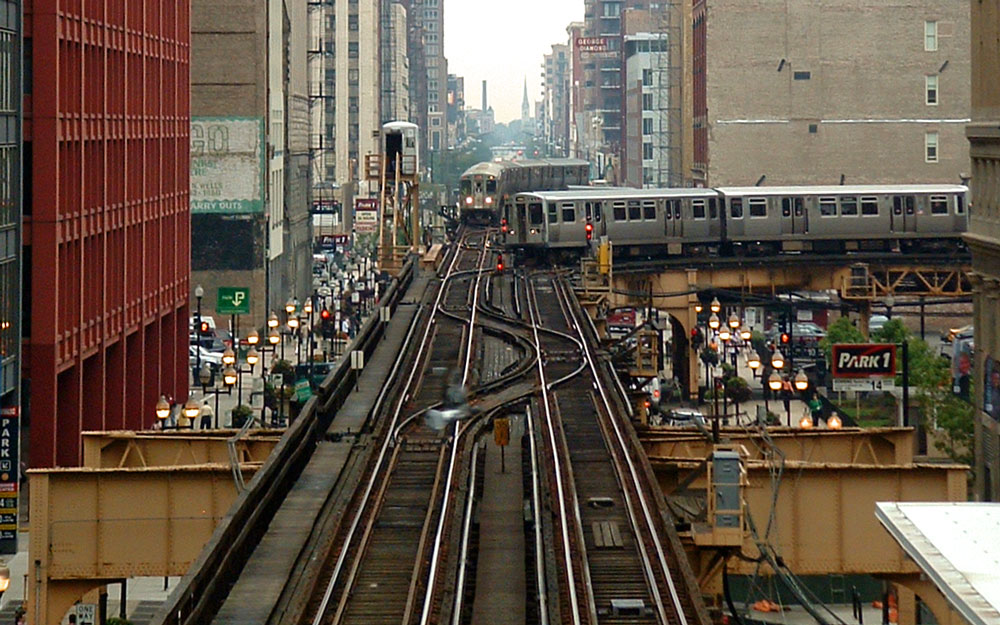
An Orange Line train (behind the turning train) at the northern end of the South Side Elevated branch

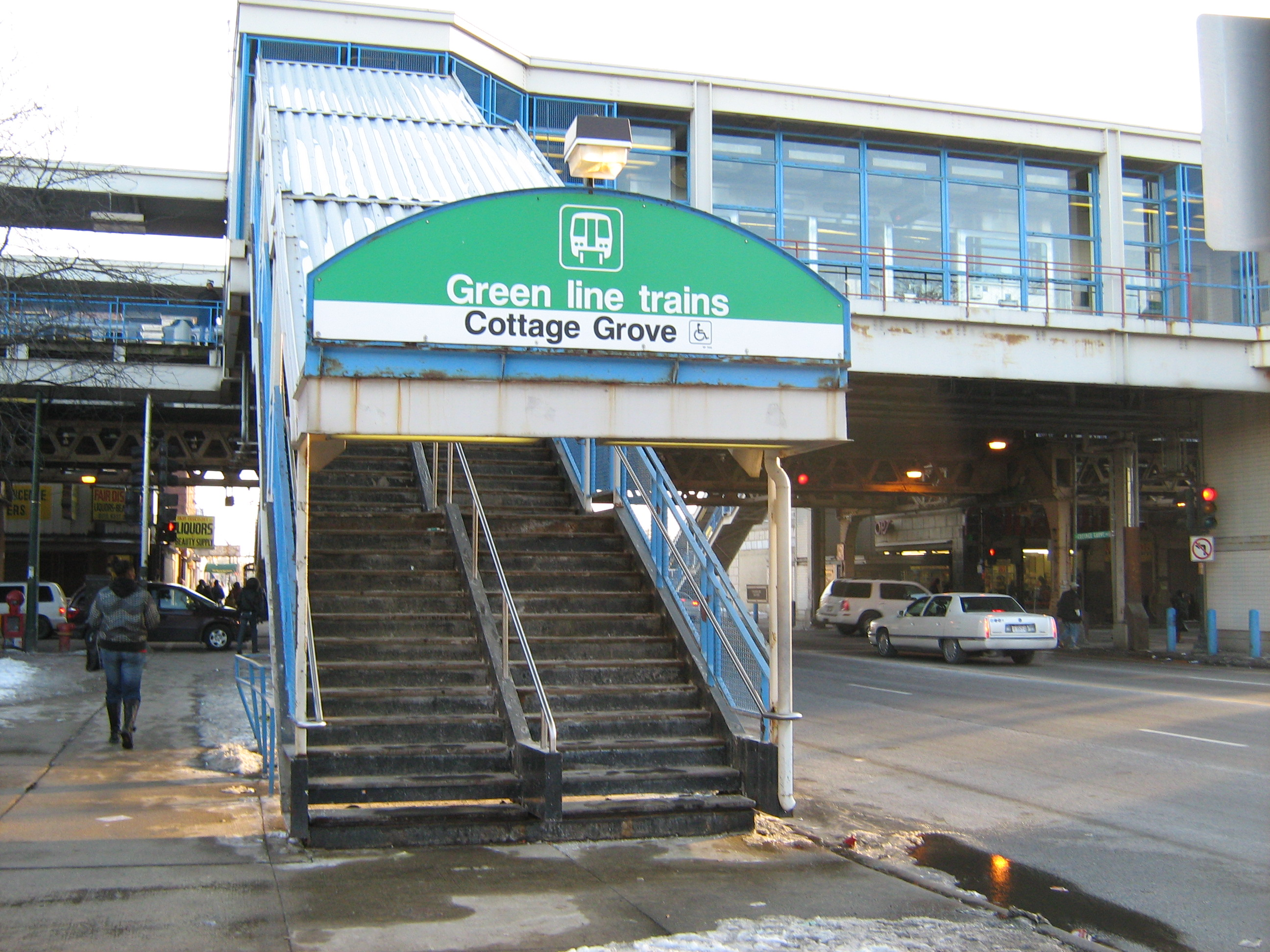
The Cottage Grove station is the terminus of the Jackson Park branch

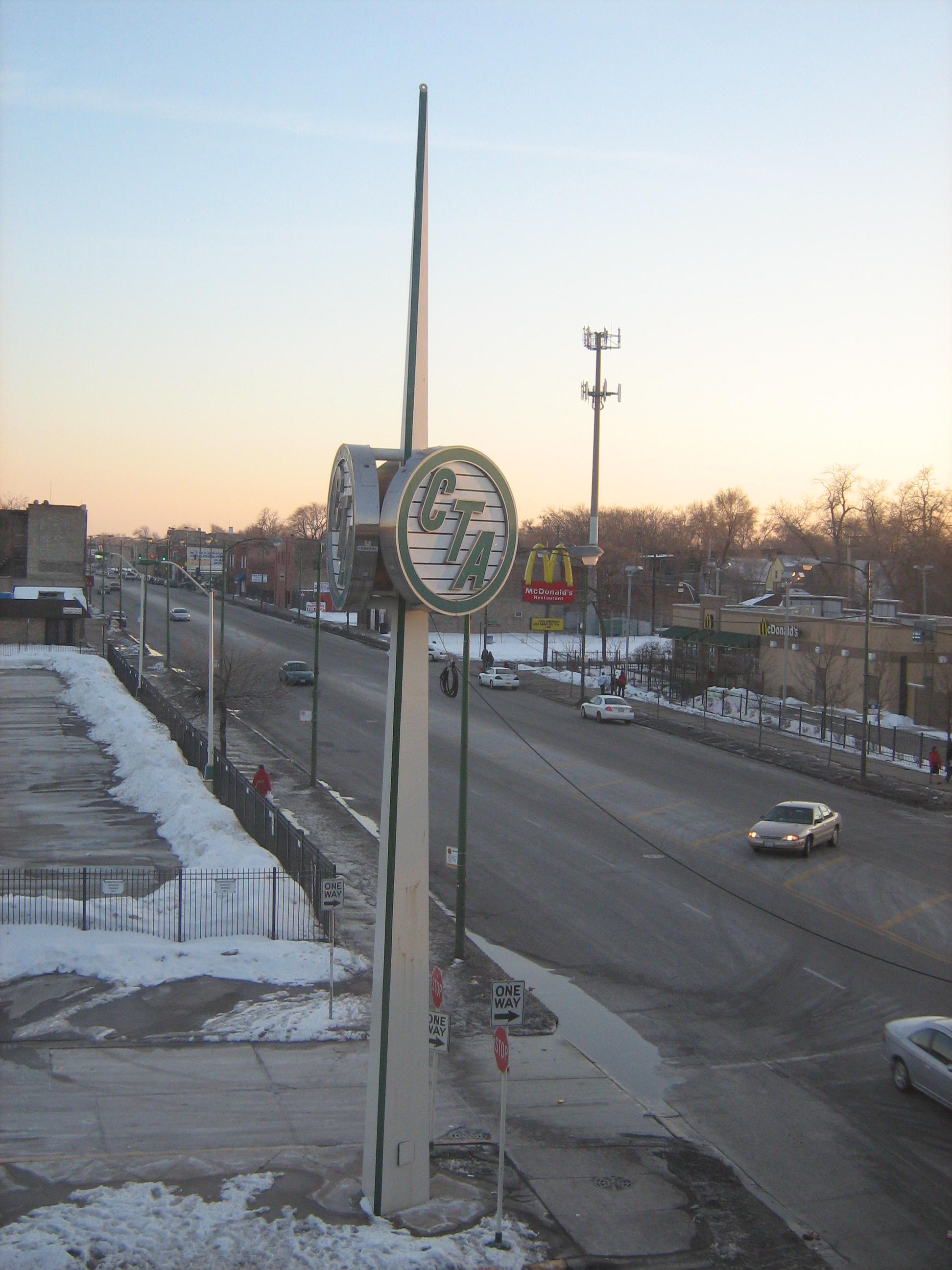
A CTA monument overlooking the Ashland/63rd terminal
