= Congress Terminal =

Former rapid transit station

CONGRESS TERMINAL 500S 25E
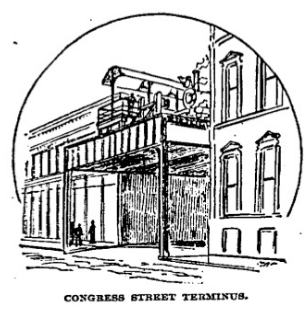
- The Congress Street Terminal in 1892

General information
- Location: Congress Parkway and Holden Court; Chicago, Illinois
- Coordinates: 41.8757°N 87.6268°W
- Owner: Chicago Transit Authority
- Line: South Side Elevated
- Platforms: 1 Side platform
- Tracks: 1 track

Construction
- Structure type: Elevated

History
- Opened: June 6, 1892
- Closed: August 1, 1949 (CTA); January 21, 1963 (CNS&M)

Former services
| Preceding station | Chicago North Shore and Milwaukee Railroad | Following station |
|---|---|---|
| Terminus | North Shore Line | Roosevelt Road Terminus |
| Preceding station | Chicago "L" | Following station |
| Terminus | South Side Elevated | Roosevelt toward 58th |
Track layout
Location

Congress Terminal was a rapid transit station on the Chicago "L", serving its South Side Elevated. It was located at Congress Parkway over Holden Court. The terminal opened in 1892 as the original northern terminus of the Elevated; when the Loop was constructed in 1897, the terminal closed and was replaced by the Elevated's Congress/Wabash station about 200 feet (61 m) away. The Loop's congestion issues led to the terminal's reopening in 1902, renamed Old Congress to distinguish it from the Congress/Wabash station.

Congress Terminal was built by the Chicago and South Side Rapid Transit Railroad and was one of Chicago's original 'L' stations. On August 1, 1949, the CTA stopped service to the terminal as part of the service revision introducing A-B Skip-Stop service to the south side. The Chicago North Shore and Milwaukee Railroad continued to use the station as a baggage terminal until the line quit in 1963.

== Nomenclature ==
The name of the station was fluid over time. It was referred to as the "Congress street station" and "Congress street terminus" in 1892, and the "State–Congress terminal" upon its closing in 1949.

== History ==
=== Opening and original use (1892–1897) ===
The South Side Elevated Railroad was incorporated in 1888, and commenced operations on June 6, 1892. Its northern terminus was a station on Congress Street that was a one-track and one-platform affair. The congestion at the terminal was such that the Chicago Tribune remarked that:

Something should be done by the managers of the South Side Rapid Transit company to relieve the congestion at the Congress street station. As matters now stand not only is no provision made for the hauling of a crowd of passengers of any dimensions whatever, but the arrangement of the passengers leading to the platform of the station is such as to preclude the possibility of accommodating a rush. The first stairway leading from the street is broad enough, but after the second story of the building is reached quite a difficulty is encountered. Passengers fall into line and then force themselves into a narrow passage leading to the ticket-window, after which they take a tack to the right and ascend the stairs leading to the platform where the train is to be taken.

In case of a crush at this narrow passageway – and there is always a crush where forty or fifty people come into the station at once in a hurry to take a train – the movement is so slow that a jam inevitably results, the consequence being that many persons must necessarily miss a train they could have otherwise taken. It is admitted by the elevated railroad people that the arrangement is a bad one, but promise that everything will be remedied before the World's Fair crowds come upon them. This, however, is hardly enough. A change just now would be welcome and result in increased passenger traffic. Many people yesterday, not caring to brave the crush at the ticket-seller's window, became disgusted and went away to take the cable cars, which, however crowded, admit the possibility of being boarded.

=== Loop and disuse (1897–1902) ===
The Loop opened, resulting in the closure of the Terminal.

=== Reuse and final days (1902–1963) ===
The Loop became overcrowded, so the old Congress terminal was reopened in 1902. To prevent confusion with the nearby Congress/Wabash station, it was renamed "Old Congress".

== Station details ==
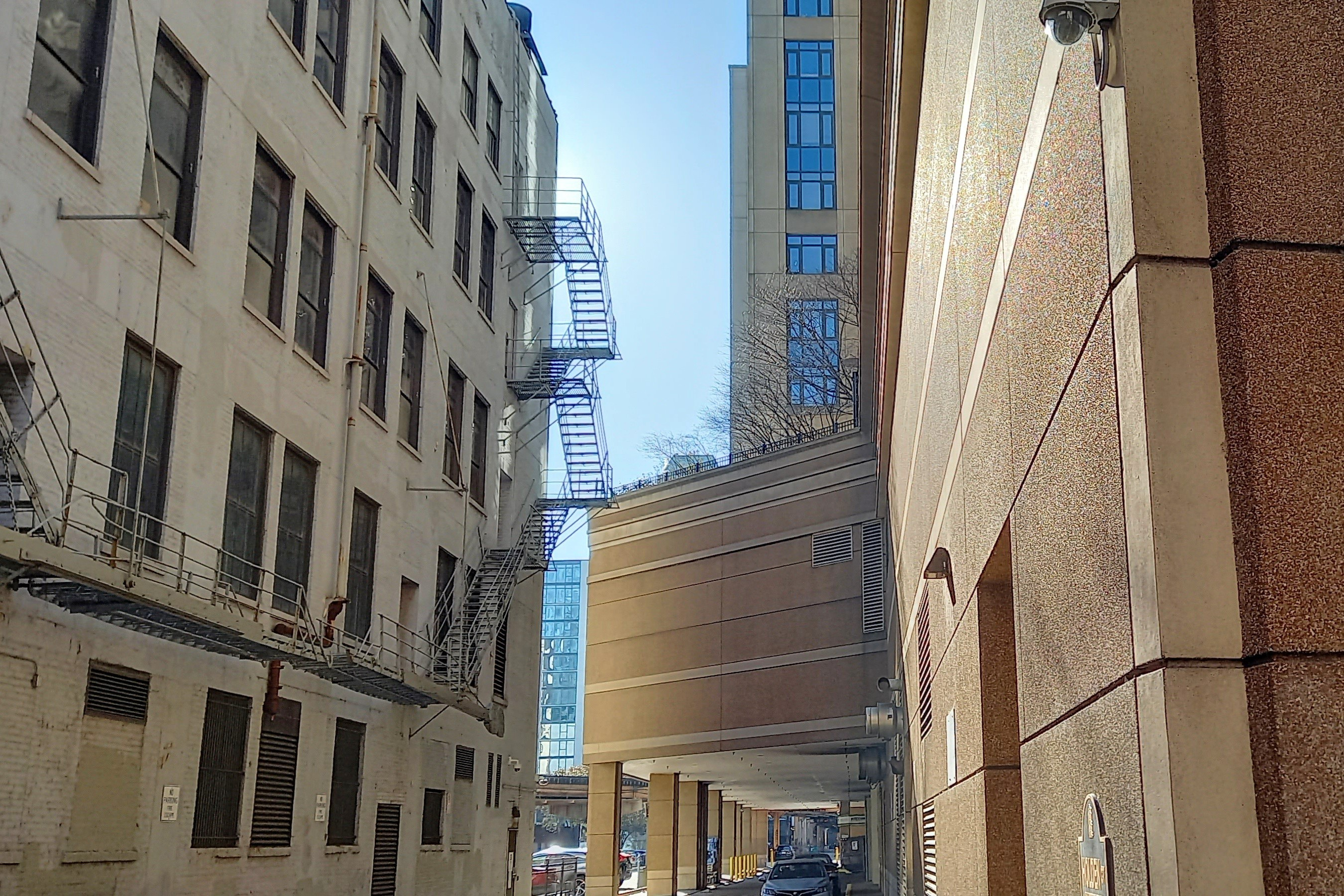
Location of the demolished terminal

Throughout its existence, the terminal was a single-track operation with a platform on its eastern end.

=== Operations and connections ===
As originally opened, the South Side Elevated took 14 minutes to go between Congress and 39th streets, half the time the State Street cable car route took. Service was 24 hours, with trains run every 20 minutes between midnight and 5 a.m.; every 14 minutes between 5 a.m. and 7 a.m. and between 10 p.m. and midnight; every 6 minutes between 7 a.m. and 8:30 a.m., 9:30 a.m. to 4 p.m., and 6:30 p.m. to 10 p.m.; and every 3 minutes between 8:30 and 9:30 a.m. and 4 to 6:30 p.m. during rush hours.
