= 58th station =

Former rapid transit station in Chicago

58th 5800S 300E
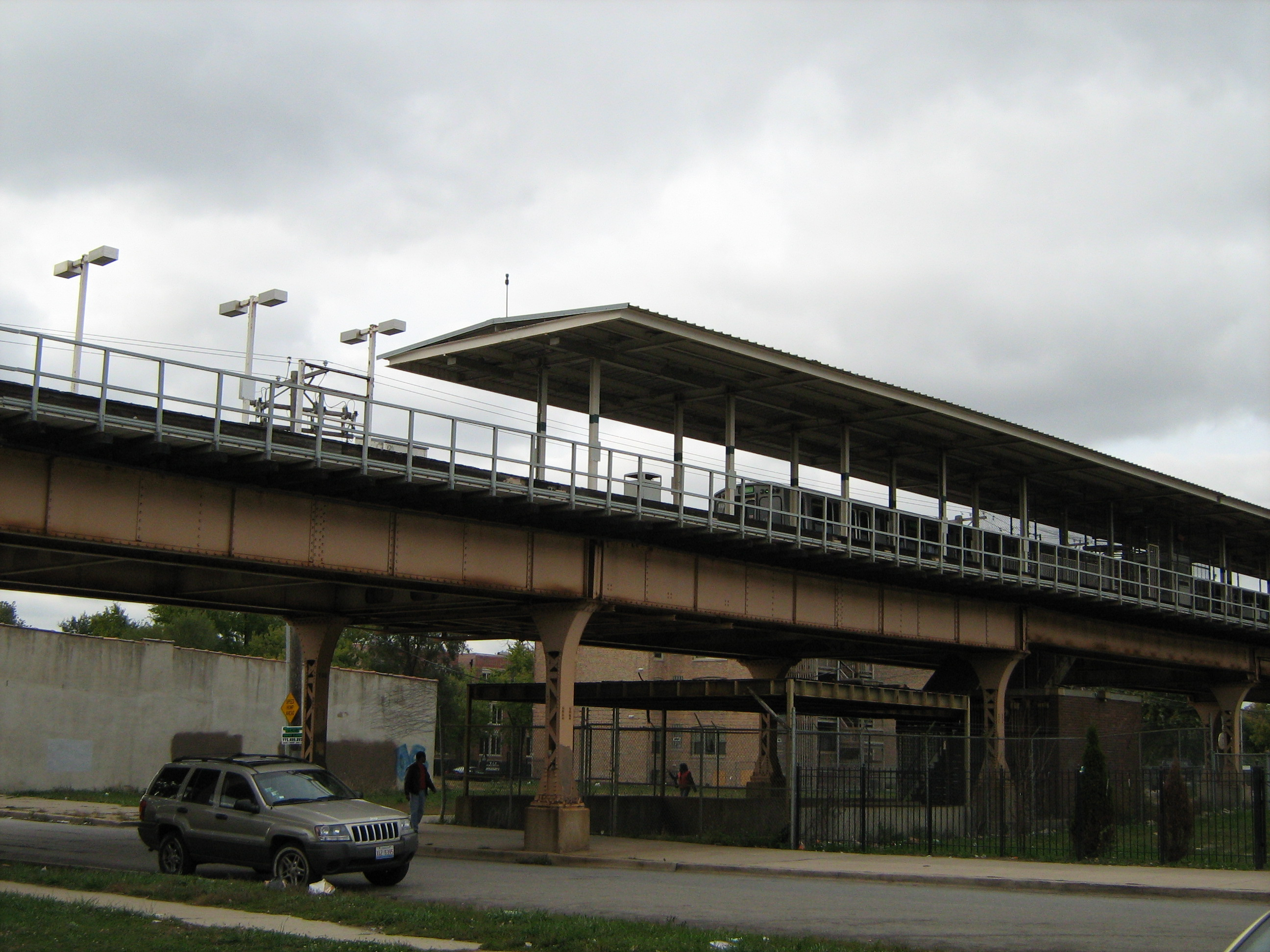
- 58th before demolition in 2012

General information
- Location: 320-24 East 58th Street; Chicago, Illinois 60637
- Coordinates: 41°47′22″N 87°37′05″W
- Owner: Chicago Transit Authority
- Line: South Side Elevated
- Platforms: 1 Island platform
- Tracks: 2 tracks

Construction
- Structure type: Elevated

History
- Opened: January 22, 1893; 133 years ago
- Closed: January 9, 1994; 32 years ago
- Rebuilt: 1983; 43 years ago

Former services
| Preceding station | Chicago "L" | Following station |
|---|---|---|
| Garfield toward Loop (Adams/Wabash) or Congress Terminal | South Side Elevated | through to Englewood and Jackson Park branches |
| through to South Side Elevated | Jackson Park branch | 61st toward Jackson Park |
| through to South Side Elevated | Englewood branch | State Closed 1973 toward Ashland |
Track layout
Location

58th was a station on the Chicago Transit Authority's Green Line in the Washington Park neighborhood of Chicago, Illinois. The station was located at 320-24 E. 58th Street. 58th opened on January 22, 1893, as part of the South Side Elevated Railroad's expansion to serve the World's Columbian Exposition. The station closed with the rest of the Green Line on January 9, 1994, but did not reopen with the rest of the Green Line on May 12, 1996, because of its close proximity to the Garfield station.

== History ==
58th opened on January 22, 1893, when the South Side Elevated Railroad expanded southward to serve the World's Columbian Exposition in Jackson Park. The station was designed by Myron H. Church and built by the Rapid Transit and Bridge Construction Company, and it included elements of the Queen Anne style as well as the Chicago school. The original station house was brick and had a half-cone bay at the top of the building. 58th was built with an island platform, an anomaly among the South Side Elevated stations which generally had two side platforms. The original canopy was hump-shaped; this style was common among South Side Elevated stations at the time, but the canopy at 58th outlasted most of the original canopies at other stations.

When the Englewood Branch became part of the South Side Elevated in 1905, 58th became the transfer station between the Englewood and Jackson Park branches. At the start of the branch's operation, the South Side Elevated ran shuttle trains from 58th to the end of the branch, and passengers had to take Jackson Park trains from 58th. Express service from Englewood to downtown was established in 1906, and the shuttle to 58th was discontinued in 1911. 58th remained the transfer station between the two branches until A/B skip stop service went into effect in 1949. The station then became an "A" station and only served Englewood trains, and 51st became the transfer station between the two branches. 58th shortly became the transfer point again in 1993 when the CTA discontinued skip-stop service.

The CTA began to rebuild 58th in 1983. The platform was rebuilt first, and the original canopy was replaced with a new canopy which extended over the rails. The station house was scheduled to be rebuilt in 1986; it was paid for by a separate project because of the CTA's lack of funds for renovation. However, the project was delayed until 1988. The original station house was then removed, but a new station house was never built, and temporary turnstiles were installed on the platform.

== Closure and demolition ==
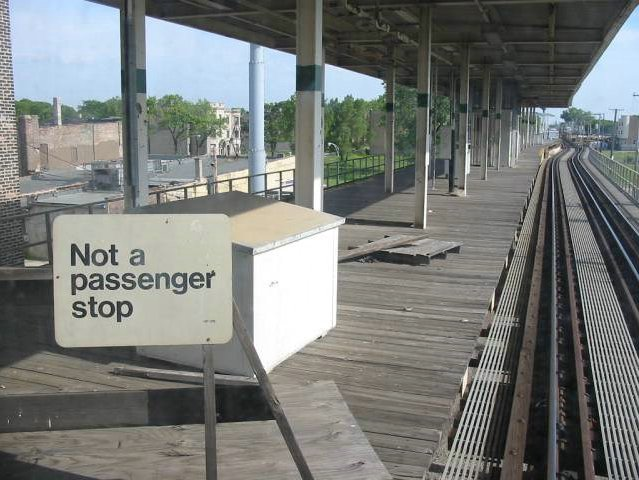
Platform of 58th station in 2004

On January 9, 1994, 58th closed along with the other Green Line stations so the line could be rebuilt. 58th did not reopen with the rest of the Green Line on May 12, 1996, because of its close proximity to Garfield, and the CTA's desire to cut operating costs after the renovation. The station remained abandoned, but the platform and stairs remained for 18 years after closure. Because federal funds were used in the station's renovation, the CTA was required to keep 58th in operable condition and could not demolish what remained of the station until the federal grant amount had amortized. By 2010, however, the platform decking had deteriorated to the point that it could no longer be used even by CTA personnel. As a result, the CTA demolished what remained of the station between late January and early February 2012. Since then, the only remnants of the station are the wide extra space between the two Green Line tracks, as well as the elevated structure around the station site.
