= Bellwood station (Chicago Aurora and Elgin Railroad) =

Former rail station in Bellwood, Illinois

BELLWOOD 3800W 700S
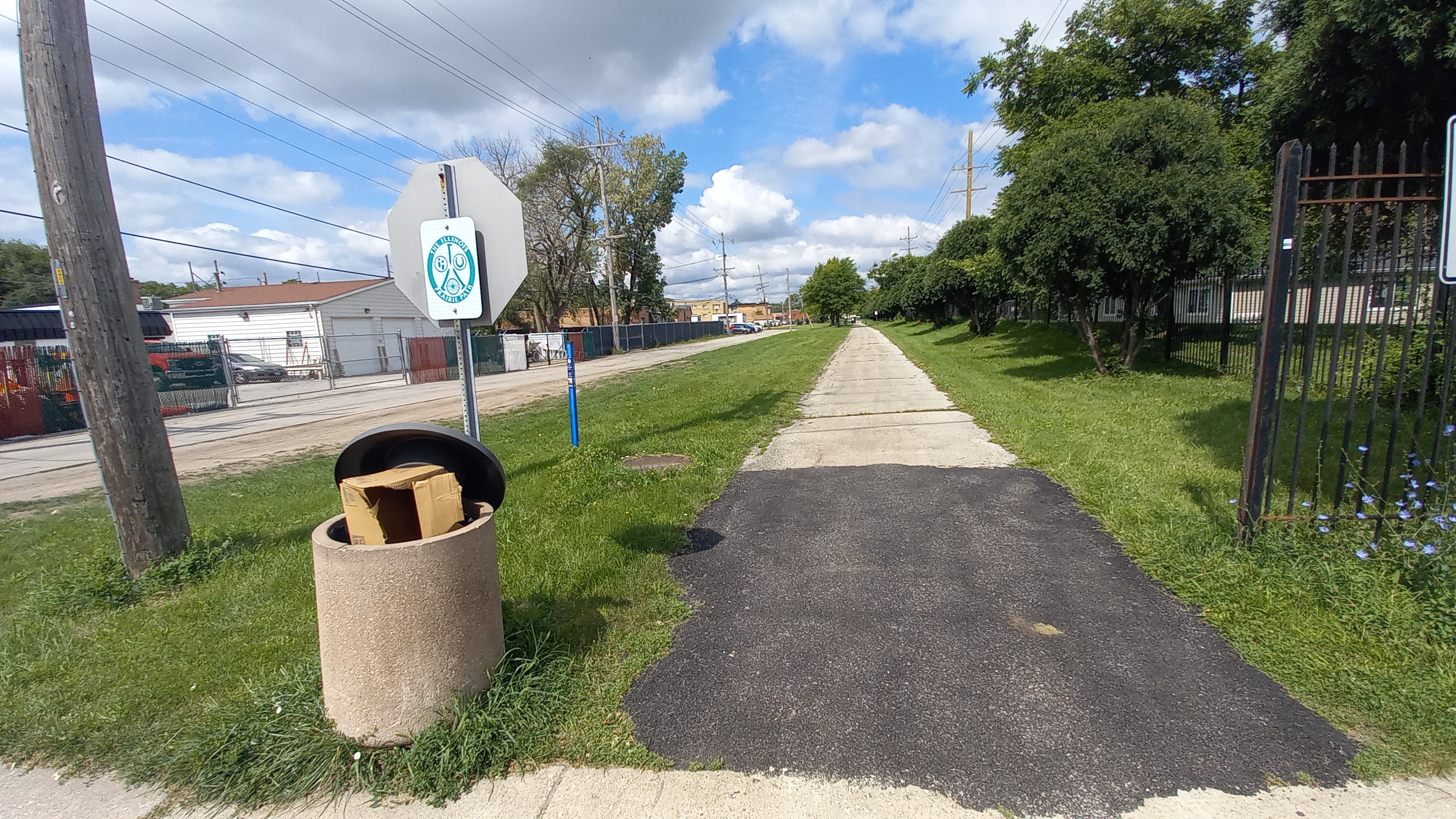
- The site of the now-demolished Bellwood station

General information
- Location: Bellwood Avenue, Bellwood, Illinois, United States
- Coordinates: 41.87936°N 87.87824°W

History
- Opened: August 25, 1902 (CA&E); October 1, 1926 ("L")
- Closed: December 9, 1951 ("L"); July 3, 1957 (CA&E)

Passengers
- 1948: 116,488 ▼18.65% ("L")
- Rank: 199 out of 223

Former services
Preceding station	Chicago Aurora and Elgin Railroad	Following station
Garden Home toward Wheaton	Main Line	25th Avenue One-way operation between 1926 and 1951 toward Chicago
Harrison Street toward Mount Carmel	Mount Carmel Branch	Terminus
Preceding station	Chicago "L"	Following station
Harrison toward Mannheim/22nd	Westchester branch	25th Avenue toward Des Plaines
Location

Bellwood was a station on the Chicago Aurora and Elgin Railroad (CA&E) serving Bellwood, Illinois, from 1902 to 1957. An adjacent station, serving the Westchester branch, existed for rapid transit purposes on the Chicago "L" between 1926 and 1951.

Bellwood was one of the original stations of the Aurora, Elgin, and Chicago Railroad (AE&C) when it opened in 1902. In 1906, a branch to Mount Carmel Cemetery opened from Bellwood. The Westchester branch, originally conceived as a bypass route for the CA&E, opened in 1926 and replaced the Mount Carmel branch for passenger service. Bellwood served as the dividing line between local service provided by the CA&E and that provided by the "L"; it was the westernmost station where eastbound boarding was prohibited onto CA&E trains, as well as the westernmost station where passengers having boarded from Chicago stations were not allowed to alight.

== History ==
The Aurora, Elgin, and Chicago Railroad (AE&C) opened on August 25, 1902, with 15 stations between Aurora and 52nd Avenue in Chicago. One of its stations was at Bellwood Avenue in Bellwood. Officials for the AE&C incorporated the Cook County and Southern Railroad in order to link the AE&C with Mount Carmel and Oak Ridge Cemeteries and provide funeral train service. This railway entered service on March 18, 1906, operating the Mount Carmel branch diverging from the main line at Bellwood.

The Westchester branch was originally conceived as a bypass line for the CA&E from its main line; it opened on October 1, 1926, and was operated as a rapid transit line by the Chicago Rapid Transit Company (CRT) as part of the Chicago "L". The branch diverged from the main line just east of the Bellwood station, so a new one was built immediately to the south of the CA&E's facilities to serve the "L". The Mount Carmel branch closed on October 31 to passenger traffic, being replaced by bus. Rather than connect to Bellwood, this new bus service connected to the Westchester branch at Roosevelt.

After the Westchester branch was built, the CA&E stopped boarding eastbound passengers at Bellwood, or alighting westbound passengers. The Chicago Transit Authority (CTA), a publicly owned entity that had taken over the "L" from the CRT in 1947, discontinued the Westchester branch on December 9, 1951. At this time, the CA&E resumed full bi-directional service at Bellwood. The CA&E itself ended service midday on July 3, 1957, discontinuing all traffic at Bellwood. The station was eventually demolished.

== Station details ==
After the Westchester branch was discontinued, the station house that had been constructed for it was moved to the CA&E's eastbound platform, whose shelter was then moved to the westbound platform.

=== Operations ===
CA&E tickets were sold for Bellwood station at nearby Wordman's Drug Store, where they could be purchased between 7 a.m. and 9:30 p.m. on Mondays and 9 a.m. to 9:30 p.m. on other days. Tickets could also be purchased on the train, but as of 1950 such tickets attracted a ten-cent ($1.13 in 2021) surcharge for full-fare tickets.

=== "L" ridership ===
In the last year individual station ridership statistics were taken for the Westchester branch, 1948, Bellwood served 116,488 passengers, an 18.65 percent decline from the 143,198 passengers served in 1947. This made it the most-ridden station on the branch west of 17th Avenue, although throughout the 1940s a good amount of the branch's traffic was handled by on-train conductors rather than station agents. With respect to the "L" as a whole, its 1948 performance made it the 199th-busiest of 223 "L" stations that were at least partially-staffed at the beginning of the year, whereas in 1947 it had been the 200th-busiest of 222 such stations. (Note: Several other stations on the Westchester branch, as well as the Niles Center branch, were permanently unstaffed and thus did not collect ridership statistics. Several stations closed on the "L" during 1948. Exchange station on the Stock Yards branch discontinued statistics after 1946, but adjacent Racine station began collecting them in 1948.)

== Works cited ==
- CTA Rail Entrance, Annual Traffic, 1900–1979 (Report). Chicago: Chicago Transit Authority. October 1, 1979.
- Weller, Peter (1999). The Living Legacy of the Chicago Aurora and Elgin. San Francisco: Forum Press. ISBN 0-945213-41-7 – via Internet Archive.
