= Harrison station (CTA Westchester branch) =

Former Chicago "L" station

HARRISON 10200W 600S

General information
- Location: Harrison Street near Bellwood Avenue; Westchester, Illinois, US
- Coordinates: 41.87104°N 87.87868°W
- Owner: Chicago Transit Authority (1947–1951); Chicago Rapid Transit Company (1926–1947)
- Line: Westchester branch
- Platforms: 1 island platform
- Tracks: 2

History
- Opened: October 1, 1926
- Closed: December 9, 1951

Passengers
- 1948: 38,630 ▼22.36% (CTA)
- Rank: 215 out of 223

Former services
| Preceding station | Chicago "L" | Following station |
|---|---|---|
| Roosevelt toward Mannheim/22nd | Westchester branch | Bellwood toward Des Plaines |
Location

Harrison was a rapid transit station on the Chicago "L" between 1926 and 1951 located on the Westchester branch.

== History ==
The Westchester branch opened on October 1, 1926, with a station on Harrison Street. It continued in service until replaced by bus service on December 9, 1951.

== Station details ==
The station was at ground level, with a Craftsman- and Prairie School-influenced station house with exterior stucco walling and an island platform.

=== Ridership ===
Throughout its existence, ridership statistics were collected at Harrison for only four years: 1933 and 1946–1948. In 1933, Harrison collected 5,160 passengers. For the last three years in which station-specific Westchester ridership statistics were collected, Harrison served a respective 21,375, 49,758, and 38,630 patrons. Its 1947 performance made it the third-least patronized of 222 "L" stations that were at least partially staffed, ahead of only Campbell and Randolph/Market on the Lake Street Elevated, while in 1948 it was the 215th-busiest of 223 such stations. (Note: Several other stations on the Westchester branch, as well as the Niles Center branch, were permanently unstaffed and thus did not collect ridership statistics. Several stations closed on the "L" during 1948. Exchange station on the Stock Yards branch discontinued statistics after 1946, but adjacent Racine station began collecting them in 1948.)

== Works cited ==
- CTA Rail Entrance, Annual Traffic, 1900–1979 (Report). Chicago: Chicago Transit Authority. October 1, 1979.
