= Kenwood branch =

Segment of the Chicago "L" (1907–1957)

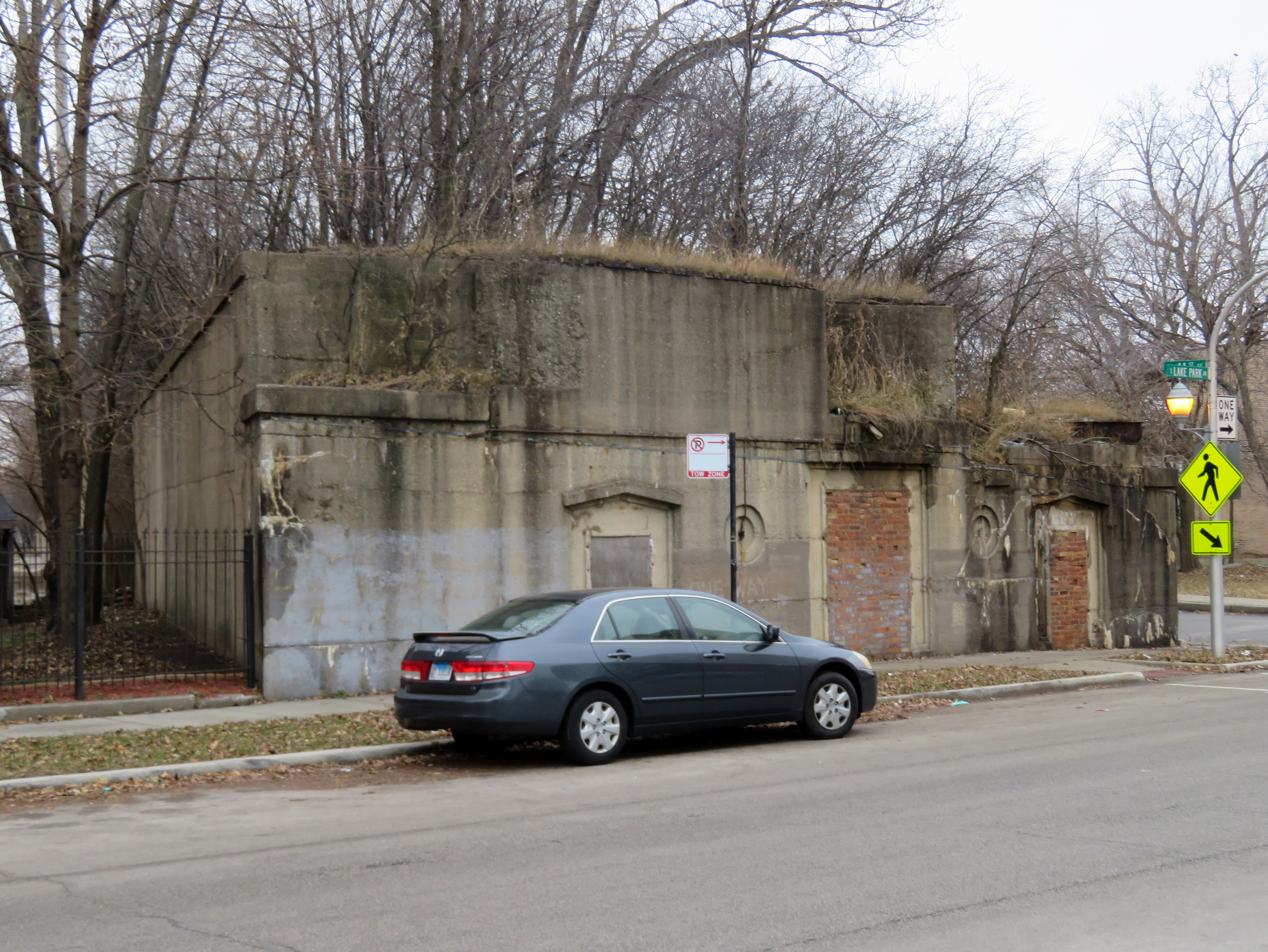
- Remains of Ellis/Lake Park station in December 2018

Overview
- Locale: Chicago, Illinois, U.S.
- Termini: Indiana; 42nd Place
- Stations: 6

Service
- Type: Rapid transit
- System: Chicago 'L'
- Operator(s): Chicago Transit Authority (1947–1957); Chicago Rapid Transit Company (1924–1947); South Side Elevated Railroad (1907–1924)

History
- Opened: September 20, 1907
- Closed: December 1, 1957

Technical
- Line length: 1.25 mi (2.01 km)
- Character: Elevated
- Track gauge: 4 ft 8 1/2 in (1,435 mm)
- Electrification: Third rail, 600 V DC

The Kenwood branch was a rapid transit line which was part of the Chicago 'L' system from 1907 to 1957. The branch served the Kenwood neighborhood of Chicago and consisted of six elevated stations. It opened on September 20, 1907 and closed on December 1, 1957.

== Operations ==
The Kenwood branch was a 1.25-mile (2.01 km) elevated line which served six stations. The branch began at the Indiana station, which was a transfer point for the South Side Main Line and Stock Yards branch. It ran eastward along two tracks to a terminal at 42nd Place and Oakenwald Avenue in Kenwood. A storage yard was located at the eastern end of the branch. The branch was built on a concrete embankment, which it shared with the Chicago Junction Railway. Initially, service on the branch consisted primarily of 42nd Place-Indiana shuttles and 42nd Place-Loop locals; 42nd Place-Loop express trains were occasionally run. Loop service was eventually through-routed on the Ravenswood Line, and some trains were through-routed on the Stock Yards branch in the later years of the line.

== History ==
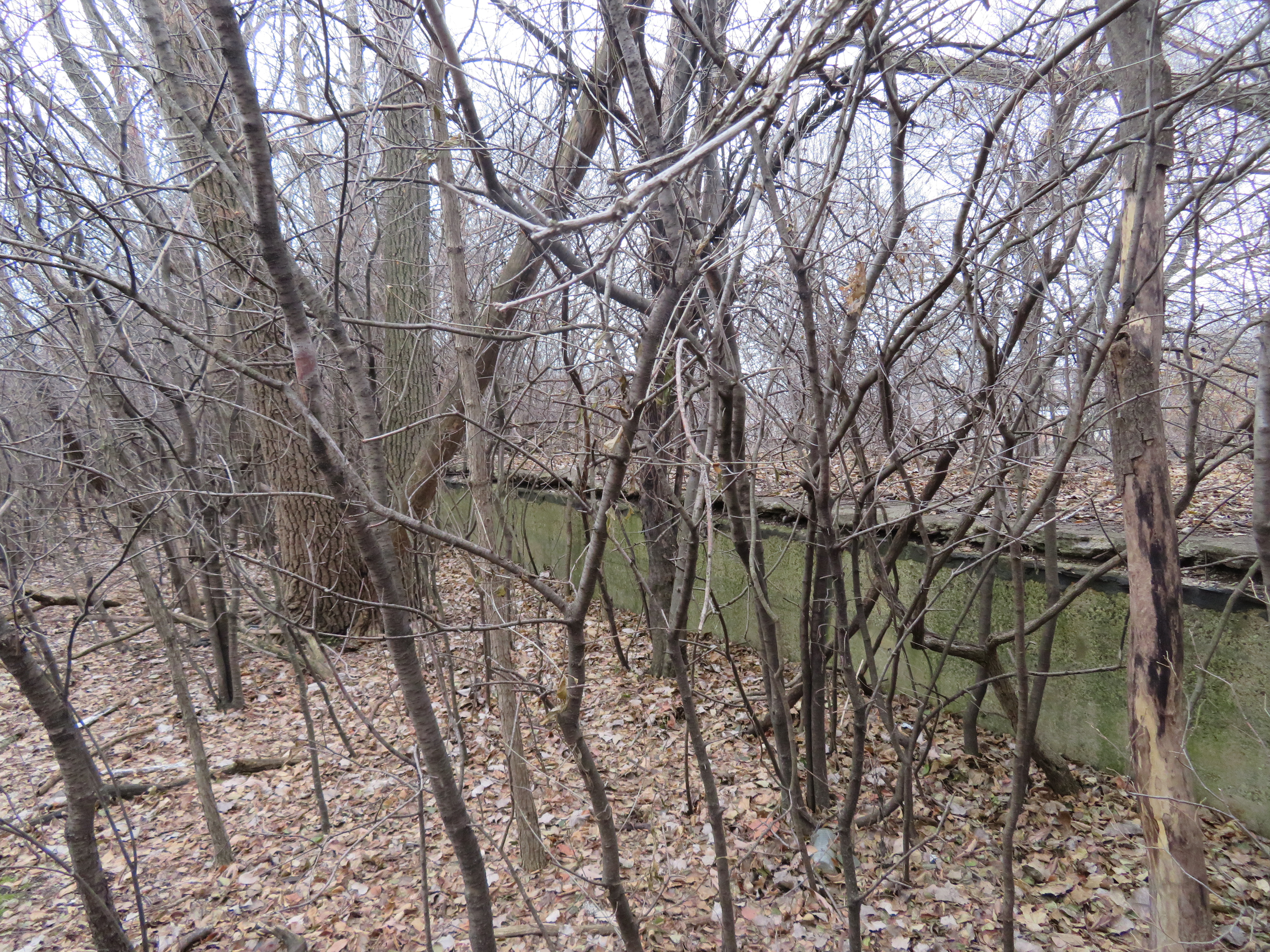
Remains of the platform at Vincennes station seen in 2018

The predecessor of the Kenwood branch was a freight line the Union Stock Yards and Transit Company built in 1864, which paralleled 40th Street between the Union Stock Yards and the Illinois Central Railroad. The freight line began passenger service in 1882, which continued along the line until 1904. In 1903, the Chicago City Council passed a measure to elevate the 40th Street line as part of an effort to remove grade crossings from Chicago railroads. The Chicago Junction Railway was formed to bear the costs of the elevation, and the task of running passenger trains on the line shifted to the South Side Elevated Railroad. The elevated Kenwood branch ultimately opened on September 20, 1907.

The new line led to increased residential development in Kenwood, a mostly white-collar neighborhood when the line opened. Crosstown service through the Ravenswood line began in 1913; in 1931, this service was changed to a Kenwood-Wilson routing. Shuttle service on the line was discontinued between 1943 and 1949.

In the 1930s, the Chicago Junction Railway stopped regularly maintaining the branch due to financial difficulties; since it did not operate trains on the line, it cared little about its upkeep. The Chicago Rapid Transit Company, which by then had taken control of operations, replied to the Chicago Junction's actions by refusing to pay rent on the line. The Chicago Junction took the CRT to eviction court over the matter; the Illinois Commerce Commission initially ruled that the Chicago Junction had rights to operate on the line, but federal bankruptcy court ultimately granted the CRT a stay on eviction. The CRT agreed to assume maintenance of the line and deducted maintenance costs from its rent. The CTA took over the line from the CRT in 1947. Ridership on the line began to fall in the early 1950s, and the line continued to deteriorate from the ongoing lack of maintenance. The CTA contemplated refurbishing the Kenwood branch in 1956, but the costs of modernizing the branch were prohibitive, and it ultimately closed the line on December 1, 1957.

== Later uses and abandonment ==
Upon closing the line, the CTA sealed the stations but left the branch itself intact. The Chicago Junction Railway continued to use the branch for freight service, and its freight track remained until the 1960s. The right-of-way along the Kenwood branch was assumed by the Penn Central Railroad, Conrail, and CSX at various points; Penn Central used part of the line to access a warehouse near King Drive until the 1980s. The embankment for the Kenwood branch remained mostly in place; only the steel structures at the termini, the street crossings, and the section between Cottage Grove and Drexel Boulevard have been removed since the branch's closure.

=== Proposed rail trail ===
The Bronzeville Trail is a proposed rail trail that will run along the currently abandoned railroad embankment. It is planned to run from the intersection of 40th Street/Dearborn Street to the intersection of 41st Street/Lake Park Avenue. The pedestrian bridge east of the latter intersection provides a connection to the Lakefront Trail. The Bronzeville Trail Task Force was formed in 2020 as a leading advocacy group in favor of the trail.

== Station listing ==
Kenwood branch stations
Station	Location
Indiana	4003 S. Indiana Avenue
South Parkway	King Drive (South Parkway) and 40th Street
Vincennes	Vincennes Avenue and 40th Street
Cottage Grove/Drexel	41st Street, between Cottage Grove Avenue and Drexel Boulevard
Ellis/Lake Park	41st Street, between Ellis Avenue and Lake Park Avenue
42nd Place	42nd Place and Oakenwald Avenue
