= Mount Carmel Cemetery (Hillside, Illinois) =

Cemetery in Hillside, Illinois

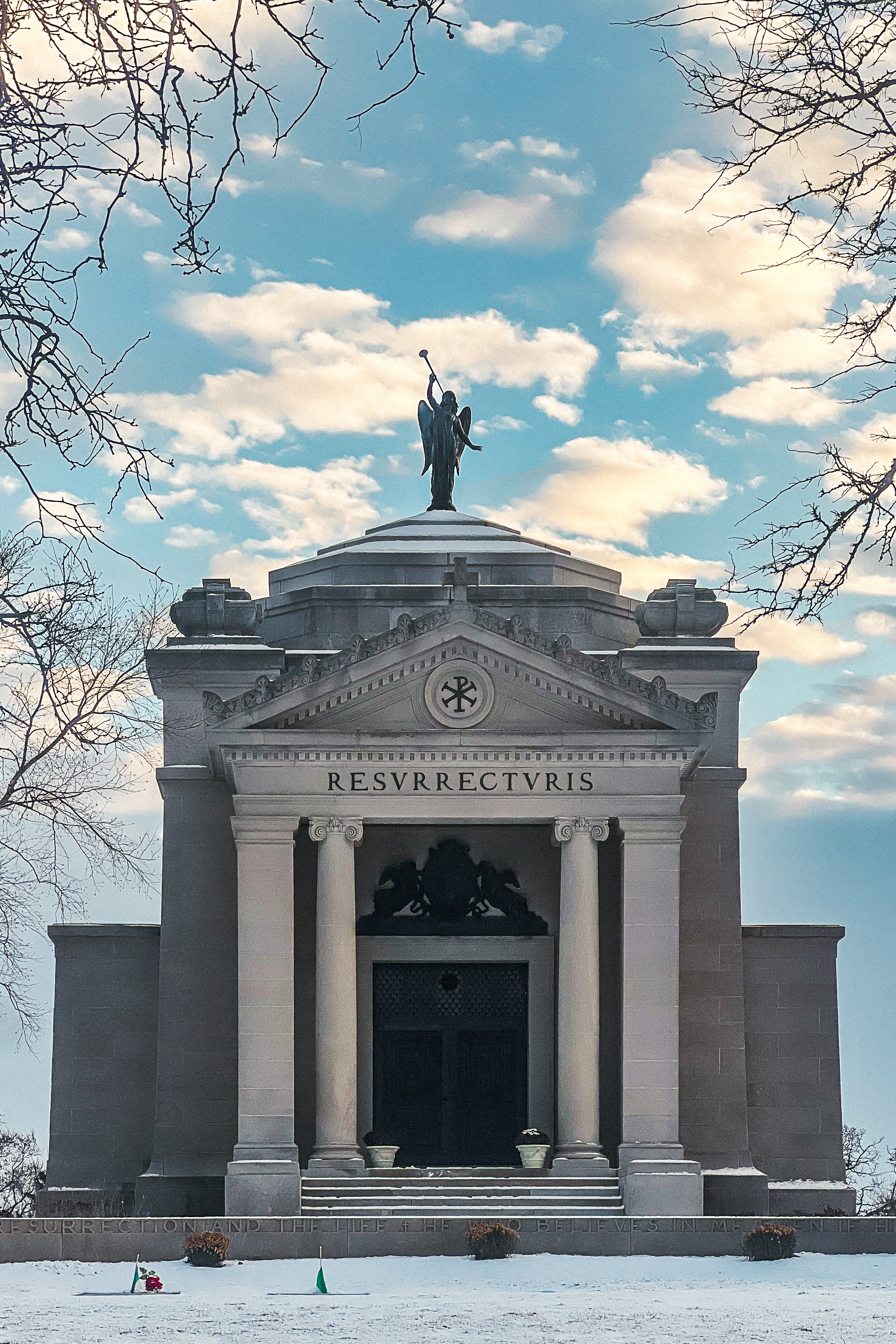
- The Bishops' Mausoleum at Mount Carmel Cemetery
- Interactive map of Mount Carmel Cemetery

Details
- Established: 1901
- Location: Hillside, Illinois
- Country: United States
- Coordinates: 41°51′51″N 87°54′27″W
- Type: Roman Catholic
- Owned by: Roman Catholic Archdiocese of Chicago
- Size: 214 acres (0.87 km^{2})
- No. of graves: 226,000+
- Website: Mount Carmel

Mount Carmel Cemetery is a Catholic cemetery in the Chicago suburb of Hillside, Illinois, United States. Mount Carmel is an active cemetery, located within the Archdiocese of Chicago. It is located near the Eisenhower Expressway (Interstate 290) at Wolf and Roosevelt Roads. Another Catholic cemetery, Queen of Heaven, is located immediately south of Mount Carmel, across Roosevelt Road.

Mount Carmel Cemetery was consecrated in 1901 and is currently 214 acres (0.87 km^{2}) in size. It maintained its own office until 1965, when it combined operations with Queen of Heaven Cemetery. There are more than 226,275 remains at Mount Carmel and about 800 remains are interred there annually.

Mount Carmel Cemetery is also the final resting place of numerous local organized crime figures, the most notorious being Al Capone. In all, the cemetery grounds contain over 400 family mausoleums.

Many remains at the cemetery are people of Italian ancestry. The cemetery contains hundreds of headstones and monuments adorned with statues and elaborate engravings of religious figures such as Jesus, The Blessed Mother, and many saints as well as angels. Many of the tombstones contain photographs of the inhabitants, reflecting a custom common in Italian cemeteries.

The cemetery contains Commonwealth war graves of two World War I soldiers of the Canadian Army.

== Mausoleum of the Bishops and Archbishops of Chicago ==
The structure informally known as the Bishops' Mausoleum, designed by architect William J. Brinkmann, is located at Mount Carmel Cemetery and is the final resting places of the Bishops and Archbishops of Chicago; its formal name is the Mausoleum and Chapel of the Archbishops of Chicago, and it is the focal point of the entire cemetery, standing on high ground. The mausoleum was commissioned by Archbishop James Quigley and was constructed between 1905 and 1912. The roughly rectangular-shaped mausoleum has a stepped pyramidal roof surmounted by a statue of the Archangel Gabriel sounding his trumpet at the moment of the final resurrection. The mausoleum is designed as a Romanesque building outside with a domed Romanesque Classical chapel inside, complete with altar, religious murals, clerestory windows providing light, and the crypts flanking the altar on either side. The Papal and U.S. flags also flank the altar. Brinkmann did not design the lavish interior, however, although he was more than capable, as evidenced by his interior for Our Lady of Sorrows Basilica. Instead, Archbishop Quigley engaged one of the foremost religious architects of the day, Aristide Leonori, the noted for his 1899 design of the Mount St. Sepulchre Franciscan Monastery in Washington, D.C., as well as the interiors of early 20th century Mediterranean churches. For the mausoleum chapel interior, Leonori relied heavily on the use of marble and mosaics to give the chapel a Roman look while still referencing Celtic, Nordic and Slavic saints in the design, thus reflecting the archdiocese's many ethnic groups and national churches.

The most recent interment was the body of Cardinal Joseph Bernardin after his death in 1996 from liver and pancreatic cancer. Cardinal Bernardin had visited the chapel a few months before his death to select the site of his own crypt; choosing a spot to one side of the late Cardinal John Cody. Bernardin was said to have remarked, "I've always been a little left of Cody."

== Notable interments ==
- Cardinal Joseph Bernardin
- Cardinal John Cody
- Bishop James Duggan
- Dennis Farina – actor
- Archbishop Patrick Feehan – first archbishop of Chicago
- Julia Buccola Petta – also known as "The Italian Bride"
- Jack Powell – MLB baseball player
- Bishop William J. Quarter – first bishop of Chicago
- Archbishop James Edward Quigley
- Ken Silvestri – MLB baseball player and coach
- Cardinal Samuel Stritch
- Victims of the Iroquois Theatre Fire (1903)
- Victims of the Eastland Disaster (1915)

=== Organized crime ===
- Al Capone
- Frank Capone
- Ralph Capone
- Vincent Drucci
- Sam Giancana
- Genna Brothers – Sam, Vincenzo, Pete, "Bloody" Angelo, Antonio, and Mike "The Devil"
- Jake Lingle – murdered journalist and mob associate
- Antonio Lombardo – Chicago mobster and consigliere to Al Capone
- "Machine Gun" Jack McGurn (aka Vincent DeMora)
- Charles Nicoletti
- Frank Nitti
- Dean O'Banion
- Frank Rio
- Roger Touhy – NW suburban Chicago mobster and beer baron, rival of Al Capone and wrongly convicted through Capone's influence
- Earl "Hymie" Weiss

== Funeral train service ==
Mount Carmel

General information
- Location: Section 37 near Section 17, Mount Carmel Cemetery near Wolf Road

History
- Opened: March 18, 1906
- Closed: Passenger service ended October 31, 1926, last funeral train run in 1934

Former services
Preceding station	Chicago Aurora and Elgin Railroad	Following station
Terminus	Mount Carmel Branch	Oak Ridge toward Bellwood
Location

The Chicago Aurora and Elgin Railroad, an interurban linking Chicago with its western suburbs, began construction of a branch line to serve Mount Carmel and Oak Ridge Cemeteries. The terminal at Mount Carmel was located inside the cemetery grounds at section 37 and was constructed during February 1906 for an opening on March 18. The branch, usually single-track, split into two tracks at the Cemetery, whose station included a primary and secondary platform. In addition to funeral trains, the branch offered daily shuttles between Mount Carmel and Bellwood operating at 30-minute intervals during weekdays. On Sundays and holidays, direct service from the Wells Street Terminal in downtown Chicago was provided.

The Westchester branch opened on October 1, 1926, near where the Mount Carmel branch ran. This led to passenger service being discontinued on October 31 in favor of a bus line connecting to the Westchester branch at Roosevelt. Funeral service continued, but the cemetery no longer wished to have a station in it and a new one was constructed on the opposite side of Wolf Road for funeral parties; this was itself demolished in the late 1930s, as express service from Wells Street was discontinued in 1931 and the last funeral train is thought to have run in July 1934.
