= 43rd station =

Chicago "L" station

43rd 4300S 300E
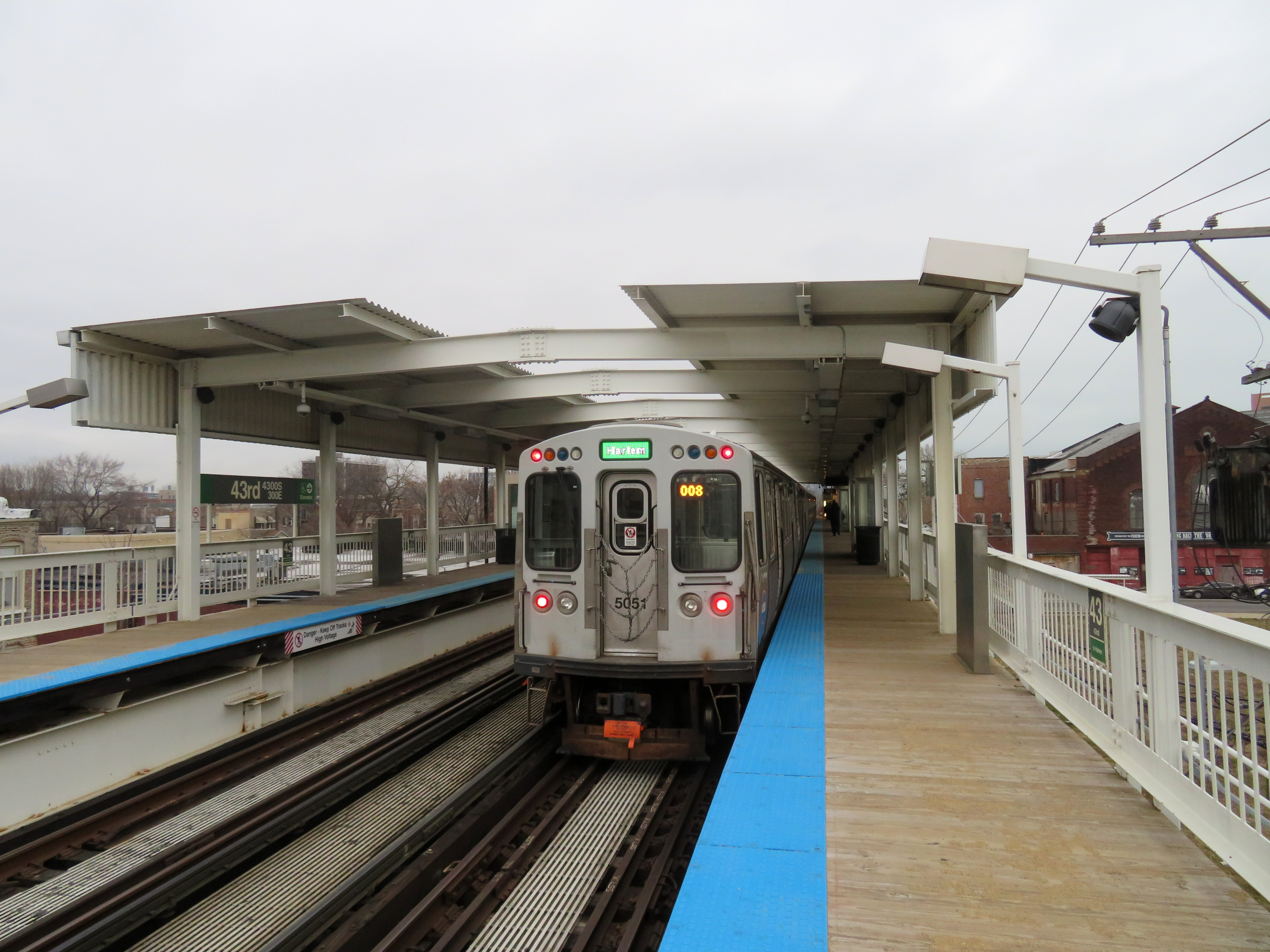
- A Harlem-bound train at 43rd station in 2018

General information
- Location: 314 East 43rd Street, Chicago, Illinois 60653
- Coordinates: 41.816462°N 87.619021°W
- Owner: Chicago Transit Authority
- Line: South Side Elevated
- Platforms: 2 side platforms
- Tracks: 2 tracks
- Connections: CTA bus

Construction
- Structure type: Elevated
- Cycle facilities: Yes
- Accessible: Yes

History
- Opened: August 15, 1892; 133 years ago
- Rebuilt: 1976 (new station house); 1990 (new platforms); 1996 (elevators added)

Passengers
- 2025: 215,361 ▲28.4%

Services
Preceding station	Chicago "L"	Following station
Indiana toward Harlem/Lake	Green Line	47th toward Ashland/63rd or Cottage Grove
Track layout
Location

43rd is a station on the Chicago Transit Authority's 'L' system in the Grand Boulevard community area in Chicago, Illinois, on the Green Line at 314 E 43rd Street, three blocks east of State Street. It opened on August 15, 1892, when the South Side Elevated Railroad extended service south to serve the World Columbian Exposition in 1893.

== History ==
The original station, designed by Myron H. Church, was a brick building with some Queen Anne-style elements. 43rd is typical of the other South Side Elevated Railroad elevated stations and consists of two side docks covered with tin canopies.

In July 1959, auxiliary exit stairs were added to the station to streamline passenger traffic on the wharves. Similar steps have been laid at the same time in the Indiana and 47th stations which, like 43rd, were busy at peak times.

On April 1, 1974, the main entrance to the station was destroyed by fire, and auxiliary exits were used to keep the station open. Work quickly began on a new entrance and in 1976, the new entrance was inaugurated. Some aspects of the station were very modern at the time, such as the large translucent porthole (more visible today) on the east side of the building, and the name of the station being oversized in the ticket hall.

Unlike the entrance to the station the wooden platforms were still the originals of 1892, they were replaced in 1990 during two months of work.

During the renovation of the Green Line from 1994 to 1996, little work was needed as 43rd station received new painting, the porthole on the wall is filled with bricks to be able to put elevators on the platform and make the station accessible to people with disabilities.

43rd station reopened with the rest of the Green Line on May 12, 1996, without work being finished. On February 27, 1997, the bridge over the platforms opened, thereby finishing the renovation.

== In media ==
The 43rd station appeared in the 1973 movie The Sting. Johnny Hooker (Robert Redford) escaped capture by Lt. William Snyder (Charles Durning) as Hooker runs through the station and jumps off the elevated platform, running through a Hooverville slum and into the Bronzeville neighborhood

== Bus connections ==
CTA

- 43 43rd
