= Canterbury station (CTA) =

Former Chicago "L" station

CANTERBURY 10200W 1600S

General information
- Location: Canterbury Street; Westchester, Illinois, US
- Coordinates: 41.856279°N 87.878010°W
- Owner: Chicago Transit Authority (1947–1951); Chicago Rapid Transit Company (1930–1947)
- Line: Westchester branch
- Platforms: 1 side platform
- Tracks: 1

History
- Opened: December 1, 1930
- Closed: December 9, 1951

Former services
Preceding station	Chicago "L"	Following station
Mannheim/22nd Terminus	Westchester branch	Roosevelt toward Des Plaines
Location

Canterbury was a rapid transit station on the Chicago "L" between 1930 and 1951. Located on the Westchester branch, it was part of a southern extension of the branch, which had opened in 1926.

== History ==
The Westchester branch opened in 1926, and was extended south to Mannheim/22nd on December 1, 1930, an extension that included Canterbury. This extension was served by a single car that shuttled passengers to and from Roosevelt; this was replaced in 1933 by a through-car service that coupled and uncoupled from Westchester trains at Roosevelt.

The branch continued in service until replaced by a bus service on December 9, 1951.

== Station details ==
The station had a single platform on the west side of the single track. The station house, which abutted the platform to its south and opened to the street, was of a Tudor Revival look, with arched windows on the walls and timbered eaves in the interior.

=== Ridership ===
Detailed ridership statistics were never collected for Canterbury; such statistics were collected for the Westchester branch as a whole, or for more patronized stations on the branch.
