= 51st station =

Chicago "L" station

51st 5100S 300E
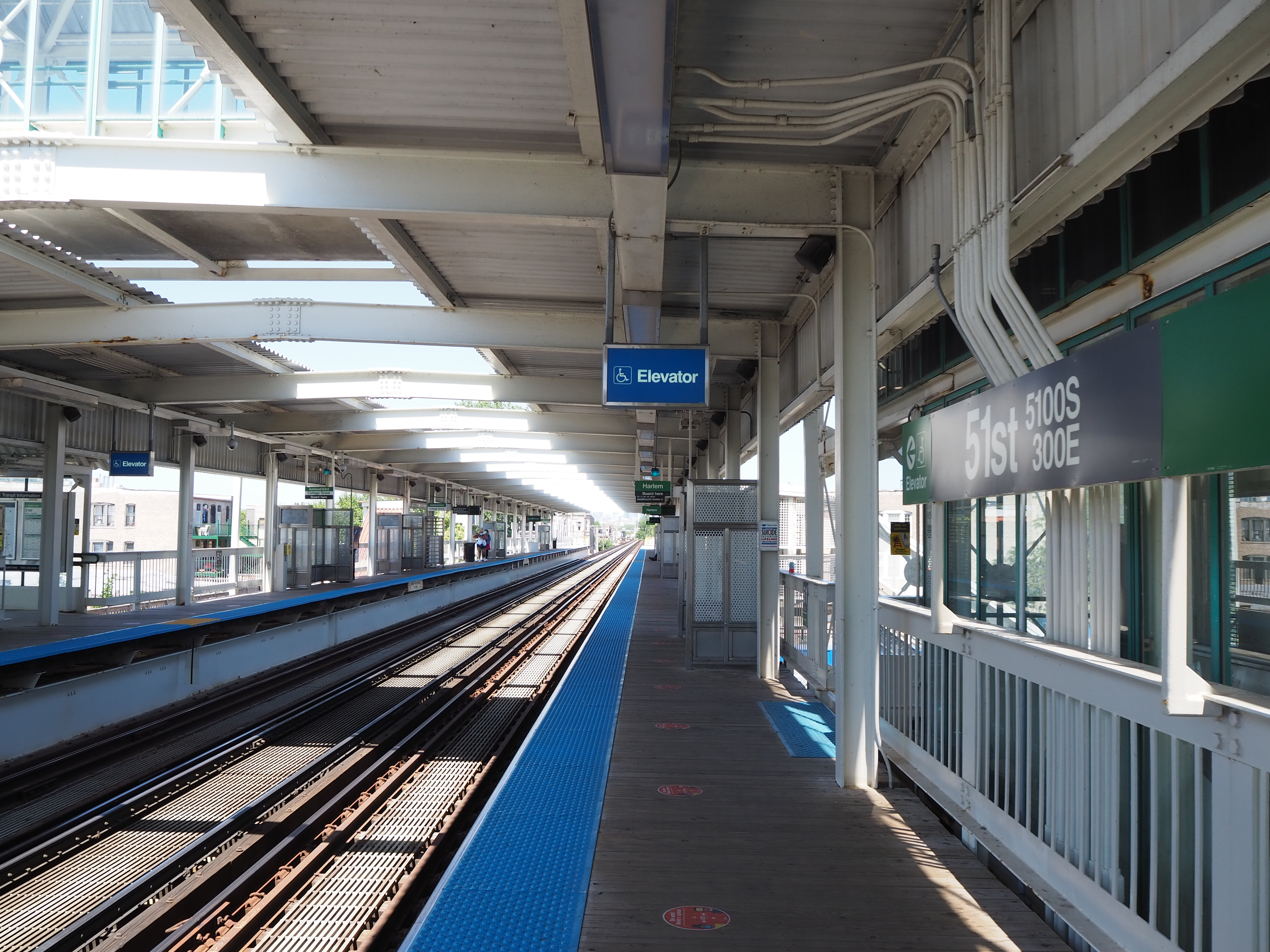

General information
- Location: 319 East 51st Street; Chicago, Illinois 60615
- Coordinates: 41.80220°N 87.61903°W
- Owner: Chicago Transit Authority
- Line: South Side Elevated
- Platforms: 2 side platforms
- Tracks: 2 tracks
- Connections: CTA bus

Construction
- Structure type: Elevated
- Cycle facilities: Yes
- Accessible: Yes

History
- Opened: August 28, 1892; 133 years ago
- Rebuilt: 1996–1997; 29 years ago

Passengers
- 2025: 206,207 ▲18.6%

Services
| Preceding station | Chicago "L" | Following station |
|---|---|---|
| 47th toward Harlem/Lake | Green Line | Garfield toward Ashland/63rd or Cottage Grove |
Track layout
Location

51st is a station on the Chicago Transit Authority's "L" system, located in Chicago, Illinois and serving the Green Line. It is situated at 319 E 51st Street, three blocks east of State Street. It opened on August 28, 1892.

== History ==
51st was built in 1892 when the South Side Elevated Railroad extended its line southward to serve the World's Columbian Exposition. The original station was designed by Myron H. Church and was a brick building with some elements of the Queen Anne style and a half-cone bay. The platforms at 51st were constructed like all other South Side Elevated Railroad platforms and consisted of wooden platforms with a tin canopy.

When the A/B skip-stop system was introduced in 1949, 51st became an AB station. Because Garfield and 58th were B and A stations respectively, 51st became the transfer point between the Englewood (A) and Jackson Park (B) branches of the South Side Elevated. It served as the transfer point until 1982, when Garfield became an AB station.

51st closed in 1990, so its original canopies could be removed. The station underwent renovation during the 1994-96 Green Line closure, and its station house was replaced with a modern station house with a white and green tile facade. The platforms were also rebuilt, and steel and glass platforms replaced the old wooden ones. Construction at 51st was not completed until 1997, a year after the Green Line reopened.

== Services ==
51st is located in and serves the Washington Park and Grand Boulevard neighborhoods of Chicago along with the 47th and Garfield stations. Trains toward Harlem/Lake arrive every ten minutes, as do trains toward Ashland/63rd and Cottage Grove. During 2007, 340,624 passengers boarded at 51st, making it the 22nd busiest station on the Green Line.

51st has two elevated side platforms which serve the Green Line's two tracks. A station building on the south side of 51st Street houses the fare controls and connects to both platforms via stairs and elevators. Auxiliary exit stairs are located on the north side of 51st Street. The station is fully wheelchair accessible.

== Bus connections ==
CTA

- 15 Jeffery Local
