= 47th station (CTA Green Line) =

Chicago "L" station

47th 4700S 300E
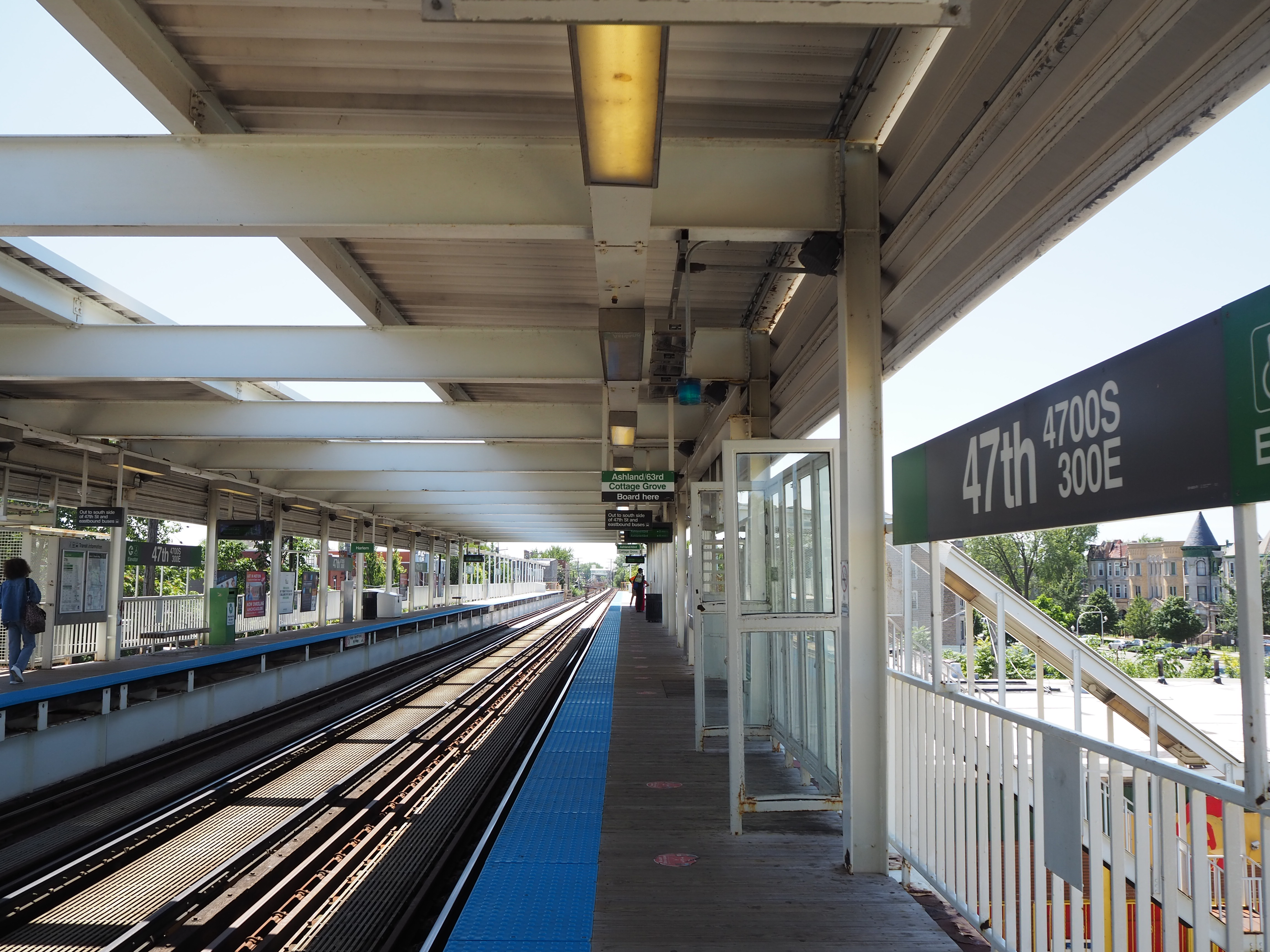

General information
- Location: 314 East 47th Street; Chicago, Illinois 60653
- Coordinates: 41.80940°N 87.61909°W
- Owner: Chicago Transit Authority
- Line: South Side Elevated
- Platforms: 2 side platforms
- Tracks: 2 tracks
- Connections: CTA bus

Construction
- Structure type: Elevated
- Cycle facilities: Yes
- Accessible: Yes

History
- Opened: August 15, 1892; 133 years ago
- Rebuilt: 1982, 1996

Passengers
- 2025: 228,431 ▲24.3%

Services
Preceding station	Chicago "L"	Following station
43rd toward Harlem/Lake	Green Line	51st toward Ashland/63rd or Cottage Grove
Track layout
Location

47th is a station on the Chicago Transit Authority's "L" system, located in the Grand Boulevard community area of Chicago, Illinois and serving the Green Line. It is situated at 314 E 47th Street, three blocks east of State Street. It opened on August 15, 1892, when South Side Elevated Railroad extended its service south to serve the Chicago World's Fair in 1893.

== History ==
The original station, designed by Myron H. Church, was a brick building with some Queen Anne-style elements. 47th is typical of the other South Side Elevated Railroad elevated stations and consists of two side docks covered with tin canopies.

In July 1959, auxiliary exit stairs were added to the station.

In the early 1980s, it was decided that, given its state of disrepair, the station was to be completely replaced. In July 1981, a US$1 million project began with the demolition of the station's main entrance. In December of that same year, the southbound platform was reopened, and work began on the north platform. On May 7, 1982, it reopened in a much more utilitarian form than the original station, and normal service was resumed.

On February 21, 1993, the South Side Englewood-Jackson Park Line, formerly associated with the line to Howard to the north, is diverted by the Loop and Lake Street towards its current terminus of Harlem.

On January 9, 1994, the Green Line closed for a two-year renovation project. All stations on the line, including 47th, closed for renovation. Since 47th had been rebuilt in 1982, the station was only repainted and two elevators were built to make it accessible to people with disabilities. 47th station reopened with the rest of the Green Line on May 12, 1996.

== Bus connections ==
CTA

- 47 47th

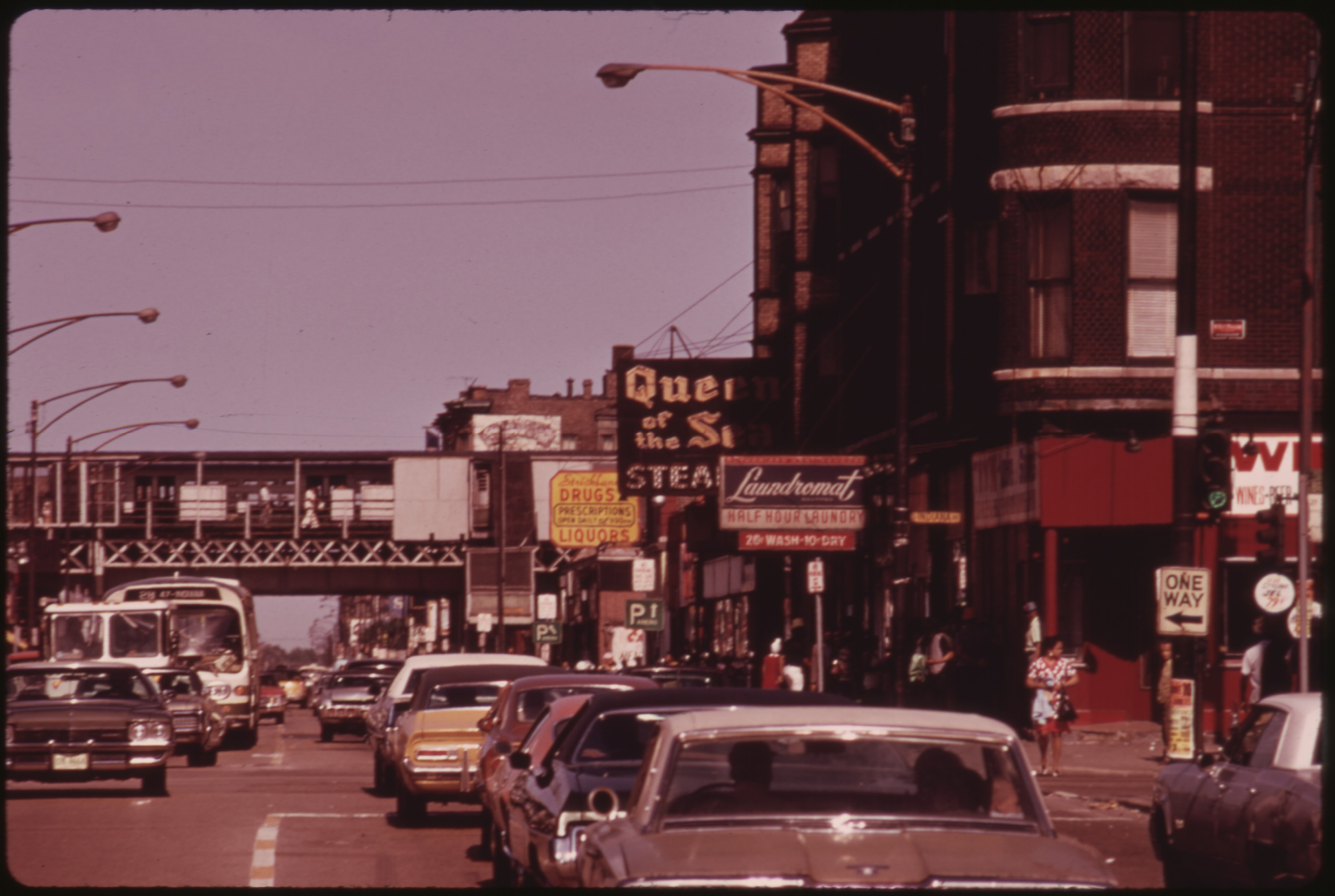
The station in 1973
