= Roosevelt station (CTA Westchester branch) =

Former Chicago "L" station

ROOSEVELT 10200W 1200S

General information
- Location: Roosevelt Road near Bellwood Avenue; Westchester, Illinois, US
- Coordinates: 41.86335°N 87.87838°W
- Owner: Chicago Transit Authority (1947–1951); Chicago Rapid Transit Company (1926–1947)
- Line: Westchester branch
- Platforms: 1 island platform
- Tracks: 2

History
- Opened: October 1, 1926
- Closed: December 9, 1951
- Former names: Westchester

Passengers
- 1948: 90,188 ▼18.94% (CTA)
- Rank: 205 out of 223

Former services
| Preceding station | Chicago "L" | Following station |
|---|---|---|
| Canterbury toward Mannheim/22nd | Westchester branch | Harrison toward Des Plaines |
Location

Roosevelt, originally known as Westchester, was a rapid transit station that served the Westchester branch of the Chicago "L" between 1926 and the branch's discontinuation in 1951. It was the branch's terminus from its opening until the 1930 extension of the line to 22nd Street.

== History ==
The Westchester branch, originally intended as a bypass route of the Chicago Aurora and Elgin Railroad (CA&E), opened on October 1, 1926. As actually built, it was a branch from the CA&E's main line rather than a bypass, and as the CA&E had no immediate need for such a branch it was operated as part of the Chicago "L" by the Chicago Rapid Transit Company.

The branch terminated at Roosevelt Road, which terminal was simply called "Westchester". Work began on an extension to 22nd Street near Mannheim Road in 1927; the extension led to Cook County's insistence that the "L" be grade-separated from Roosevelt Road; the grade separation was complete by September 1929, but the extension itself would not open until December 1, 1930. The extension was initially a shuttle to and from Roosevelt, but was through-routed in 1933.

The branch was replaced with a bus service by the CTA on December 9, 1951.

== Station details ==
The station house was influenced by the Prairie and Craftsman schools of architecture. After the grade separation was carried out, the station house was located on the north side of Roosevelt Road near a parking lot; passengers went through the station house and across a bridge above the tracks and parallel to Roosevelt Road, which descended to an island platform between the tracks.

=== Ridership ===
In the last year individual Westchester station ridership statistics were collected, 1948, Roosevelt served 90,188 riders, an 18.94 percent decline from the 111,267 served in 1947. Roosevelt was the most distant station on the branch where statistics were collected; no such figures were ever collected for Canterbury or Mannheim/22nd. Globally for the Chicago "L", Roosevelt's 1948 performance made it the 205th-busiest of 223 "L" stations that were at least partially staffed at the beginning of the year, whereas in 1947 it had been the 204th-busiest of 222 such stations. (Note: Several other stations on the Westchester branch, as well as the Niles Center branch, were permanently unstaffed and thus did not collect ridership statistics. Several stations closed on the "L" during 1948. Exchange station on the Stock Yards branch discontinued statistics after 1946, but adjacent Racine station began collecting them in 1948.)

== Works cited ==
- CTA Rail Entrance, Annual Traffic, 1900–1979 (Report). Chicago: Chicago Transit Authority. October 1, 1979.
