= Julia Petta =

American housewife, known as the Italian Bride

Julia Buccola Petta (1892 – March 17, 1921) was a housewife who became known following her death as The Italian Bride. She was the daughter of Filomena Buccola and the wife of Matthew Petta. She died at the age of 29 in 1921 while giving birth to a stillborn son, Filippo.

== Burial ==
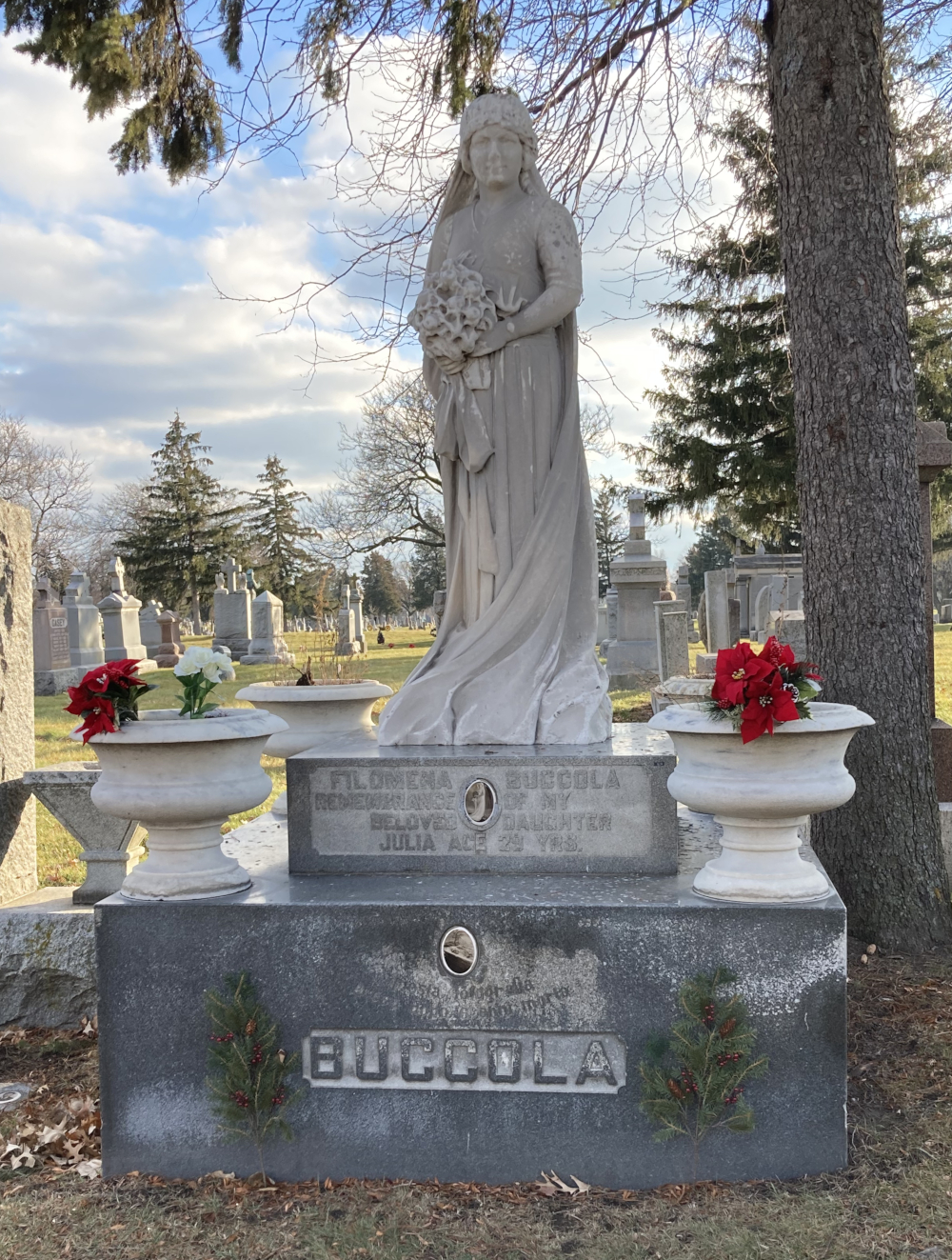
Petta's grave at Mount Carmel Cemetery

Following her death, Petta was buried at Mount Carmel Cemetery in the Chicago, Illinois suburb of Hillside. Petta was buried in her wedding dress. According to legend, soon after Petta's death, her mother Filomena began experiencing dreams in which Petta was telling her that she was still alive. No contemporary source has been found to back up the legend; according to her great-grandchildren, Filomena's nightmares may have started about five years later, when the family moved to Los Angeles. Filomena moved back and forth between Chicago and Los Angeles until she died in 1945.

Six years after Petta's death, Filomena secured permission to have the grave opened and her daughter exhumed. The coffin was found to have decomposed somewhat, but when it was opened Petta's body was still mostly intact, her son and the arm holding him had decayed. Her mother took a picture of Petta in her casket, which was placed on the monument and is still there to this day. The exact means by which Filomena secured permission to exhume the body is not known, but it is known that the costs of disinterment and the new monument were paid for, possibly to his chagrin, by Henry Buccola, Julia's brother. The new monument featured a photo of Petta in her wedding dress and was placed along with a statue of her based on this photo. The photo of Julia after exhumation also appears on the monument.

Some suggest friction existed between Mrs. Buccola and Julia's husband, Matthew, who remarried around the time of the disinterment; it's notable that Julia's married name appears nowhere on the monument, nor that of her stillborn child (though the name of her mother, who is buried nearby, appears twice).

Why Petta's body had not decayed much following burial has never been explained. Some have attributed Petta's condition upon being exhumed to her being incorruptible, while others have attributed the condition of her body to the type of soil found in the cemetery. In 1921 embalming chemicals had already been around for decades, so with a proper embalming and the body placed in an air-sealed coffin the corpse's organs will break down at a very slow pace. Observations of non-decayed bodies that have been deceased for years, even decades, is not uncommon. The exhumations of Abraham Lincoln, Solanus Casey and Eva Perón are a few famous examples.

Today Petta is among the more well-known people buried at Mount Carmel, along with prior Bishops and Archbishops of the Archdiocese of Chicago, and organized crime figures such as Al Capone.
