= Indiana station (CTA) =

Chicago "L" station

Indiana 4000S 200E
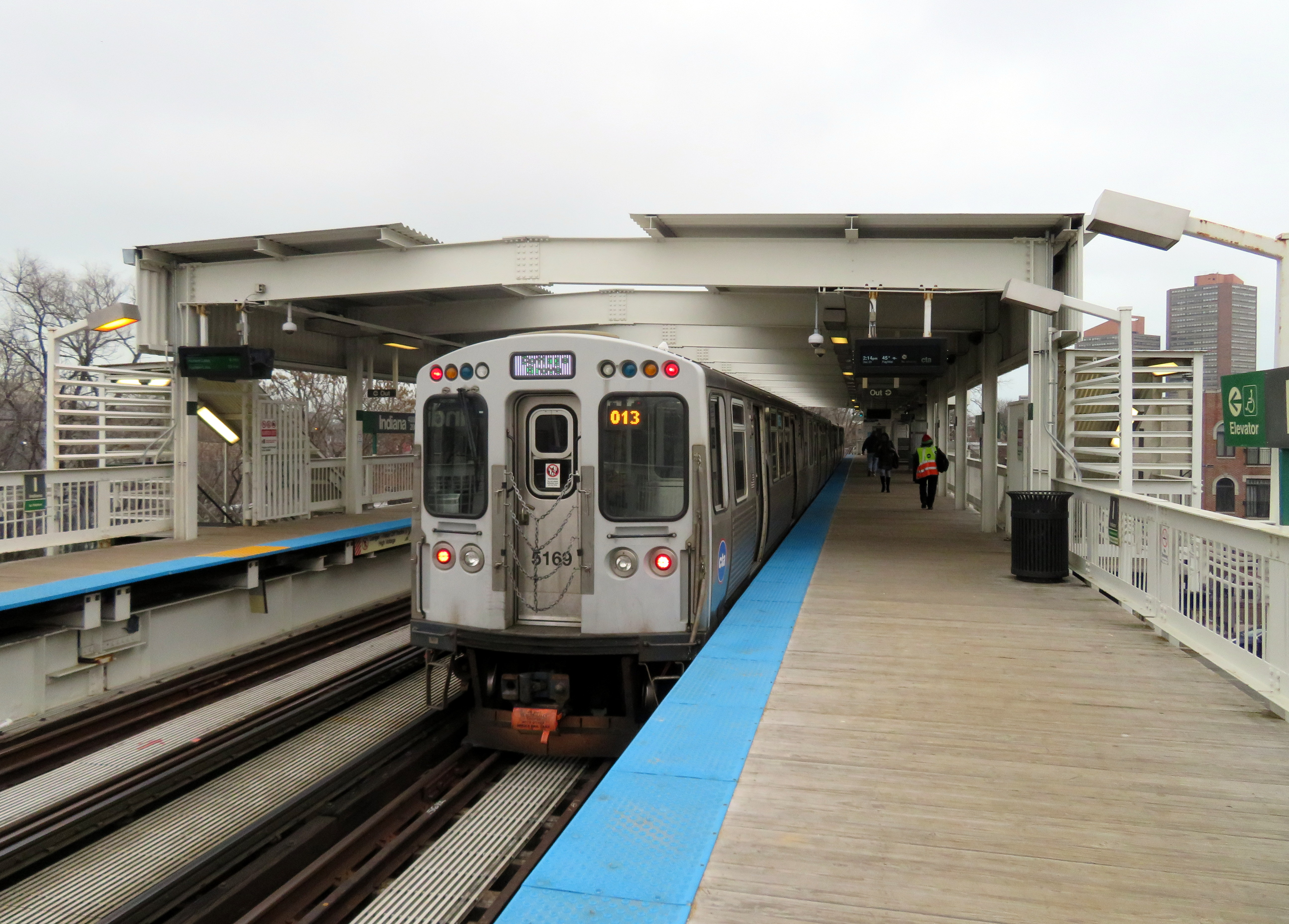
- A Cottage Grove-bound train at Indiana in December 2018

General information
- Location: 4003 South Indiana Avenue; Chicago, Illinois 60653
- Coordinates: 41.821732°N 87.621371°W
- Owner: Chicago Transit Authority
- Line: South Side Elevated
- Platforms: 2 side platforms
- Tracks: 2 tracks
- Connections: CTA bus

Construction
- Structure type: Elevated
- Cycle facilities: Yes
- Accessible: Yes

History
- Opened: August 15, 1892; 134 years ago
- Rebuilt: 1907, 1988 (new platforms), 2000–2001 (new station house)
- Former names: Fortieth

Passengers
- 2025: 159,072 ▲27%

Services
Preceding station	Chicago "L"	Following station
35th–Bronzeville–IIT toward Harlem/Lake	Green Line	43rd toward Ashland/63rd or Cottage Grove
Former services
Preceding station	Chicago "L"	Following station
Pershing Closed 1949 toward Loop (Adams/Wabash) or Congress Terminal	South Side Elevated	43rd toward 58th
Wallace Closed 1952 toward Stock Yards (Racine)	Stock Yards branch	Terminus
Terminus	Kenwood branch	South Parkway Closed 1957 toward 42nd Place
Track layout
Location

Indiana is a station on the Chicago Transit Authority's 'L' system, located in Chicago, Illinois. The station serves the Green Line and the Grand Boulevard neighborhood. It is situated at 4003 S Indiana Avenue, two blocks east of State Street. It opened on August 15, 1892. Before the two lines closed, Indiana was a transfer station from the Englewood-Jackson Park Line to the Stock Yards and Kenwood branches of the CTA. Indiana is one of only two remaining 'L' stations that were built on S-curves. Sheridan on the Red Line is the other.

== Bus connections ==
CTA

- 39 Pershing
