= Westchester branch =

Segment of the Chicago "L" (1926–1951)

Overview
- Status: Defunct
- Locale: Forest Park, Illinois; Maywood, Illinois; Bellwood, Illinois; Westchester, Illinois
- Termini: Des Plaines; Mannheim & 22nd
- Stations: 9

Service
- Type: Rapid transit
- System: Chicago "L"
- Operator(s): Chicago Transit Authority (1947–1951); Chicago Rapid Transit Company (1926–1947)

History
- Opened: October 1, 1926
- Closed: December 9, 1951

Technical
- Line length: 5.6 mi (9.0 km)
- Track gauge: 4 ft 8 1/2 in (1,435 mm) standard gauge
- Electrification: Third rail, 600 V DC
Route map
Westchester branch highlighted in gray

The Westchester branch was a rapid transit line which was part of the Chicago "L" system from 1926 to 1951. The branch served the suburbs of Forest Park, Maywood, Bellwood, and Westchester, and consisted of nine stations. It opened on October 1, 1926, and closed on December 9, 1951.

== Operations ==
The Westchester branch was 5.6 mi (9.0 km) long, and originated from the Garfield Park Branch at the Des Plaines station in Forest Park, Illinois. Initially the line terminated at Roosevelt Road near Bellwood Avenue. On December 1, 1930, service was extended to Mannheim/22nd. Service on the Westchester branch ended on December 9, 1951, and was replaced by the Westchester bus route (originally CTA route 17, now Pace Route 317), which largely mirrored the route of the Westchester branch, though the bus route only extended as far south as Canterbury Street.

== Station listing ==
Westchester Maywood branch stations
Station	Location
Des Plaines	711 S. Des Plaines Avenue, Forest Park
5th Avenue	5th Avenue near Quincy Street, Maywood
11th Avenue	11th Avenue and South Maywood Drive, Maywood
17th Avenue	17th Avenue and South Maywood Drive, Maywood
25th Avenue	25th Avenue and Maywood Drive, Maywood
Bellwood	Bellwood Avenue near Madison Street, Bellwood
Harrison	Harrison Street near Bellwood Avenue, Bellwood
Roosevelt	Roosevelt Road near Bellwood Avenue, Westchester
Canterbury	Canterbury Street near Westchester Boulevard, Westchester
Mannheim/22nd	Mannheim Road and 22nd Street, Westchester
