= Chicago Junction Railway =

American railroad operator

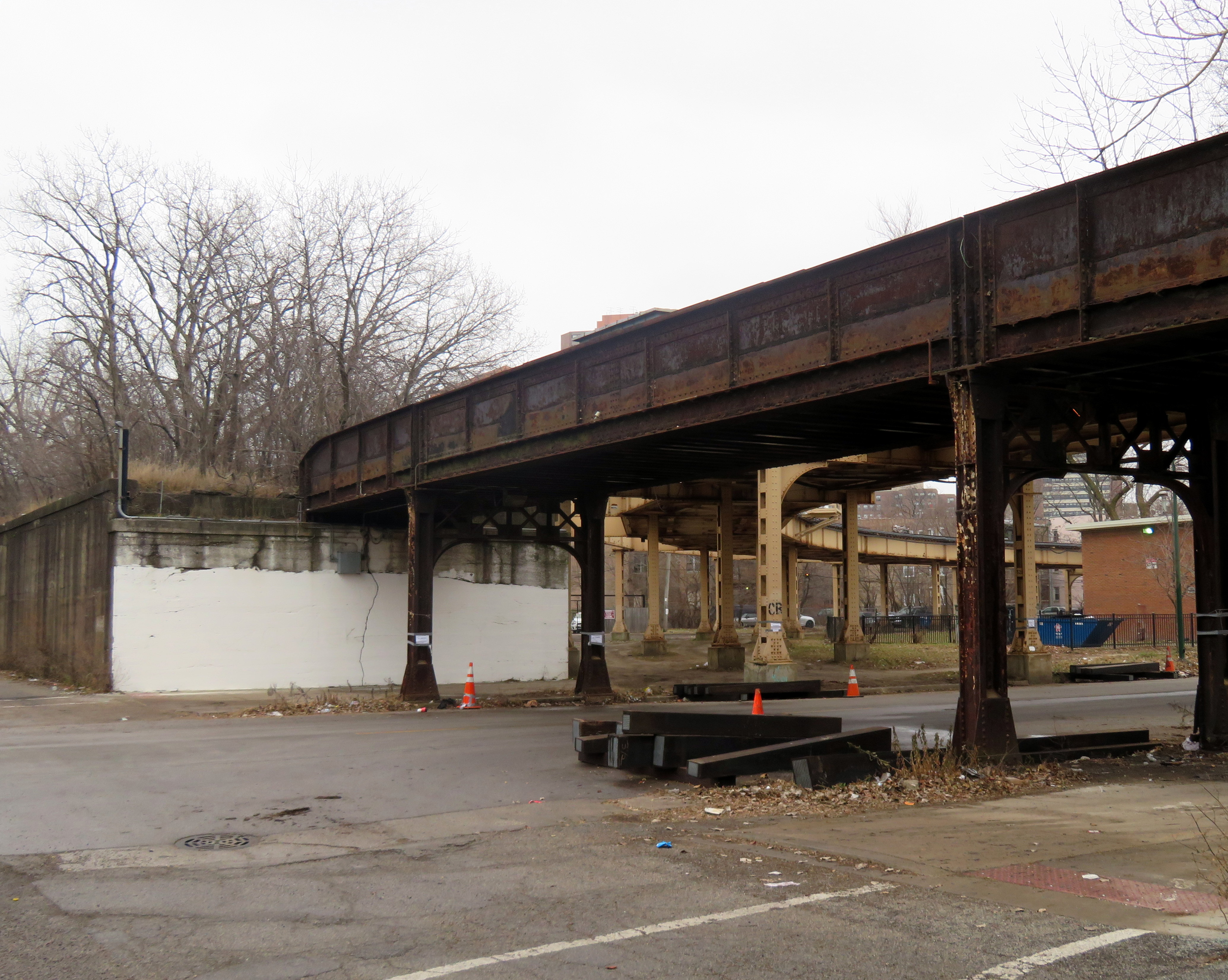
A former Chicago Junction Railway bridge over South Prairie Avenue near East 40th Street, seen in December 2018

The Chicago Junction Railway operated a switching and terminal railroad in Chicago, connecting the Union Stock Yards with most other railroads in the city. It also briefly operated an outer belt, which became the Indiana Harbor Belt Railroad in 1907. The New York Central Railroad acquired control of the company in 1922 and leased it to subsidiary Chicago River and Indiana Railroad. The line is now owned and operated by the Norfolk Southern Railway.

== History ==
When the Union Stock Yard and Transit Company of Chicago was incorporated in 1865 to consolidate the Chicago stock yards, its powers included the construction of a railroad outside the city limits (then Pershing Road and Western Avenue) to link the stock yards with the railroads entering Chicago south of Roosevelt Road.--north line of section 19-->. All nine of these railroads - the Chicago and Alton Railroad, Chicago, Burlington and Quincy Railroad, Chicago and Great Eastern Railway, Chicago and North Western Railway, Chicago and Rock Island Railroad, Illinois Central Railroad, Michigan Central Railroad, Michigan Southern and Northern Indiana Railroad, and Pittsburgh, Fort Wayne and Chicago Railway - had previously come to an agreement to finance the new property as a replacement for their individual yards. In December 1865, the new Union Stock Yards and railroad opened, the latter beginning at the Illinois Central near 43rd Street and heading west, largely along 40th Street, to the Chicago and Great Eastern, and then turning north to parallel the latter company's line in Campbell Avenue until it reached the Chicago and North Western Railway at Ogden Avenue. Prior to 1897, the Union Stock Yard and Transit Company (USY&T) operated its own property, except between 1887 and 1893, when a number of connecting carriers organized a transfer association to operate the railroad.

Subsidiary Chicago and Indiana State Line Railway was incorporated July 13, 1880, and soon constructed connections from the south border of the stock yards to the Grand Trunk Junction Railway and Chicago and Western Indiana Railroad, and from the north border along both sides of the South Fork South Branch Chicago River to near Archer Avenue. On December 15, 1897, the USY&T leased its railroad property to the Chicago and Indiana State Line. In August 1897, USY&T parent Chicago Junction Railways and Union Stock Yards Company bought control of the Chicago, Hammond and Western Railroad, which was building an outer belt line around Chicago, with trackage rights over the Terminal Railroad from Argo to the stock yards. The Chicago and Indiana State Line and Chicago, Hammond and Western merged on April 26, 1898, to form the Chicago Junction Railway, now operating two belt lines. However, on October 31, 1907, the outer belt line was sold to the Indiana Harbor Belt Railroad, and the Chicago Junction was back to the original line of the USY&T and the ca. 1880 extensions north and south of the stock yards.

On May 19, 1922, the New York Central Railroad bought control of the Chicago River and Indiana Railroad (CR&I) and simultaneously leased the Chicago Junction to the CR&I. The CR&I owned a line extending south and west from the Chicago Junction west of the stock yards to Elsdon. On August 26, 1958, the CR&I acquired the property of the Chicago Junction and lessor USY&T, and in 1976 the Consolidated Rail Corporation acquired the CR&I's lines, except for the old Chicago Junction east of Prairie Avenue in Kenwood, which had been abandoned in the 1960s. The Norfolk Southern Railway now owns and operates the line as the CR&I Industrial Track, except east of the Chicago Line, where Chicago Rail Link operates it east to Metra's Rock Island District and the rest has been abandoned.

== See also ==
- List of defunct Illinois railroads
