= Mannheim/22nd station =

Former Chicago "L" station

MANNHEIM/22^{ND} 10400W 2200S

General information
- Location: Mannheim Road and 22nd Street; Westchester, Illinois, US
- Coordinates: 41.849839°N 87.881389°W
- Owner: Chicago Transit Authority (1947–1951); Chicago Rapid Transit Company (1930–1947)
- Line: Westchester branch
- Platforms: 1 side platform
- Tracks: 1

History
- Opened: December 1, 1930
- Closed: December 9, 1951

Former services
Preceding station	Chicago "L"	Following station
Terminus	Westchester branch	Canterbury toward Des Plaines
Location

Mannheim/22nd was a rapid transit station on the Chicago "L" between 1930 and 1951. Located on the Westchester branch, it was the southern terminus of that branch, which was extended south to the station's location after having opened in 1926.

== History ==
The Westchester branch opened in 1926, and was extended south to Mannheim and 22nd Streets on December 1, 1930. This extension was served by a single car that shuttled passengers to and from Roosevelt; this was replaced in 1933 by a through-car service that coupled and uncoupled from Westchester trains at Roosevelt.

The branch continued in service until replaced by bus service on December 9, 1951.

== Station details ==
The station had a single platform on the east side of the single track. Originally there was a station house and an office for the real estate developer for Westchester on the platform, but these were removed between 1939 and 1946.

=== Ridership ===
Detailed ridership statistics were never collected for Mannheim/22nd; such statistics were collected for the Westchester branch as a whole, or for more patronized stations on the branch.

== Works cited ==
- CTA Rail Entrance, Annual Traffic, 1900–1979 (Report). Chicago: Chicago Transit Authority. October 1, 1979.
