= South Side Elevated Railroad =

Defunct railroad in Chicago, Illinois, USA

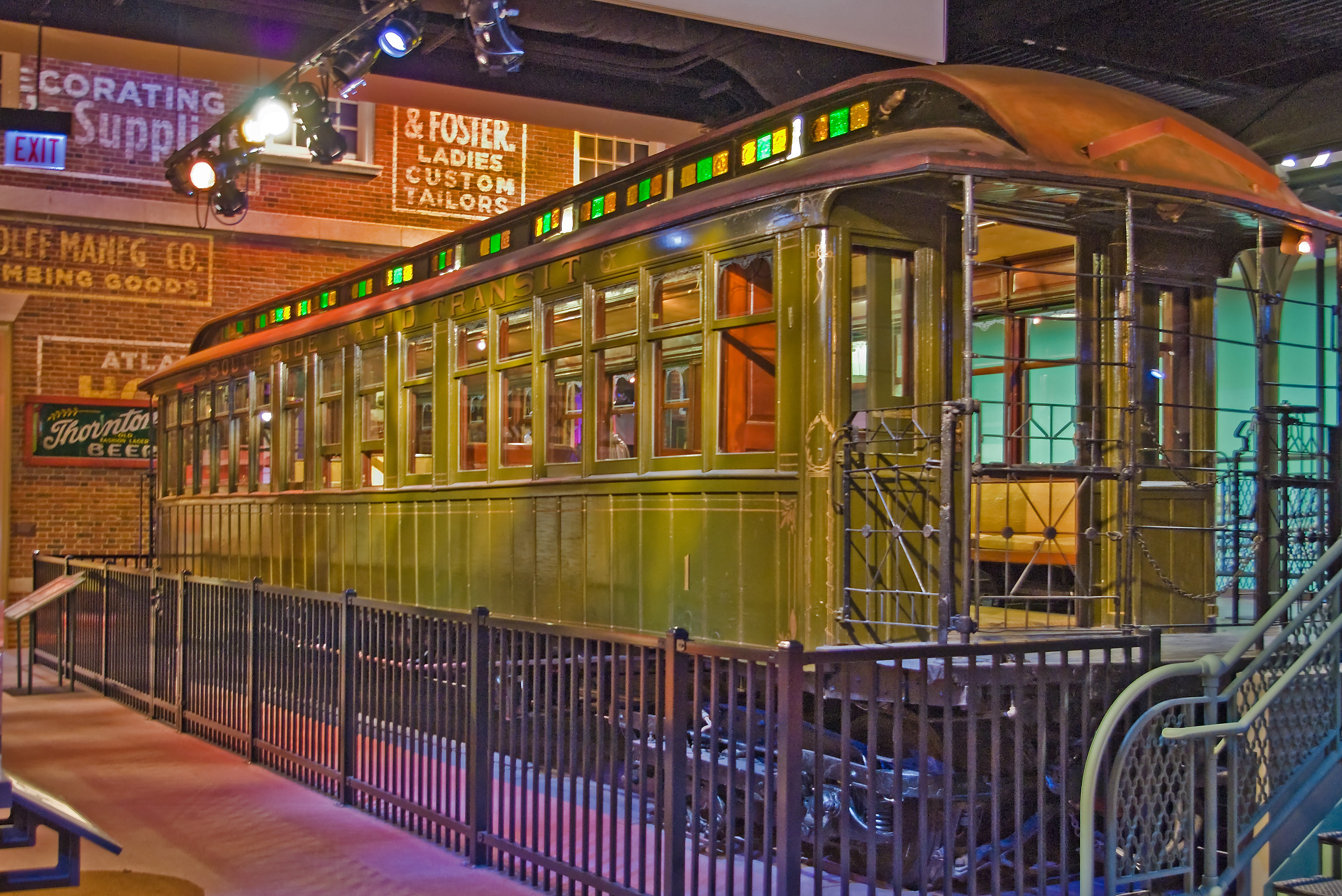
- South Side Rapid Transit railcar #1, one of the original passenger cars from the railroad, now on display at the Chicago History Museum

Overview
- Locale: Chicago, Illinois

Service
- Type: Rapid transit
- Services: Jackson Park; Englewood; Normal Park; Kenwood; Union Stock Yards
- Operator(s): Chicago and South Side Rapid Transit Railroad Company (1892–1897); South Side Elevated Railroad (1897–1924)

History
- Opened: June 6, 1892
- Closed: 1924 (merged into Chicago Rapid Transit Company)

Technical
- Line length: 1903: 10.7 miles (17.2 km)
- Track length: 1903: 19.4 miles (31.2 km)
- Character: Elevated
- Track gauge: 4 ft 8 1/2 in (1,435 mm) standard gauge
- Minimum radius: 90 ft (27.43 m)
- Electrification: 600 V DC third rail
Route map

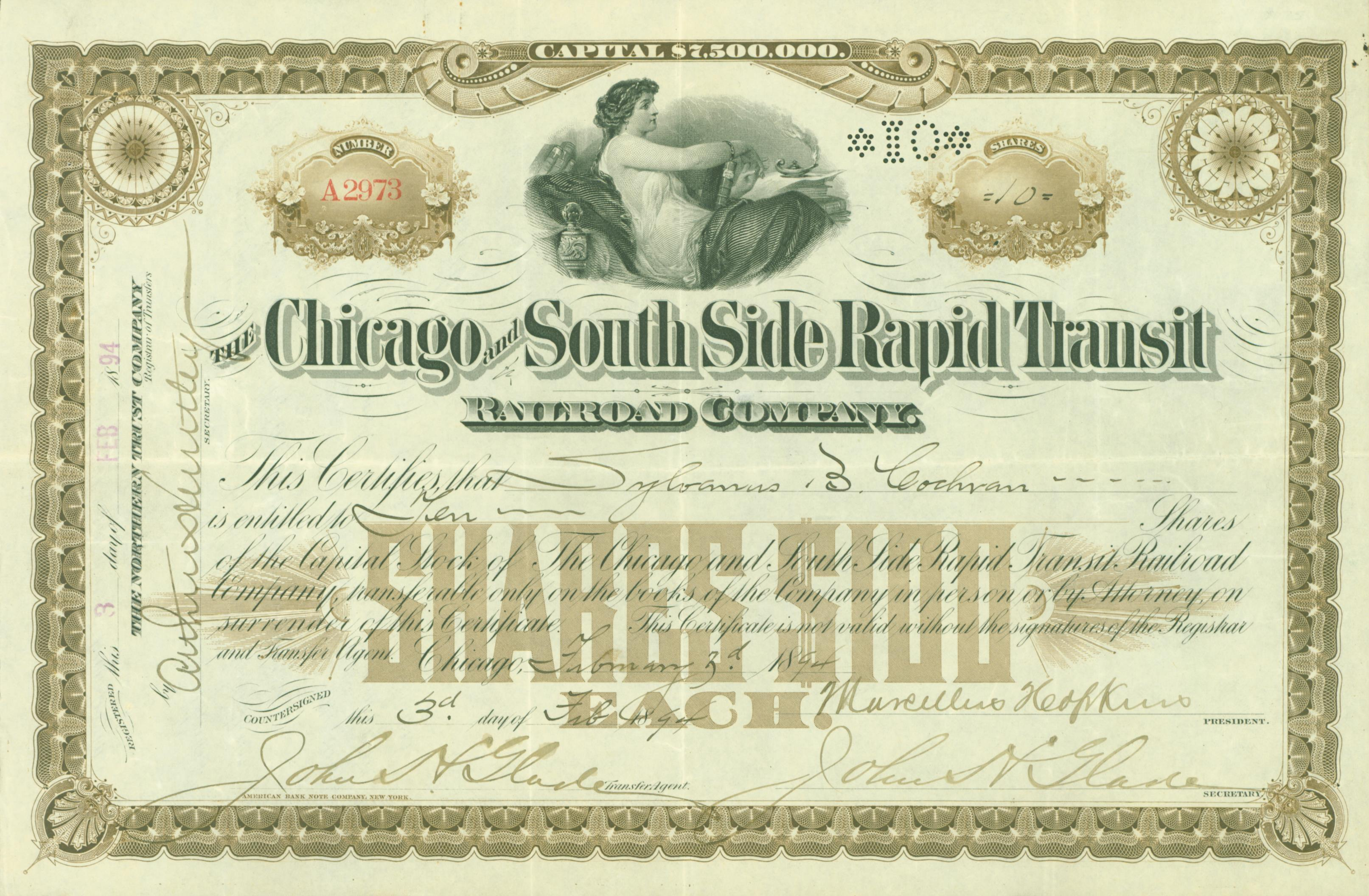
Share of the Chicago and South Side Rapid Transit Railroad Company, issued 3. February 1894

The South Side Elevated Railroad (originally Chicago and South Side Rapid Transit Railroad) was the first elevated rapid transit line in Chicago, Illinois. The line ran from downtown Chicago to Jackson Park, with branches to Englewood, Normal Park, Kenwood, and the Union Stock Yards. The first 3.6 miles (5.8 km) of the line opened on June 6, 1892. Much of its route is still used today as part of the Green Line of the Chicago "L" system.

== Chicago and South Side Rapid Transit Railroad ==
The Chicago and South Side Rapid Transit Railroad Company was incorporated on January 4, 1888, and secured a franchise from the City of Chicago on March 26 of that year to construct an elevated railroad between Van Buren Street and 39th Street (Pershing Road). The franchise required the company to build along a right of way immediately adjacent and parallel to one of the alleys from Van Buren Street to 37th Street, rapidly earning the line the nickname of the "alley L".

In April 1892, the city authorized the extension of the line as far south as 71st street. A further extension along 63rd Street was passed in April 1893. The total cost of construction was estimated at $6,750,000.

A 6-car train carrying 300 guests made the inaugural run along first section of the line—running between a station at 39th Street and the Congress Terminal downtown—on May 27, 1892, and the line opened to the public ten days later. Initially the 3.6-mile (5.8 km) journey from 39th street to downtown took 14 minutes and cost 5¢. The line was gradually extended over the following months, with the route reaching Jackson Park on May 12, 1893 to provide service to the World's Columbian Exposition.

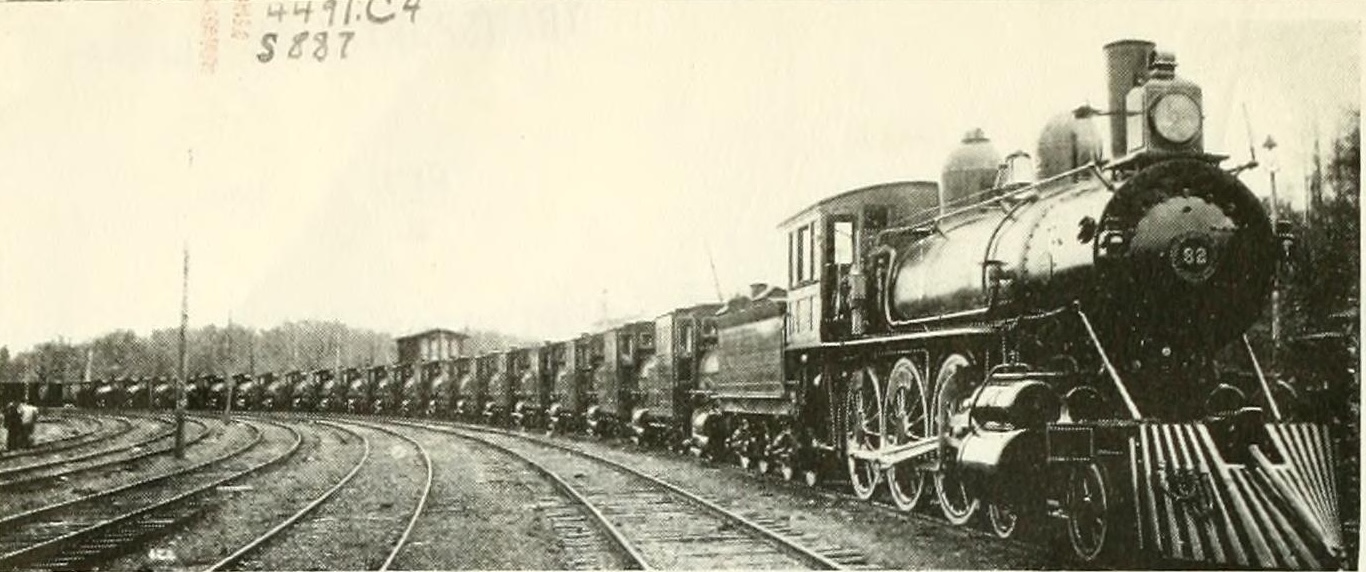
Delivery of the line's first 20 locomotives, 1892

Rolling stock on the line included 46 Forney-type (0-4-4T) steam locomotives that were built at the Baldwin Locomotive Works in Philadelphia, and 180 46-foot (14.02 m)-long wooden passenger cars. The first 20 locomotives were delivered coupled into a single train in April 1892.

The South Side Elevated railroad provided 24-hour service, a major advantage when compared to Chicago's cable railroads, which required daily overnight shutdown for cable maintenance. After midnight, two trains ran on the line, providing service every 20 minutes. In contrast, rush-hour service required 18 trains to maintain a schedule with a 3-minute headway.

== Bankruptcy and takeover ==
When the World's Columbian Exposition closed, lack of development along the southern portion of the route led to plummeting passenger numbers. The Chicago and South Side Rapid Transit Railroad Company went into receivership in 1895 and was sold under foreclosure in September 1896 for $4,100,100. The South Side Elevated Railroad was formed to take over the route in 1897.

Service was extended into the newly built Union Loop in October 1897 connecting the South Side Elevated Railroad with the Lake Street Elevated Railroad, the Metropolitan West Side Elevated Railroad, and (after 1900) the Northwestern Elevated Railroad.

These other companies used third rail electrification to power their trains, so the South Side Elevated Railroad enlisted Frank Julian Sprague to convert its rolling stock to electrical power. Sprague used his previously untested system of multiple-unit train control (MU), where multiple self-powered cars could be linked together and controlled by a single person, making the South Side Elevated Railroad the first in the world to use MU operation. MU-equipped electric operation began in April 1898, and the conversion was complete by July 27, 1898, when steam service was abandoned.

== Branches ==
As ridership increased, the South Side Elevated Railroad constructed additional branches. A 3-mile (4.8 km) branch to Englewood opened in stages between 1905 and 1907. The short 0.9-mile (1.4 km) Normal Park branch opened in 1907. Branches to Kenwood and the Union Stock Yards—both running on tracks owned by the Chicago Junction Railroad—opened in 1907 and 1908 respectively.

== Consolidation ==
In 1913, Chicago's four elevated railroad companies came together to form the Chicago Elevated Railways Collateral Trust establishing crosstown services for the first time. In 1924 all four companies were formally united to form the Chicago Rapid Transit Company. The Chicago Transit Authority took over the assets of the CRT in 1947. The Normal Park branch closed in 1954 and the Kenwood and Stock Yards branches were abandoned in 1957. Most of the rest of the route of the South Side Elevated Railroad continues in service as part of the CTA's Green Line.

== See also ==
- South Side Elevated
