= Stock Yards branch =

Segment of the Chicago "L" (1908–1957)

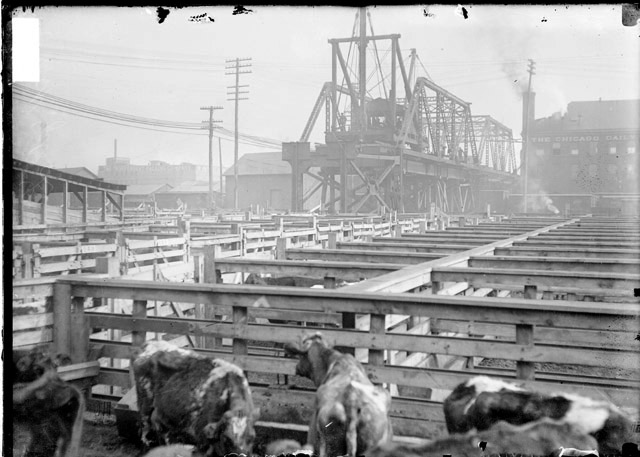
- Construction of the Stock Yards 'L'

Overview
- Status: Closed
- Locale: Chicago, Illinois, U.S.
- Termini: Indiana; Armour (last stop in terminal loop)
- Stations: 8

Service
- Type: Rapid transit
- System: Chicago 'L'
- Operator(s): Chicago Transit Authority (1947–1957); Chicago Rapid Transit Company (1924–1947); South Side Elevated Railroad (1908–1924)

History
- Opened: April 8, 1908
- Closed: October 6, 1957

Technical
- Line length: 2.9 mi (4.7 km)
- Character: Elevated
- Track gauge: 4 ft 8 1/2 in (1,435 mm) standard gauge
- Electrification: Third rail, 600 V DC

The Stock Yards branch was a rapid transit line which was part of the Chicago 'L' system from 1908 to 1957. The branch served the Union Stock Yards and the Canaryville neighborhood of Chicago and consisted of eight elevated stations. It opened on April 8, 1908, and closed on October 6, 1957.

== Operations ==
The Stock Yards branch was a 2.9-mile (4.7 km) elevated line which served eight stations. The branch began at the Indiana station, which was a transfer point for the South Side Elevated and Kenwood branch. It ran westward along two tracks to the Exchange station, before making a counterclockwise loop, serving the Union Stock Yards with stops at the Morris & Company packing plant at Racine Avenue, the Swift & Company packing plant, Packers Avenue, and the Armour and Company plant.

== History ==
The Stock Yards branch had its origins in the Union Stock Yards and Transit Company, a freight line built in 1864, which paralleled 40th Street between the Union Stock Yards and the Illinois Central Railroad. The freight line began passenger service in 1882. Passenger service along the line from the Stock Yards to Kenwood continued until 1904, and from the Stock Yards to the LaSalle Street Station downtown until 1908. In 1903, the Chicago City Council passed a measure requiring the 40th Street line be elevated as part of a larger effort to remove grade crossings from Chicago railroads; this meant that the South Side Elevated Railroad took over all operations from the Illinois Central, while the Chicago Junction Railroad owned the land and the structures. The Stock Yards "L" branch opened on April 8, 1908; not only was it a popular line for workers, but also for tourists.

In many ways, the line rose and fell with the fortunes of the Union Stock Yards: 50,000 workers worked in the yards, providing ample ridership for the branch. Conditions were extremely poor, and a 1934 fire in the Yard caused the shutdown of the line west of Halsted for six months while insurance disputes between the meat packers, the Junction Railroad and the Chicago Rapid Transit Company delayed repairs.

While the Union Stock Yards had been gradually declining before the Great Depression, the post-World War II era would lead to the Stock Yards and, by extension, the line's rapid decline. The Chicago Rapid Transit Company declared bankruptcy in 1947 and was taken over by the Chicago Transit Authority, which streamlined operations and cut unprofitable stations and routes out of the system; the rise of interstate trucking, refrigerated box cars, along with expensive property values in urban areas were slowly killing the Stock Yards; the line was extremely outdated (one of the last Elevated lines to use wooden cars from the early days of the "L") and sat on property and right of way loaned from the Junction Railroad, whose rental costs often exceeded revenue. The Wallace station was the first to close on May 3, 1952.

In 1956, another fire damaged Packers station; the loop was repaired a year later in April, however it was for naught as all service on the branch closed on October 6, 1957, due to extreme losses and declining ridership.

The CTA replaced the elevated train with the #43 bus line, which followed the same route into the Stock Yards; in a way, the line (at least the service and routing) would survive beyond the Stock Yards itself when the Yards closed in 1971, as the New City neighborhood went up on the former grounds of the now-demolished Stock Yards. As with most of the buildings that once existed in the Yards, there is no remaining structural evidence of the line's existence.

== Station listing ==
Stock Yard branch stations
Station	Location
Indiana	4003 S. Indiana Avenue
Wallace	Wallace Street and 40th Street
Halsted	Halsted Street and Root Street
Exchange	Exchange Avenue and Morgan Street
Racine (originally Morris)	Racine Avenue and Exchange Avenue (Morris & Company plant)
Swift	42nd Street and Packers Avenue (Swift & Company plant)
Packers	Packers Avenue and 44th Street
Armour	Racine Avenue and 43rd Street (Armour and Company plant)
