= Chicago Rapid Transit Company =

Defunct operator of the Chicago 'L'

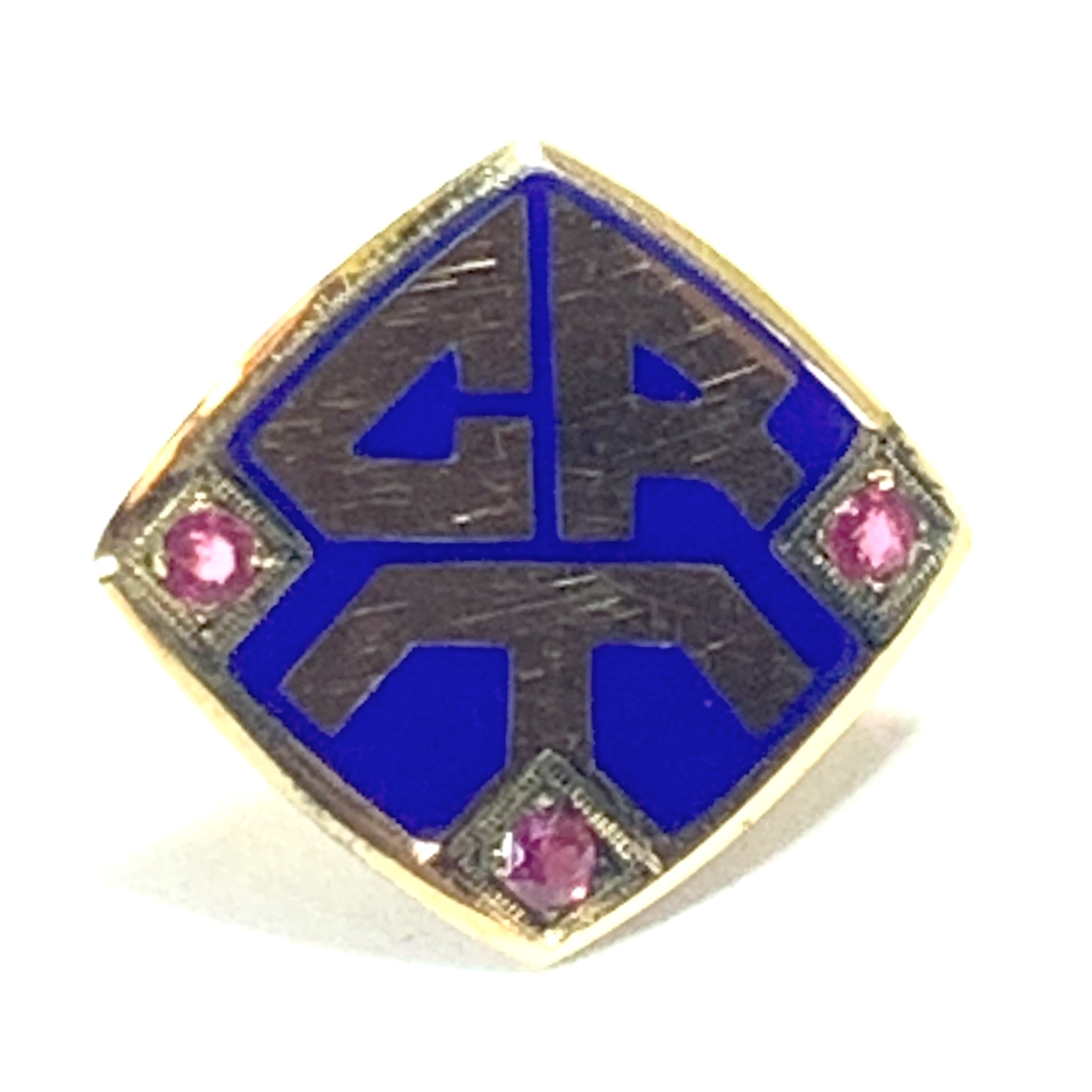
- A Chicago Rapid Transit (CRT) pin for employees

Overview
- Locale: Chicago, Illinois

Service
- Type: Rapid transit

History
- Opened: 1924; 102 years ago
- Closed: 1947; 79 years ago (merged into Chicago Transit Authority)

Technical
- Character: Elevated
- Track gauge: 4 ft 8 1/2 in (1,435 mm) standard gauge
- Electrification: Third rail, trolley wire 600 V DC

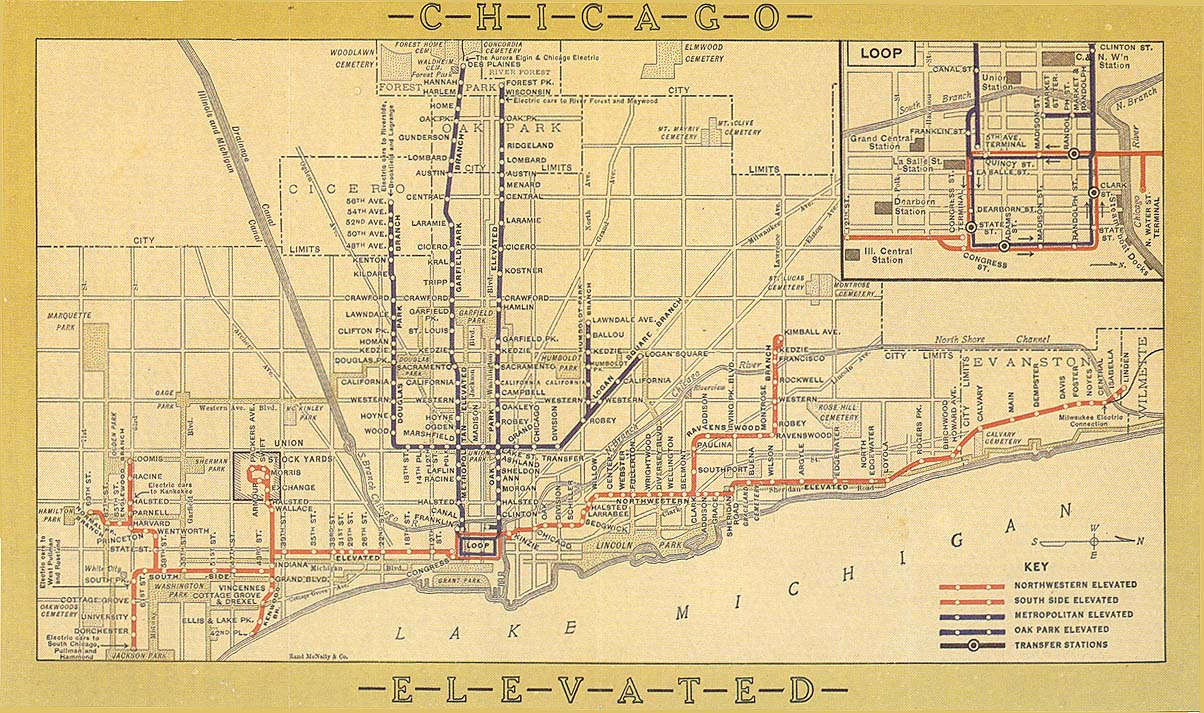

The Chicago Rapid Transit Company (CRT) was a privately owned firm providing rapid transit rail service in Chicago, Illinois, and several adjacent communities between 1924 and 1947. The CRT is one of the predecessors of the Chicago Transit Authority, Chicago's current mass transit operator.

== History ==
Leading up to the consolidation of the 'L' companies into the CRT was decades of the Chicago Elevated Railways Collateral Trust (CER), an entity directly attributed to utilities magnate Samuel Insull. The CER laid the groundwork for the companies to become one, including financial agreements and simplification that allowed for free transfers between the various lines at the places where they shared facilities, such as at Loop elevated stations. The CER also resulted in the through-routing of trains from one company's line to another, enabling riders to take a single train from Ravenswood on the Northwestern 'L' to 35th Street on the South Side 'L'.

The CRT was an amalgamation of several elevated railroad operators, each of which operated service in a particular section of the city. These predecessors include:

- Chicago and South Side Rapid Transit Railroad (providing service starting in 1892),
- Lake Street Elevated Railroad (providing service starting in 1893),
- Metropolitan West Side Elevated Railroad (providing service starting in 1895),
- Northwestern Elevated Railroad (providing service starting in 1900).

The CRT network was entirely at or above grade level until the 1943 opening of the State Street subway, now part of CTA's Red Line.

Following World War II and the continuing financial malaise of the privately owned bus, streetcar and elevated/subway operators, both the city government of Chicago and the Illinois legislature favored consolidating the three separate systems into a single, public-owned authority. The assets and operations of the CRT were assumed by the newly established Chicago Transit Authority on October 1, 1947.

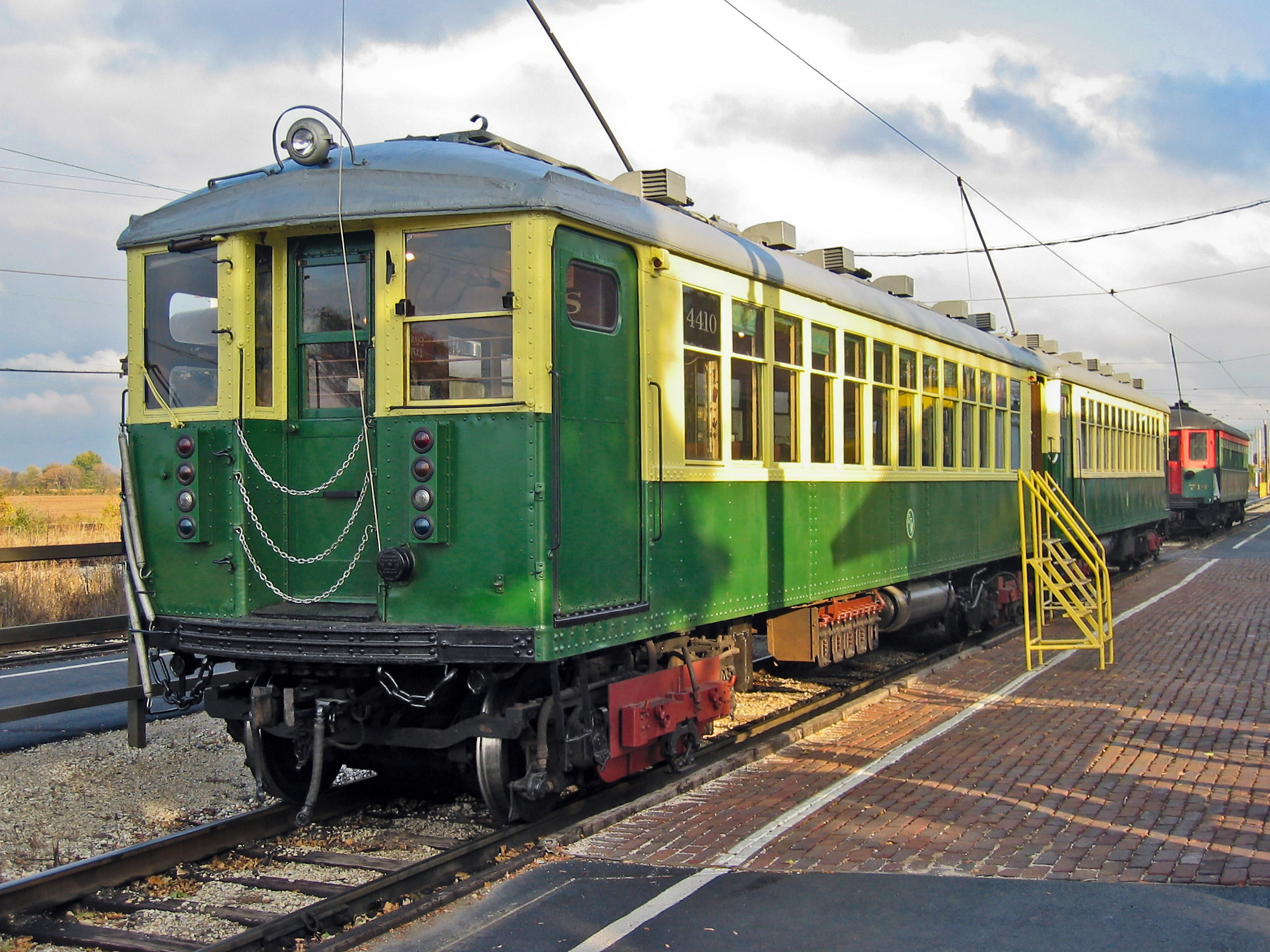
A 1922 vintage Chicago Rapid Transit Company "L" cars. This car had a trolley pole in addition to contact shoes on the trucks.
