= Damen station (CTA Green Line) =

Chicago "L" train station

Damen 2000W 200N
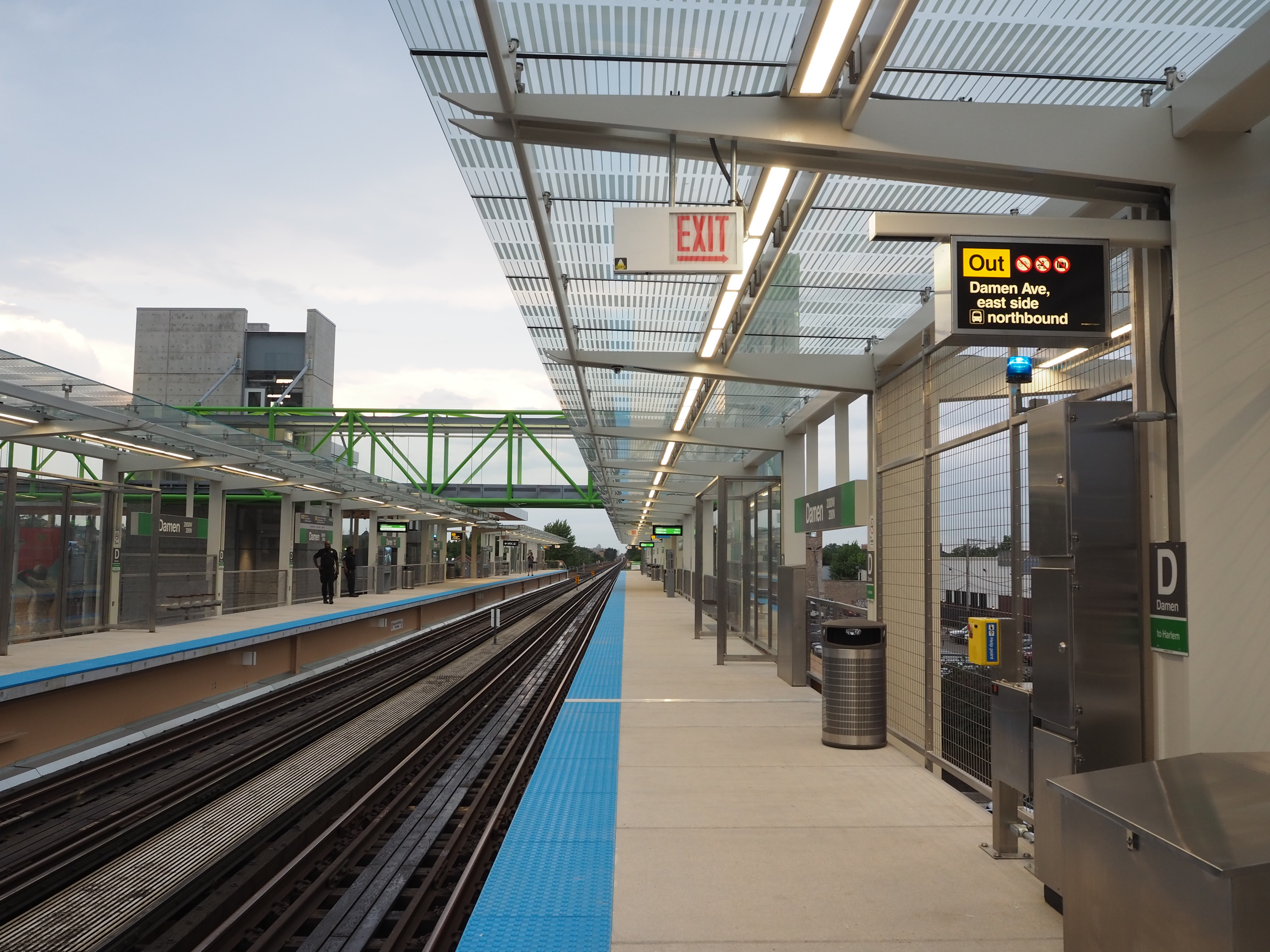
- Westbound platform on opening day in August 2024

General information
- Location: Damen Avenue and Lake Street; Chicago, Illinois
- Coordinates: 41°53′6″N 87°40′37″W
- Owner: Chicago Transit Authority
- Line: Lake Branch
- Platforms: 2 side platforms
- Tracks: 2 tracks

Construction
- Structure type: Elevated
- Accessible: Yes

History
- Opened: November 6, 1893
- Closed: April 4, 1948 – August 5, 2024
- Rebuilt: 2022–2024

Passengers
- 2024: 310,695 ▲179.4%

Services
| Preceding station | Chicago "L" | Following station |
|---|---|---|
| California toward Harlem/Lake | Green Line | Ashland toward Ashland/63rd or Cottage Grove |
Former services
| Preceding station | Chicago "L" | Following station |
|---|---|---|
| Oakley toward Forest Park | Lake Street Elevated | Wood Closed 1913 toward Loop (Randolph/Wells) or Market Terminal |
Track layout
Location

Damen is a rapid transit station on the Chicago "L"'s Green Line that opened on August 5, 2024. A station existed at this location from 1893 to 1948; opened as Robey in 1893, it was one of the original stations on what was then known as the Lake Street Elevated. The removal of the old station created a 1.5-mile (2.4 km) gap between the remaining stations. As the surrounding neighborhood saw an increase in new developments, the need for a replacement station grew. The station provides closer access to the United Center sports arena.

== History ==
=== Original station (1893–1948) ===
The Lake Street Elevated Railway Company was incorporated on February 7, 1888. Reincorpoated as the Lake Street Elevated Railroad Company on August 24, 1892, to avoid legal issues, its line, the Lake Street Elevated, commenced revenue operations at 5 a.m. on November 6, 1893, between California station and the Market Street Terminal. The new line had 13 stations, (Note: Including one at Homan, west of California, which had been a part of a non-revenue grand opening on November 4 but would not open for revenue service until November 24.) one of which was located on Robey Street; the street, originally named for politician James Robey, was renamed Damen Avenue for Father Arnold Damen in 1927. Originally powered by steam locomotives, the Elevated's tracks were electrified on May 9, 1896.

The Lake Street Elevated Railroad, having been dogged by financial issues since its inception, was reorganized as the Chicago and Oak Park Elevated Railroad (C&OP) on March 31, 1904. The C&OP, along with the other companies operating "L" lines in Chicago, became a part of the Chicago Elevated Railways (CER) trust on July 1, 1911. CER acted as a de facto holding company for the "L" – unifying its operations, instituting the same management across the companies, and instituting free transfers between the lines starting in 1913 – but kept the underlying companies intact. This continued until the companies were formally merged into the single Chicago Rapid Transit Company (CRT) in 1924, which assumed operations on January 9; the former C&OP would not join the CRT until it was bought out at an auction on January 31, and was designated the Lake Street Division of the CRT for administrative purposes. Although municipal ownership of transit had been a hotly-contested issue for half a century, the publicly-owned Chicago Transit Authority (CTA) would not be created until 1945, or assume operation of the "L" until October 1, 1947.

The newly created CTA closed the original Damen station alongside nine others on the Lake Street Elevated on April 4, 1948, due to their low ridership and in order to speed up service along the line. The closed stations were demolished in early 1949 and adaptively reused to make improvements to other "L" stations, including their wood and steel platform girders used to extend station platforms elsewhere. The station closures led to a gap between California and Lake Street Transfer in the area where Damen had been; after 1951, this became a gap between California and Ashland, which measured 1.5 miles (2.4 km) across.

=== New station (2024–present) ===
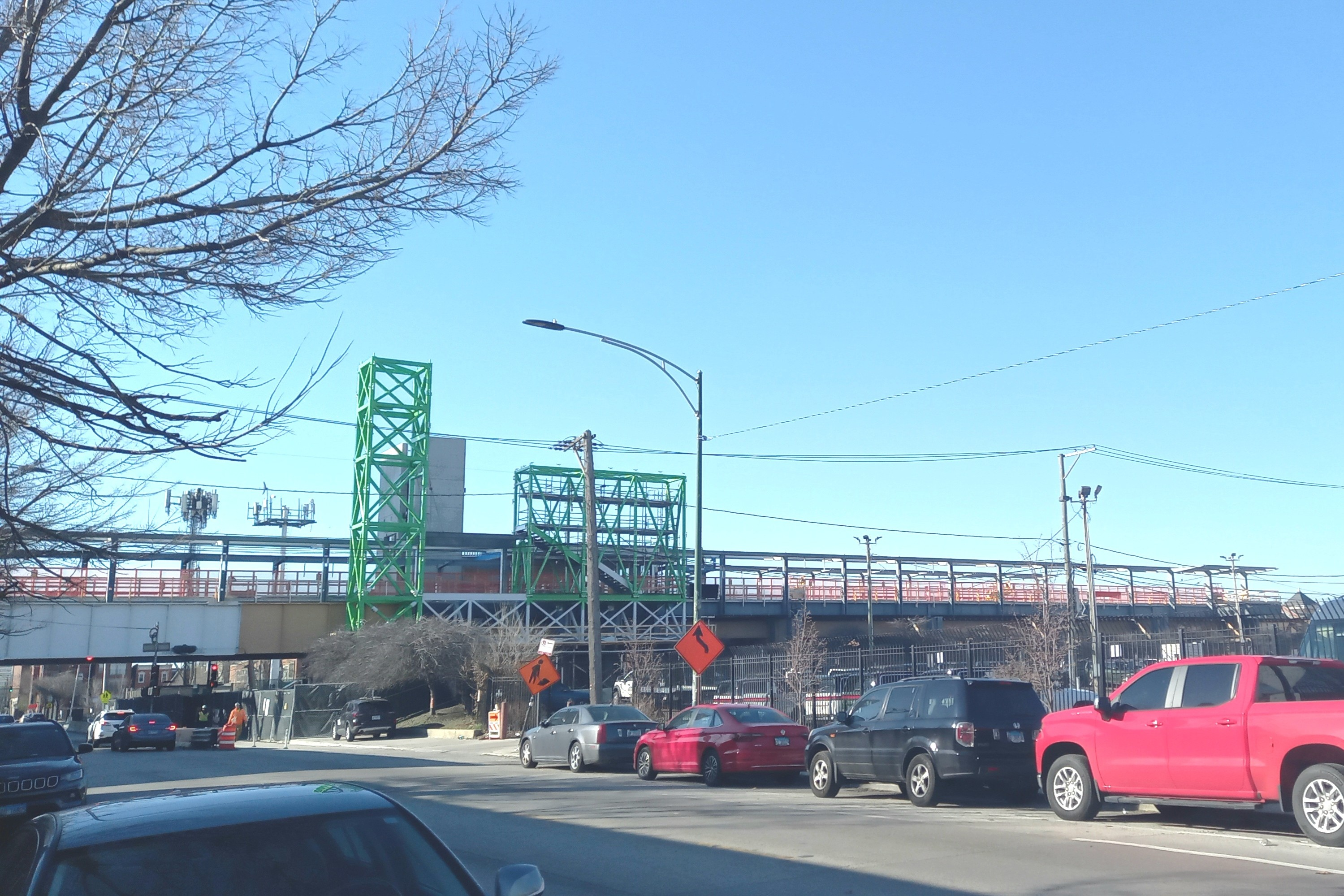
Station construction, as viewed from Damen Avenue

The CTA conducted a study in 2002 to investigate the possibility of "infill stations" on the Green Line to fill station gaps that were wider than normal. Morgan, another Lake Street station closed in 1948, had been floated for revival since the 1990s and was discussed in the study, opening in 2012 and filling a 1.3-mile (2.1 km) gap between Ashland and Clinton. Another infill station discussed by the study, Cermak–McCormick Place station, was completed in 2015. Both stations spurred significant economic growth in their respective neighborhoods.

The new Damen station was announced on February 9, 2017, marking the third new CTA station announced during Rahm Emanuel's tenure as Mayor of Chicago. At the time of the announcement, design and engineering was planned to commence in 2017, construction of the new station was expected to begin in spring 2019 and be completed in 2020. Groundbreaking of the new station began in May 2019, with construction of the new station expected to begin in late 2019 and be completed in 2021. It will fill the 1.5-mile (2.4 km) distance between the California and Ashland stations on the Green line. It will become the closest "L" station to the United Center, with public transportation service to an emerging business corridor and residential neighborhood. At the time of the announcement, the estimate cost was $50 million, but no designs for the station were announced. State and federal agencies were being lobbied for funding for the station by 27th ward alderman Walter Burnett Jr. although tax increment financing (TIF) was planned if no other funding is received.

On April 25, 2018, the city began the Lake Street reconstruction project, which includes Damen station.

After years of delay caused by supply chain issues, which hampered utility relocation, a building permit for the new Damen station was issued on August 12, 2022. Construction on the station was expected to last 18 months; however, further delays during construction pushed the station's opening by a few more months. The station opened on Monday, August 5, 2024, in preparation for the 2024 Democratic National Convention in the United Center.

== Station details ==
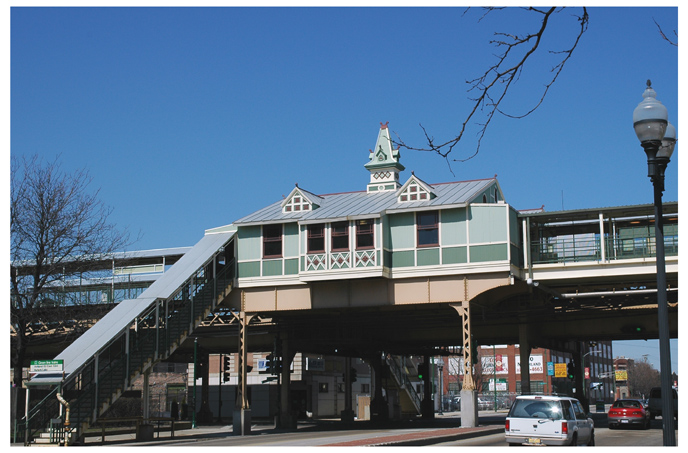
One of Ashland's station houses in April 2005. The original Damen station was of a similar design, but had staircases on both sides of the station house.

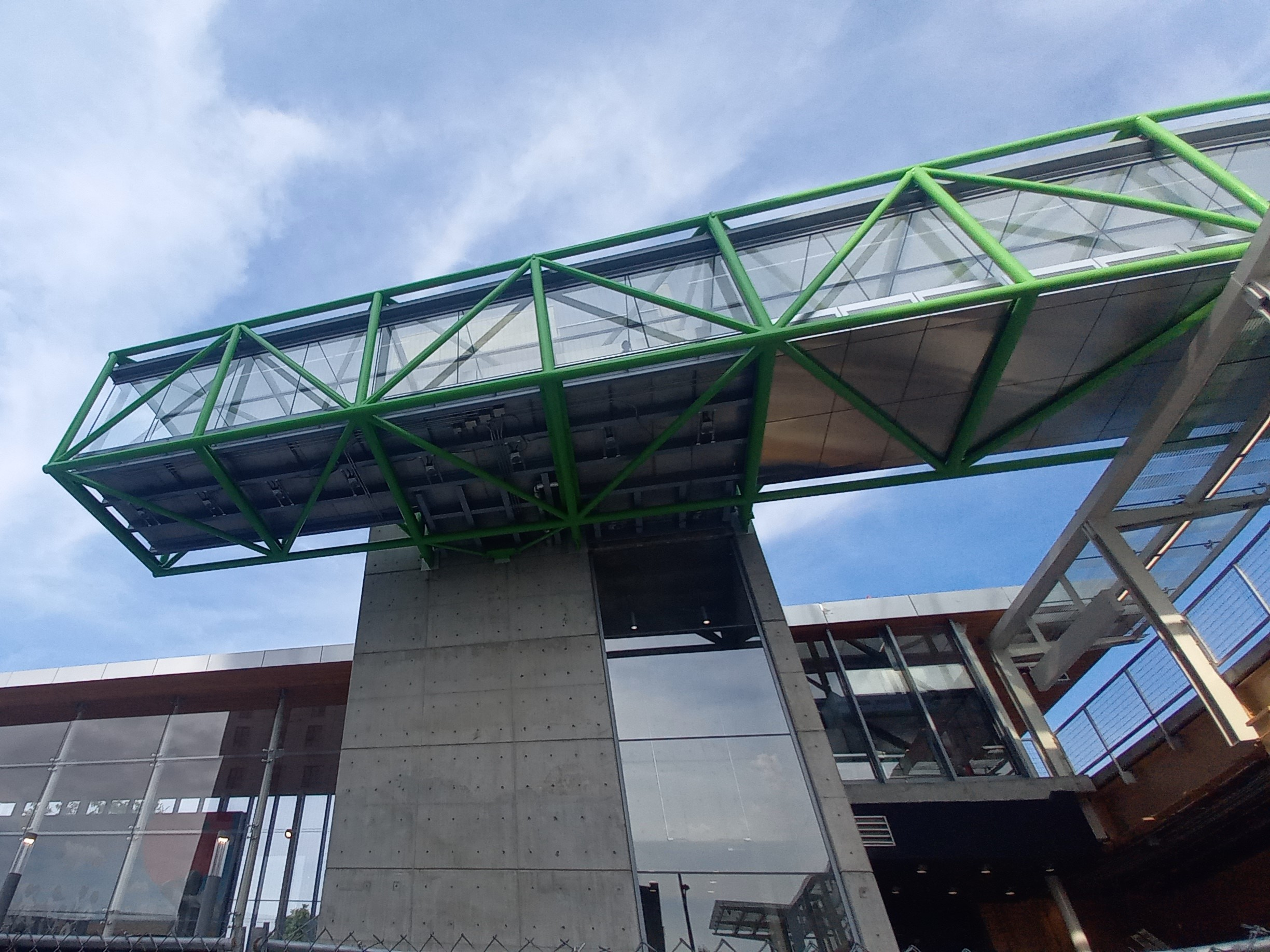
The station house and the skybridge at the new Damen station, photographed a day before opening

=== Original station ===
The original Damen station had two station houses, one on each platform, designed in a "gingerbread" Queen Anne style, similar to the other stations on the route and the surviving station houses at Ashland. The station houses were heated by potbelly stoves, and while earlier plans had called for their ticket agent's booths to be placed on the sides of the station houses facing the street, they ended up being placed in alcoves adjacent to the platforms. The construction of the Lake Street Elevated's stations was contracted to Frank L. Underwood of Kansas City and Willard R. Green of New York, who subcontracted to the Lloyd and Pennington Company.

=== New station ===
On July 9, 2018, the design for the new station was revealed. A glass-covered pedestrian bridge enables foot traffic between the inbound and outbound platforms, and provide a view of the city's skyline. The station was designed by the architecture firm Perkins and Will and structural engineering firm Simpson Gumpertz & Heger.

=== Ridership ===
The original Damen station's ridership peaked at 496,839 passengers in 1905, and last exceeded 400,000 riders in 1906. Ridership held steady for a decade afterwards, but last exceeded 300,000 passengers in 1920, 200,000 passengers in 1927, and 100,000 in 1931 before the late 1940s, bottoming out at 80,161 in 1938. In its last full year of operation, 1947, Damen served 106,902 riders, a 3.91 percent decrease from the 111,248 riders in 1946. For the part of 1948 it was open, Damen served 30,262 passengers. While in 1947 it had been the Lake Street's tenth-lowest ridership station, in early 1948 it declined to be its fifth-least patronized station, after the overflow-use Randolph/Market station downtown, Campbell and Oakley immediately to Damen's west, and Racine, all of which also closed on April 4. In 1947, it was the 208th-most ridden of the 222 "L" stations where ridership was recorded, and during early 1948 was the 218th-busiest of 223 such stations. (Note: Several stations on the Niles Center and Westchester branches were permanently unstaffed and thus did not collect ridership statistics. Exchange station on the Stock Yards branch lacked statistics for 1947 but returned in 1948.)

== Bus connections ==
CTA

- 50 Damen

== Works cited ==
- CTA Rail Entrance, Annual Traffic, 1900–1979 (Report). Chicago: Chicago Transit Authority. October 1, 1979.
- Moffat, Bruce G. (1995). The "L": The Development of Chicago's Rapid Transit System, 1888–1932. Chicago: Central Electric Railfans' Association. ISBN 0-915348-30-6.
