= Loomis station (CTA Lake Street Elevated) =

Former station on the Chicago "L"

LOOMIS 1400W 200N

General information
- Location: Loomis Street and Lake Street; Chicago, Illinois
- Coordinates: 41.885439°N 87.662670°W
- Owner: Chicago Transit Authority
- Line: Lake Street Elevated
- Platforms: 2 side platforms
- Tracks: 2 tracks

Construction
- Structure type: Elevated

History
- Opened: November 6, 1893; March 5, 1951
- Closed: February 25, 1951; April 4, 1954
- Former names: Sheldon Street; Loomis & Ogden

Former services
| Preceding station | Chicago "L" | Following station |
|---|---|---|
| Ashland toward Forest Park | Lake Street Elevated | Racine Closed 1948 toward Loop (Randolph/Wells) or Market Terminal |
Location

Loomis was a rapid transit station on the Chicago Transit Authority Lake Street Elevated, which is now part of the Green Line. The station was located at the intersection of Lake Street, Loomis Street, and Ogden Avenue in the Near West Side neighborhood. Loomis opened on November 6, 1893, and closed on April 4, 1954.

== History ==
The Lake Street Elevated Railway Company was incorporated on February 7, 1888. Reincorporated as the Lake Street Elevated Railroad Company on August 24, 1892, to avoid legal issues, its line, the Lake Street Elevated, commenced revenue operations at 5 a.m. on November 6, 1893, between California station and the Market Street Terminal. The new line had 13 stations, (Note: Including one at Homan, west of California, which had been a part of a non-revenue grand opening on November 4 but would not open for revenue service until November 24.) one of which was located on Sheldon Street. The Elevated was powered by steam locomotives until May 9, 1896, when its tracks were electrified. The Lake Street Elevated Railroad, having been dogged by financial issues since its inception, was reorganized as the Chicago and Oak Park Elevated Railroad (C&OP) on March 31, 1904.

Sheldon Street was renamed "Loomis Street" after the station opened, and so was the station. The station closed on February 25, 1951, so that Ashland could reopen now that the Lake Street Transfer was unnecessary, but local pressure caused it to reopen several days later on March 5. The station closed again for good on April 4, 1954, after an auxiliary exit to Ashland was opened near the site.

== Station details ==
=== Ridership ===
In 1948, Loomis served 79,158 passengers, a 7.07 percent increase from the 73,931 served in 1947. Its 1948 performance made it the 206th-busiest of the "L"'s 223 stations at the beginning of the year that were at least partially staffed, whereas in 1947 it had been the 215th-busiest of 222 such stations. (Note: Several stations on the Niles Center and Westchester branches were permanently unstaffed and thus did not collect ridership statistics. Several stations closed on the "L" during 1948. Exchange station on the Stock Yards branch discontinued statistics after 1946, but adjacent Racine station began collecting them in 1948.)

== Works cited ==
- CTA Rail Entrance, Annual Traffic, 1900–1979 (Report). Chicago: Chicago Transit Authority. October 1, 1979.
- Moffat, Bruce G. (1995). The "L": The Development of Chicago's Rapid Transit System, 1888–1932. Chicago: Central Electric Railfans' Association. ISBN 0-915348-30-6.
