= Oak Park station (CTA Green Line) =

Chicago "L" station

Oak Park 800W 100S
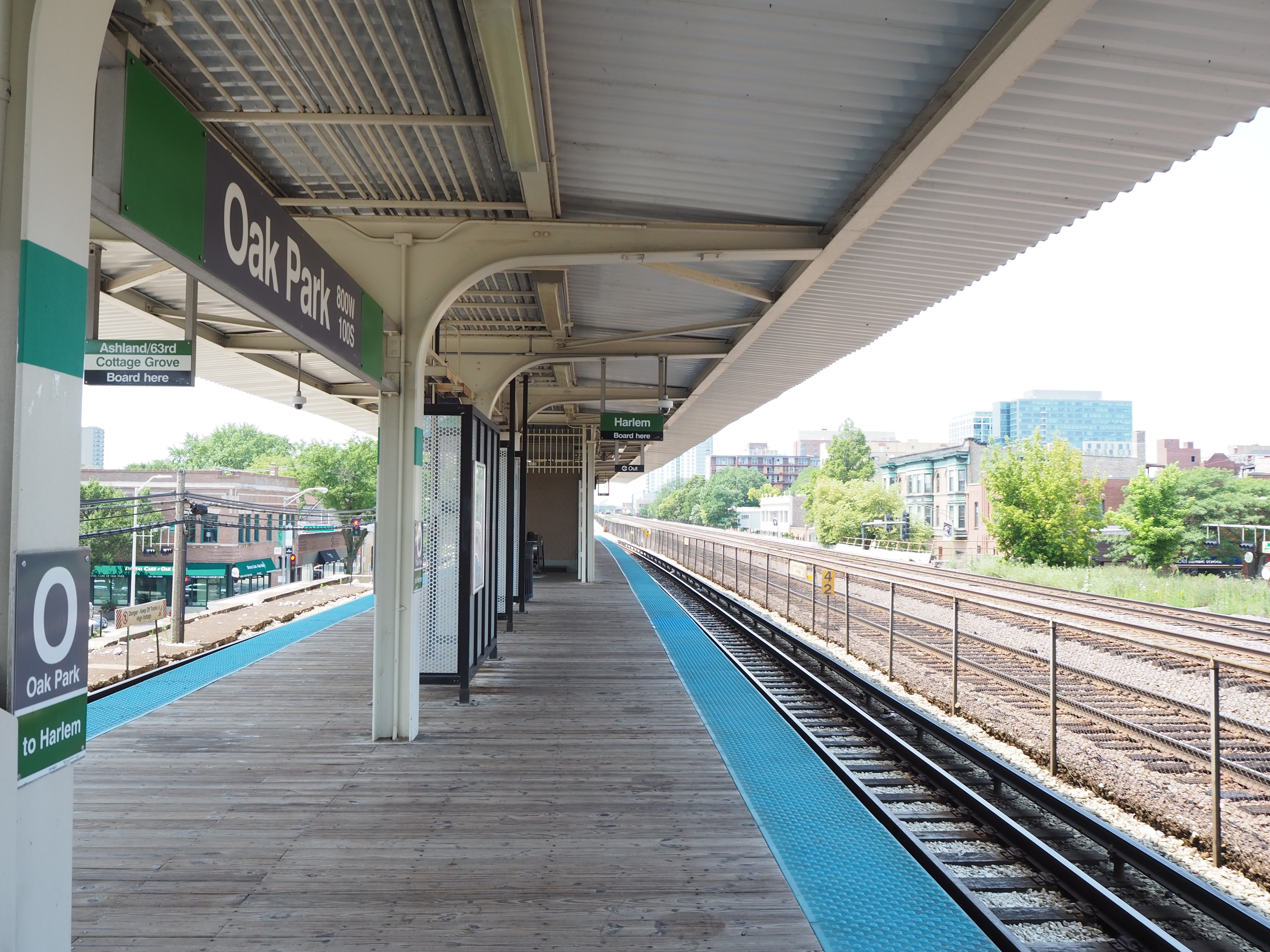

General information
- Location: 100 South Oak Park Avenue; Oak Park, Illinois 60302
- Coordinates: 41.886784°N 87.794323°W
- Line: Lake Branch
- Platforms: 1 island platform
- Tracks: 2

Construction
- Structure type: Embankment
- Accessible: No

History
- Opened: January 25, 1901
- Rebuilt: October 28, 1962

Passengers
- 2025: 269,763 ▲10.6%

Services
| Preceding station | Chicago "L" | Following station |
|---|---|---|
| Harlem/Lake Terminus | Green Line | Ridgeland toward Ashland/63rd or Cottage Grove |
Former services
| Preceding station | Chicago and North Western Railway | Following station |
|---|---|---|
| Marion Street toward Geneva | Galena Division | Ridgeland toward Chicago |
| Preceding station | Chicago "L" | Following station |
| Marion Closed 1962 toward Forest Park | Lake Street Elevated | Ridgeland toward Loop (Randolph/Wells) or Market Terminal |
Track layout
Location

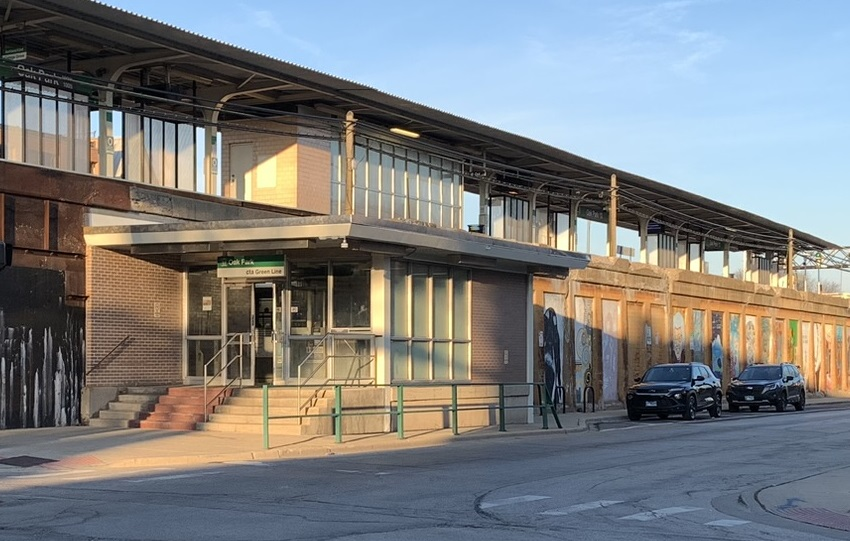
The Oak Park station house in 2024

Oak Park is a station on the Chicago Transit Authority's 'L' system situated between the Ridgeland and Harlem stations on the Green Line. It is located at Oak Park Avenue and South Boulevard in the village of Oak Park, Illinois and is the closest station to the Frank Lloyd Wright Home and Studio.

== History ==
Oak Park station was opened on January 25, 1901, by the Lake Street Elevated Railroad as a surface-level station on the line that ran parallel to the former Chicago and Northwestern Railway line (today's Union Pacific West Line). Both lines created an unsafe grade crossing, especially as the community moved from horse-powered vehicles to the automobile. When the C&NW elevated its line between 1908 and 1909, it created a blind spot for traffic trying to cross the Lake Street Line.

On October 28, 1962, the station was elevated on an embankment and the main entrance was rebuilt by taking advantage of the small space along the road to include a ticket window and enclosed waiting rooms. When the Green Line closed for a renovation project in 1994, the CTA had planned to permanently close the Oak Park station along with four other stations (Austin, Laramie, Homan and Halsted). However, due to political pressure and complaints from local residents, the station was retained rather than rebuilt and reopened with the Green Line on May 12, 1996. Upon reopening, a committee of Oak Park residents with disabilities strongly protested, noting that it remained one of the few Green Line stations not accessible to people with disabilities.

== Bus connections ==
Pace

- 309 Lake Street
- 311 Oak Park Avenue
- 313 St. Charles Road
