= Ashland station (CTA Green and Pink Lines) =

Chicago "L" station

Ashland 1600W 200N
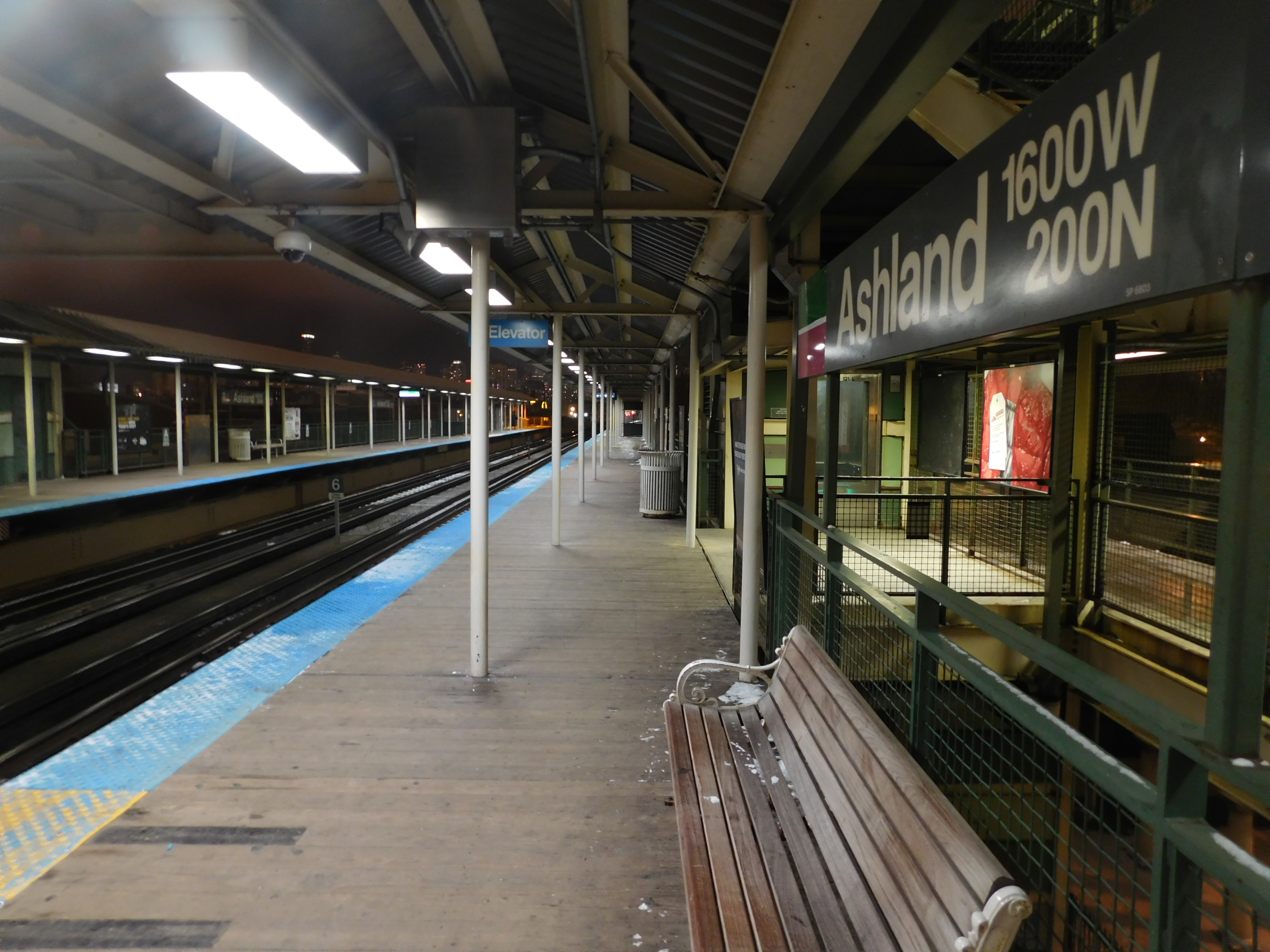

General information
- Location: 1601 West Lake Street; Chicago, Illinois 60612
- Coordinates: 41°53′07″N 87°40′01″W
- Owner: Chicago Transit Authority
- Line: Lake Branch
- Platforms: 2 side platforms
- Tracks: 2

Construction
- Structure type: Elevated
- Accessible: Yes

History
- Opened: November 6, 1893; 132 years ago
- Closed: April 4, 1948; 78 years ago – February 25, 1951; 75 years ago
- Rebuilt: 1996; 30 years ago

Passengers
- 2025: 578,568 ▼7.9%

Services
Preceding station	Chicago "L"	Following station
Damen toward Harlem/Lake	Green Line	Morgan toward Ashland/63rd or Cottage Grove
Polk toward 54th/Cermak	Pink Line	Morgan toward Loop (Clark/Lake)
Former services
Preceding station	Chicago "L"	Following station
Lake Street Transfer Closed 1951 toward Forest Park	Lake Street Elevated	Loomis Closed 1954 toward Loop (Randolph/Wells) or Market Terminal
Track layout
Location

Ashland is an 'L' station on the CTA's Green and Pink Lines. It is an elevated station with two side platforms, located in Chicago's Near West Side neighborhood at 1601 West Lake Street. Just to the west of the station, the Pink Line branches off from the Lake Street branch to follow the Paulina Connector to the Douglas branch. The adjacent stations are Damen (Green), which is located about 1/2 mile (0.80 km) to the west, Polk (Pink), which is located about 1 mile (1.6 km) to the south, and Morgan station, approximately 3/4 mile (1.2 km) to the east.

== History ==
Ashland station opened on November 6, 1893, as part of the Lake Street Elevated Railroad's initial route, and it is one of the oldest standing stations on the 'L'. The station closed on April 4, 1948, along with nine other stations on the Lake Street branch, but later reopened on February 25, 1951, the same day the Milwaukee-Dearborn subway opened for service. During the two-year closure of the Green Line from 1994 to 1996, the station was restored and elevators were added to make the station accessible to passengers with disabilities.

== Structure and location ==
Ashland is directly adjacent to Union Park, venue for the Intonation Music Festival and the Pitchfork Music Festival. Prior to the opening of the Damen station in 2024, Ashland was also the closest "L" station to the United Center, the home stadium of the Chicago Bulls (NBA) and the Chicago Blackhawks (NHL).

== Bus connections ==
CTA

- 9 Ashland (Owl Service)
- X9 Ashland Express (weekday rush hours only)

== See also ==
- Ashland (CTA Orange Line station)
- Ashland/63rd (CTA station)
