= Campbell station =

Former Chicago "L" station

CAMPBELL 2500W 200N

General information
- Coordinates: 41.88453°N 87.68876°W

Construction
- Structure type: Elevated

History
- Opened: November 6, 1893
- Closed: April 4, 1948

Former services
Preceding station	Chicago "L"	Following station
California Closed 1948 toward Forest Park	Lake Street Elevated	Oakley toward Loop (Randolph/Wells) or Market Terminal
Location

Campbell was a rapid transit station on the Chicago "L"'s Lake Street Elevated from 1893 to 1948.

== History ==
The station opened in 1893 and closed in 1948.

=== Accidents and incidents ===
On the night of June 28, 1910, a train derailed while repair work was done to the tracks, affecting trains in both directions and causing delays of up to an hour. Passengers walked several hundred yards across the structure to the Campbell station. On the same night, a streetcar on Lake Street collided with a mail car and derailed, also delaying traffic. No injuries resulted from either accident.

== Station details ==
=== Ridership ===
Ridership at Campbell peaked at 244,570 passengers in 1901, and last exceeded 200,000 in 1903. By 1914, it was the least-ridden station on the Lake Street Elevated except for the Randolph/Market station downtown, which was only used during rush hours, and the Lake Street's portion of Lake Street Transfer. (Note: That Transfer involved both the Lake Street and Metropolitan Elevateds, whose combined ridership beat that of Campbell throughout the 1910s.) In 1921, its ridership became even lower than that of the Lake Street's contribution to the Transfer, and except for 1926 would never exceed 100,000 passengers after that year. Ridership last exceeded 50,000 in 1930, and bottomed out at 31,440 in 1944. In its last full year of operation, 1947, it served 38,878 passengers, while for the part of 1948 it was open it served 11,609. Behind Randolph/Market, it was the lowest-ridership station at least partially staffed on the entire Chicago "L" in 1947 and early 1948. (Note: Several stations on the Niles Center and Westchester branches had stations that were permanently unstaffed, depriving those stations ridership statistics.)

== Works cited ==
- CTA Rail Entrance, Annual Traffic, 1900–1979 (Report). Chicago: Chicago Transit Authority. October 1, 1979.
