= Halsted station (CTA Green Line Lake branch) =

Halsted 800W 200N
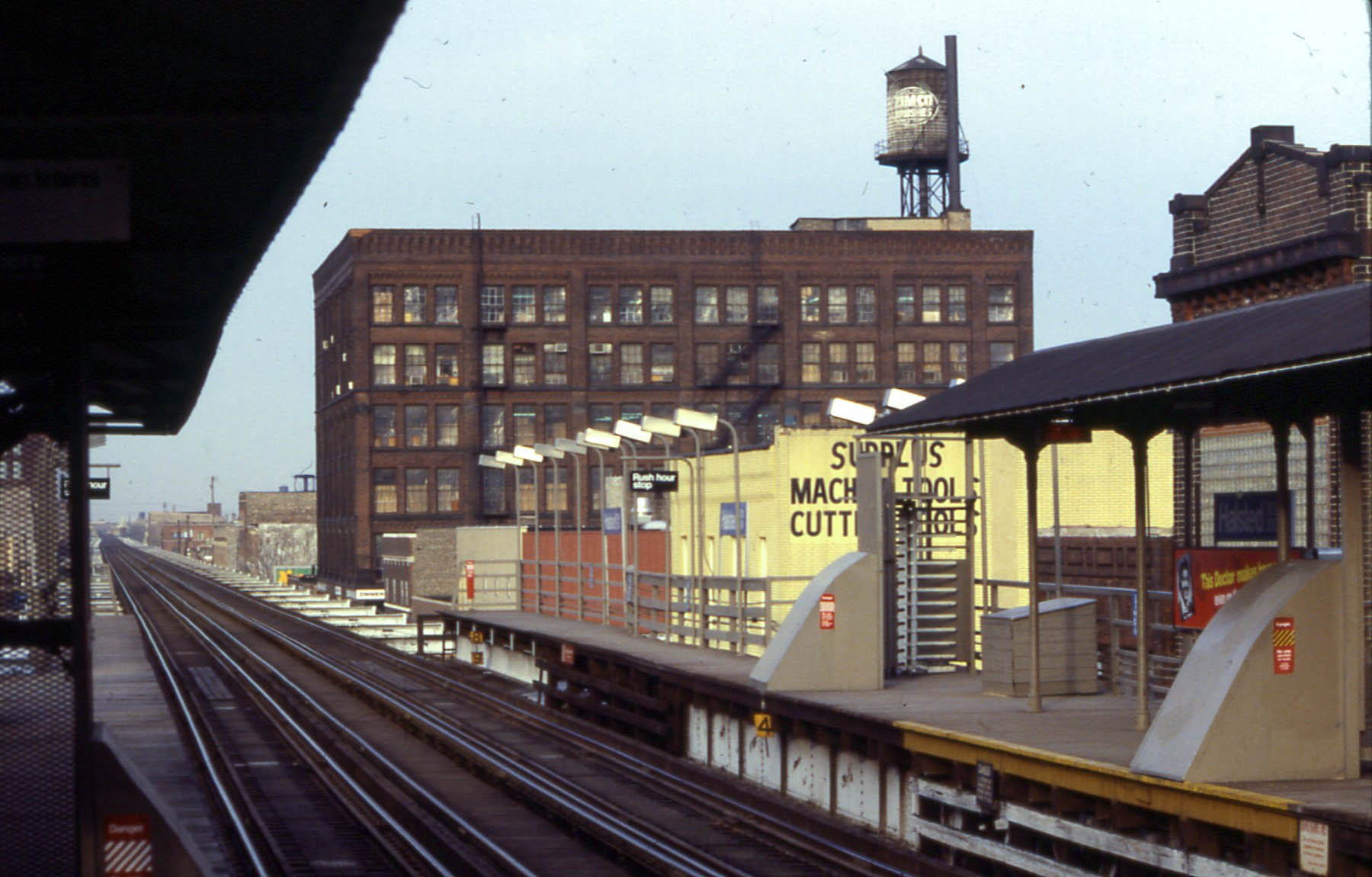
- Halsted station in 1987

General information
- Location: 800 W. Lake Street; Chicago, Illinois
- Coordinates: 41.88566°N 87.64748°W
- Owner: Chicago Transit Authority
- Line: Lake Branch
- Platforms: 2 side platforms
- Tracks: 2

Construction
- Structure type: Elevated

History
- Opened: November 6, 1893
- Closed: January 9, 1994

Former services
Preceding station	Chicago "L"	Following station
Closed as part of the Green Line (from 1993)
Morgan Closed 1948 (Reopened) toward Harlem/Lake	Lake Street Elevated	Clinton toward Loop (Randolph/Wells) or Market Terminal
Location

Halsted was a station on the Chicago Transit Authority's Green Line in the Near West Side neighborhood of Chicago, Illinois. Halsted opened on November 6, 1893, and closed on January 9, 1994, when the entire Green Line closed for a renovation project. The station did not reopen with the rest of the Green Line on May 12, 1996, due to service cuts, and the station was demolished shortly after the Green Line reopened.
