= Morgan station =

Chicago "L" station

Morgan 1000W 200N
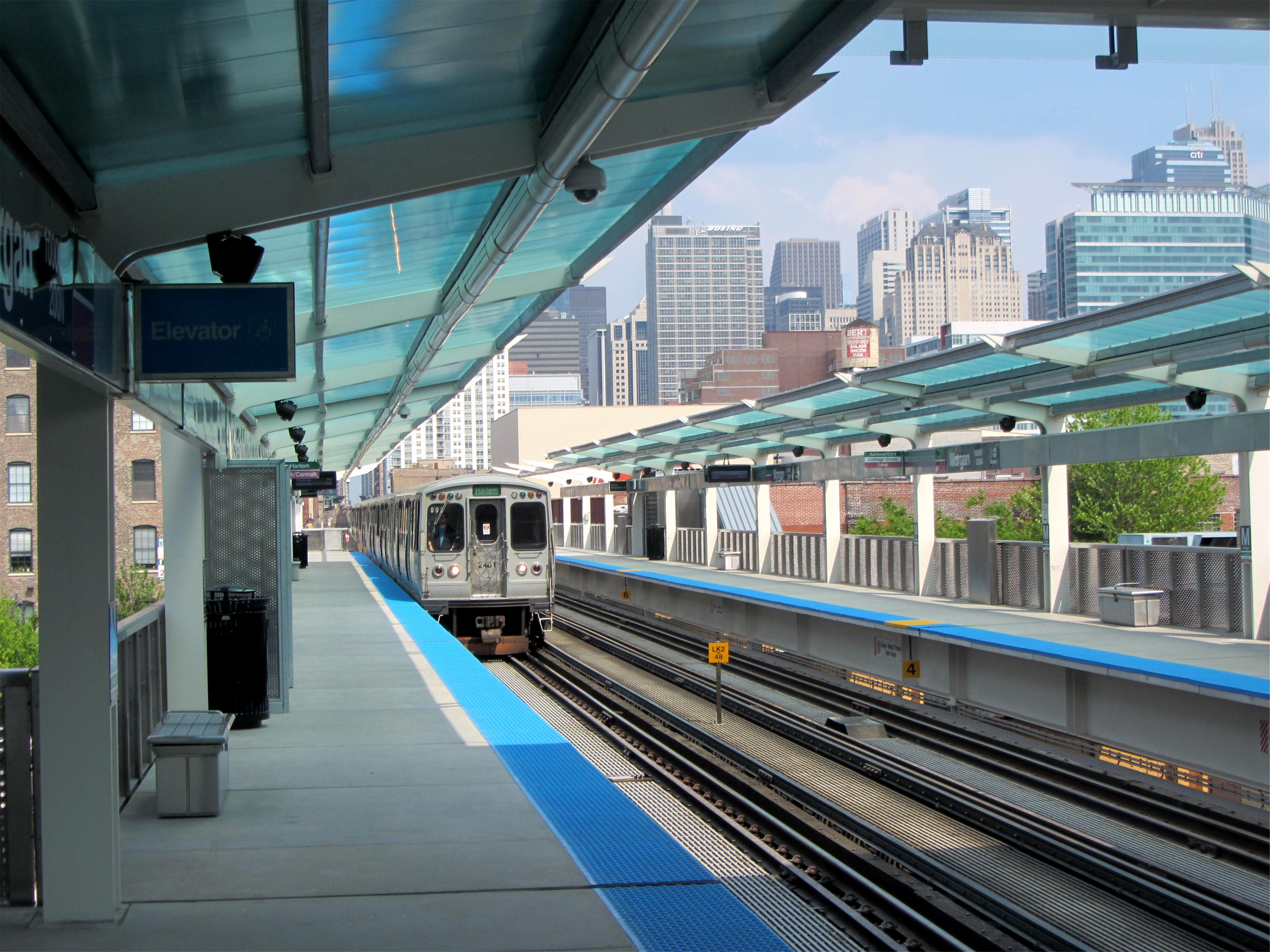

General information
- Location: 958 West Lake Street; Chicago, Illinois 60607
- Coordinates: 41.8856°N 87.6522°W
- Owner: Chicago Transit Authority (1947–present); CRT (1924–1947); See text before 1924
- Line: Lake Branch
- Platforms: 2 side platforms
- Tracks: 2

Construction
- Structure type: Elevated
- Cycle facilities: Yes
- Accessible: Yes

History
- Opened: November 6, 1893; 133 years ago May 18, 2012; 14 years ago
- Closed: April 4, 1948 – May 18, 2012
- Rebuilt: August 26, 2010 – May 18, 2012
- Electrified: May 9, 1896; 130 years ago

Passengers
- 2025: 1,305,911 ▲18%

Services
| Preceding station | Chicago "L" | Following station |
|---|---|---|
| Ashland toward Harlem/Lake | Green Line | Clinton toward Ashland/63rd or Cottage Grove |
| Ashland toward 54th/Cermak | Pink Line | Clinton toward Loop (Clark/Lake) |
Former services
| Preceding station | Chicago "L" | Following station |
|---|---|---|
| Racine toward Forest Park | Lake Street Elevated | Halsted toward Loop (Randolph/Wells) or Market Terminal |
Track layout
Location

Morgan is a rapid transit station on the Chicago "L"'s Green and Pink Lines in Chicago's Near West Side neighborhood. The current station opened at this location in 2012, where a previous station stood from 1893 to 1949.

The original station on this site opened with the Lake Street Elevated in November 1893 and closed due to low ridership in April 1948 before being demolished early the following year. For the rest of the 20th century, the nearby Halsted station served the community before it too closed in 1994, leaving a sizeable gap between Clinton and Ashland.

After years of intense lobbying by local residents and members of the Fulton Market Merchant Association, the Chicago Department of Transportation rebuilt the station from 2010–2012. The new station opened on May 18, 2012.

== History ==
=== Original station (1893–1948) ===
The Lake Street Elevated Railway Company was incorporated on February 7, 1888. Reincorpoated as the Lake Street Elevated Railroad Company on August 24, 1892, to avoid legal issues, its line, the Lake Street Elevated, commenced revenue operations at 5 a.m. on November 6, 1893, between California station and the Market Street Terminal. The new line had 13 stations, (Note: Including one at Homan, west of California, which had been a part of a non-revenue grand opening on November 4 but would not open for revenue service until November 24.) one of which was located on Morgan Street. Originally powered by steam locomotives, the Elevated's tracks were electrified on May 9, 1896.

The Lake Street Elevated Railroad, having been dogged by financial issues since its inception, was reorganized as the Chicago and Oak Park Elevated Railroad (C&OP) on March 31, 1904. The C&OP, along with the other companies operating "L" lines in Chicago, became a part of the Chicago Elevated Railways (CER) trust on July 1, 1911. CER acted as a de facto holding company for the "L" – unifying its operations, instituting the same management across the companies, and instituting free transfers between the lines starting in 1913 – but kept the underlying companies intact. This continued until the companies were formally merged into the single Chicago Rapid Transit Company (CRT) in 1924, which assumed operations on January 9; the former C&OP would not join the CRT until it was bought out at an auction on January 31, and was designated the Lake Street division of the CRT for administrative purposes. Although municipal ownership of transit had been a hotly-contested issue for half a century, the publicly-owned Chicago Transit Authority (CTA) would not be created until 1945, or assume operation of the "L" until October 1, 1947.

The newly created CTA closed the original Morgan station alongside nine others on the Lake Street Elevated on April 4, 1948, due to their low ridership and to speed up service along the line. The closed stations were demolished in early 1949 and adaptively reused to make improvements to other "L" stations, including their wood and steel platform girders used to extend station platforms elsewhere. The neighborhood continued to be served by Halsted two blocks east.

=== Closure of Halsted and gap in service (1994–2012) ===
Halsted continued to serve the neighborhood until January 9, 1994, when the CTA closed the Green Line for a renovation project. This project included the permanent closure of six stations, and among them was the Halsted station. With the closure of Halsted, no Green Line stations remained in the West Loop or Fulton Market areas, leaving a gap of 1.3 miles (2.1 km) between the Ashland and Clinton stations. The closure of Halsted was unpopular, and since that date, community residents, businesses, and local organizations have argued that this area needs a new "infill station" to restore rail service. Heightening the need for a new station, significant amounts of growth have occurred near the line in the last 15 years, including large residential buildings and many popular restaurants and nightclubs.

=== New station (2012–present) ===
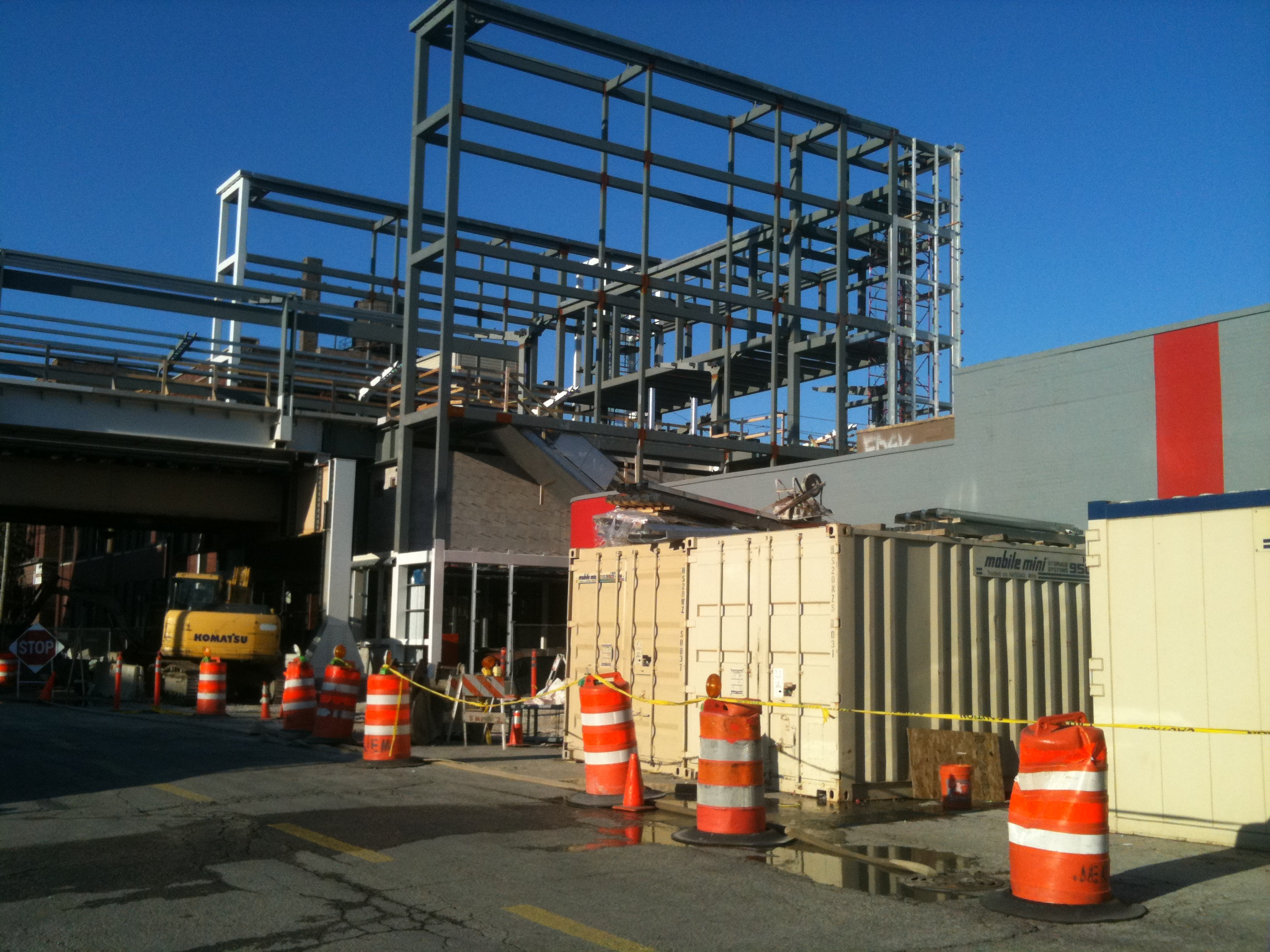
View of the new station under construction, looking North on Morgan Street

Morgan was a logical location for a new station, as it is located halfway between Ashland and Clinton, and the intersection of Morgan/Lake is close to much of the new development in the area. It also sits near many art galleries that have opened recently, as well as Oprah Winfrey's Harpo Studios, a major tourist attraction. In the early 2000s, the CTA began to work with local groups and city officials to plan and identify funding sources for the new station. Initially, the neighborhood planned to cover the entire cost with funding from a local tax increment financing district. Later, however, the Chicago Department of Transportation decided to seek federal Congestion Mitigation and Air Quality Improvement (CMAQ) Program funding to cover $8 million of the cost, allowing some of the TIF money to be used for other purposes. The final cost of building the station was $38 million.

Construction began in Summer 2010. TranSystems led the design team, in conjunction with Ross Barney Architects. Like most currently active Green Line and Pink Line stations, Morgan is accessible to passengers with disabilities, with an elevator on either side of the tracks. The station will also have bike storage.

The new Morgan station officially opened on May 18, 2012, and grand opening ceremonies were held on May 24.

== Station details ==
=== Original station (1893–1948) ===
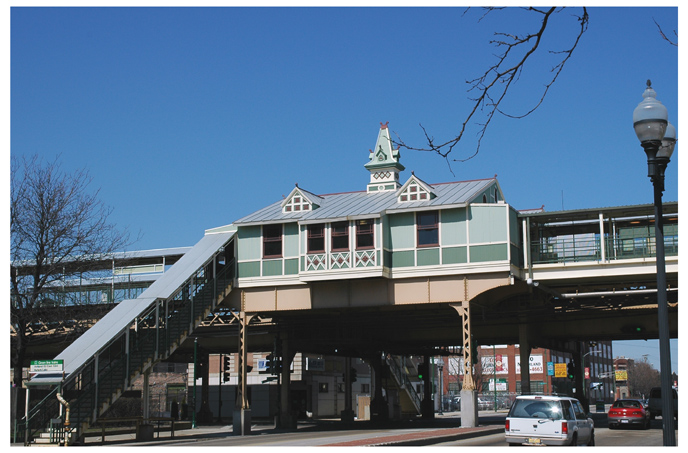
One of Ashland's station houses in 2005. The original Morgan station was of a similar design, but would have had staircases on both sides of the station house.

The original Morgan station had two station houses, one on each platform, designed in a "gingerbread" Queen Anne style, similar to the other stations on the route and the surviving station houses at Ashland. The station houses were heated by potbelly stoves, and while earlier plans had called for their ticket agent's booths to be placed on the sides of the station houses facing the street, they ended up being placed in alcoves adjacent to the platforms. The construction of the Lake Street Elevated's stations was contracted to Frank L. Underwood of Kansas City and Willard R. Green of New York, who subcontracted to the Lloyd and Pennington Company.

=== Modern station (2012–present) ===
The new Morgan station is modern in design and was designed by Ross Barney Architects.

=== Ridership ===
Between 1900 and 1948, Morgan's ridership was fairly low by "L" standards, although from 1916 it consistently had the highest ridership on the Lake Street Elevated between Lake Street Transfer and Halsted. The original Morgan station's ridership peaked at 299,993 in 1920. After the late 1920s, the station's ridership declined precipitously along with that of surrounding stations; 1927 was the last year the station served more than 200,000 passengers, and 1931 the last year it served more than 100,000. In its last full year of operation, 1947, it served 78,516 riders. A spike in its ridership occurred during the first months of 1948, which gave it 222,231 riders compared to Halsted's 180,951. Its 1947 performance made it the 213th-busiest out of 222 "L" stations at least partially staffed, whereas its 1948 ridership made it the 162nd-most ridden of 223 such stations at the beginning of the year. (Note: Several stations on the Niles Center and Westchester branches were permanently unstaffed and thus did not collect ridership statistics. Exchange station on the Stock Yards branch discontinued statistics after 1946, but its neighbor Racine station began collecting them in 1948.)

== Works cited ==
- CTA Rail Entrance, Annual Traffic, 1900–1979 (Report). Chicago: Chicago Transit Authority. October 1, 1979.
- Moffat, Bruce G. (1995). The "L": The Development of Chicago's Rapid Transit System, 1888–1932. Chicago: Central Electric Railfans' Association. ISBN 0-915348-30-6.
