= Union Park (Chicago) =

Municipal park in Chicago, Illinois, United States

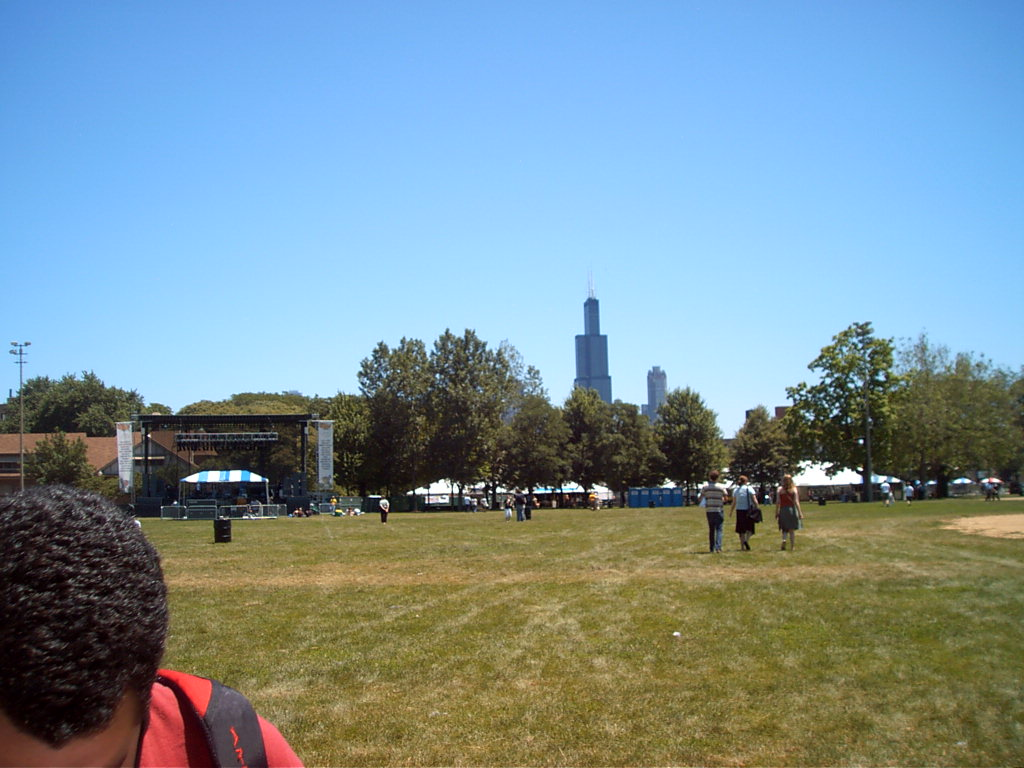
- Union Park with the Sears Tower in the background, c. 2006.
- Interactive map of Union Park
- Type: Urban park
- Location: Near West Side, Chicago, Illinois
- Coordinates: 41.8840°N 87.6655°W
- Area: 13.46 acres (54,500 m^{2})
- Created: 1853
- Operator: Chicago Park District
- Status: Open all year (daily 6 a.m. to 11 p.m.)
- Public transit: Ashland (CTA Green and Pink Lines station)
- Website: www.unionparkchicago.com

Union Park is a municipal park in Chicago, Illinois, comprising 13.46 acres (5.45 ha).

Located in the Near West Side, the park is just south of Ashland/Lake station on the Green and Pink lines of the Chicago 'L', bordered by North Ashland Avenue on the west, West Lake Street on the north, the diagonal North Ogden Avenue along most of the east border, and West Washington Boulevard on the south. The park has several large green fields used for demonstrations or various forms of football, playgrounds, a swimming pool, a fieldhouse, tennis and pickleball courts, baseball fields, and basketball courts.

While the name was chosen in 1853 in reference to the United States' federal union, Union Park has a considerable labor history. The surrounding neighborhood is the home of most of the city's labor union offices, including the United Electrical, Radio and Machine Workers of America, the Teamsters, LIUNA, the Workers United Hall, and over a dozen others.

In the 1910s, the park was one of the only racially integrated parks in the city. In 2006, the park was the starting point for Chicago's wing of the 2006 immigration reform protests, including the Great American Boycott on International Workers' Day, which were the largest demonstrations in the history of Chicago to date. It is also the site of the annual Pitchfork Music Festival, North Coast Music Festival, and many other music festivals and political protests. In 2006, the city commissioned a statue of James Connolly, an Irish republican and Marxist who was executed in 1916, on the south west corner.
