= Ridgeland station =

Chicago "L" station

Ridgeland 400W 100S
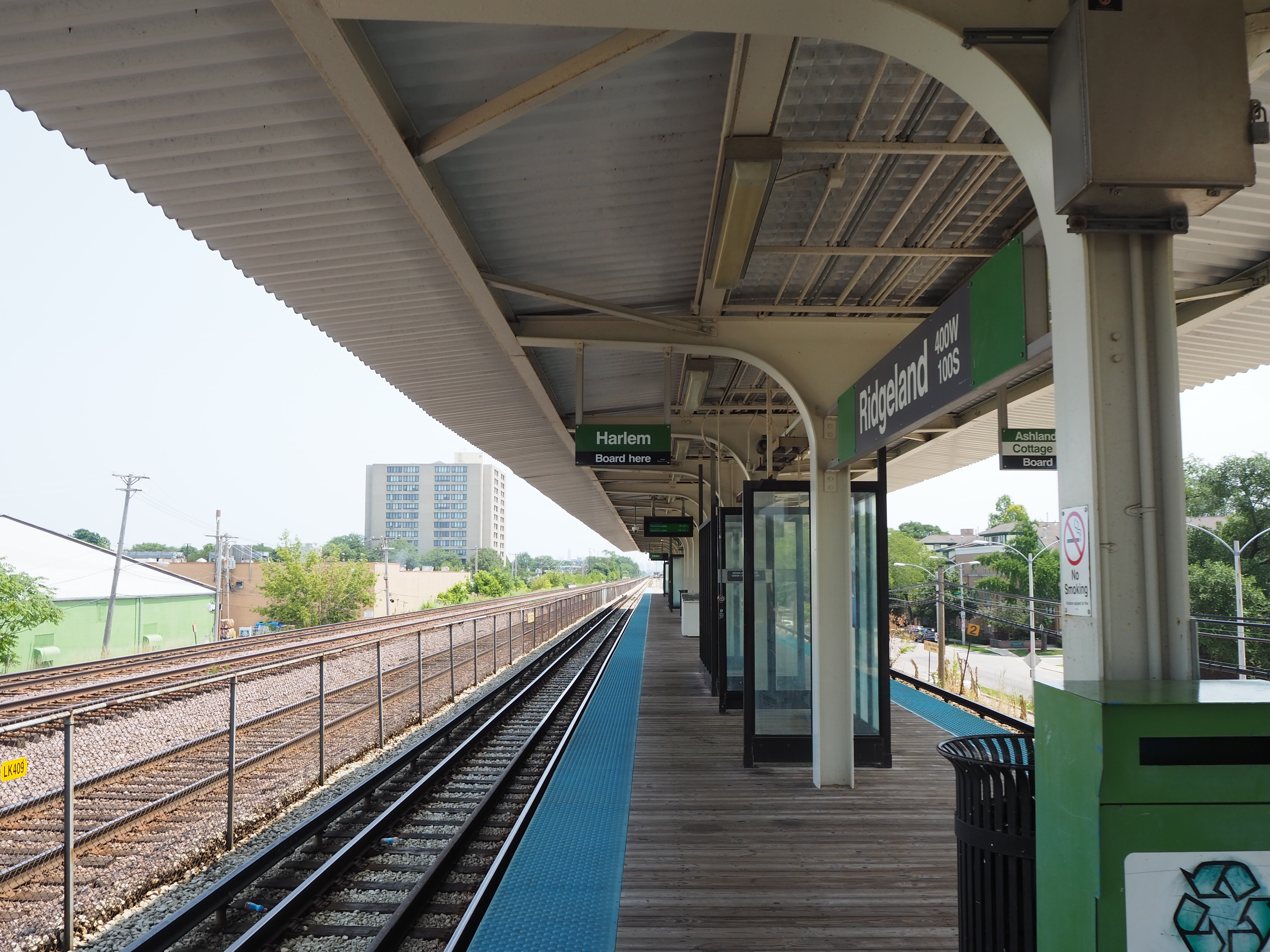

General information
- Location: 36 South Ridgeland Avenue; Oak Park, Illinois 60302
- Coordinates: 41.886955°N 87.784628°W
- Owner: Chicago Transit Authority
- Line: Lake Branch
- Platforms: 1 island platform
- Tracks: 2 tracks

Construction
- Structure type: Embankment
- Accessible: No

History
- Opened: January 25, 1901
- Rebuilt: 1962

Passengers
- 2025: 235,394 ▲12%

Services
Preceding station	Chicago "L"	Following station
Oak Park toward Harlem/Lake	Green Line	Austin toward Ashland/63rd or Cottage Grove
Former services
Preceding station	Chicago and North Western Railway	Following station
Avenue toward Geneva	Galena Division	Austin Boulevard toward Chicago
Preceding station	Chicago "L"	Following station
Oak Park toward Harlem/Lake	Lake Street Elevated	Lombard Closed 1948 toward Loop (Randolph/Wells) or Market Terminal
Track layout
Location

Ridgeland is a station on the Chicago Transit Authority's 'L' system, serving the Green Line. It is located in the suburb of Oak Park, just west of Chicago. To the north of the station is the triple tracked Union Pacific West Line.

== History ==
Ridgeland station was opened on January 25, 1901, by the Lake Street Elevated Railroad as a surface-level station on the line that ran parallel to the former Chicago and Northwestern Railway line (today's Union Pacific West Line), alongside South Boulevard in Oak Park. Both lines created an unsafe grade crossing, especially as the community moved from horse-powered vehicles to the automobile. When the C&NW elevated its line between 1908 and 1909, it created a blind spot for traffic trying to cross the Lake Street Line.

On October 28, 1962, the station was elevated on an embankment, and the main entrance was rebuilt, taking advantage of the small space left over to include the ticket hall and functional furniture. When the Green Line closed for a renovation project in 1994 and later reopened on May 12, 1996, Ridgeland station was reopened with only minor alterations made to it; such as a repaint, new fare controls, and new signage. Upon its reopening, an Oak Park disabled residents committee strongly protested because Ridgeland, along with the other Oak Park stations of Austin and Oak Park, is one of the few Green Line stations inaccessible to people with disabilities; however there are plans to make the station accessible at some point beyond 2027.

== Station layout ==
The station consists of a two tracks single island platform with an entrance at the west end of the platform. There formerly existed an entrance at the eastern end of the platform, but this entrance has been permanently closed.

== Bus connections ==
CTA

- 86 Narragansett/Ridgeland (weekdays only)

Pace

- 309 Lake Street
- 313 St. Charles Road
- 314 Ridgeland Avenue (Monday–Saturday only)
