= Clinton station (CTA Green and Pink Lines) =

Chicago "L" station

Clinton 540W 200N
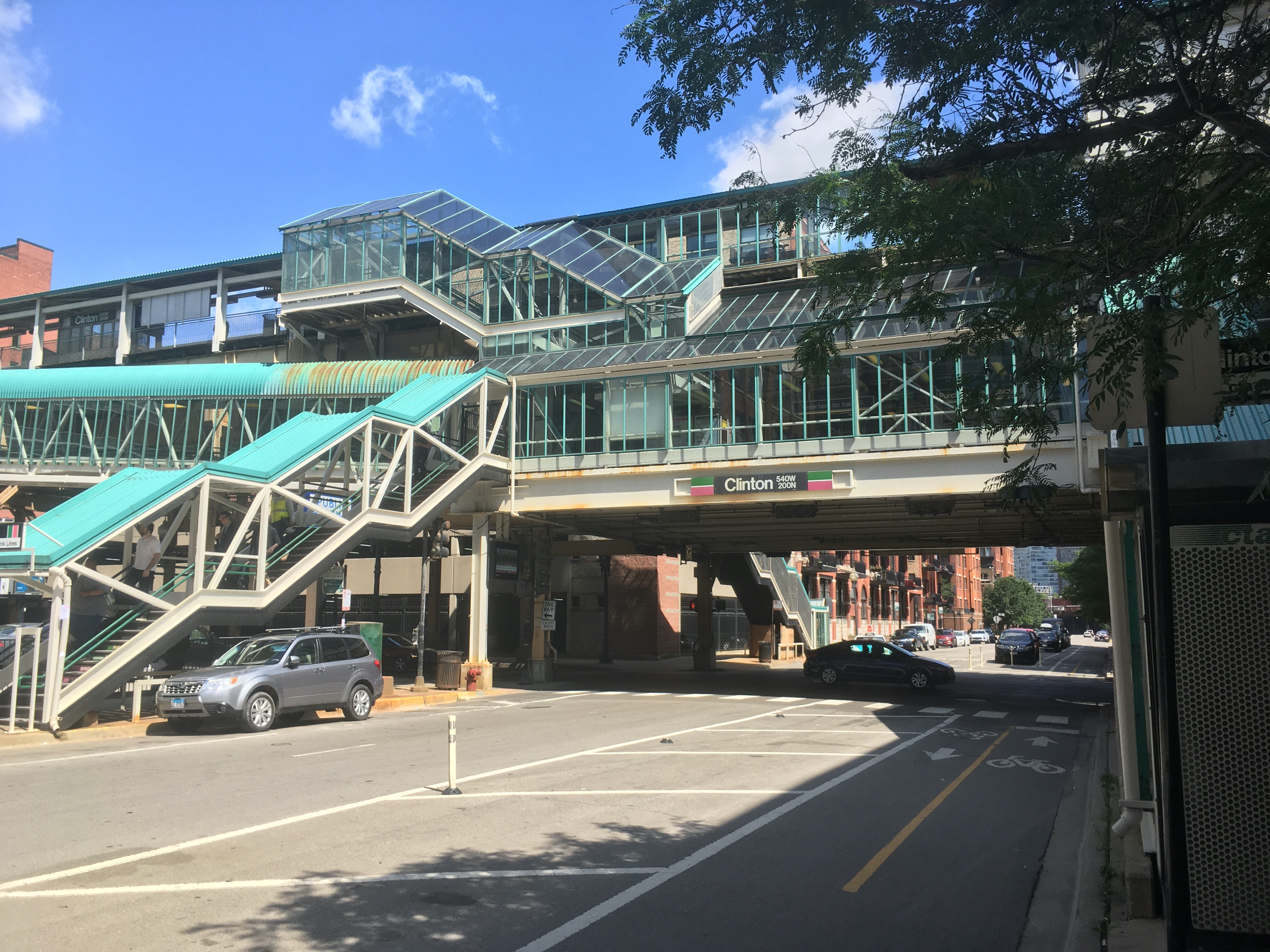

General information
- Location: 540 West Lake Street; Chicago, Illinois 60661
- Coordinates: 41.885678°N 87.641782°W
- Owner: Chicago Transit Authority
- Line: Lake Branch
- Platforms: 2 side platforms
- Tracks: 2
- Connections: at Ogilvie

Construction
- Structure type: Elevated
- Cycle facilities: Yes
- Accessible: Yes

History
- Opened: October 16, 1909; 117 years ago
- Rebuilt: 1970; 56 years ago, 1996; 30 years ago
- Former names: Clinton/Northwest Passage

Passengers
- 2025: 882,048 ▲12.2%

Services
Preceding station	Chicago "L"	Following station
Morgan toward Harlem/Lake	Green Line	Clark/Lake toward Ashland/63rd or Cottage Grove
Morgan toward 54th/Cermak	Pink Line	Clark/Lake Loop-bound terminus
Morgan toward 54th/Cermak	Pink Line	Washington/Wells One-way operation
Former services
Preceding station	Chicago "L"	Following station
Halsted Closed 1994 toward Harlem/Lake	Lake Street Elevated	Fifth/Lake Closed 1899 toward Loop (Randolph/Wells)
Halsted Closed 1994 toward Harlem/Lake	Lake Street Elevated Market Street branch	Randolph/Market toward Market Terminal
Track layout
Location

Clinton is a station on the Chicago Transit Authority's 'L' system, serving the Green Line and Pink Line. It opened on October 16, 1909, and was completely rebuilt during the Green Line rehabilitation project in 1996.

== History and location ==
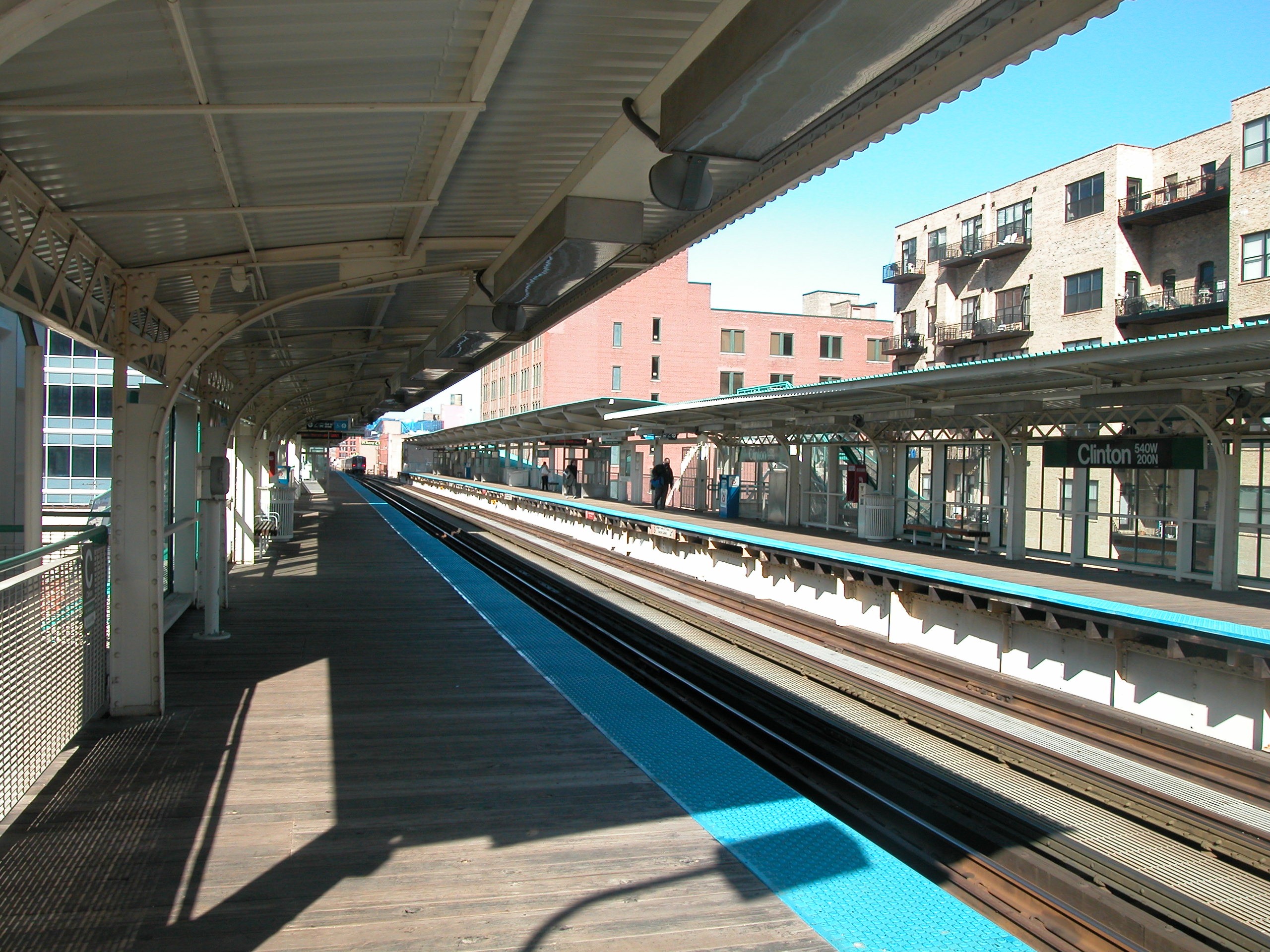
Station platform

=== Canal ===
Opening in 1893 as part of the newly opened Lake Street Elevated, the Canal station was located above Canal Street west of the Chicago River and railroads leading up to Union Station. The station was eventually closed in 1909 and was replaced by the newly opened Clinton station a block west.

=== Clinton ===
In 1911, two years after the opening of Clinton station, an adjacent passenger terminal station, the C&NW Terminal, opened. The stations were connected in 1970 with a passageway, called the "Northwest Passage". The passageway closed in 1990 when the C&NW Terminal was rebuilt as Ogilvie Transportation Center, replaced by a holding track for Metra trains. Today, it remains the closest "L" station to the passenger terminal whose platforms directly abut Clinton.

The station, along with many other stations along the newly-established Green Line, was closed from 1994 to 1996 for reconstruction.

== Bus connections ==
CTA

- J14 Jeffery Jump
- 56 Milwaukee
- 125 Water Tower Express (weekday rush hours only)
