= Stub terminals of the Chicago "L" =

Former rapid transit stations

In the first half of the 20th century, the four companies of the Chicago "L" and their successors each ran a terminal in Chicago's downtown in addition to the looping elevated trackage known as "the Loop" shared between all four of them. These terminals were the Congress Terminal of the South Side Elevated Railroad, the Market Street Terminal of the Lake Street Elevated, the eventual Wells Street Terminal of the Metropolitan West Side Elevated Railroad, and the North Water Terminal of the Northwestern Elevated Railroad. The Lake Street uniquely had an intermediate station on Randolph Street between its stub terminal and main line.

With the exception of the North Water Terminal, the terminals had predated the Loop's construction and opening. (Note: The Metropolitan had a terminal on Franklin Street prior to the Loop's opening, but closed and demolished it afterwards; it built the Wells Street Terminal as a replacement in 1904.) The railroads had opened between 1892 and 1895, with the exception of the Northwestern. The Loop, having been planned and agreed upon by the companies in 1894, was constructed and opened in phases between 1895 and 1897. The old terminals were then closed.

However, the Loop frequently overflowed, so the terminals were reopened or rebuilt in the early 20th century to accommodate excess traffic during rush hours. The Northwestern, despite not opening until well after Loop service had begun, built a terminal over North Water Street. In addition to their role in overflow traffic, they served various interurbans that ran on "L" trackage – the Congress Terminal served the North Shore Line, while the Wells Street Terminal was the eastern end of the Chicago Aurora and Elgin Railroad (CA&E).

The Loop's chronic congestion was resolved by the construction of the State Street subway in 1943 and the Dearborn Street subway in 1951, while the interurbans declined in the same era. The Market Street terminal and Randolph Street station were both closed in 1948 and demolished shortly thereafter. "L" service to the Congress Terminal was discontinued in 1949, and that to the Wells Street Terminal in 1951. However, the CA&E continued using the Wells Street Terminal until 1953, and the North Shore Line continued to use the Congress Terminal for luggage until 1963. All of the stub terminals have been demolished and few traces remain of them.

== Background ==
Although plans for Chicago to have rapid transit dated to 1869, it would not come to the city until the South Side Elevated Railroad opened in June 1892. In quick order, the Lake Street and Metropolitan West Side Elevated Railroads would also open in 1893 and 1895, respectively. The Northwestern Elevated Railroad, the final company constructing the Chicago "L", was plagued by delays in construction and would not open until 1900.

While right of way was fairly easy to acquire outside of the downtown area, retail opposition to elevated railroads in the central business district hindered efforts to serve it. All three "L" companies in operation settled on building terminals on the outer edges of downtown. Although each company intended to improve its terminal, Charles Tyson Yerkes conceived of the idea of looping trackage to be operated by all four companies, which was readily agreed to.

== Congress Terminal ==
The South Side originally operated between Congress and 39th Streets. Congress Terminal was used from 1892 to 1949.

== Market Street Terminal ==
The Lake Street operated eastward on its eponymous street until it reached Market Street, thence turning south to Madison where its terminal was held. It had another station on Randolph Street on its Market Street trackage.

== Franklin/Wells Street Terminal ==
The Metropolitan opened originally to Canal, but after a week extended across the Chicago River to Franklin Street.

== North Water Terminal ==
Unlike the other three companies, the Northwestern did not begin operation until 1900, well after the Loop was in operation. Nevertheless, it also saw fit to construct a stub terminal to handle overflow traffic. It closed in 1949.

== Post-Loop era ==
The Loop overflowed, and the terminals were rebuilt or reopened to accommodate the excess.
