= Randolph/Market station =

Former station on the Chicago "L"

RANDOLPH & MARKET 360W 150N
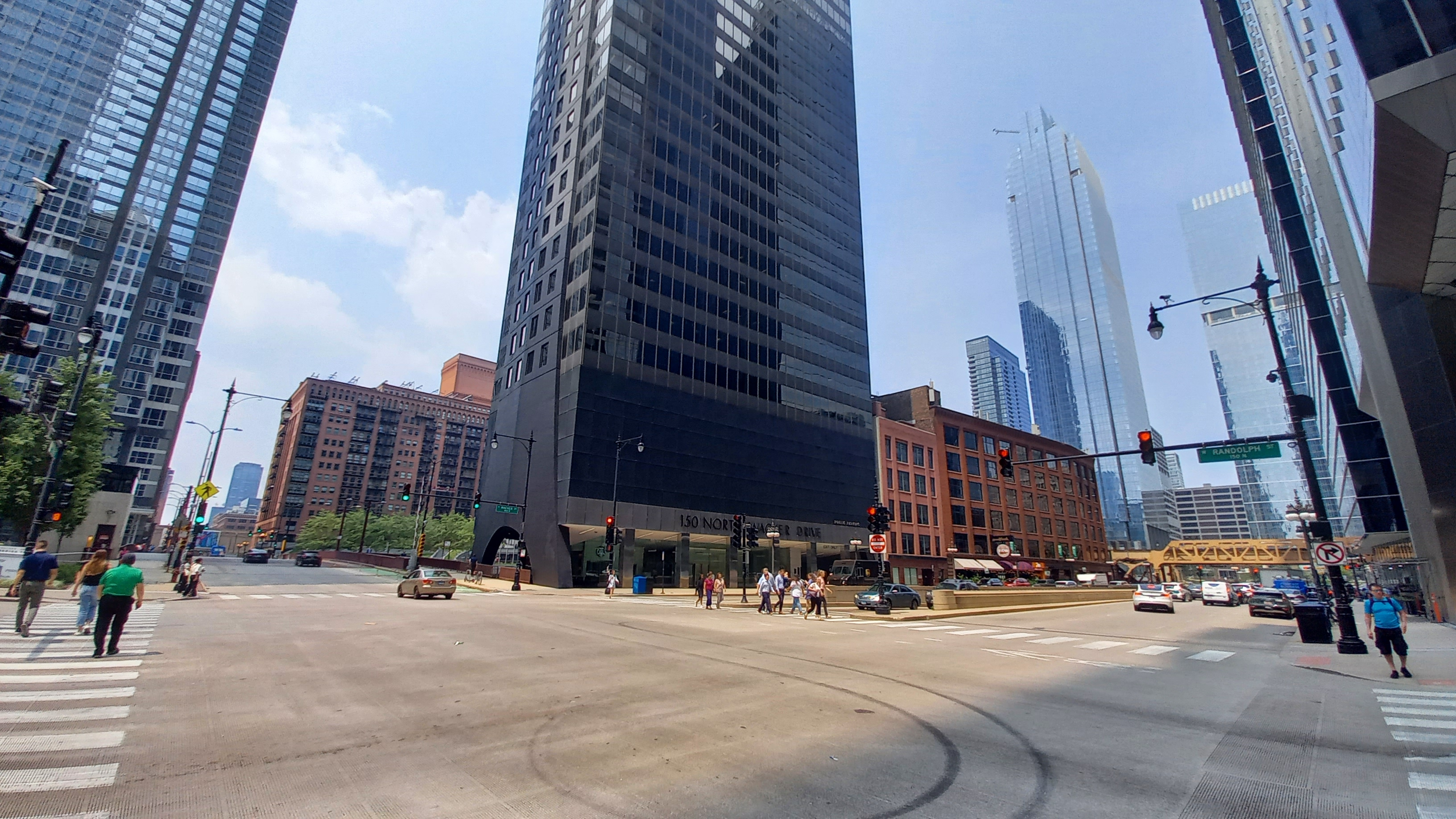
- Site of former Randolph/Market station (2023)

General information
- Location: Randolph Street and Market Street; Chicago, Illinois
- Coordinates: 41.88443°N 87.63693°W
- Owner: Chicago Transit Authority
- Line: Lake Street Elevated
- Platforms: 1 island platform

Construction
- Structure type: Elevated

History
- Opened: November 6, 1893
- Closed: April 5, 1948

Former services
Preceding station	Chicago "L"	Following station
Clinton toward Forest Park	Lake Street Elevated Market Street branch	Market Terminal Terminus
Location

Randolph/Market was a station on the Chicago "L"'s Lake Street Elevated, serving its Market Street stub between the main line and the Market Street Terminal. It was the only intermediate station on the Market Street stub, and on any of Chicago's terminal stubs. It opened with the rest of the Elevated on November 6, 1893. After the Loop was built downtown, only overflow and express services ran on the Market Street stub. The stub, and Randolph station, closed on April 5, 1948, and was demolished shortly afterwards.
