= Green Line (CTA) =

Chicago "L" rapid transit line

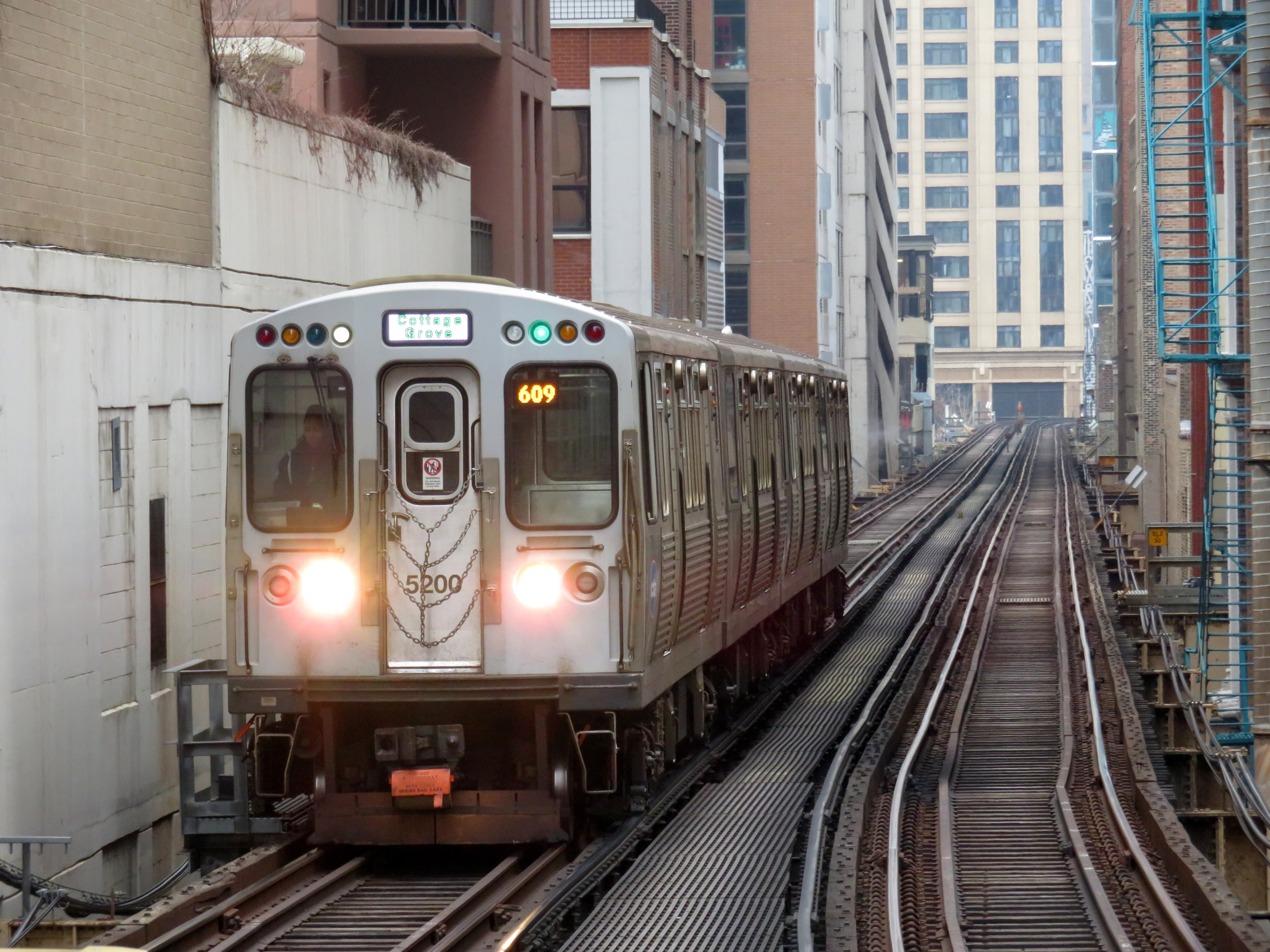
- A Cottage Grove-bound Green Line train of 5000-series cars approaching Roosevelt.

Overview
- Status: Operational
- Locale: Chicago, Oak Park, and Forest Park, Illinois, United States
- Termini: Harlem/Lake; Ashland/63rd, Cottage Grove
- Stations: 31
- Website: CTA Green Line

Service
- Type: Rapid transit
- System: Chicago "L"
- Operator: Chicago Transit Authority
- Depot(s): Ashland Yard, Harlem Yard
- Rolling stock: 5000-series 6-car trains (typical); 8-car maximum
- Daily ridership: 24,693 each weekday (2024)

History
- Opened: Oldest section: June 6, 1892; 134 years ago Current operation: February 21, 1993; 33 years ago

Technical
- Line length: 20.695 mi (33.305 km)
- Character: Embankment and elevated
- Track gauge: 4 ft 8 1/2 in (1,435 mm) standard gauge
- Minimum radius: 90 feet (27 m)
- Electrification: Third rail, 600 V DC
Route map
Green Line highlighted in green

The Green Line is a rapid transit line in Chicago, Illinois, operated by the Chicago Transit Authority (CTA) as part of the Chicago "L" system. It is the only completely elevated route in the "L" system. All other routes may have various combinations of elevated, subway, street level (at grade), or freeway median sections. This line is also the only route with three terminals: trains departing Harlem/Lake alternate destinations between Ashland/63rd and Cottage Grove.

The Green Line utilizes the system's oldest segments, dating back to 1892. It extends for 20.695 miles (33.305 km), with 31 stations between Oak Park/Forest Park (Harlem/Lake) and Chicago's West Side, to the Loop, and then to the South Side neighborhoods of West Englewood (Ashland/63rd) and Woodlawn (Cottage Grove/63rd).

== Route ==
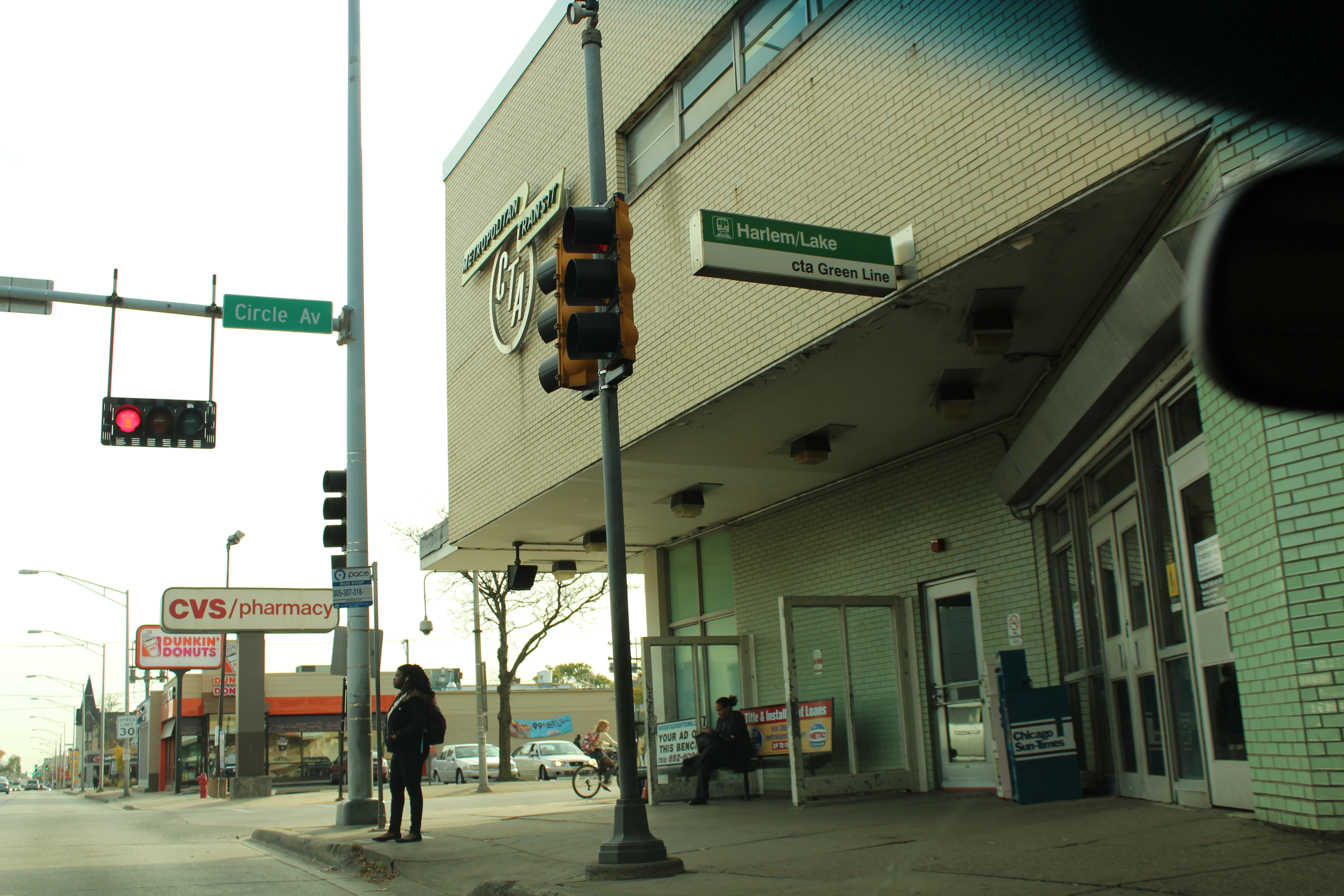
Harlem/Lake Green Line entrance in Forest Park/Oak Park (2015)

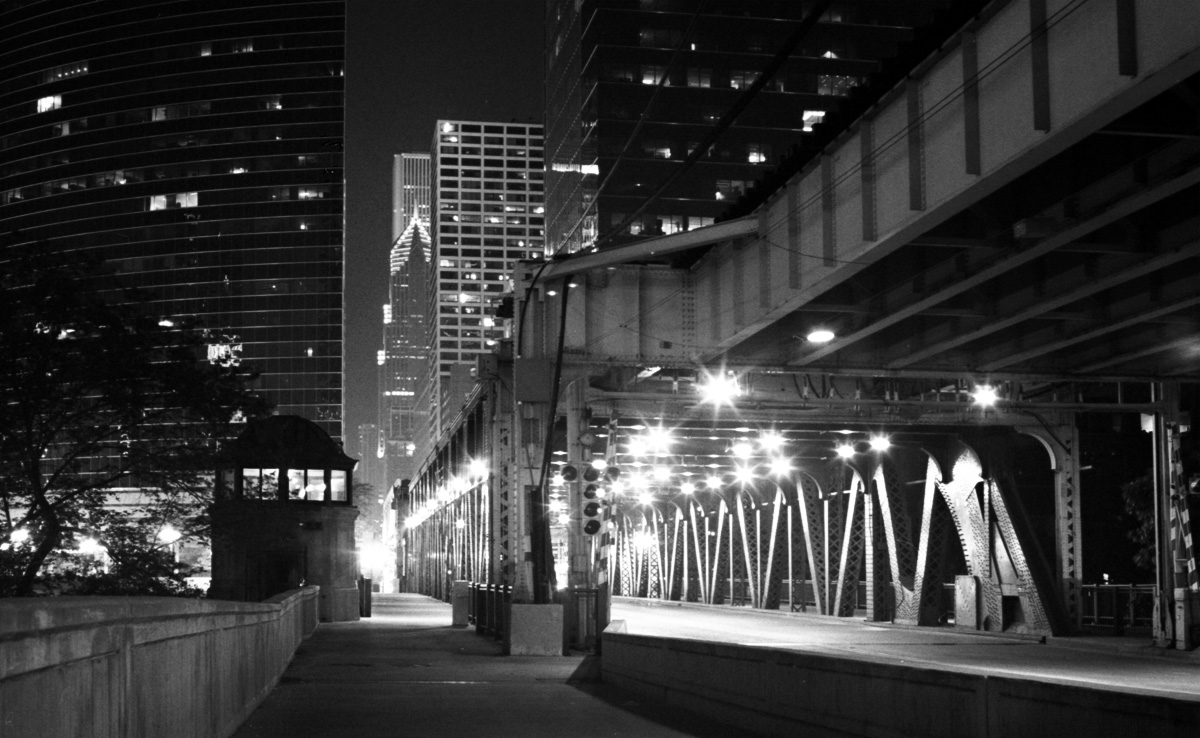
The Lake Street Elevated bridge over the Chicago River at night (2005)

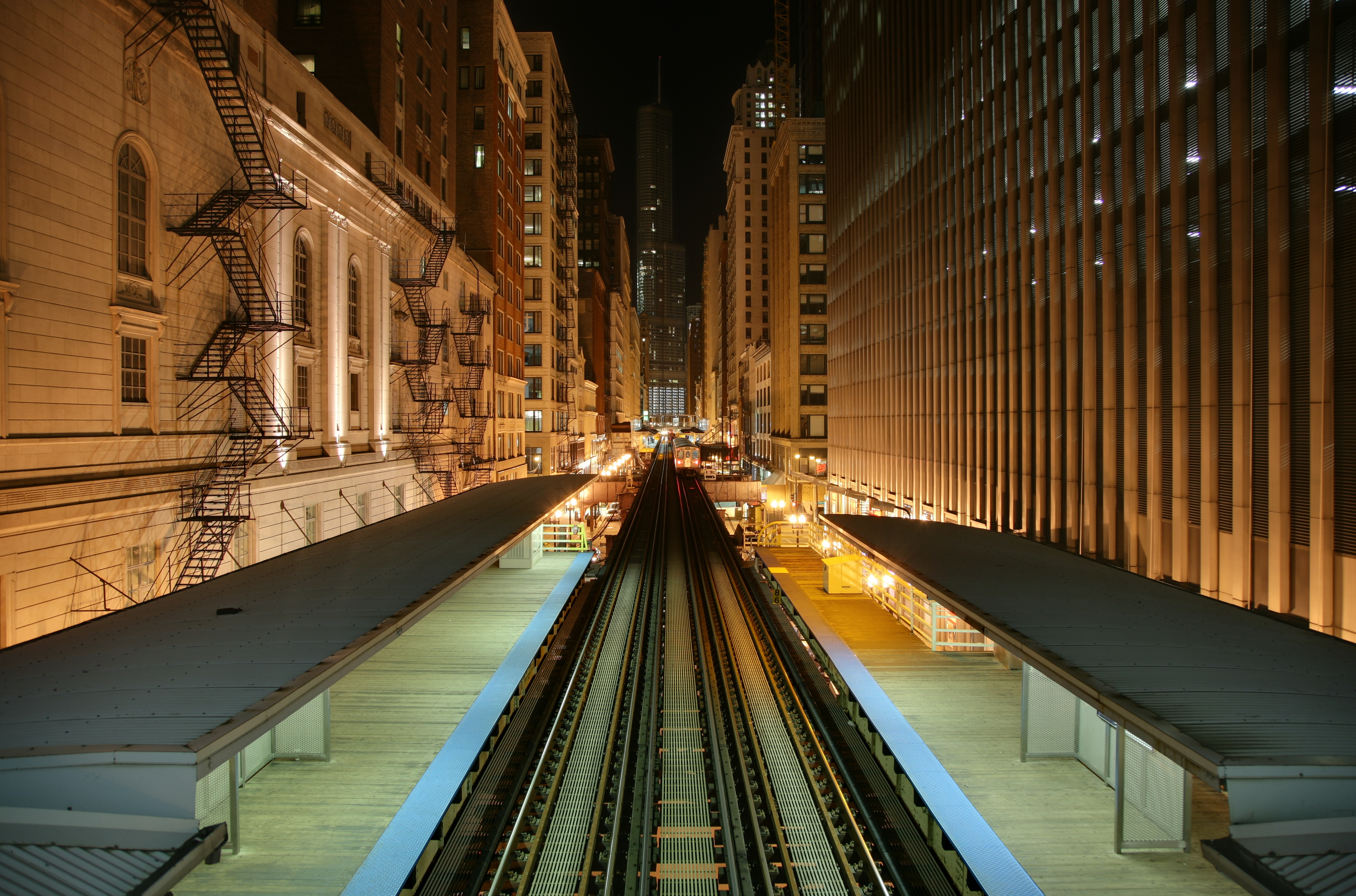
Northward view from the Adams/Wabash station at night (2009)

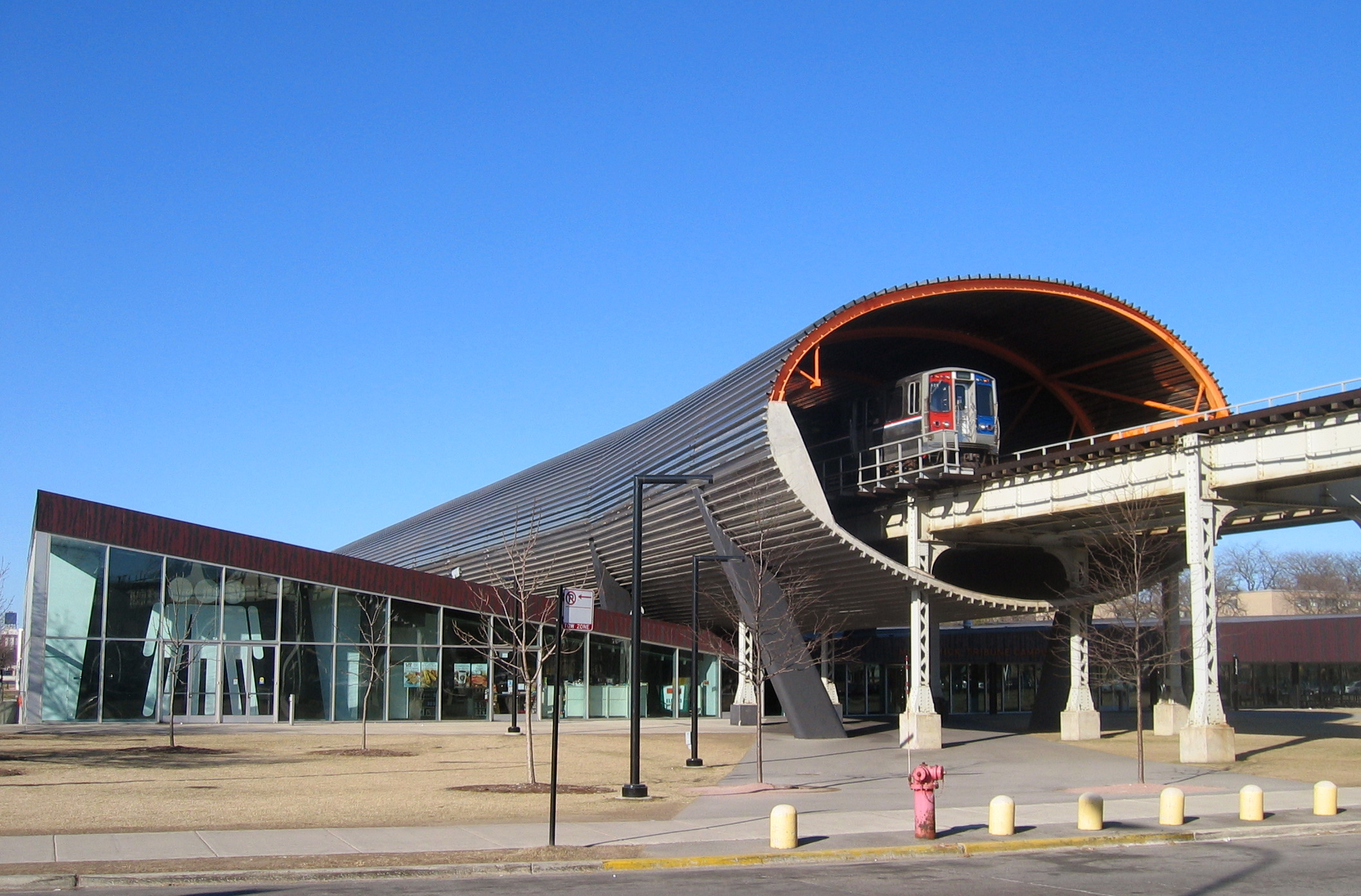
A southbound train passes over the McCormick Tribune Campus Center at the Illinois Institute of Technology (2006)

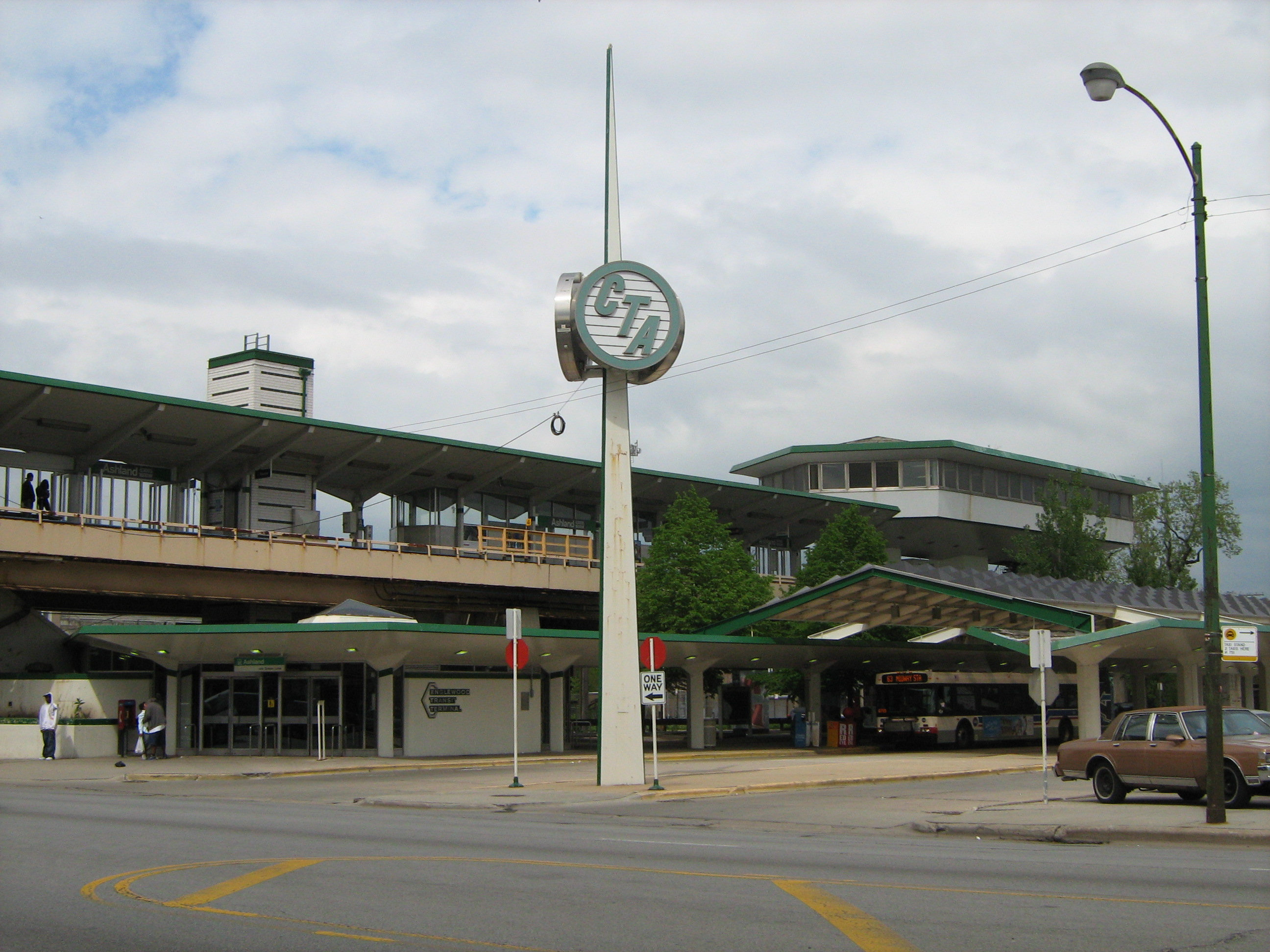
The Englewood branch's Ashland/63rd station and terminal (2009)

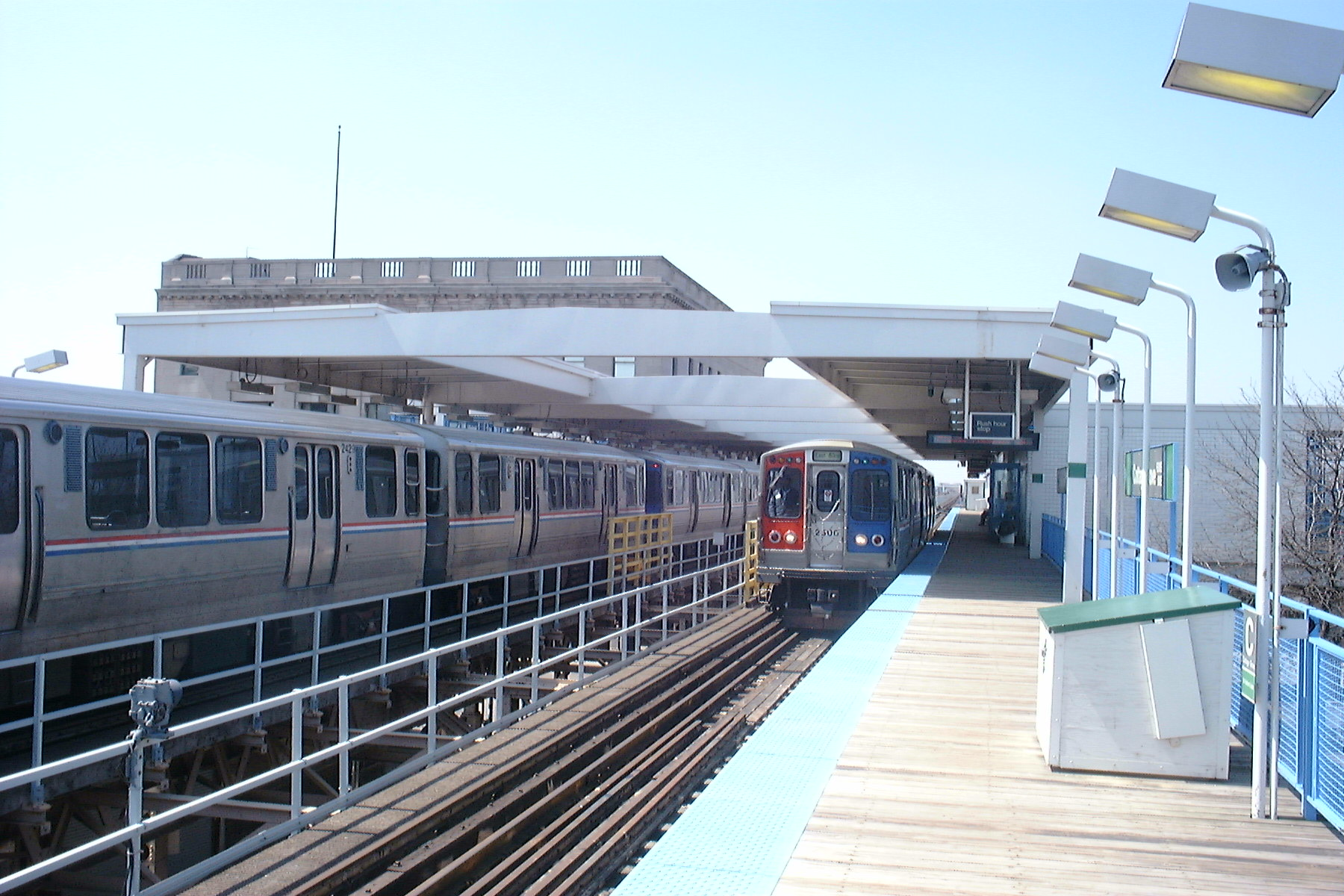
Cottage Grove station (2002)

=== Lake Street Elevated ===
Beginning at the yard and inspection facilities in Forest Park, the Green Line runs east through Oak Park towards the city on an embankment adjacent to Metra's Union Pacific West Line tracks from the Harlem Avenue terminal, on the border of Oak Park and Forest Park, to a point just west of Laramie Avenue. Here, the Green Line tracks diverge from the railroad embankment and continue east on a steel elevated structure directly above Lake Street, a major east–west thoroughfare.

The "L" bridges a couple of railroad tracks (the Belt Railway of Chicago's main line and Union Pacific's Rockwell Subdivision) before entering downtown Chicago at Clinton Street. East of Clinton Street, the route bridges Metra's Union Pacific railroad tracks (which terminate just south of here at Ogilvie Transportation Center) and the Chicago River before joining the Union Loop "L" tracks at Wells Street.

=== The Loop ===
In downtown Chicago, the Green Line operates over the famous Union Loop "L" structure along with Brown Line (Ravenswood), Orange Line (Midway), Pink Line (Douglas) and Purple Line Express (weekday rush hours only) trains. Green Line trains operate both ways over the Lake Street and Wabash Avenue sides only, and do not use the Wells Street and Van Buren Street sides of the Loop.

The Green Line is the only line in the "L" system that has two entry/exit points to the elevated Loop, the only "L" line that runs in both directions in the Loop, and the only route that uses the Loop but does not terminate there. Its route uses the Wabash and Lake sides of the Loop, which are also used by the Orange, Pink, Purple and Brown Lines, which operate around the Loop and then return to their route terminal.

=== South Side Elevated ===
Leaving the Loop at Tower 12, the tracks continue along Wabash Avenue and follows an "S" curve (which was realigned in 2002) to the west and south now following the alley (Holden Court) between Wabash Avenue and State Street to 40th Street. This 3.8 mile section is the oldest part of Chicago's "L" system. On this segment, the Green Line shares tracks with the Orange Line between the Loop and 17th Street. Passengers can transfer between the two lines at Roosevelt/Wabash station.

The other stations on this section are at Cermak–McCormick Place and 35th–Bronzeville–IIT, adjacent to the Illinois Institute of Technology campus and the Chicago Police Department Headquarters. At 40th Street, the route turns east to Indiana station, then turns south between Calumet and Prairie Avenues to the Garfield station and continues south to 59th Street where the route splits into two branches—the Englewood (Ashland/63rd) branch and the Jackson Park (East 63rd) branch. Prior to 1994, (and the Green Line's major renovation), the East 63rd branch extended as far east as Stony Island Avenue. It was shortened to University in 1982 and Cottage Grove in 1996.

==== Ashland branch ====
The Ashland branch continues south and west following 59th Street, Princeton Avenue and 63rd Street to the Ashland terminal in West Englewood. The yard and inspection shop lie to the south between the old Racine station and the Ashland/63rd terminal. The "L" tracks continues west to a stub end at Hermitage Avenue. Prior to 1992, the Englewood branch had stations at Wentworth Avenue where it crosses over the Dan Ryan Expressway and at Harvard Avenue, closed by the CTA for service cuts. Halsted/63rd is the only remaining intermediate station on the 3.1 miles (5.0 km) route.

The Englewood branch was permanently renamed the Ashland branch as of March 2013 according to the CTA.

==== East 63rd branch ====
The East 63rd branch continues south from the mainline between Calumet and Prairie Avenues, passing the old yard and inspection facilities at 61st Street in Washington Park. South of here, the route curves east over 63rd Street and follows it to the current terminal at Cottage Grove/63rd in Woodlawn. Prior to 1982, the Jackson Park branch continued east, with stations at University Avenue and Dorchester Avenue, before crossing the Metra Electric Line and terminating at Stony Island Avenue. The branch was cut back to University in 1982 due to structural defects in the bridge carrying the tracks over the Metra Electric. While the CTA had planned to restore service to Dorchester as part of the Green Line refurbishment, local community opposition led to the eastern terminus being cut back to Cottage Grove when the line reopened in 1996. In addition to losing the University/63rd station, the Jackson Park branch also lost the intermediate stations at 61st Street and the 58th Street during the 1994-1996 closure.

== Operating hours and headways ==
The Green Line operates weekdays from 4 a.m. to 1 a.m., and Saturdays and Sundays from 5 a.m. to 1 a.m. Between Harlem/Lake and Garfield, trains run on a minimum headway of 12 minutes, decreasing to as few as 10 minutes during weekday rush hours. Headways are doubled on the branches to Ashland/63rd and Cottage Grove.

== Rolling stock ==
The Green Line is operated with the Bombardier-built 5000-series railcars. The 5000-series cars officially began running on the Green Line on July 1, 2012, after the Pink Line became fully equipped with the new cars. As additional 5000-series cars were assigned to the Green Line, the remaining 2400-series cars were reassigned to the Red, Purple and Orange Lines to finish their service lives. Occasionally, 2600-series and 3200-series railcars were used on the Green Line, though these were loaned from the Blue, Brown, and Orange Lines, and only when the Green Line was short on cars.

With the 5000-series cars now completely equipping the Green Line fleet after the last of the 2400-series cars were reassigned in mid-May 2013, the borrowing of 2600-series cars and 3200-series cars is no longer necessary. The Green Line was the second line to be fully equipped with the 5000-series cars, following the Pink Line. Frequently, the Green and Pink Lines borrow each other's cars when either line is short on cars. Trains operate using six cars full time as of 2020.

== History ==
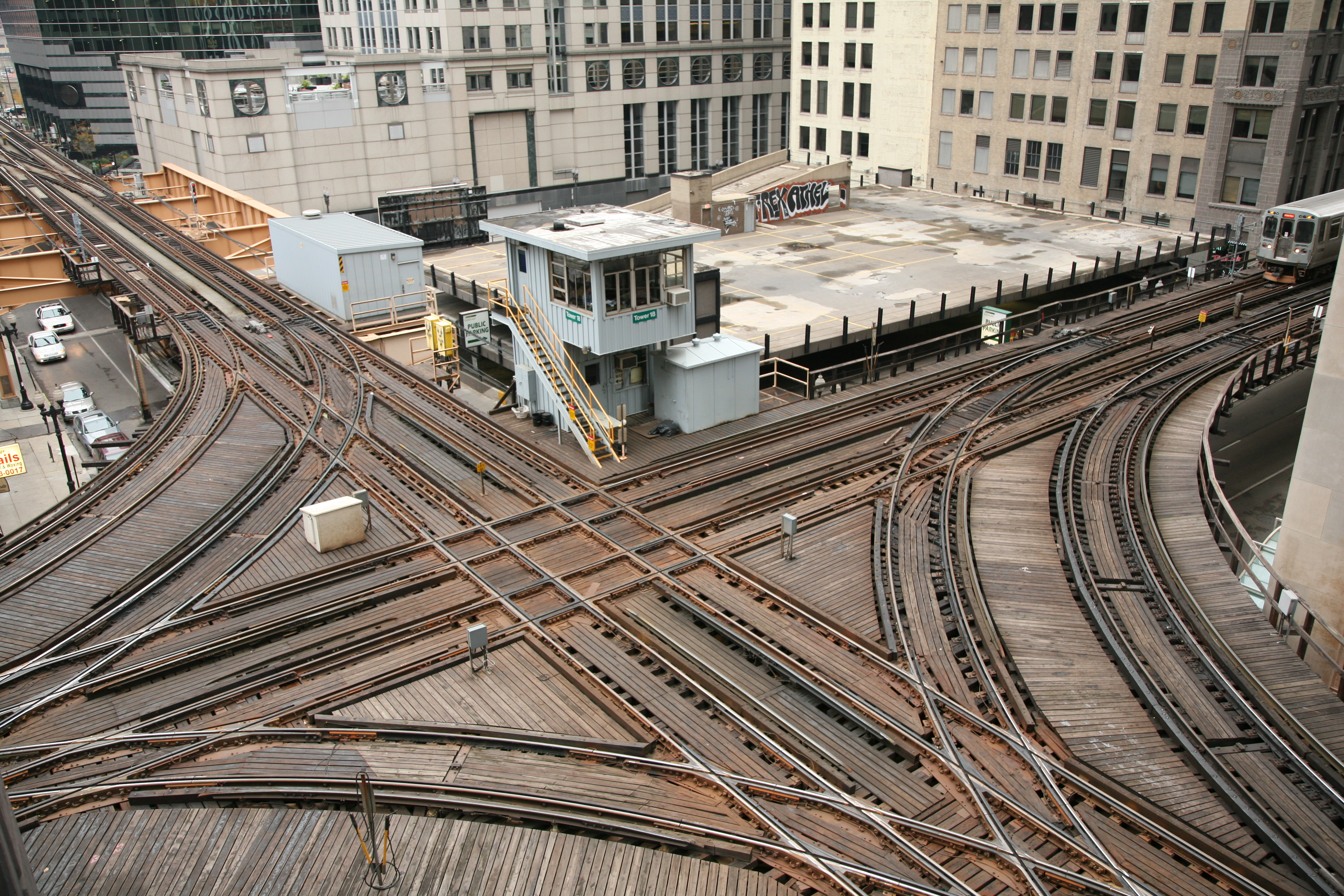
Chicago Transit Authority signal tower 18 guides Chicago "L" trains, north and southbound Purple and Brown lines intersecting with east and westbound Pink and Green lines and the Orange Line above the Wells and Lake street intersection in the Loop.

The Green Line operates over the two oldest sections of the Chicago "L". The South Side section started operation in 1892 when Chicago was preparing for the World's Columbian Exposition of 1893 in Jackson Park. The initial section was built to provide inexpensive mass transportation service between downtown Chicago and the exposition site. This first section of the Chicago and South Side Rapid Transit Railroad between Wabash Avenue and State Street went into service on June 6, 1892. It extended from Congress Street only as far south as 39th Street (Pershing Road). At that time a large part of the south side was little more than prairie, but by May 1, 1893, when the pioneer "L" line was completed to Jackson Park, construction of homes, apartment buildings and commercial properties was booming in the area.

Continued expansion of the area development was reflected in construction of the Englewood, Normal Park, Kenwood and Stock Yards branches of the South Side "L" between 1905 and 1908. Of these, only the Englewood and Jackson Park branches remain: because of insufficient patronage, the Normal Park, Stock Yards and Kenwood branches were closed in the 1950s.

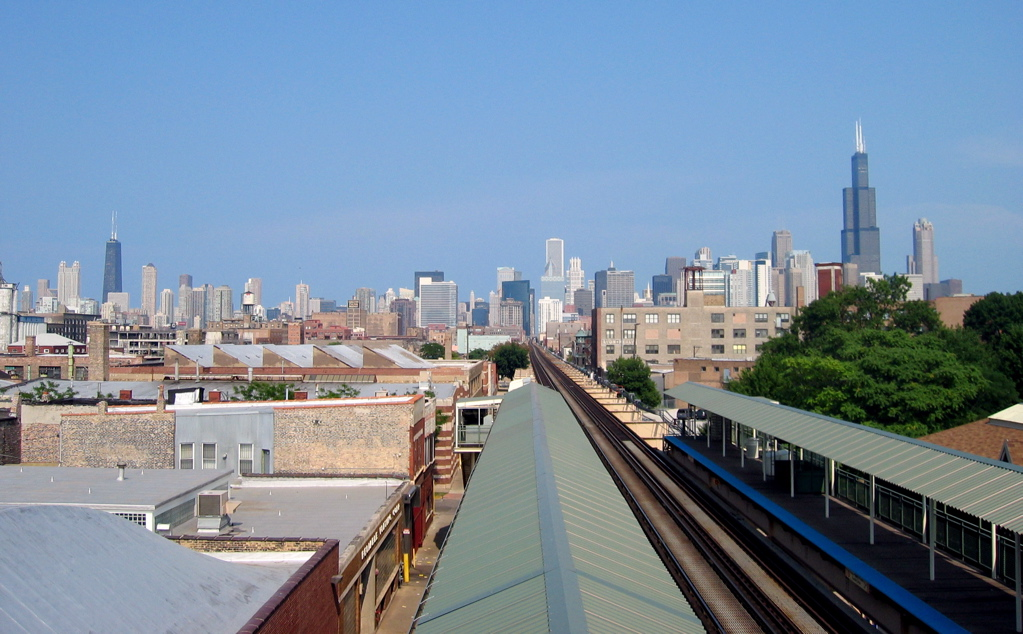
View from Ashland station along the Lake Street section of the Green Line (2005)

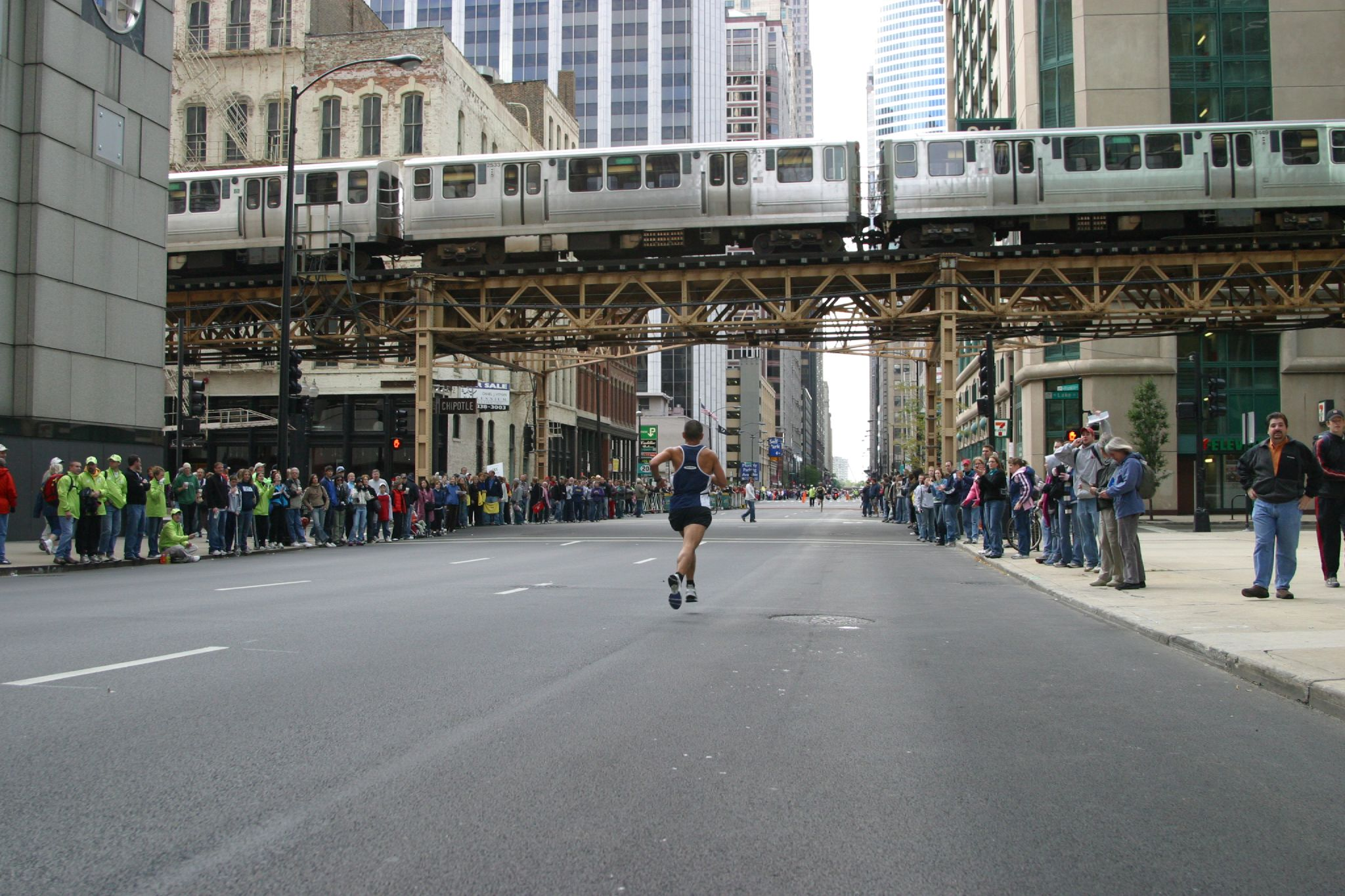
Green Line elevated tracks crossing Franklin Street in the Loop (2005)

Chicago Transit Authority Chicago "L" route map

The Lake Street Elevated was Chicago's second rapid transit line. It began operation from a terminal at Madison and Market streets to Lake Street and California Avenue on November 6, 1893. The line was gradually extended westward to Laramie Avenue on April 29, 1894; to Austin Avenue on April 15, 1899; to Wisconsin Avenue, Oak Park using street railway trackage on May 15, 1899 (closed in 1902), and to Marengo Avenue, Forest Park, on May 14, 1910.

The construction of the Lake Street Elevated led to a political quarrel in west suburban Cicero, which at the time included Oak Park and Austin. In 1898, Austinites, having a majority on Cicero's town council, used political influence to allow the extension of the Lake Street line from the city border at Laramie Avenue (then called 52nd Avenue) into their community. This infuriated other Cicero residents, who retaliated the following year by holding a joint election to force Austin's annexation to the City of Chicago. Much to the dismay of local residents, this effort succeeded, and Austin became part of Chicago in 1899. A century later, Oak Park commuters, who had come to depend on the service, were among the most vocal critics of the Green Line's closure for rehabilitation.

From 1913 until 1993, the Englewood and Jackson Park branches were part of the North–South Route in various service configurations operating from the north side through the Loop and to the south side. On October 17, 1943, the Englewood and Jackson Park services were rerouted into the State Street subway to provide improved crosstown access through the heart of city and to alleviate congestion on the over-crowded Union Loop Elevated. On July 31, 1949, during the north–south rapid transit service revision by the CTA, the Howard–Englewood/Jackson Park route was created, operating via the State Street subway, using the 13th Street portal.

On May 6, 1969, the Englewood branch was extended to the current Ashland/63rd terminal, replacing the outmoded facilities at the 1907-built Loomis station which were demolished. On December 12, 1982, the Jackson Park branch was shortened to University because of structural deterioration at the Dorchester Bridge which carried the route across the Illinois Central Railroad to the former Stony Island/63rd terminal which closed on March 4, 1982, and was later demolished.

The Lake Street "L" would remain largely unchanged until 1948, when a number of its historic passenger stations were closed and demolished in an attempt to promote the "A" and "B" skip-stop express train service to speed up traffic flow. On October 28, 1962, the western two and one-half mile section of the line which operated at street level was elevated along the Chicago and Northwestern Railroad right-of-way opening new elevated stops at Central, Austin, Ridgeland, Oak Park, and Harlem.

In September 1969, the Lake Street "L" was united with the new Dan Ryan Line to form the West–South Route (Lake-Dan Ryan), operating from Forest Park through downtown via the Union Loop "L" to 95th/Dan Ryan. The Lake–Dan Ryan routing was to fulfill the service implementation outlined in the 1968 Chicago Central Area Transit Plan. However, when that subway project was canceled in 1979, Lake–Dan Ryan service remained and lasted for 24 years.

In February 1993, the South Side sections of the North–South and West–South Routes were "switched" south of Roosevelt Road, creating the current Red Line (Howard–Dan Ryan) and the Green Line (Lake–Englewood/Jackson Park). After the reconfiguration, both the Red and Green Lines lost their "A" and "B" skip-stop service and began serving all stations at all times. As stated earlier, the Green Line's routing united the two oldest segments of Chicago's "L"-Subway rail network.

In January 1994, the Green Line closed for the largest transit rehabilitation project in the city's history. The Green Line reopened on May 12, 1996, with much of the renewal work completed and with the exception of a few stations. Six stations (Homan, Halsted, 58th, 61st, University, and Racine) were closed permanently following the rehabilitation project, which angered many commuters who depended on the Green Line.

In September 1997, after political pressure brought on by community leaders, the Jackson Park branch was shortened again from University to Cottage Grove after previous attempts by the city, CTA, and other agencies to extend the route eastward to Dorchester, immediately west of the Illinois Central Railroad. This had seemed logical to the Dorchester Terminal, due to the fact that the Metra Electric District and South Shore Line both share a station along the IC ROW, at 63rd Street.

In April 1998, the Green Line, the Purple Line, and the Douglas branch of the Blue Line (now the Pink Line) lost their 24/7 service due to budget cuts, and operates only between the hours of 4 a.m. and 1 a.m, weekdays and weekends.

=== Incidents ===
On February 4, 1977, an accident occurred on the sharp left-hand curve at Wabash/Lake. Two trains were involved, one was the Ravenswood Line with the second being the Lake-Dan Ryan Line. The Ravenswood train was stopped waiting for the clearance to proceed. The motorman of the Lake-Dan Ryan train failed to see the signals warning him of a stopped train. What occurred was a rear-end collision, the initial collision was only minor. However the motorman continued to apply power forward; which led to three cars being pushed off the elevated tracks to the street below. The fourth car was dangling while still attached to the other four cars on the track. Eleven deaths were reported with more than 180 injuries.

On May 28, 2008, a derailment was reported, with approximately 24 injuries. Two train cars on the four-car train appeared to be derailed, with the leading car abutting the one behind it at an angle of approximately 150 degrees. The train cars were separated at a switching point near 59th Street.

On August 5, 2015, a derailment was reported near 63rd and Calumet in Chicago's Washington Park neighborhood. The train derailed around 2:40 p.m., the third of the four-car train was the one to derail. No one was injured, firefighters had to help over 80 passengers off the train; two of which were in wheelchairs. Service was suspended between the Cottage Grove and Garfield stops. Service was back to normal in the affected stops around 7:15 p.m.

On June 6, 2019, a Green Line train derailed near the 47th station, injuring seven people.

On February 10, 2025, a Green Line train derailed at 63rd Street and Normal Boulevard on the elevated tracks near Halsted. The train derailed at around 2:40am, trapping 15 passengers, and only 3 people suffered minor injuries. Service was suspended between Garfield and 63rd/Ashland. Service on the Ashland branch was restored on February 12, 2025.

== Green Line expansion ==
During the 2010s, the Green Line has undergone significant expansion in an attempt to attract more transit riders and improve upon its service connectivity on the West Side, Loop, and South Side communities. The Morgan/Lake station opened in May 2012 in response to the growing Fulton Market and West Loop areas. It was followed by the opening of the new Cermak–McCormick Place station in February 2015, serving the historic Motor Row District and McCormick Place Convention Center. Both stations were designed by Chicago-based Ross Barney Architects.

The Garfield station's $43 million reconstruction project, completed in January 2019, restored its original 1892-built station house and improved the in-service station house. It included escalator and elevator enhancements and new platform canopies, lights, graphics, public artwork, and streetscape. The project created a new "Garfield Gateway" station in the Washington Park neighborhood on the South Side.

A station on the Lake Street "L" at Damen/Lake opened on August 5, 2024, replacing a former station at that site from 1893 to 1948. Designed by world-renowned architectural firm Perkins&Will, who also designed the Cumberland station on the O'Hare Extension in 1980, the new $60 million Damen station filled what was a 1.5-mile (2.4 km) gap between the California and Ashland stations.

Along the Green Line South, the former 58th station, which was located approximately 3/8 miles (600 meters) south of the Garfield station and one-block north of the Jackson Park and Englewood branches split, had been bereft of a transfer facility between the diverging Green Line services since 1994. The branch lines themselves consists of two stations each (Halsted and Ashland/63rd on the Englewood branch; King Drive and Cottage Grove on the Jackson Park Branch).

While no official plans have been developed, the possibility of extending the tracks once again and reconstructing a new Stony Island/63rd terminal station (which was the former terminus of this eastern branch) to serve the Barack Obama Presidential Center would be very advantageous. Passenger traffic on this CTA line, as well as all CTA lines, has been steadily increasing for decades, and more expansion on the historic CTA Green Line could continue this growth.

== Station listing ==
Location	Station	Connections/Notes
Oak Park/ Forest Park	Harlem/Lake	Metra: Union Pacific West (at Oak Park); CTA bus: 90; Pace buses: 307, 309, 313, 318
Oak Park	Oak Park	Pace buses: 309, 311, 313
Oak Park	Ridgeland	CTA bus: 86; Pace buses: 309, 313, 314
Austin	Austin	CTA bus: 91; Pace buses: 309, 313, 315
Austin	Central	CTA bus: 85
Austin	Laramie	CTA bus: 57
Austin	Cicero	CTA bus: 54; Pace bus: 392
West Garfield Park	Pulaski	CTA bus: 53
East Garfield Park	Conservatory–Central Park Drive	
East Garfield Park	Homan	Closed January 9, 1994; demolished; replaced by Conservatory–Central Park Drive
East Garfield Park	Kedzie	Metra: Union Pacific West (at Kedzie); CTA bus: 52
East Garfield Park	California	CTA bus: 94
Near West Side	Damen	CTA bus: 50
Near West Side	Ashland	Chicago "L": Pink; CTA buses: 9 X9
Near West Side	Morgan	
Near West Side	Halsted	Closed January 9, 1994; demolished
Near West Side	Clinton	Chicago "L": Pink; Metra: Union Pacific North, Union Pacific Northwest, Union Pacific West (at Ogilvie); CTA bus: 56
The Loop	Clark/Lake	Chicago "L": Blue Brown Orange Purple Pink; CTA Bus: 22 24 134 135 136 156
The Loop	~~State/Lake~~	Temporarily closed for reconstruction until mid-2029
The Loop	Randolph/Wabash	Closed September 3, 2017; demolished and replaced by Washington/Wabash
The Loop	Washington/Wabash	Metra: Metra Electric (at Millennium Station); NICTD: Lakeshore Corridor, Monon Corridor (at Millennium Station); Chicago "L": Red (at Lake) (Note: Temporarily, during the closure of State/Lake.); CTA Bus: N4 J14 20 56 60 N66 124 147 157
The Loop	Madison/Wabash	Closed March 16, 2015; demolished and replaced by Washington/Wabash
The Loop	Adams/Wabash	Chicago "L": Purple Orange Brown Pink; CTA Bus: 1 7 28 126 151
Near South Side	Roosevelt	Chicago "L": Red Orange; Metra: Metra Electric (at Museum Campus/11th Street); NICTD: Lakeshore Corridor, Monon Corridor (at Museum Campus/11th Street); CTA buses: 1 3 4 X4 12 18 29 62 130 146 192
Near South Side	Cermak–McCormick Place	CTA buses: 1 3 4 X4 21 29
Douglas	35th–Bronzeville–IIT	Metra: Rock Island (at 35th Street); CTA buses: 29 31 35
Grand Boulevard	Indiana	CTA bus: 39
Grand Boulevard	43rd	CTA buses: 3 43
Grand Boulevard	47th	CTA buses: 3 47
Grand Boulevard/ Washington Park	51st	CTA buses: 3 15 51
Washington Park	Garfield	Transfer between Ashland/63rd and Cottage Grove-bound trains.; CTA buses: 3 55
Washington Park	58th	Closed January 9, 1994; demolished
Service splits into Ashland branch and East 63rd branch

=== Ashland branch ===
Location	Station	Connections/Notes
Englewood	Halsted	CTA buses: 8 63
Englewood	Racine	Closed January 9, 1994; scheduled for reopening by January 2031
West Englewood	Ashland/63rd	CTA buses: 9 X9 63

=== East 63rd branch ===
Location	Station	Connections/Notes
Washington Park	61st	Closed January 9, 1994; demolished
Woodlawn	King Drive	Inbound boarding only.; CTA buses: 3 63
Woodlawn	Cottage Grove	CTA buses: 4 X4 63
Woodlawn	University	Closed January 9, 1994; demolished
