= Forest Park station (CTA Lake Street Elevated) =

Former rapid transit station

FOREST PARK 7300W 100S
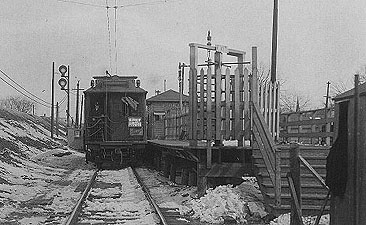
- Station platform, c. 1910s

General information
- Location: Marengo Avenue and Circle Avenue; Forest Park, Illinois
- Coordinates: 41°53′13″N 87°48′27″W
- Owner: Chicago Transit Authority
- Line: Lake Street Elevated
- Platforms: 1 island platform

Construction
- Structure type: At-grade

History
- Opened: May 20, 1910
- Closed: October 28, 1962

Former services
Preceding station	Chicago "L"	Following station
Terminus	Lake Street Elevated	Marion toward Loop (Randolph/Wells) or Market Terminal
Location

Forest Park was an at-grade station on the Chicago Transit Authority's 'L' system, serving as the former western terminus of the Lake Street Elevated.

== History ==
The station was opened in 1910 as part of an extension of the Lake Street "L" into the Chicago and North Western Transportation Company's Forest Park yard. The Marion station had served as the terminal of the line since 1901. Passenger service was operated with a single track, but was expanded to two tracks by 1946. In 1962, the at-grade stations of the Lake Street "L" were moved onto the abandoned C&NW embankment, as the local stations had been abandoned since 1958. The elevation prompted the merger of the Forest Park station and the Marion station into the current Harlem/Lake station.
