= Market Street Terminal =

Former rapid transit station in Chicago

MARKET ST. TERMINAL 360W 1N
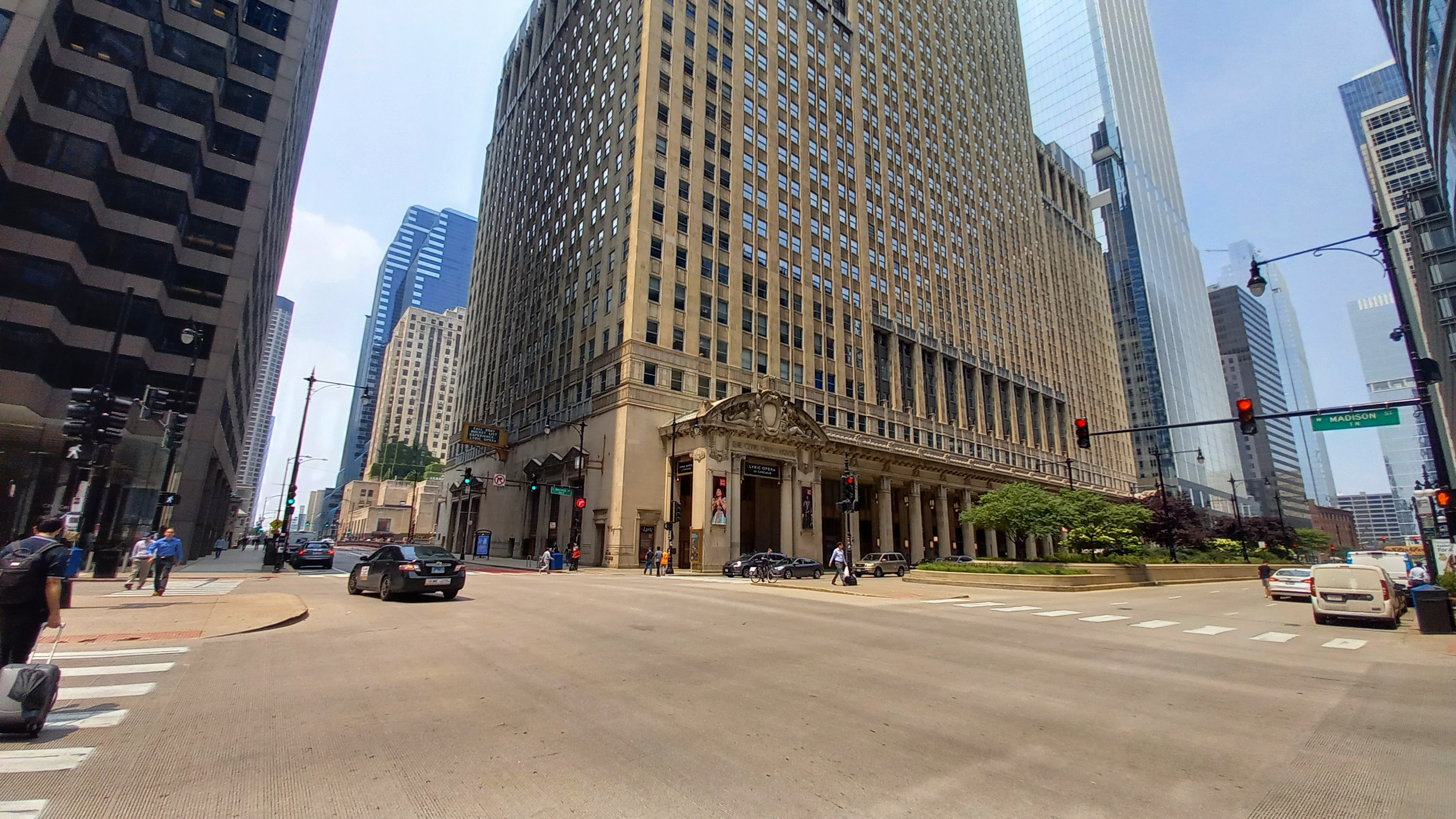
- Site of the former terminal station (2023)

General information
- Location: Madison Street and Market Street; Chicago, Illinois
- Coordinates: 41°52′55″N 87°38′13″W
- Owner: Chicago Transit Authority
- Line: Lake Street Elevated
- Platforms: 1 island platform

Construction
- Structure type: Elevated

History
- Opened: November 6, 1893
- Closed: April 5, 1948

Former services
Preceding station	Chicago "L"	Following station
Randolph/Market toward Forest Park	Lake Street Elevated Market Street branch	Terminus
Location

The Market Street Terminal was a station on the Chicago "L"'s Lake Street Elevated – today part of the Green Line – between 1893 and 1948. The Elevated's original downtown terminus, it opened at the corner of Madison Street and Market Street (modern-day Wacker Drive) on November 6, 1893, alongside the rest of the Elevated. When the Loop was constructed in 1895, the Terminal was required to be demolished but no action was taken. When it closed in 1948, only overflow traffic served it. It was demolished shortly thereafter for the construction of double-decked Wacker Drive.

== See also ==
- Stub terminals of the Chicago "L"
