= List of former Chicago "L" stations =

Rapid transit rail stations

This is a list of former stations on the Chicago "L". This list includes stations that have been demolished, partially demolished, reopened, and stations that are abandoned or closed, but are not open for passenger service.

The majority of these stations existed on now demolished "L" lines, but some exist on current lines.

== Stations ==
Key for closed stations
Symbol	Meaning
Ⓣ	Designated transfer stations within the Chicago "L" system
†	Terminal station

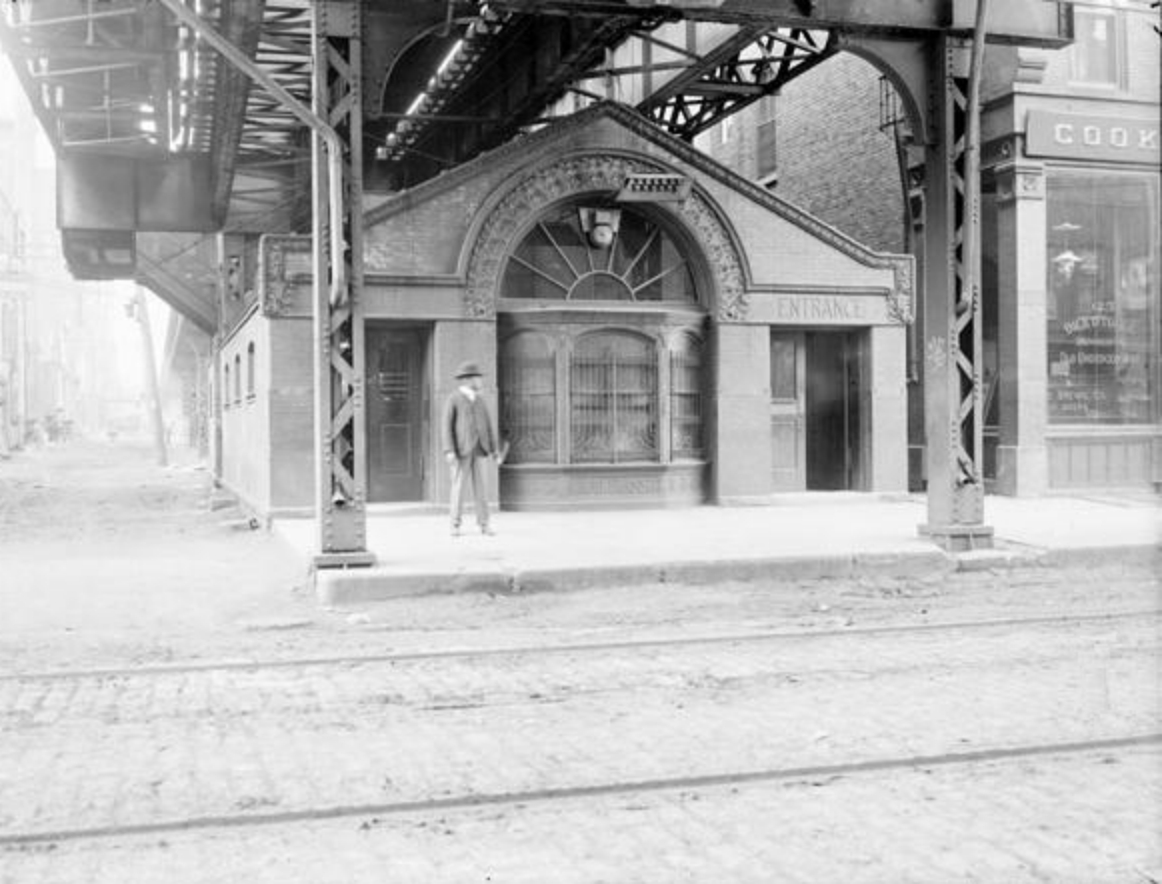
18th on the South Side Main Line

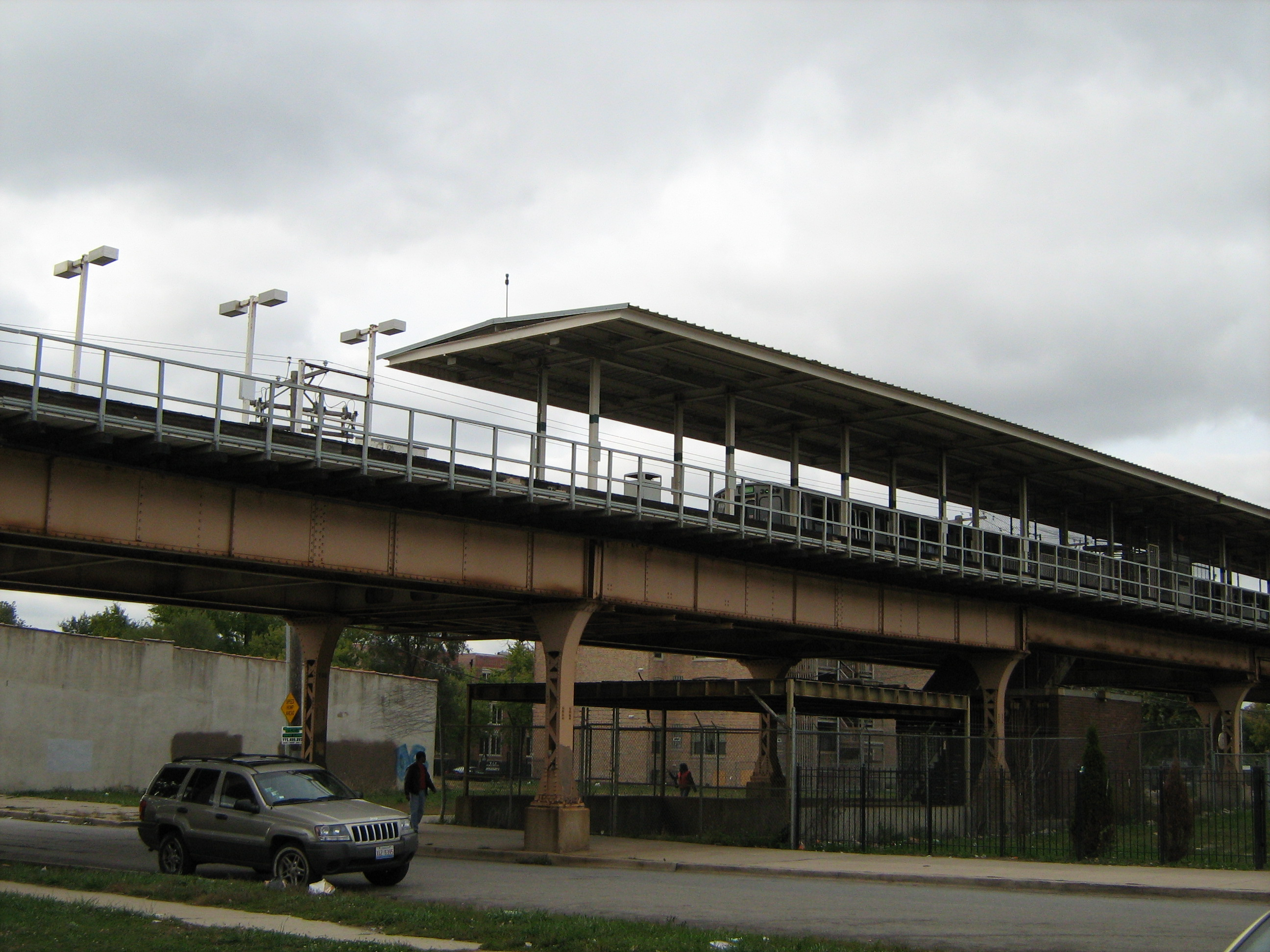
58th

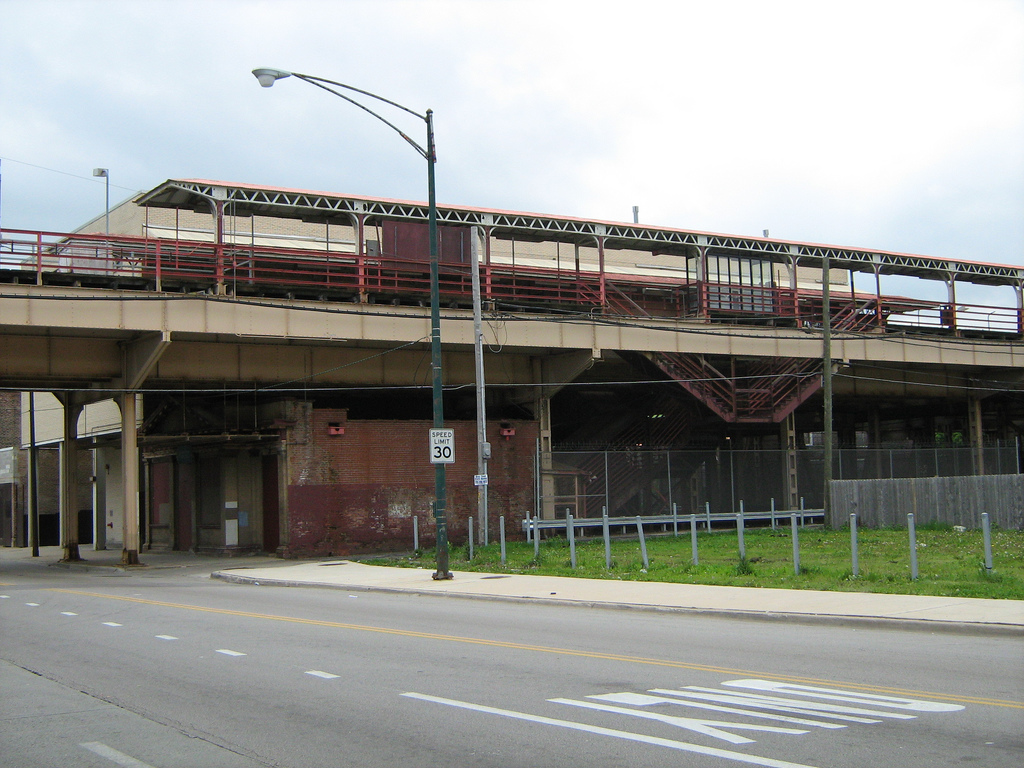
Racine on the Englewood branch

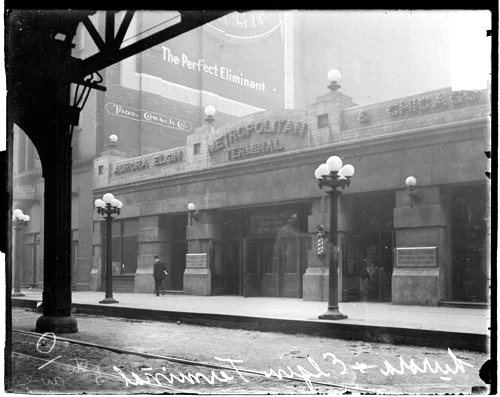
The Wells Street Terminal

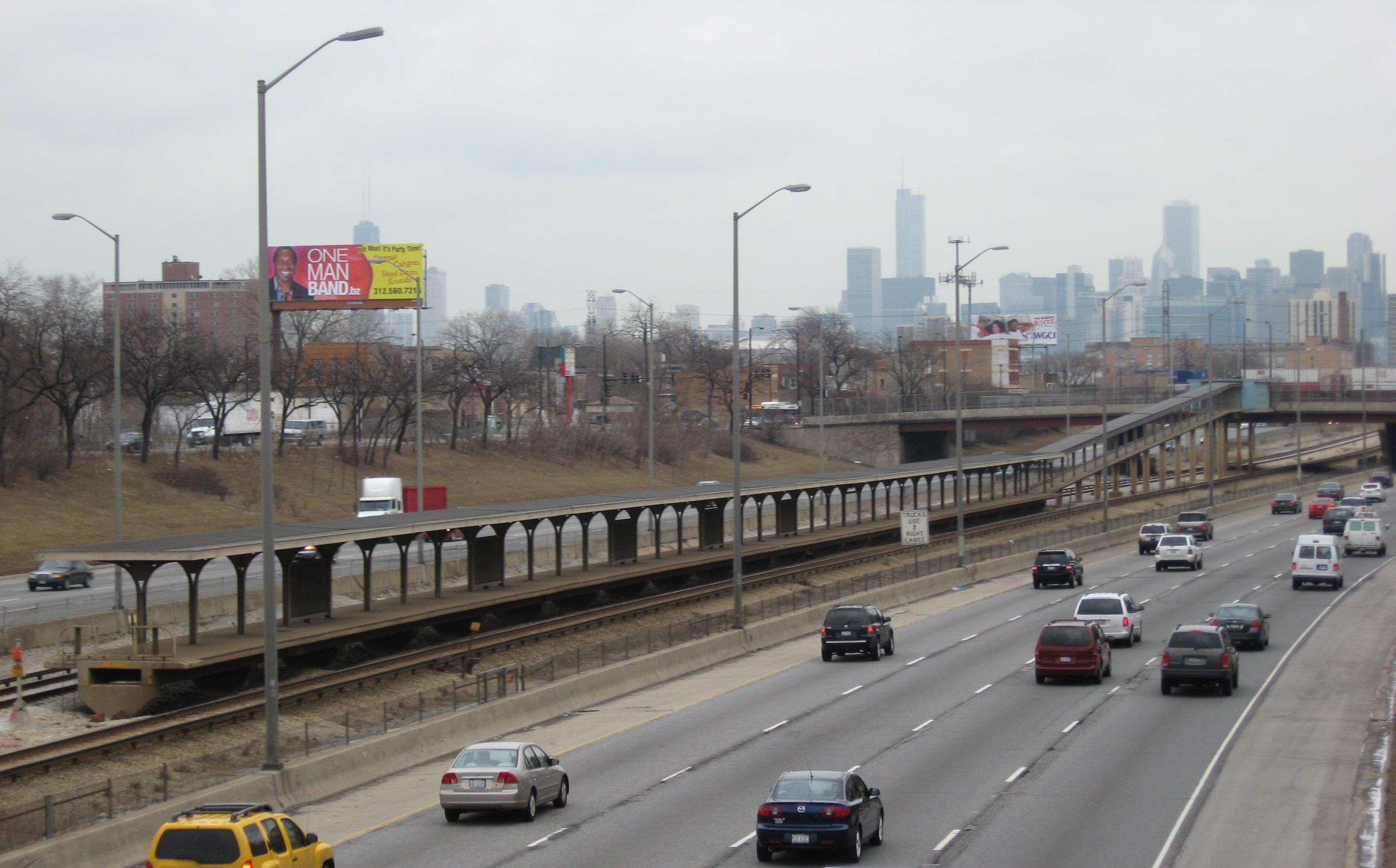
California in the median of I-290

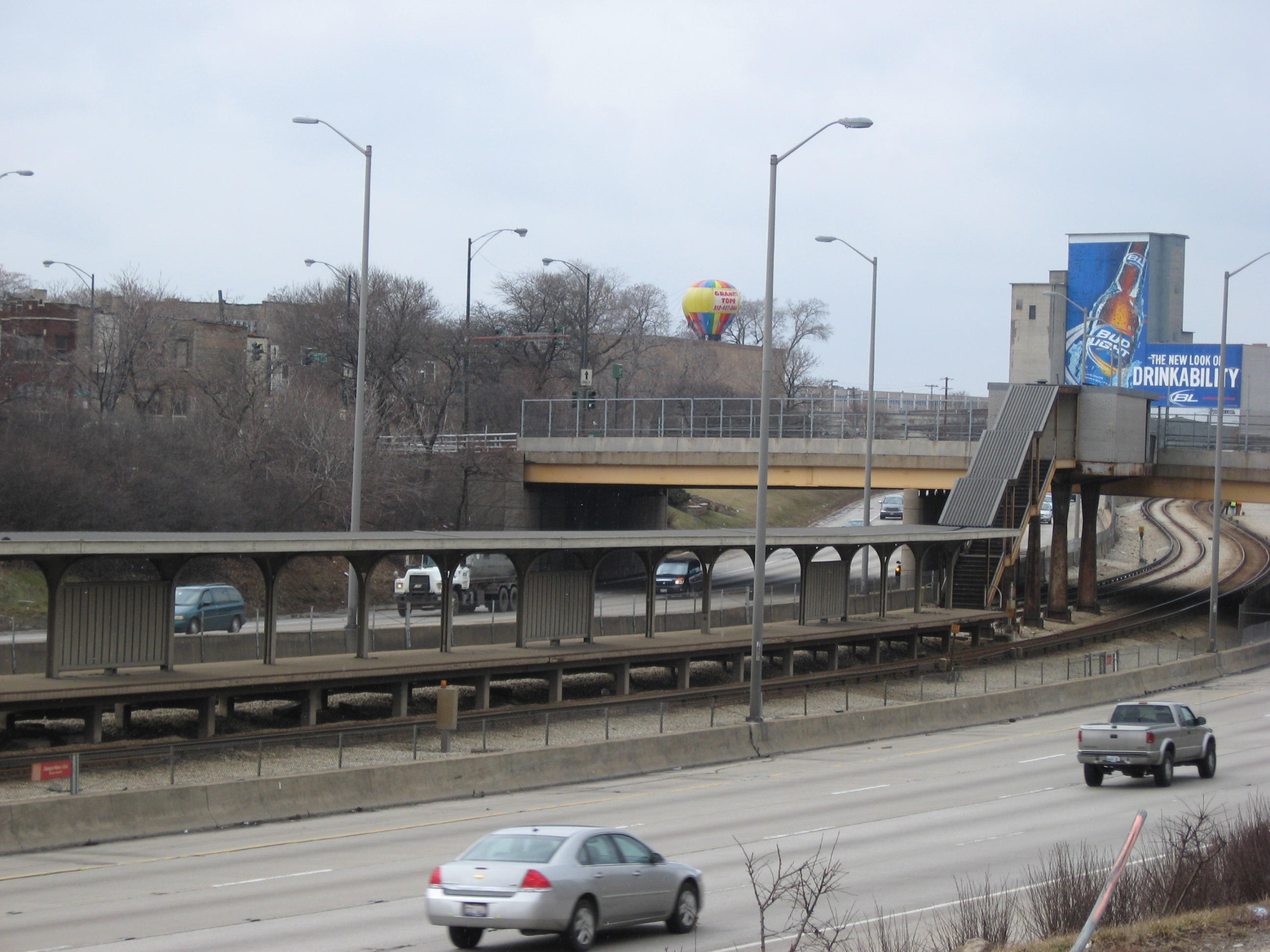
Kostner

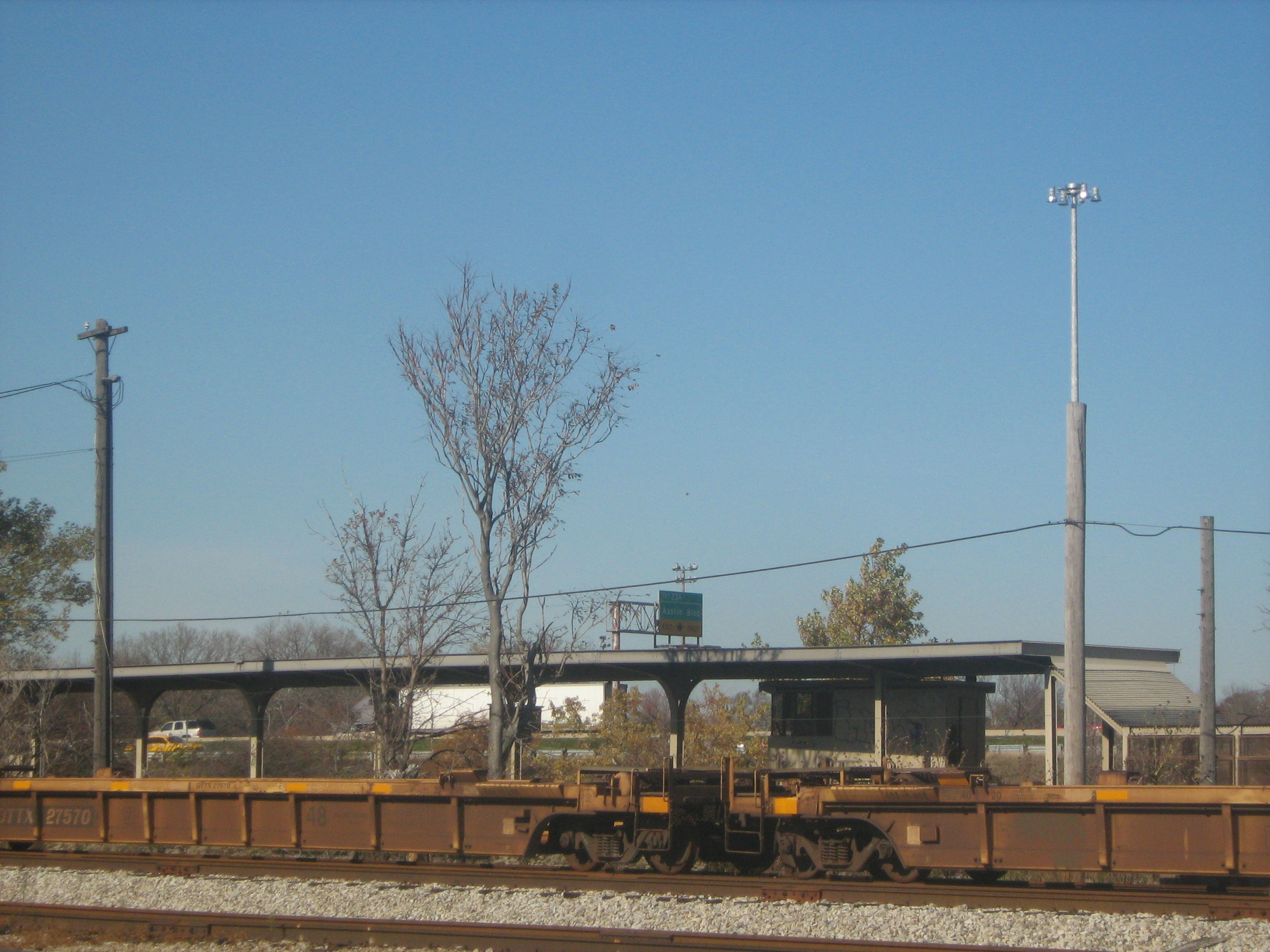
Central

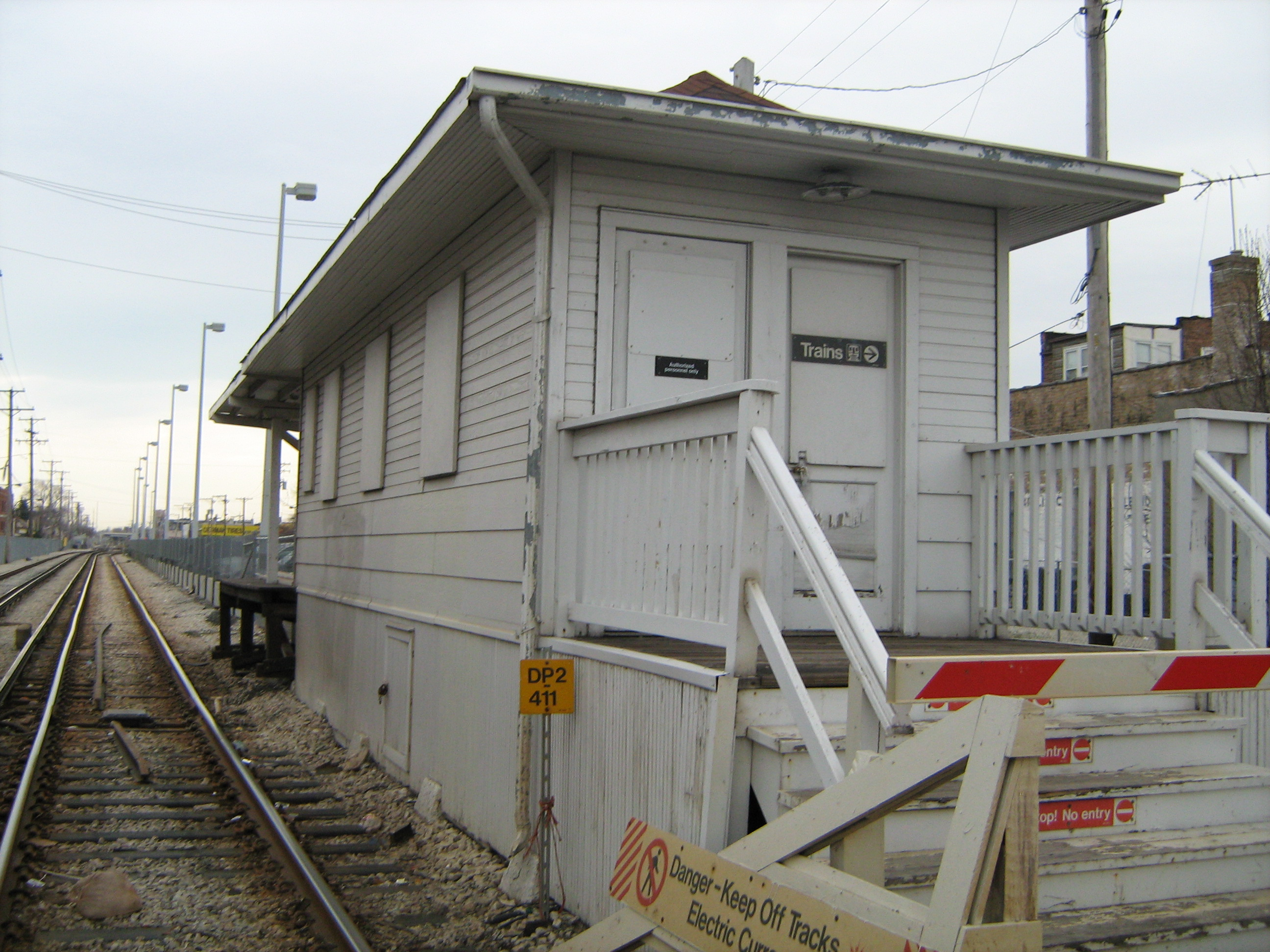
Laramie

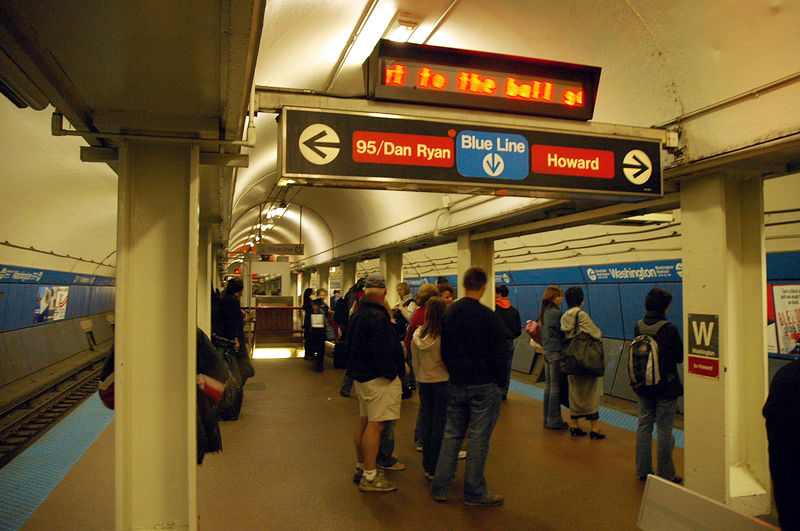
Washington/State station

Station	Branch	Location	Opened	Closed	Status
5th Avenue	Westchester	Maywood	October 1, 1926^{[c]}	December 9, 1951^{[b]}	Demolished
11th Avenue	Westchester	Maywood	October 1, 1926^{[c]}	December 9, 1951^{[b]}	Demolished
14th Place	Douglas	Near West Side	April 28, 1896	December 9, 1951	Demolished
17th Avenue	Westchester	Maywood	October 1, 1926^{[c]}	December 9, 1951^{[b]}	Demolished
18th Street	South Side Elevated	Near South Side	June 6, 1892	August 1, 1949	Demolished
25th Avenue	Westchester	Maywood	October 1, 1926^{[c]}	December 9, 1951^{[b]}	Demolished
26th Street	South Side Elevated	Near South Side	June 6, 1892	August 1, 1949	Demolished
29th Street	South Side Elevated	Douglas	June 6, 1892	August 1, 1949	Demolished
31st Street	South Side Elevated	Douglas	June 6, 1892	August 1, 1949	Demolished
33rd Street	South Side Elevated	Douglas	June 6, 1892	August 1, 1949	Demolished
42nd Place †	Kenwood	Kenwood	September 20, 1907	December 1, 1957	Demolished
50th Avenue	Douglas	Cicero	August 16, 1910	1978	Relocated
58th	South Side Elevated	Washington Park	January 22, 1893	January 9, 1994	Demolished
58th Avenue	Douglas	Cicero	August 1, 1915	February 3, 1952	Demolished
61st	Jackson Park	Washington Park	January 22, 1893	January 9, 1994	Demolished
65th Street	Normal Park	Englewood	May 26, 1907	January 29, 1954	Demolished
69th Street †	Normal Park	Englewood	May 26, 1907	January 29, 1954	Demolished
Armour	Stock Yards	Union Stock Yards	April 8, 1908	October 7, 1957	Demolished
Asbury	Niles Center	Evanston	March 28, 1925	March 27, 1948	Partially demolished
Austin	Douglas	Cicero	August 1, 1915	February 3, 1952	Demolished
Austin	Garfield Park	Oak Park	March 11, 1905^{[c]}	March 18, 1960	Demolished
Bellwood	Westchester	Bellwood	October 1, 1926	December 9, 1951	Demolished
Buena	North Side Main Line	Buena Park	May 31, 1900	August 1, 1949	Demolished
California	Congress	East Garfield Park	June 22, 1958	September 2, 1973	Abandoned
California	Garfield Park	East Garfield Park	June 19, 1895	September 27, 1953	Demolished
California	Humboldt Park	West Town	July 29, 1895	May 4, 1952	Demolished
Calvary	Evanston	Evanston	May 16, 1908^{[d]}	June 30, 1931	Demolished
Campbell	Lake Street	Near West Side	November 6, 1893	April 4, 1948	Demolished
Canal	Lake Street	The Loop	November 6, 1893	October 16, 1909	Demolished
Canal	Metropolitan Main Line	Near West Side	May 6, 1895	June 22, 1958	Demolished
Canterbury	Westchester	Westchester	December 1, 1930	December 9, 1951	Demolished
Central	Congress	Austin	October 10, 1960	September 2, 1973	Abandoned
Central	Douglas	Cicero	August 1, 1912	February 3, 1952	Demolished
Central	Garfield Park	Austin	March 11, 1905^{[c]}	October 11, 1960	Demolished
Chicago	Logan Square	East Village	May 6, 1895	February 25, 1951	Demolished
Cicero	Garfield Park	Austin	June 19, 1895	June 21, 1958	Demolished
Clark	North Side Main Line	Lakeview	June 9, 1900	August 1, 1949	Partially demolished
Congress Terminal †	South Side Elevated	The Loop	June 6, 1892	August 1, 1949^{[a]}	Demolished
Congress/Wabash	South Side Elevated	The Loop	October 18, 1897	August 1, 1949	Demolished
Cottage Grove/Drexel	Kenwood	Kenwood	September 20, 1907	December 1, 1957	Demolished
Crawford-East Prairie	Niles Center	Skokie	March 28, 1925	March 27, 1948	Partially demolished
Dearborn/Van Buren	Loop	The Loop	October 3, 1897	1949	Demolished
Division	Logan Square	Wicker Park	May 6, 1895	February 25, 1951	Demolished
Division	North Side Main Line	Old Town	May 31, 1900	August 1, 1949	Demolished
Dodge	Niles Center	Evanston	March 28, 1925	March 27, 1948	Demolished
Dorchester	Jackson Park	Woodlawn	April 23, 1893	January 13, 1973	Demolished
Douglas Park	Douglas	South Lawndale	June 16, 1902	May 3, 1952	Demolished
Drake	Douglas	North Lawndale	March 10, 1902	December 9, 1951	Demolished
Ellis/Lake Park	Kenwood	Kenwood	September 20, 1907	December 1, 1957	Demolished
Exchange	Stock Yards	Union Stock Yards	April 8, 1908	October 7, 1957	Demolished
Fifth/Lake	Loop	The Loop	September 22, 1895	December 17, 1899	Demolished
Forest Park †	Lake Street	Forest Park	May 20, 1910	October 28, 1962	Demolished
Franklin Terminal †	Metropolitan Main Line	The Loop	May 13, 1895	1897	Demolished
Franklin/Van Buren	Metropolitan Main Line	The Loop	October 11, 1897	October 11, 1955	Demolished
Garfield Park	Garfield Park	West Garfield Park	June 19, 1895	September 20, 1953	Demolished
Grace	North Side Main Line	Wrigleyville	June 7, 1900	August 1, 1949	Demolished
Grand	Logan Square	Near West Side	May 6, 1895	February 25, 1951	Demolished
Grand	North Side Main Line	Near North Side	1921	September 20, 1970	Demolished
Gunderson	Garfield Park	Oak Park	March 11, 1905^{[c]}	1957	Demolished
Halsted	Lake Street	Near West Side	November 6, 1893	January 9, 1994	Demolished
Halsted	Metropolitan Main Line	Near West Side	May 6, 1895	1958	Demolished
Halsted	North Side Main Line	Lincoln Park	May 31, 1900	August 1, 1949	Demolished
Halsted	Stock Yards	New City	April 8, 1908	October 7, 1957	Demolished
Hamlin	Lake Street	West Garfield Park	January 1894	March 18, 1956	Demolished
Hannah	Garfield Park	Forest Park	March 11, 1905^{[c]}	September 14, 1952	Demolished
Harlem	Garfield Park	Forest Park	March 11, 1905^{[c]}	March 19, 1960	Demolished
Harrison	Westchester	Bellwood	October 1, 1926	December 9, 1951	Demolished
Harvard	Englewood	Englewood	November 3, 1906	February 9, 1992	Demolished
Homan	Douglas	North Lawndale	March 10, 1902	December 9, 1951	Demolished
Homan	Lake Street	East Garfield Park	November 6, 1893	January 9, 1994	Demolished
Home	Garfield Park	Oak Park	March 11, 1905^{[c]}	September 20, 1953	Demolished
Hoyne	Garfield Park	Near West Side	June 19, 1895	September 27, 1953	Demolished
Humboldt Park	Humboldt Park	Humboldt Park	November 11, 1902	May 4, 1952	Demolished
Isabella	Evanston	Evanston	April 1, 1912	July 16, 1973	Demolished
Jackson Park †	Jackson Park	Jackson Park	May 12, 1893	October 31, 1893	Demolished
Jackson Park †	Jackson Park	Woodlawn	May 12, 1893	March 4, 1982	Demolished
Kenton	Douglas	North Lawndale	May 22, 1907	December 9, 1951	Demolished
Kedzie	Garfield Park	East Garfield Park	June 19, 1895	June 21, 1958	Demolished
Kedzie	Humboldt Park	Humboldt Park	July 29, 1895	May 4, 1952	Demolished
Kilbourn	Garfield Park	West Garfield Park	June 19, 1895	June 21, 1958	Demolished
Kinzie	North Side Main Line	Near North Side	May 31, 1900	1921	Demolished
Kostner	Congress	West Garfield Park	August 5, 1962	September 2, 1973	Abandoned
Kostner	Lake Street	West Garfield Park	March 1894	April 4, 1948	Demolished
Kostner	Niles Center	Skokie	March 28, 1925	March 27, 1948	Demolished
Laflin	Metropolitan Main Line	Near West Side	May 6, 1895	December 9, 1951	Demolished
Lake Street Transfer Ⓣ	Logan Square; Lake Street	Near West Side	May 6, 1895	February 25, 1951	Demolished
Laramie	Douglas	Cicero	August 16, 1910	August 16, 2003	Closed
Laramie †	Garfield Park	Austin	August 25, 1902	June 21, 1958	Demolished
Larrabee	North Side Main Line	Cabrini–Green	June 6, 1900	August 1, 1949	Demolished
Lawndale	Douglas	North Lawndale	March 10, 1902	December 9, 1951	Demolished
Lawndale †	Humboldt Park	Humboldt Park	July 29, 1895	May 4, 1952	Demolished
Logan Square	Logan Square	Logan Square	May 25, 1895	February 1, 1970	Demolished
Lombard	Douglas	Cicero	August 1, 1915	February 3, 1952	Demolished
Lombard	Garfield Park	Oak Park	March 11, 1905^{[c]}	September 20, 1953	Demolished
Lombard	Lake Street	Oak Park	January 25, 1901	April 4, 1948	Demolished
Loomis †	Englewood	Englewood	July 13, 1907	1969	Demolished
Loomis	Lake Street	Near West Side	November 6, 1893	April 4, 1954	Demolished
Madison	Logan Square	Near West Side	May 6, 1895	February 25, 1951	Demolished
Madison/Wabash	Loop	The Loop	November 8, 1896	March 16, 2015	Demolished
Madison/Wells	Loop	The Loop	October 3, 1897	January 30, 1994	Demolished
Main	Niles Center	Skokie	March 28, 1925	March 27, 1948	Demolished
Mannheim/22nd †	Westchester	Westchester	December 1, 1930	December 9, 1951	Demolished
Marion	Lake Street	Oak Park	January 25, 1901	October 28, 1962	Demolished
Market Terminal †	Market	The Loop	November 6, 1893	April 4, 1948	Demolished
Marquette Road	Normal Park	Englewood	May 26, 1907	January 29, 1954	Demolished
Marshfield	Metropolitan Main Line	Near West Side	May 6, 1895	April 4, 1954	Demolished
Menard	Lake Street	Austin	April 15, 1899	April 4, 1948	Demolished
North Water Terminal †	North Side Main Line	Near North Side	November 17, 1908	August 1, 1949	Demolished
Oak	North Side Main Line	Near North Side	1906	August 1, 1949	Demolished
Oak Park †	Douglas	Berwyn	March 16, 1924	February 3, 1952	Demolished
Oak Park	Garfield Park	Oak Park	March 11, 1905^{[c]}	March 19, 1960	Demolished
Oakley	Lake Street	Near West Side	circa 1893–94	April 4, 1948	Demolished
Ogden	Garfield Park	Near West Side	June 19, 1895	September 27, 1953	Demolished
Packers	Stock Yards	Union Stock Yards	April 8, 1908	October 7, 1957	Demolished
Parnell	Englewood	Englewood	December 24, 1906	August 1, 1949	Demolished
Pershing	South Side Elevated	Douglas	June 6, 1892	August 1, 1949	Demolished
Princeton	Englewood	Englewood	December 10, 1905	August 1, 1949	Demolished
Pulaski	Garfield Park	West Garfield Park	June 19, 1895	June 22, 1958	Demolished
Racine	Englewood	Englewood	February 25, 1907	January 9, 1994	Abandoned
Racine	Lake Street	Near West Side	November 6, 1893	April 4, 1948	Demolished
Racine	Metropolitan Main Line	Near West Side	May 6, 1895	April 4, 1954	Demolished
Racine	Stock Yards	Union Stock Yards	April 8, 1908	October 7, 1957	Demolished
Randolph/Market	Market	The Loop	November 1893	April 4, 1948	Demolished
Randolph/Wabash	Loop	The Loop	November 8, 1896	September 3, 2017	Demolished
Randolph/Wells Ⓣ	Loop	The Loop	October 3, 1897	July 17, 1995	Partially demolished
Ravenswood	Ravenswood	Ravenswood	May 18, 1907	August 1, 1949	Demolished
Ridge	Niles Center	Evanston	March 28, 1925	March 27, 1948	Demolished
Ridgeland	Douglas	Berwyn	March 16, 1924	February 3, 1952	Demolished
Ridgeland	Garfield Park	Oak Park	September 6, 1957	March 20, 1960	Demolished
Roosevelt	Douglas	Near West Side	April 28, 1896	May 3, 1952	Demolished
Roosevelt	Westchester	Westchester	October 1, 1926	December 9, 1951	Demolished
Sacramento	Lake Street	East Garfield Park	March 1894	April 4, 1948	Demolished
Sacramento	Garfield Park	East Garfield Park	June 19, 1895	June 10, 1952	Demolished
Schiller	North Side Main Line	Old Town	May 31, 1900	August 1, 1949	Demolished
South Parkway	Kenwood	Kenwood	September 20, 1907	December 1, 1957	Demolished
St. Louis	Garfield Park	East Garfield Park	June 19, 1895	June 21, 1958	Demolished
St. Louis	Humboldt Park	Humboldt Park	July 29, 1895	May 4, 1952	Demolished
State	Englewood	Washington Park	November 3, 1905	September 2, 1973	Demolished
Swift	Stock Yards	Union Stock Yards	April 8, 1908	October 7, 1957	Demolished
Tripp	Garfield Park	West Garfield Park	June 19, 1895	June 21, 1958	Demolished
University †	Jackson Park	Woodlawn	April 23, 1893	January 9, 1994	Demolished
Vincennes	Kenwood	Kenwood	September 20, 1907	December 1, 1957	Demolished
Wallace	Stock Yards	New City	April 8, 1908	May 3, 1952	Demolished
Washington Ⓣ	State Street Subway	The Loop	October 17, 1943	October 23, 2006	Closed
Webster	North Side Main Line	Lincoln Park	June 9, 1900	August 1, 1949	Demolished
Wells Street Terminal †	Metropolitan Main Line	The Loop	October 3, 1904	December 9, 1951^{[b]}	Demolished
Wentworth	Englewood	Englewood	December 10, 1905	February 9, 1992	Partially demolished
Western	Garfield Park	Near West Side	June 19, 1895	September 27, 1953	Demolished
Western	Humboldt Park	Bucktown	July 29, 1895	May 4, 1952	Demolished
Willow	North Side Main Line	Lincoln Park	1905	May 17, 1942	Demolished
Wood	Douglas	Lower West Side	April 28, 1896	May 19, 1957	Demolished
Wood	Lake Street	Near West Side	November 6, 1893	November 1913	Demolished
Wrightwood	North Side Main Line	Lincoln Park	May 31, 1900	August 1, 1949	Demolished

== Reopened stations ==
Station	Line	Opened	Closed	Reopened
Ashland Ⓣ	Green Pink	November 6, 1893	April 4, 1948	February 25, 1951
California	Green	November 6, 1893	February 9, 1992	July 13, 1996
Cermak–McCormick Place	Green	June 6, 1892	September 9, 1977	February 8, 2015
Damen	Green	November 6, 1893	April 4, 1948	August 5, 2024
Dempster–Skokie †	Yellow	March 28, 1925	March 27, 1948^{[a]}	April 20, 1964
Grand	Blue	February 25, 1951	February 9, 1992	June 25, 1999
Harold Washington Library–State/Van Buren Ⓣ	Brown Orange Pink Purple	October 3, 1897	September 2, 1973	June 22, 1997
Morgan	Green Pink	November 6, 1893	April 4, 1948	May 18, 2012
Oakton–Skokie	Yellow	March 28, 1925	March 27, 1948	April 30, 2012
Paulina	Brown	May 18, 1907	September 2, 1973	October 17, 1973
Roosevelt Ⓣ	Green Orange	June 6, 1892	August 1, 1949^{[a]}	November 1, 1993
Sedgwick	Brown Purple	May 31, 1900	January 13, 1973	April 23, 1973

== Notes ==
- ^{a} Station remained in service on the North Shore Line after the "L" withdrew service.
- ^{b} Station remained in service on the Chicago Aurora and Elgin after the "L" withdrew service.
- ^{c} Station opened on the Aurora Elgin and Chicago Railway prior to the start of "L" service. March 11, 1905, is the day "L" service began at this station.
- ^{d} Station opened on the Milwaukee Road's Evanston branch prior to the start of "L" service. May 16, 1908, is the day "L" service began at this station.
