= Princeton station (CTA) =

PRINCETON 6100S 200W
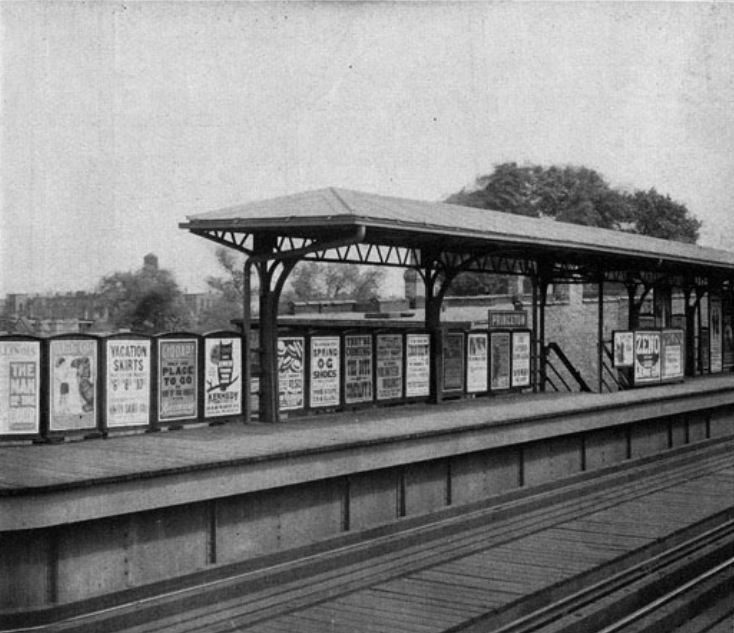
- One of the platforms in the 1910s

General information
- Location: South Princeton Avenue and West 61st Street; Chicago, Illinois
- Coordinates: 41.78362°N 87.63213°W
- Owner: Chicago Transit Authority
- Line: Englewood branch
- Platforms: 2 side platforms
- Tracks: 2 tracks

Construction
- Structure type: Elevated

History
- Opened: January 11, 1906
- Closed: July 31, 1949

Former services
Preceding station	Chicago "L"	Following station
Harvard toward Loomis	Englewood branch	Wentworth toward 58th
Location

Princeton was a station on the Chicago Transit Authority's Englewood branch, which is now part of the Green Line. The station was located at South Princeton Avenue and West 61st Street in the Englewood neighborhood of Chicago. Princeton opened on January 11, 1906, and closed on July 31, 1949.
