= Parnell station =

PARNELL 6300S 500W
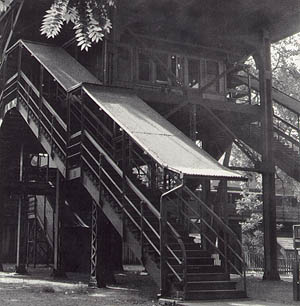
- The mezzanine-level station house in 1924

General information
- Location: South Parnell Avenue and 63rd Place; Chicago, Illinois
- Coordinates: 41.77914°N 87.63921°W
- Owner: Chicago Transit Authority
- Line: Englewood branch
- Platforms: 2 side platforms
- Tracks: 2 tracks
- Connections: Englewood station (C&WI)

Construction
- Structure type: Elevated

History
- Opened: December 24, 1906
- Closed: August 1, 1949

Former services
Preceding station	Chicago "L"	Following station
Halsted toward Loomis	Englewood branch	Harvard toward 58th
Location

Parnell was a station on the Chicago Transit Authority's Englewood branch, which is now part of the Green Line. The station was located at South Parnell Avenue and 63rd Place, in the Englewood neighborhood of Chicago. Parnell had a direct platform connection to the adjacent Chicago and Western Indiana Railroad station. Parnell opened on December 24, 1906, and closed on July 31, 1949.
