= State station (CTA) =

State 5900S 1E

General information
- Location: 5913–15 S. State Street; Washington Park, Chicago, Illinois
- Coordinates: 41.78691°N 87.62549°W
- Owner: Chicago Transit Authority
- Line: Englewood Branch
- Platforms: 2 side platforms
- Tracks: 2

Construction
- Structure type: Elevated

History
- Opened: November 3, 1905
- Closed: September 2, 1973

Former services
Preceding station	Chicago "L"	Following station
Wentworth toward Ashland	Englewood branch	58th toward Howard
Location

State was a station on the Englewood Branch of the Chicago "L". The station opened on November 3, 1905 and closed on September 2, 1973 as part of a group of budget-related CTA station closings.
