= Ashland Yard =

Chicago "L" rail yard

The Ashland Yard is an elevated CTA rail yard in the Englewood neighborhood on the South Side of Chicago, Illinois, which stores cars from the Green Line of the Chicago Transit Authority. Currently, 5000-series railcars are stored here. It is adjacent to Ashland/63rd station.
