= Normal Park branch =

Segment of the Chicago "L" (1907–1954)

Overview
- Status: Closed
- Locale: Chicago, Illinois, U.S.
- Termini: Harvard; 69th
- Stations: 4

Service
- Type: Rapid transit
- System: Chicago 'L'
- Operator(s): Chicago Transit Authority (1947–1954); Chicago Rapid Transit Company (1924–1947); South Side Elevated Railroad (1907–1924)

History
- Opened: May 25, 1907; 119 years ago
- Closed: January 29, 1954; 72 years ago

Technical
- Line length: 0.85 mi (1.37 km)
- Character: Elevated
- Track gauge: 4 ft 8 1/2 in (1,435 mm)
- Electrification: Third rail, 600 V DC

The Normal Park branch was a rapid transit line which was part of the Chicago "L" system from 1907 to 1954. The branch served the Englewood neighborhood of Chicago and consisted of four elevated stations. It opened on May 25, 1907, and closed on January 29, 1954.

== Operations ==
The Normal Park branch was a 0.85-mile (1.37 km) elevated line which served four stations. The branch began at the Harvard station, which served a transfer point to the Englewood Branch, and ran southwestward toward the branch's terminal at 69th and Parnell. The branch generally ran only single-car trains, although two-car trains were occasionally run during weekday rush hours. The branch separated from the Englewood branch at Stewart Junction, west of the Harvard station. Although ridership was low, the stations had enough capacity for 8-car trains, rare around the CTA during that time period. The vast majority of the line's traffic came from the terminal at 69th; the Chicago Normal School was located in this area, along with a small commercial district.

Ridership had always been low on this line: There was very little passenger traffic between Harvard and the 69th St. terminal. By the time the branch was closed in January 1954, it was a shuttle only service between Harvard and 69th. Most of the intermediate stations had been gutted before, and 69th St. station was halfway locked down. The line was completely torn down around Summer 1954.

When the Dan Ryan branch (serving the Red Line) was built from 1967 to 1969, a brand new 69th station was built a half-mile away from the former Normal Park station. While the original 69th St. was a low ridership station, the new 69th St. is one of the busiest stations on the CTA system.

== Station listing ==
Normal Park branch stations
Station	Location	Notes
Harvard	Harvard Avenue and 63rd Street	
65th Street	65th Street and Stewart Avenue	
Marquette Road	Marquette Road and Stewart Avenue	
69th Street	69th Street and Parnell Avenue	Replaced by 69th

== See also ==
- Englewood Branch
