= Racine Avenue =

Street in Chicago

- Center Avenue; 1200 West
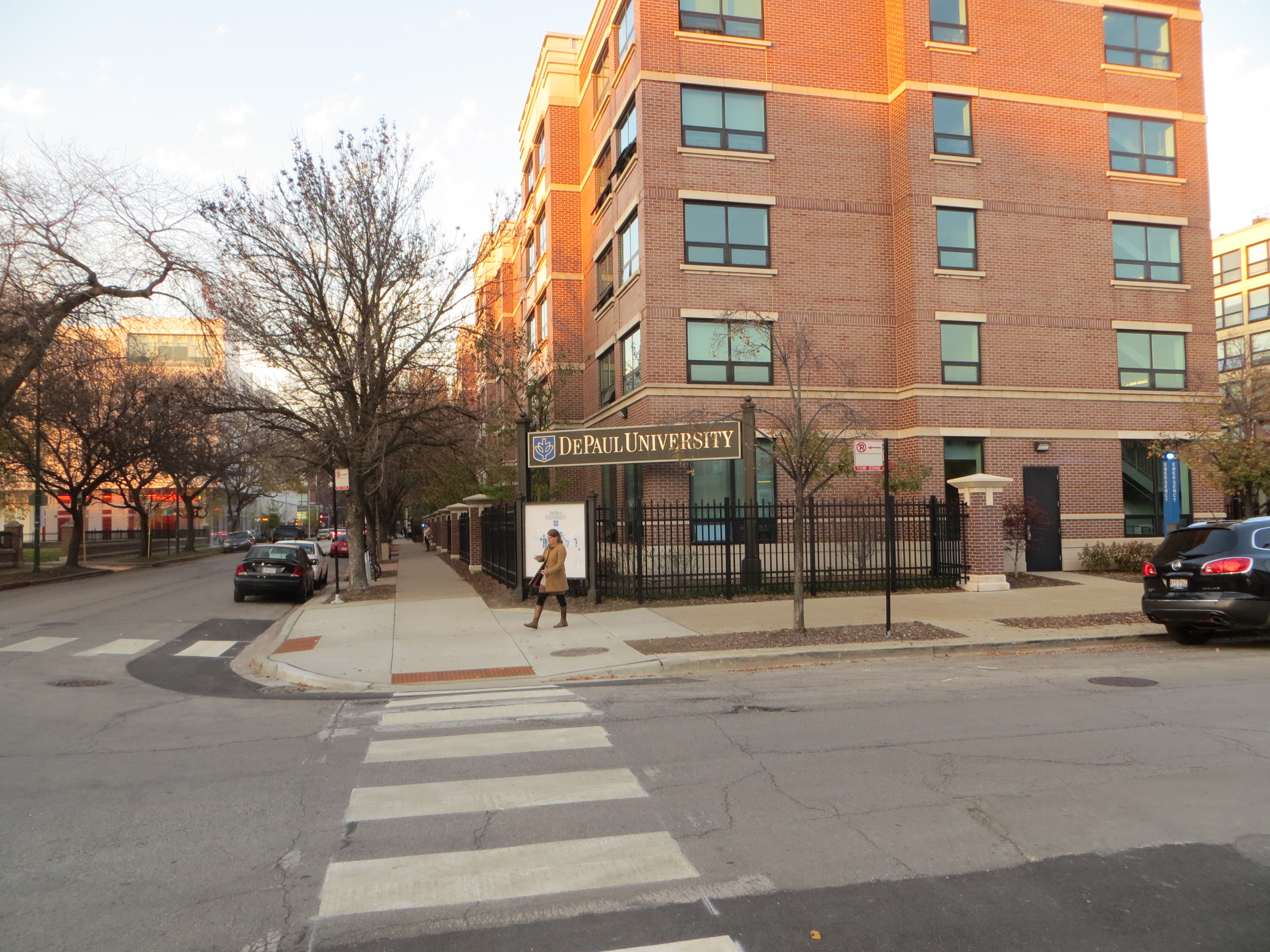
- Racine Avenue at Belden Avenue in DePaul University campus
- Former name: Center Avenue
- Location: Beecher, Calumet Park, Chicago
- South end: Corning Road near Beecher
- North end: Broadway in Chicago

Racine Avenue is a street in Chicago, in whose grid system it is 1200 W. It is 1.5 miles (2.4 km) west of State Street, the baseline of the grid. Racine Avenue was previously designated as Center Avenue south of the North Branch Chicago River; however, most of the south suburbs retained the old name.

== Transportation ==
Racine Avenue is served by two train lines: Racine Avenue station on the Blue Island branch of the Metra Electric District line and Racine station on the Blue Line. The Green Line Englewood branch notably served Racine Avenue prior to its indefinite closure in 1994.

CTA bus route 44 runs along Racine Avenue from 87th Street to 47th Street before turning east and north toward Halsted station via Halsted Street, Wallace Street, Canal Street, and Archer Avenue. In the Near West Side, CTA bus route 60 runs along Racine Avenue from Blue Island Avenue to Harrison Street.
