= Polk station =

Rapid transit station in Chicago

Polk 800S 1700W
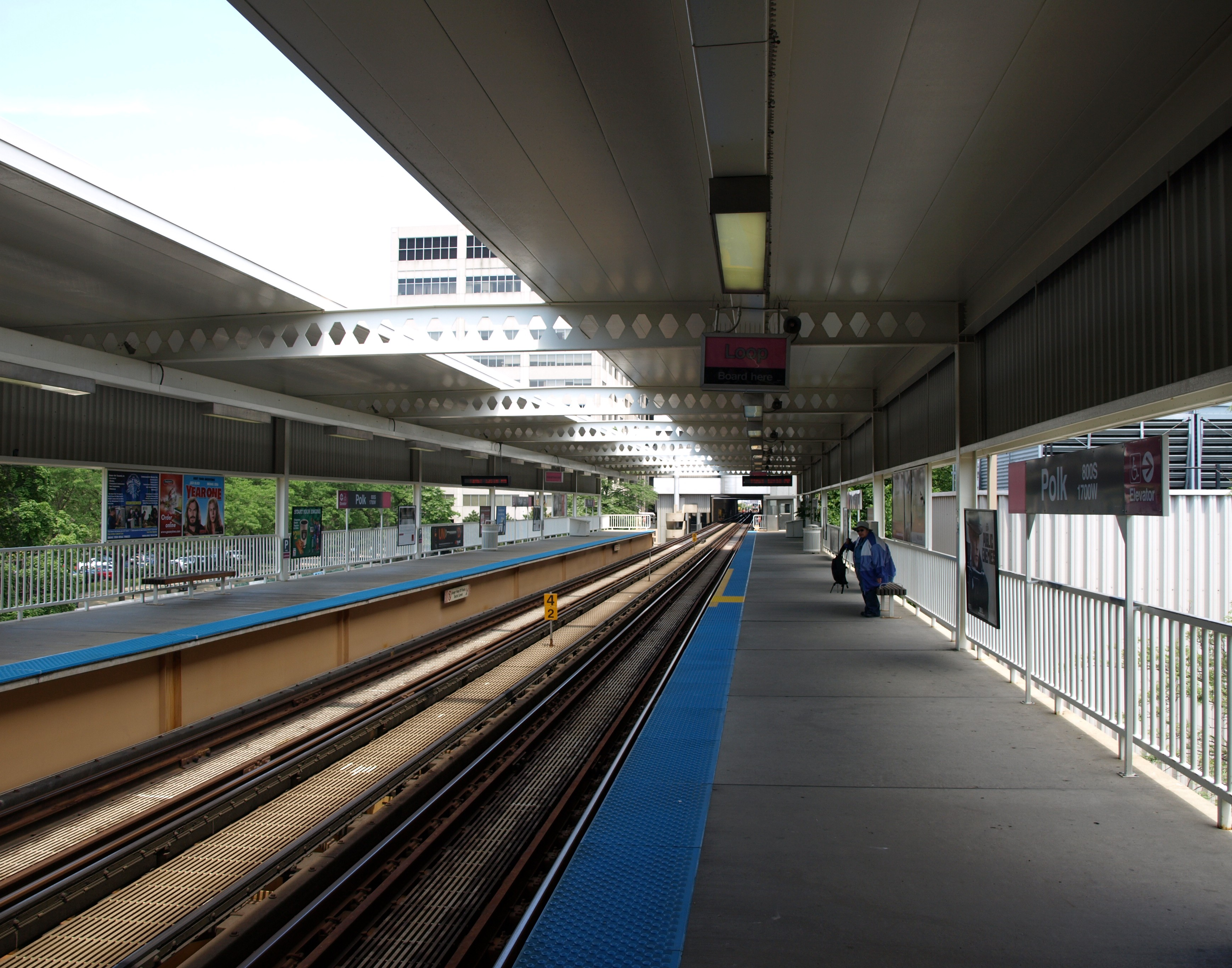

General information
- Location: 1713 West Polk Street; Chicago, Illinois 60612
- Coordinates: 41.871551°N 87.66953°W
- Owner: Chicago Transit Authority
- Line: Cermak branch
- Platforms: 2 side platforms
- Tracks: 2

Construction
- Structure type: Elevated
- Cycle facilities: Yes
- Accessible: Yes

History
- Opened: April 28, 1896; 130 years ago
- Rebuilt: 1983; 43 years ago

Passengers
- 2025: 680,411 ▲5.1%

Services
Preceding station	Chicago "L"	Following station
18th toward 54th/Cermak	Pink Line	Ashland toward Loop (Clark/Lake)
Former services
Preceding station	Chicago "L"	Following station
18th toward 54th/Cermak	Blue Line Cermak branch	Racine toward O'Hare
Roosevelt Closed 1952 toward Oak Park	Douglas branch	Marshfield Closed 1954 Terminus
Track layout
Location

Polk is an 'L' station on the Pink Line of the Chicago Transit Authority. It is adjacent to Rush University Medical Center and the University of Illinois Chicago College of Dentistry within the Illinois Medical District in the Near West Side community area. It formerly served as a transfer station between the Pink and Blue Lines from June 25, 2006 to April 25, 2008.

== History ==
Polk Station opened on April 28, 1896, as part of the Metropolitan West Side Elevated Railroad's Douglas Park branch. In 1983 the original station was demolished and rebuilt. A Dunkin' Donuts was added to the station in September 2004.

== Bus connections ==
CTA

- 7 Harrison (weekdays only)
- 157 Streeterville/Taylor (weekdays only)

Pace

- 755 Plainfield/IMD Express (weekday rush hours only)
