= Humboldt Park branch =

Segment of the Chicago "L" (1895–1952)

Overview
- Status: Closed
- Locale: Chicago, Illinois, U.S.
- Termini: Damen; Lawndale
- Stations: 6

Service
- Type: Rapid transit
- System: Chicago 'L'
- Operator(s): Chicago Transit Authority (1947–1952); Chicago Rapid Transit Company (1924–1947); Metropolitan West Side Elevated Railroad (1895–1924)

History
- Opened: July 29, 1895; 130 years ago
- Closed: May 4, 1952; 74 years ago

Technical
- Line length: 2.09 mi (3.36 km)
- Character: Elevated
- Track gauge: 4 ft 8 1/2 in (1,435 mm)
- Electrification: Third rail, 600 V DC
Route map
Humboldt Park branch highlighted in gray

The Humboldt Park branch was a rapid transit line which was part of the Chicago "L" system from 1895 to 1952. The branch served the West Town and the Humboldt Park neighborhoods of Chicago and consisted of six elevated stations. It opened on July 29, 1895, and closed on May 4, 1952.

== Operations ==
The Humboldt Park branch was a 2.09-mile (3.36 km) elevated line which served six stations. The branch separated from the Logan Square branch northwest of the Damen station (originally called Robey), and ended at the Lawndale terminus. It ran immediately north of North Avenue between Hoyne Avenue and Lawndale Avenue.

== History ==
The Humboldt Park branch had initially been intended to run to Harlem Avenue, a length of 6.5-mile (10.5 km), although this never came to be due to that area being less developed in 1895, and Lawndale Avenue remained the branch's terminus for the duration of the branch's existence. The Humboldt Park branch initially had only five stops, until 1902 when a sixth stop opened at Humboldt Park Boulevard. In 1906, the Chicago city council approved the Met's proposal to extend the branch westward to Harlem Avenue, running on an elevated structure to 52nd Avenue and then at ground level from there to Harlem Avenue, but construction was never implemented, even though said extension likely would have given the branch the ridership levels needed to maintain service after 1952.

For the larger part of its service life, the Humboldt Park Branch was operated as a shuttle between Damen and Lawndale. For the first ten years, until 1904 when the Met converted their trains to multiple-unit operation, Humboldt trains only ran downtown via the Paulina Connector and Marshfield Junction during rush hours. Late night service operated as single car shuttles on the branch, and during off-peak hours, motor cars pushed trailers to Damen that were then coupled onto Logan Square trains for the trip downtown, and the process reversed on the outbound trip.

In 1930, during the Great Depression, all stations on the Met branches were lengthened to accommodate eight car trains, including the Humboldt branch. During off-peak hours, the procedure of coupling Humboldt cars to Logan Square trains at Damen continued. During rush hours, Logan Square and Humboldt trains ran downtown, providing skip-stop service between Damen and Marshfield Junction.

=== Abandonment ===
The beginning of the end for the Humboldt Park branch was in 1947 when the CTA was formed to take over from the ailing Chicago Rapid Transit. Compared to their predecessor, the CTA intended to change things by adjusting the 'L' services to adapt to changing ridership patterns. The Humboldt Park branch was one line that they targeted for abandonment as early as 1949, but political pressure forced them to hold off.

In August 1948, the CTA discontinued the practice of coupling Humboldt cars to Logan Square trains at Damen. Effective August 29, off-peak Humboldt Park service was reduced to a shuttle between Damen and Lawndale. To provide a timed transfer to Logan Square trains to downtown, Humboldt cars were scheduled to arrive right before Loop-bound Logan Square trains, discharge and board new passengers, then cross back over to the outbound track and return to the branch. Rush hour through service was retained, although now all Logan Square trains serviced the Loop while Humboldt trains terminated at Wells Street Terminal.

The 1950s brought bigger changes that would lead to the branch's abandonment. The first was on February 19, 1950, when the CTA discontinued evening and owl service. While minor, a bigger change happened in December of that year when the Logan Square branch was re-equipped with the 6000-series cars, whereas the Humboldt branch continued to use older wood cars. This led to a decline in Humboldt ridership as passengers preferred to go to Logan Square to ride trains with the newer cars.

In 1951, the CTA made plans to close the Humboldt Park branch alongside the rerouting of Logan Square trains into the Milwaukee-Dearborn Subway. However, protests by aldermen and local residents pressured the CTA into keeping the branch in operation. Regardless, the opening of the subway on February 25 was the nail in the coffin for the Humboldt Park Branch. All Logan Square trains were rerouted via the subway, while the elevated tracks from Evergreen Junction (where the subway portal is located) to Marshfield Junction were taken out of revenue operation. As wooden cars were forbidden from operating in the subway due to fire safety concerns, Humboldt Park service was cut off from downtown, and reduced to a full-time Lawndale-Damen shuttle. In the interest of efficiency, the Humboldt trains no longer discharged passengers onto the inbound platform at Damen for a same-platform transfer to the Logan Square branch, but instead now boarded and discharged at a new temporary platform that was constructed over the inbound trackway at the junction where the two branches met, with a new walkway being built at track level to connect the shuttle platform to the inbound platform on the main line. At Damen Junction, the tracks were reconfigured with a spring-and-return switch that merged the eastbound and westbound tracks just before the shuttle platform.

With ridership declines, and in spite of protests, service on the Humboldt Park branch ended on May 4, 1952. The line was demolished in 1953 from Lawndale terminal to Oakley Avenue. A three block stub between the Congress-Milwaukee tracks and Oakley Avenue remained intact for car storage including the shuttle platform until the late 1960s, when the Paulina Connector tracks from Evergreen Portal to Lake Street were demolished. Remnants of the junction were still visible in the structure at North Avenue until 1996 when the spans were replaced as part of renovation work on the Blue Line.

== Station listing ==
Humboldt Park branch stations
Station	Location
Western	Western Avenue and North Avenue
California	California Avenue and North Avenue
Humboldt Park	Humboldt Blvd. and North Avenue
Kedzie	Kedzie Avenue and North Avenue
St. Louis (originally Ballou)	St. Louis Avenue and North Avenue
Lawndale	Lawndale Avenue and North Avenue
