= Western station (CTA Humboldt Park branch) =

Former rapid transit station

WESTERN 2400W 1600N

General information
- Coordinates: 41.91084°N 87.68722°W
- Owner: Chicago Transit Authority (1947–1952); Chicago Rapid Transit Company (1924–1947); See text before 1924
- Line: Humboldt Park branch
- Platforms: 2 Side platforms
- Tracks: 2

Construction
- Structure type: Elevated

History
- Opened: May 6, 1895
- Closed: 1952

Former services
Preceding station	Chicago "L"	Following station
California toward Lawndale	Humboldt Park branch	Damen Terminus
Location

Western was a rapid transit station on the Chicago "L", serving the Humboldt Park branch of its Metropolitan West Side Elevated Railroad. It opened in 1895 and closed in 1952.

== History ==
The Metropolitan West Side Elevated Railroad Company was granted a 50-year franchise by the Chicago City Council on April 7, 1892, and began securing right of way shortly thereafter. As designed, the Metropolitan's operations would comprise a main line that went west from downtown to Marshfield, where three branches – one northwest to Logan Square, one due west to Garfield Park, and one southwest to Douglas Park – would diverge and serve various parts of Chicago's west side. A further branch to Humboldt Park would proceed due west from the Logan Square branch just past Robey station. (Note: Technically, the Logan Square branch started after Robey and was, like the Humboldt Park branch, a divergence from what was formally known as the "Northwest branch". However, as early as 1898, even the Metropolitan itself was referring to the Northwest branch as part of the "Logan Square branch".) Unlike the competing South Side and Lake Street Elevateds, the Metropolitan never used steam traction; although it had originally intended to, and indeed had built much of its structure under the assumption that locomotives would be used, it decided in May 1894 to have electrified tracks instead, making it upon its opening the first electric elevated railroad in the United States.

The Metropolitan's tracks by the site of the future Robey station were finished by the middle of October 1894, and were powered on in April 1895 for test and inspection runs. The Metropolitan began service at 6 a.m. on Monday, May 6, 1895, between Robey on the Logan Square branch and Canal on the main line. The Logan Square branch was extended past Robey to Logan Square on May 25, and the Humboldt Park branch opened on July 29.

On December 10, 1929, a messenger for a tailoring company was robbed of $2,100 ($33,100 in 2021) while about to enter the station en route to downtown.

The station closed with the rest of the Humboldt Park branch on May 4, 1952.

== Station details ==
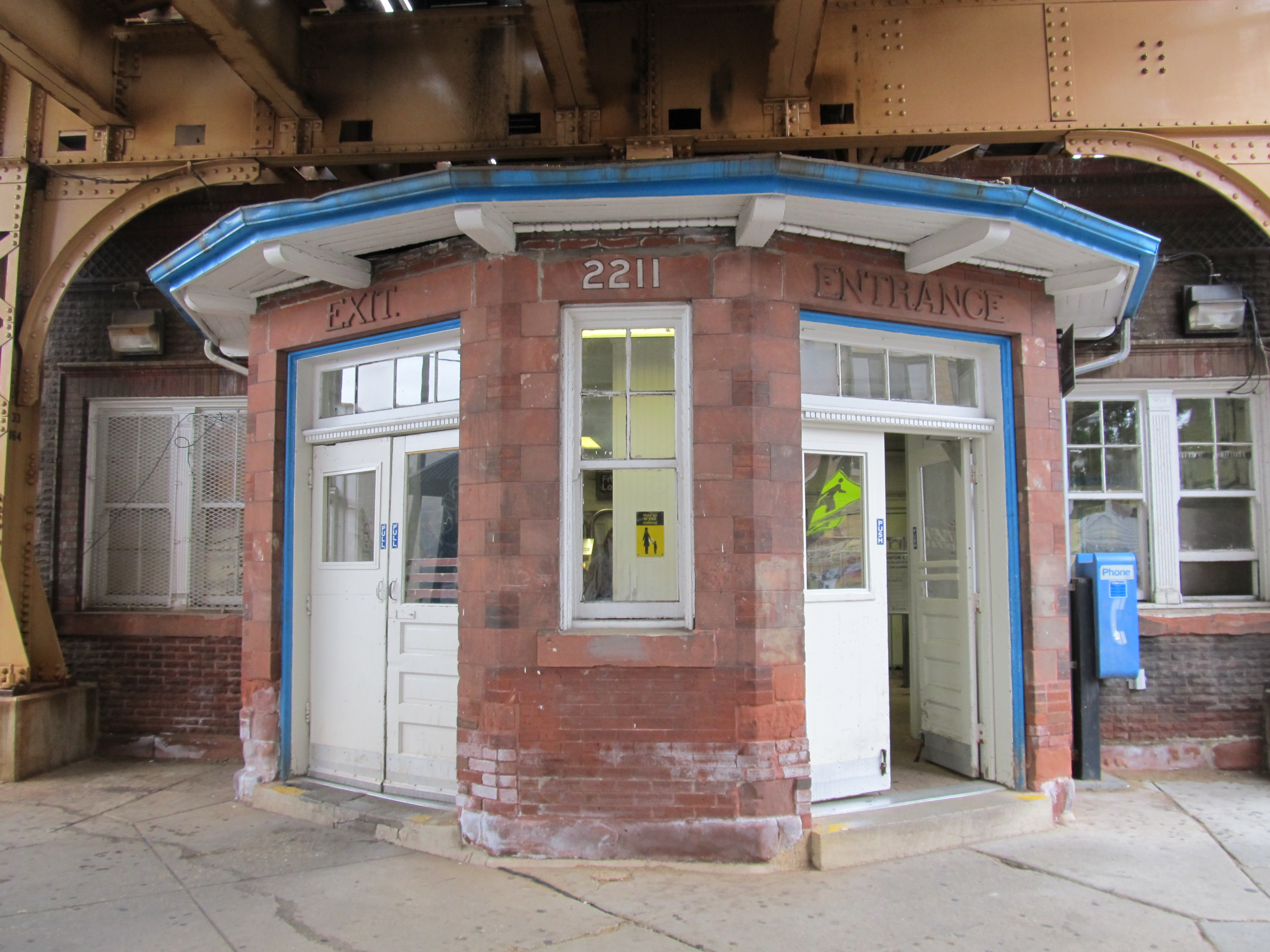
The station house at California in 2011; Western's station house was of a similar design.

Western had two wooden side platforms and a station house at street level. The station house, made of red pressed brick and white limestone trim with a stone sill and foundation, was designed similarly to other stations on the Logan Square branch, surviving examples of which are at California and Damen, with a corniced and dentiled front bay containing dual doors specifically marked "Entrance" and "Exit" and prolific use of terra cotta. Its platforms had hipped roof tin canopies in the center and decorative cast-iron railings with diamond designs. Unlike elsewhere on the "L", station houses on the Metropolitan had central heating and a basement. The Metropolitan's tracks and stations were constructed by the West Side Construction Company, a company with the same officers as the Metropolitan itself and the chief engineer of E. W. Elliot, with steel and iron from the Carnegie Steel Company.

=== Operations and connections ===
As originally opened, the Metropolitan's trains ran every six minutes between 6 a.m. and 6:30 p.m., and every ten minutes during the night; the average speed was 16 mph (26 km/h). Unlike the Lake Street Elevated, all of the Metropolitan's cars allowed smoking. Smoking was banned by the city across the "L" and in streetcars in response to a 1918 influenza outbreak, a prohibition that has remained in force ever since.

== Works cited ==
- Borzo, Greg (2007). The Chicago "L". Arcadia. ISBN 9780738551005 – via Google Books.
- Moffat, Bruce G. (1995). The "L": The Development of Chicago's Rapid Transit System, 1888–1932. Chicago: Central Electric Railfans' Association. ISBN 0-915348-30-6.
- "The Metropolitan West Side Elevated Railroad of Chicago". The Street Railway Review. 5: 263–274. January 15, 1895.
