= Wentworth station =

Wentworth 5900S 200W
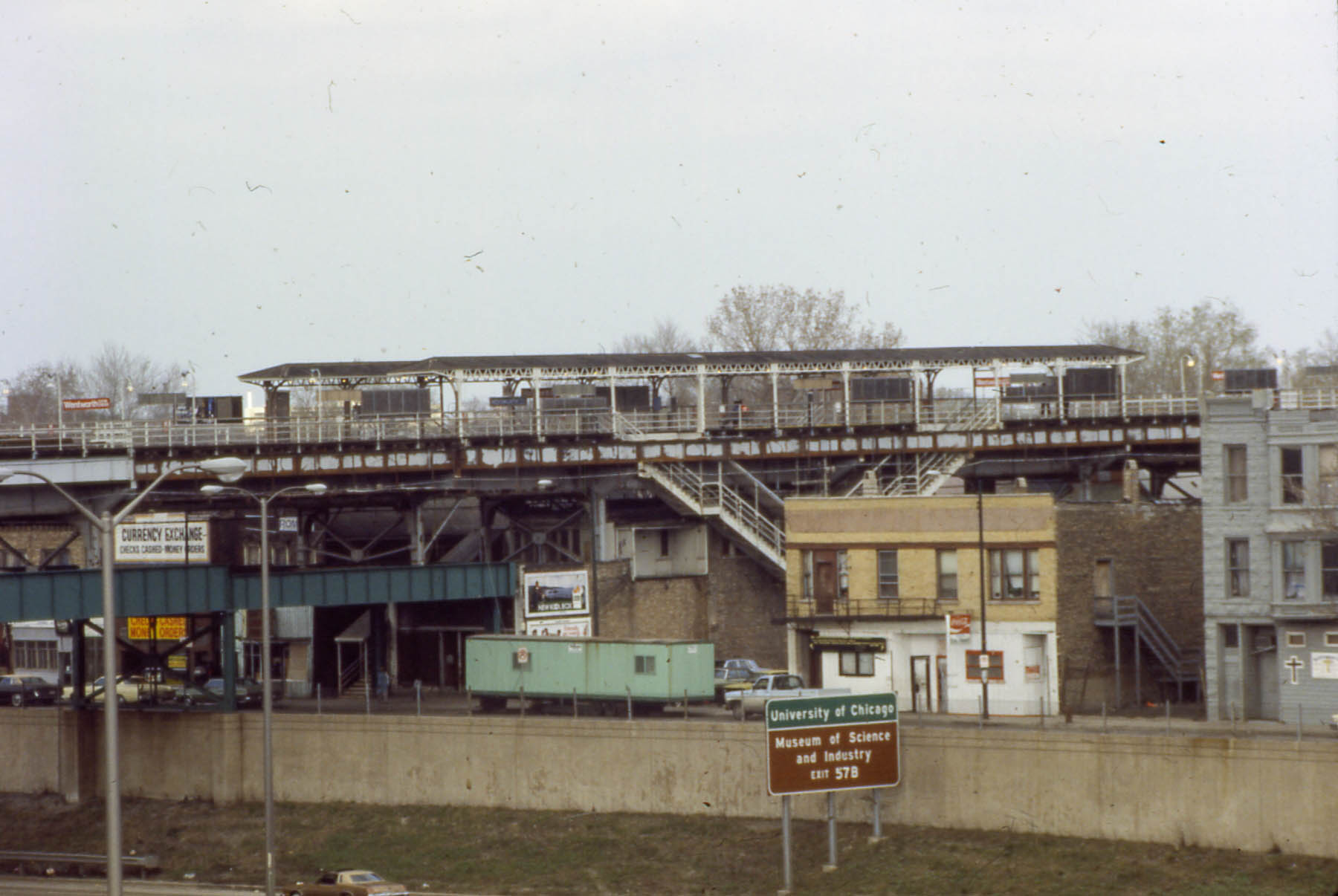
- Wentworth in 1986

General information
- Location: 5913 South Wentworth Avenue; Englewood, Chicago, Illinois
- Coordinates: 41.78681°N 87.62973°W
- Owner: Chicago Transit Authority
- Line: Englewood Branch
- Platforms: 2 side platforms
- Tracks: 2 tracks

Construction
- Structure type: Elevated

History
- Opened: December 10, 1905
- Closed: February 9, 1992

Former services
Preceding station	Chicago "L"	Following station
Harvard Closed 1992 toward Ashland	Englewood branch	58th toward Harlem/Lake
Location

Wentworth was a station on the Englewood Branch of the Chicago "L". The station opened on December 10, 1905, and closed on February 9, 1992. and demolished during the Green Line reconstruction of 1994–1996.
