= Halsted station (CTA Green Line) =

Chicago "L" station

Halsted 6300S 800W
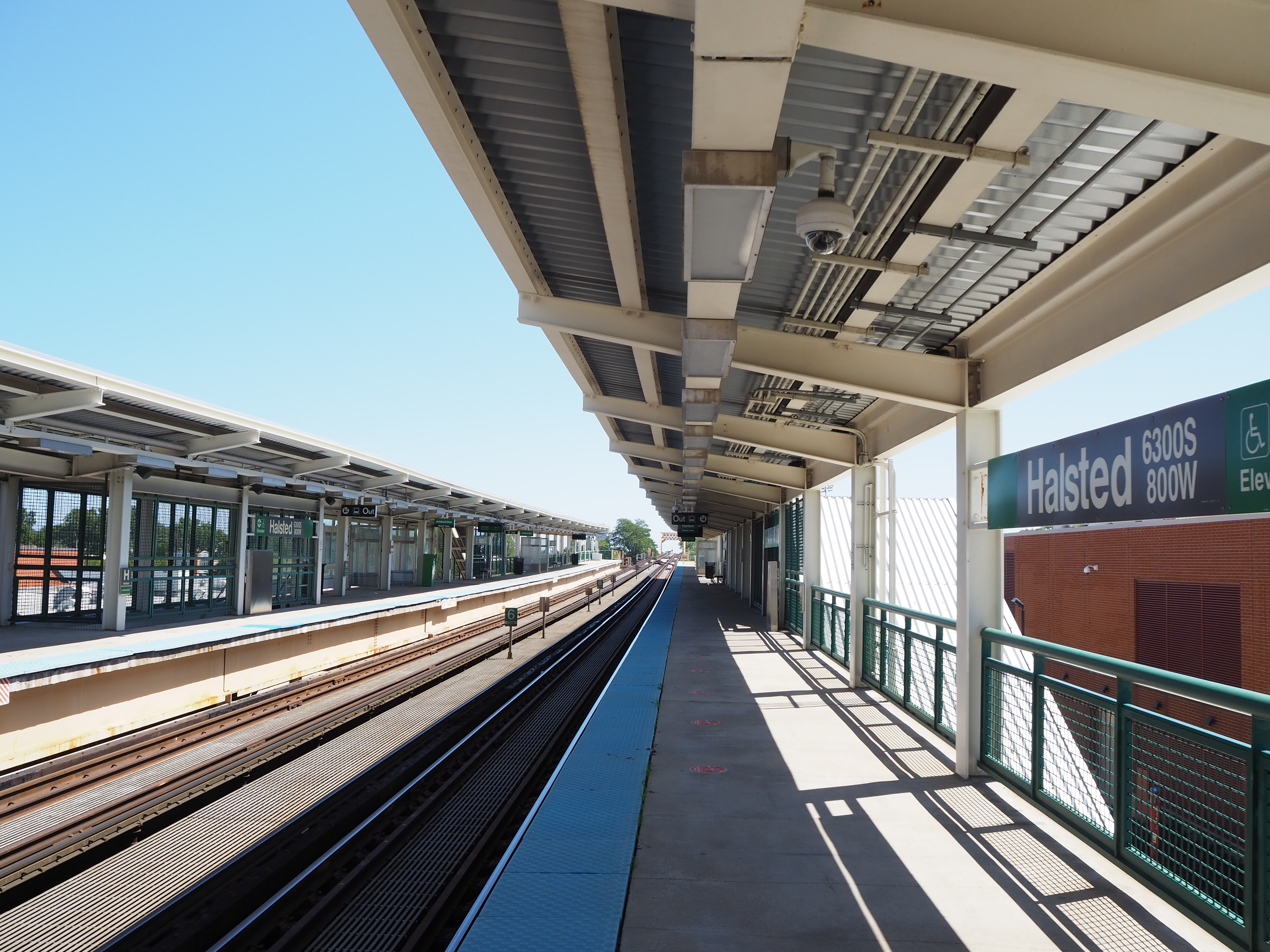

General information
- Location: 6321 South Halsted Street; Chicago, Illinois 60621
- Coordinates: 41.77954°N 87.64468°W
- Owner: Chicago Transit Authority
- Line: Ashland Branch
- Platforms: 2 side platforms
- Tracks: 2 tracks
- Connections: CTA bus

Construction
- Structure type: Elevated
- Cycle facilities: Yes
- Accessible: Yes

History
- Opened: December 24, 1906; 119 years ago
- Rebuilt: 1927; 99 years ago, 1996; 30 years ago

Passengers
- 2025: 121,652 ▲21.3%

Services
Preceding station	Chicago "L"	Following station
Ashland/63rd Terminus	Green Line Ashland branch	Garfield toward Harlem/Lake
Former services
Preceding station	Chicago "L"	Following station
Racine Closed 1994 toward Ashland	Englewood branch	Harvard Closed 1992 toward Harlem/Lake
Track layout
Location

Halsted is an "L" station on the CTA Green Line's Ashland branch, located in the Englewood neighborhood. It is situated at 6321 South Halsted Street. It opened on December 24, 1906.

== Station layout ==
The station has two side platforms and a single entrance on the east side of Halsted Street. The entrance contains turnstiles and a staircase and elevator reaching each platform as well as an escalator to the Harlem-bound platform. At the east end of each platform is an exit-only staircase.

== Bus connections ==
CTA

- 8 Halsted
- 63 63rd (Owl Service)
