= Roosevelt station (CTA Douglas branch) =

Rapid transit station in Chicago, 1896–1952

ROOSEVELT 1200S 1700W

General information
- Location: 1710 West Roosevelt Road; Chicago, Illinois, US
- Coordinates: 41.867402°N 87.669466°W
- Line: Douglas Park branch
- Platforms: 2 side platforms
- Tracks: 2

Construction
- Structure type: Elevated

History
- Opened: April 28, 1896
- Closed: May 3, 1952

Passengers
- 1951: 53,208 ▼2.64% (CTA)

Former services
Preceding station	Chicago "L"	Following station
14th Place Closed 1951 (Note: Wood after 1951.) toward Oak Park	Douglas branch	Polk toward Marshfield
Location

Roosevelt, originally 12th, was a rapid transit station on the Chicago "L"'s Douglas Park branch between 1896 and 1952. Constructed by the Metropolitan West Side Elevated Railroad, it was one of the first stations opened on the branch in April 1896.

One of the busiest stations on the branch for the first decades of its existence, its ridership became lackluster in the 1920s and started declining precipitously in the latter half of that decade. Although several other stations were closed in a December 1951 service revision to the branch, Roosevelt was spared that fate; instead, its service and facilities were drastically reduced and it became a "partial-service" station. This proved short-lived, however, and the station closed altogether in 1952.

== History ==
The Douglas Park branch opened on April 28, 1896, significantly later than the other branches of the Metropolitan West Side Elevated Railroad. One of its stations was located on 12th Street. The street was renamed Roosevelt Road in May 1919 to honor the recently deceased Theodore Roosevelt.

Douglas service was significantly streamlined on December 9, 1951, part of the Chicago Transit Authority (CTA)'s broader overhaul of the Metropolitan's lines. Skip-stop was instituted on the Douglas and Garfield branches, and several low-performing stations on the Douglas branch were closed. Roosevelt, Wood and Douglas Park were turned into "partial service stations". These stations lost their agents at all hours, entrance being instead through coin-operated turnstiles. Trains stopping at partial service stations did not stop at Polk, 18th, or California.

Partial service proved to be short-lived for Roosevelt, however; the CTA closed it and Douglas Park altogether on May 3, 1952.

== Station details ==
=== Design and infrastructure ===
Roosevelt was similar to other stations on the Douglas branch, with a brick Craftsman-style station house at street level. It had two wooden side platforms with cast-iron canopies with hipped roofs of corrugated, in common with the other stations on the Metropolitan's lines.

=== Operations ===
During the time of partial service stations, trains stopped at such stations every 15 minutes during rush hours and every 30 minutes at other times.

=== Ridership ===
In 1900, 12th (Note: Convention in Chicago is to omit "Street" and "Avenue" (though not "Place", "Drive", etc.) from rapid transit station names, a practice which has it roots as early as 1898.) was the highest-ridership station on the Douglas Park branch, with 611,758 riders. It would hold this position until 1904, when it was surpassed by Hoyne. Ridership peaked at 755,555 passengers in 1907, a year that also saw the peak of every stations' ridership between 12th and Hoyne, inclusive. Still the third-most popular Douglas Park station in 1907, by 1919 it had dropped to fifth place and by 1929 had become the sixth-least ridden station as riders moved west on the branch. Ridership last exceeded 700,000 passengers in 1910, 500,000 in 1924, 300,000 in 1929, and 200,000 in 1931.

In its last full year of operation, 1951, Roosevelt accommodated 53,208 passengers, a 2.64 percent decrease from the 54,649 passengers of 1950. Its relative ranking of Douglas ridership increased, however; in 1950, it was second only to Kenton – a station that had no street access and abutted a railway rather than an actual street, serving 19,826 passengers – in its disuse, whereas in 1951 it surpassed Kenton, the opened-in-December Central Park, and 14th Place on the branch. Ridership is not available for any CTA stations in 1952.

== Works cited ==
- CTA Rail Entrance, Annual Traffic, 1900–1979 (Report). Chicago: Chicago Transit Authority. October 1, 1979.
