= Harvard station (CTA) =

Harvard 6300S 300W

General information
- Location: 303 W. 63rd Street; Englewood, Chicago, Illinois
- Coordinates: 41.77935°N 87.63341°W
- Owner: Chicago Transit Authority
- Lines: Englewood branch Normal Park Branch
- Platforms: 2 side platforms
- Tracks: 2
- Connections: Dan Ryan Branch via 63rd

Construction
- Structure type: Elevated

History
- Opened: November 3, 1906
- Closed: February 9, 1992

Former services
Preceding station	Chicago "L"	Following station
Halsted toward Ashland	Englewood branch	Wentworth Closed 1992 toward Harlem/Lake
65th Street Closed 1954 toward 69th Street	Normal Park branch	Terminus
Location

Harvard was a station on the Englewood Branch of the Chicago "L" and was the northern terminus of the Normal Park Branch. The station opened on November 3, 1906, and closed on February 9, 1992. and demolished during the Green Line reconstruction of 1994–1996. The CTA considered constructing a new station at Harvard with a new park and ride lot that would have connected to the 63rd station on the Dan Ryan branch. No federal funding was available for the project and as a result, the construction of the new station did not happen.
