= Ashland branch =

Segment of the Chicago "L"

Coordinates: 41°46′44.5″N 87°38′40.3″W

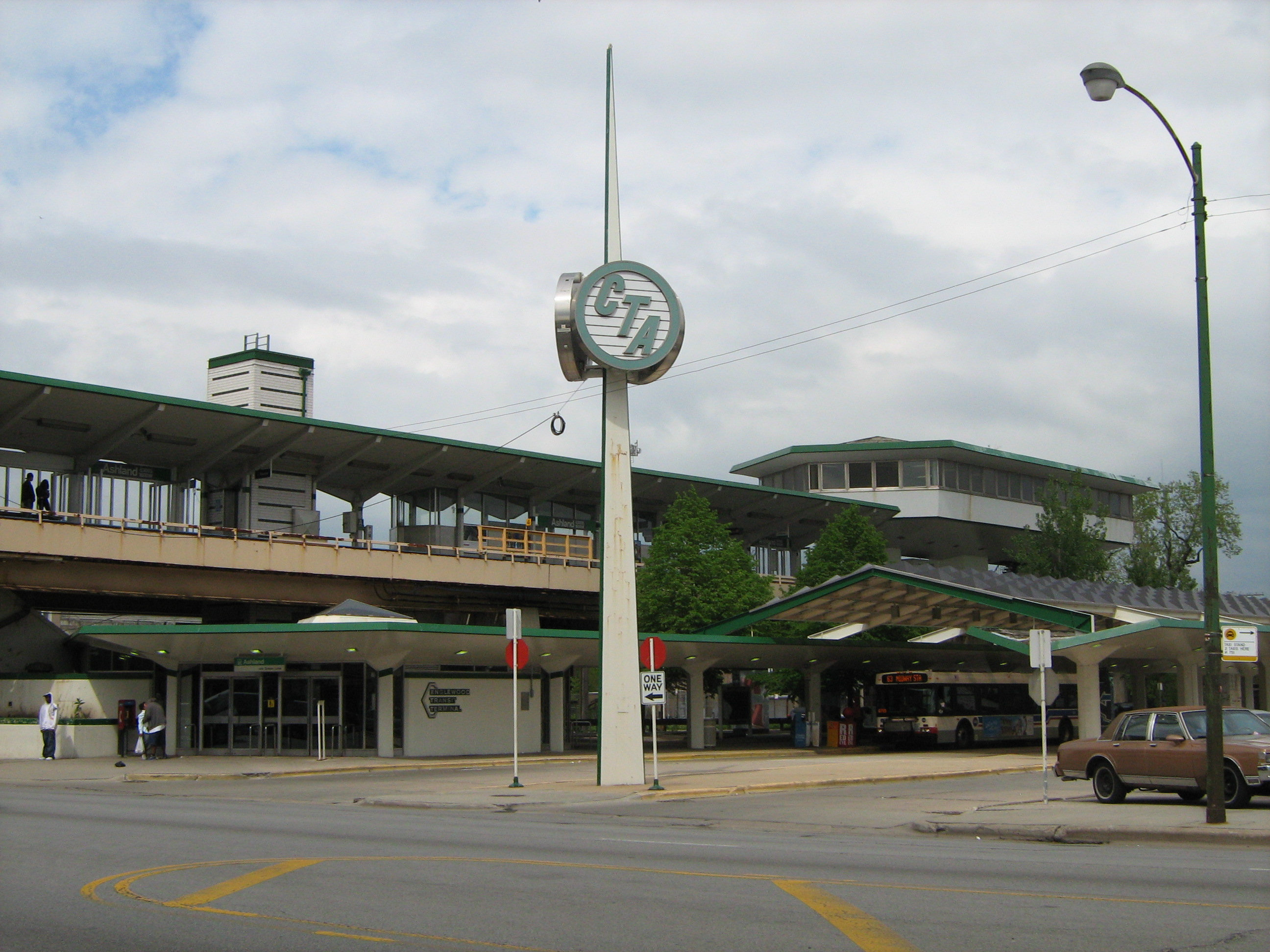
- Ashland/63rd station

Overview
- Status: Operational
- Locale: Chicago, Illinois, United States
- Termini: Halsted; Ashland/63rd
- Stations: 2

Service
- Type: Rapid transit
- System: Chicago "L"
- Services: Green
- Operator(s): Chicago Transit Authority (1947–present); Chicago Rapid Transit Company (1924–1947); South Side Elevated Railroad (1905–1924)
- Rolling stock: 5000-series
- Daily ridership: 1,508 (average weekday 2019)

History
- Opened: November 3, 1905; 121 years ago

Technical
- Line length: 3.0 mi (4.8 km)
- Character: Elevated
- Track gauge: 4 ft 8 1/2 in (1,435 mm) standard gauge
- Electrification: Third rail, 600 V DC

The Ashland branch, formerly known (and still internally referred to) as the Englewood branch, is a 3.0 mi (4.8 km) long branch of the Chicago "L" currently operated as the Green Line, serving the Englewood and West Englewood neighborhoods of Chicago, Illinois.

== History ==
The first station on the Ashland branch, State, opened November 3, 1905. After an incremental series of expansions, service was extended to the branch's first terminal at Loomis on July 13, 1907. On May 6, 1969, the Ashland/63rd terminal opened, replacing the old terminal at Loomis. On January 9, 1994, the Green Line closed for renovation. When the line reopened on May 12, 1996, the Englewood branch was renamed the Ashland branch.

== Station listing ==
Station	Location	Opened	Closed	Notes
59th Street junction to South Side Main Line
State	State Street and 59th Street	November 3, 1905	September 2, 1973	Demolished
Wentworth	5913 South Wentworth Avenue	December 10, 1905	February 9, 1992	Partially demolished
Princeton	Princeton Avenue and 61st Street	January 11, 1906	August 1, 1949	Demolished
Harvard	Harvard Avenue and 63rd Street	November 3, 1906	February 9, 1992	Demolished. Northeastern terminus of Normal Park branch; May 25, 1907, to January 29, 1954
Parnell	Parnell Avenue near 63rd Street	December 24, 1906	August 1, 1949	Demolished
Halsted	6321 South Halsted Street	December 24, 1906	—	Closed January 9, 1994 for reconstruction and accessibility upgrades; reopened May 12, 1996
Racine	6314-16 South Racine Avenue	February 25, 1907	January 9, 1994	Originally named Center Street. Proposals to reopen the station.
Loomis	Loomis Street and 63rd Street	July 13, 1907	May 5, 1969	Demolished; replaced by Ashland/63rd
Ashland/63rd	6315 South Ashland Avenue	May 6, 1969	—	Closed January 9, 1994 for renovation and accessibility upgrades; reopened May 12, 1996
