= Racine station (CTA Green Line) =

Defunct Chicago "L" station

Racine 6300S 1200W
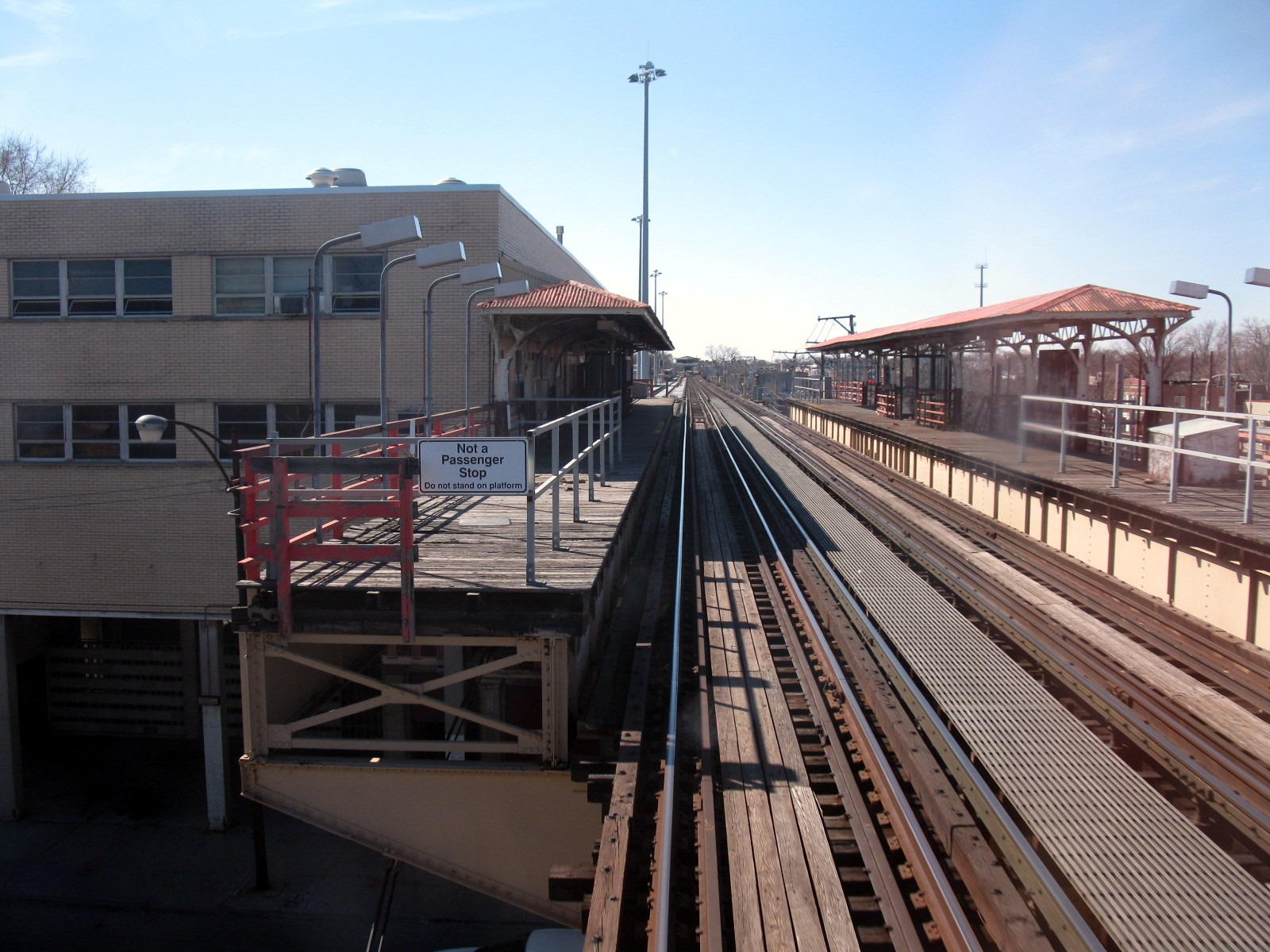

General information
- Location: 6314–16 South Racine Avenue; Chicago, Illinois 60621
- Coordinates: 41.779445°N 87.654515°W
- Owner: Chicago Transit Authority
- Line: Englewood Branch
- Platforms: 2 side platforms
- Tracks: 2 tracks

Construction
- Structure type: Elevated

History
- Opened: February 25, 1907; 119 years ago
- Closed: January 9, 1994; 32 years ago
- Former names: Center Street

Former services
Preceding station	Chicago "L"	Following station
Ashland Terminus	Englewood branch	Halsted toward Harlem/Lake
Loomis Closed 1969 Terminus	Englewood branch	Halsted toward Harlem/Lake

Future services
Preceding station	Chicago "L"	Following station
Ashland/63rd Terminus	Green Line Ashland branch	Halsted toward Harlem/Lake
Track layout
Location

Racine is an abandoned rapid transit station on the Chicago Transit Authority's Green Line. The station is located at 6314–16 South Racine Avenue in the Englewood neighborhood of Chicago, Illinois. Racine opened on February 25, 1907, when the Englewood branch of the South Side Elevated Railroad was extended westward. The station closed with the rest of the Green Line on January 9, 1994, but did not reopen with the rest of the Green Line on May 12, 1996.

== History ==
Racine was built in 1905–06 during the first years of the Englewood branch's existence. The station was designed in the Greek Revival style by architect Earl Nielson. The original station building and platform still remain at the site, as Racine has not undergone any major renovations since it opened. Racine is the only original Englewood station that has not been demolished or rebuilt.

Racine entered service on February 25, 1907. It served as the terminus of the Englewood branch before it was extended to Loomis in July of the same year. The station was originally known as Center Street; it changed its name when Center Street changed its name to Racine Avenue. When the CTA instituted A/B skip-stop service in 1949, Racine, along with the entire Englewood branch, became an "A" station.

=== Closure of the station ===
When the Green Line closed on January 9, 1994, for a two-year renovation, Racine closed along with the other Green Line stations. Racine did not reopen with the rest of the Green Line on May 12, 1996. The CTA decided to close Racine and five other stations permanently in 1994, when they began the Green Line project. The station closings were controversial in certain communities, and a group of over 20 community leaders known as the Green Line Coalition protested outside Mayor Richard M. Daley's office. They claimed that the CTA had reneged on its promise to reopen the stations and that the closures would affect economic development in poorer communities. Illinois State Senator Rickey Hendon also referred to the closings as racist and "a slap in the face" because the closed stations were in African-American communities. After they closed the station, the CTA chose not to demolish due to its status as a historic station per a memorandum of agreement between the CTA and the Illinois Historic Preservation Agency. As a result, employees at the adjacent Racine Shops train yard used the platforms to board and exit trains until the platform floors were removed in late 2016 to early 2017.

=== Reopening of the station ===
As of December 2022, the CTA considered reopening Racine after advocates in Englewood petitioned for its reopening. A referendum about reopening Racine was placed on ballots in the 16th Ward for the first round of the 2023 Chicago elections, with over 93% of voters supporting reopening in the ensuing vote on February 28, 2023. On December 16, 2025, Illinois Senate Bill 2111, the Northern Illinois Transit Authority Act, was passed into law, which authorized the reconstruction and reintroduction into revenue service of Racine by January 1, 2029.
