= Ashland/63rd station =

Chicago "L" station

Ashland/63rd 6300S 1600W
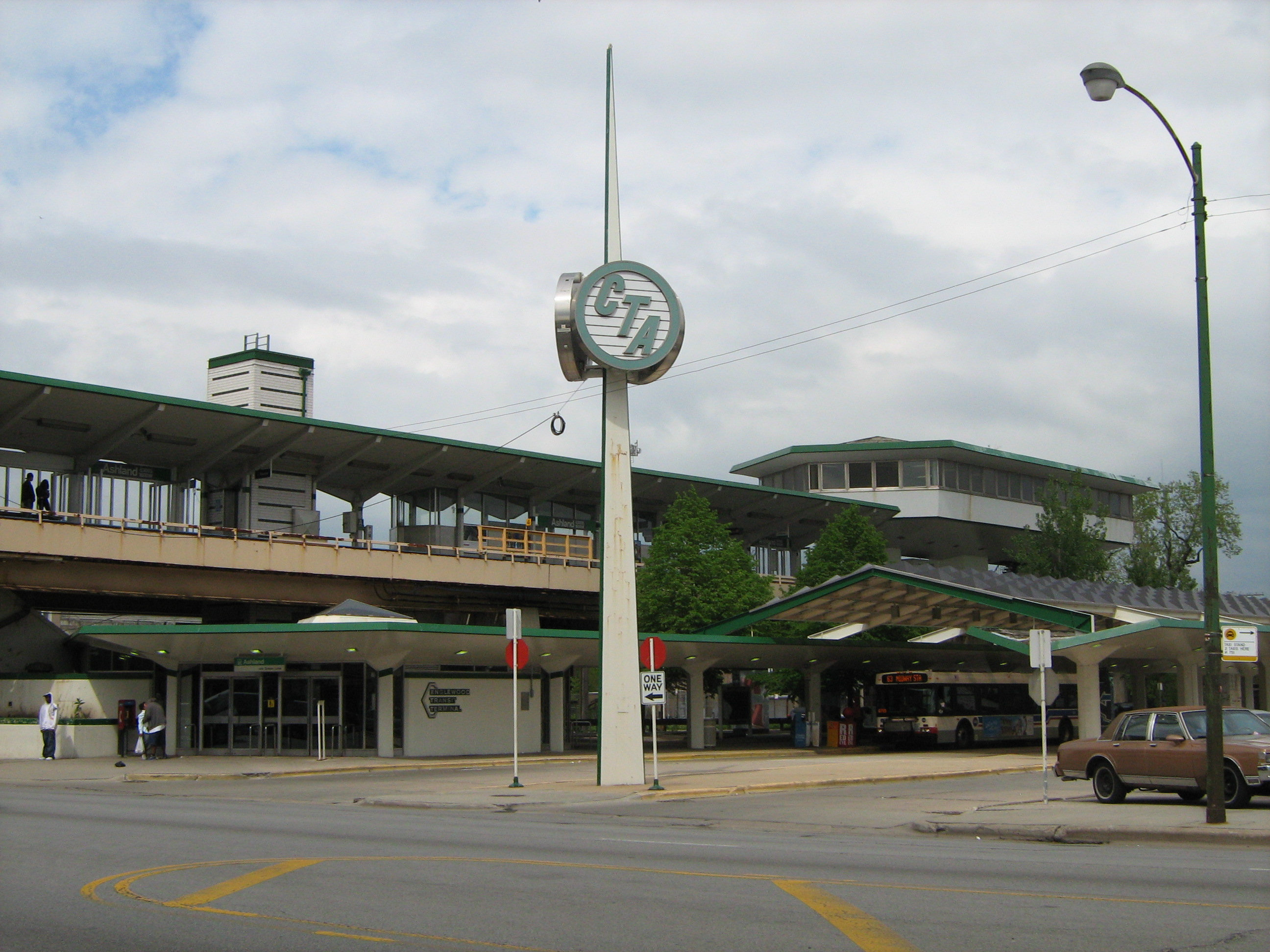

General information
- Location: 6315 South Ashland Avenue; Chicago, Illinois 60636
- Coordinates: 41.77943°N 87.66393°W
- Owner: Chicago Transit Authority
- Line: Ashland Branch
- Platforms: 1 island platform
- Tracks: 2 tracks
- Connections: CTA bus

Construction
- Structure type: Elevated
- Parking: 235 spaces
- Cycle facilities: Yes
- Accessible: Yes

History
- Opened: May 6, 1969; 57 years ago
- Former names: Ashland

Passengers
- 2025: 227,204 ▲18.9%

Services
Preceding station	Chicago "L"	Following station
Terminus	Green Line Ashland branch	Halsted toward Harlem/Lake
Former services
Preceding station	Chicago "L"	Following station
Terminus	Green Line Englewood branch	Racine Closed 1994 toward Harlem/Lake
Track layout
Location

Ashland/63rd is an 'L' station and the terminal of the CTA Green Line's Ashland branch, located in the West Englewood neighborhood of Chicago, Illinois. Situating at 6315 S. Ashland Avenue, the station contains a Park 'n' ride lot with 235 spaces as well as a Kiss 'n' Ride lane. This is one of two stations on the Green Line to be named Ashland. The other station is on the Lake Street branch and is shared between the Green and Pink Lines. The Red Line served this station from May 19, 2013 to October 20, 2013, April 3, 2017 to November 22, 2017, and July 30, 2018 to April 26, 2019.

== History ==
=== Loomis ===
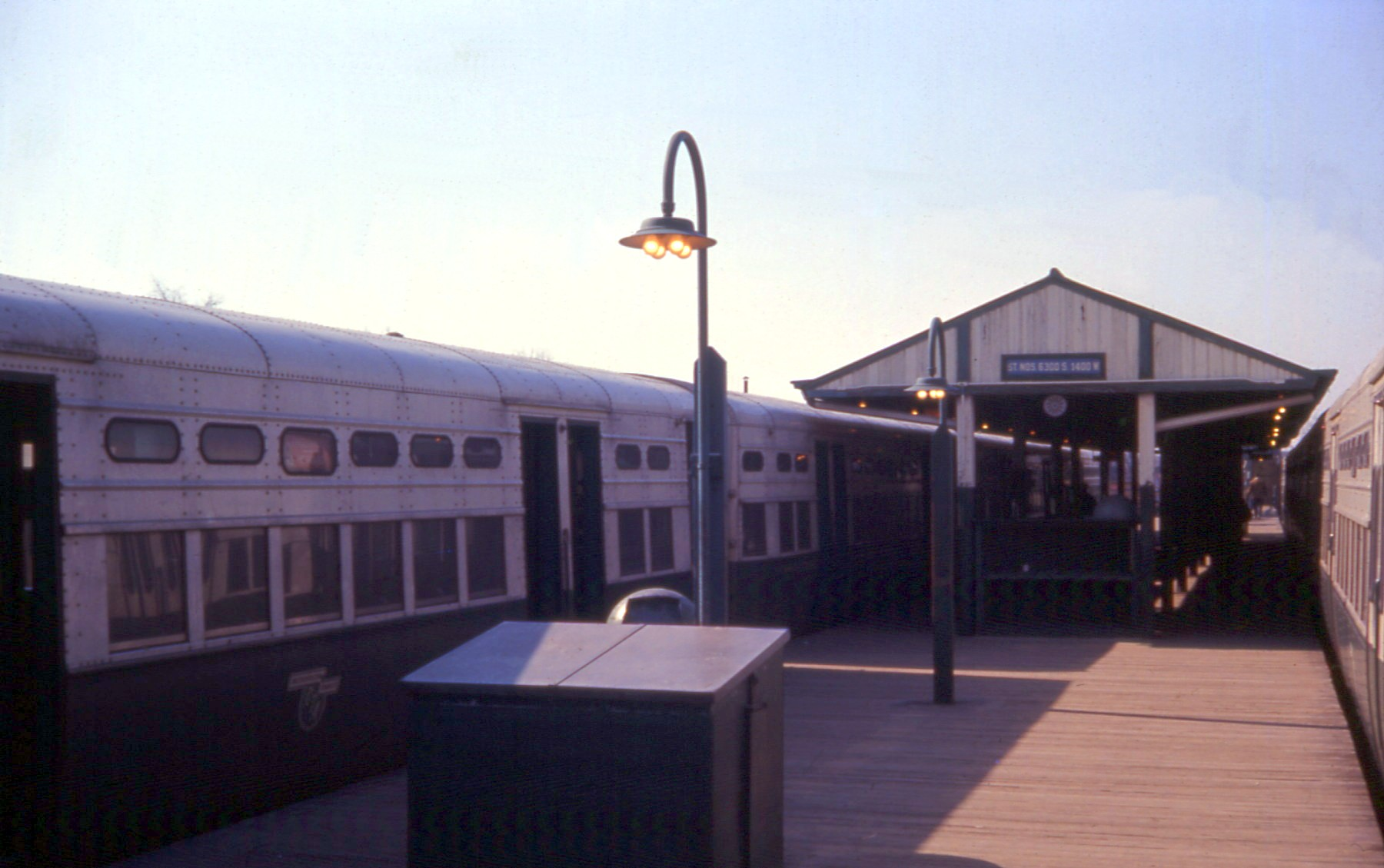
Former Loomis station prior to 1969 closure

Loomis was a station on the Englewood branch of the Chicago "L". Although other stations on the Englewood branch opened in stages, the station opened on July 13, 1907, concluding overall construction of the branch. Despite improvements to the station, it was closed in 1969 when the new Ashland terminal opened two blocks west.

=== Ashland/63rd ===
The Ashland/63rd station opened on May 6, 1969 to replace the Loomis terminal. Though the station itself was not rebuilt during the Green Line renovation in 1994-96, an elevator was added to the station to make it accessible to passengers with disabilities.

== Bus connections ==
CTA

- 9 Ashland (Owl Service)
- X9 Ashland Express (weekday rush hours only)
- 63 63rd (Owl Service)

== Image gallery ==
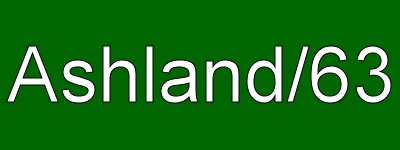
Ashland/63rd destination sign

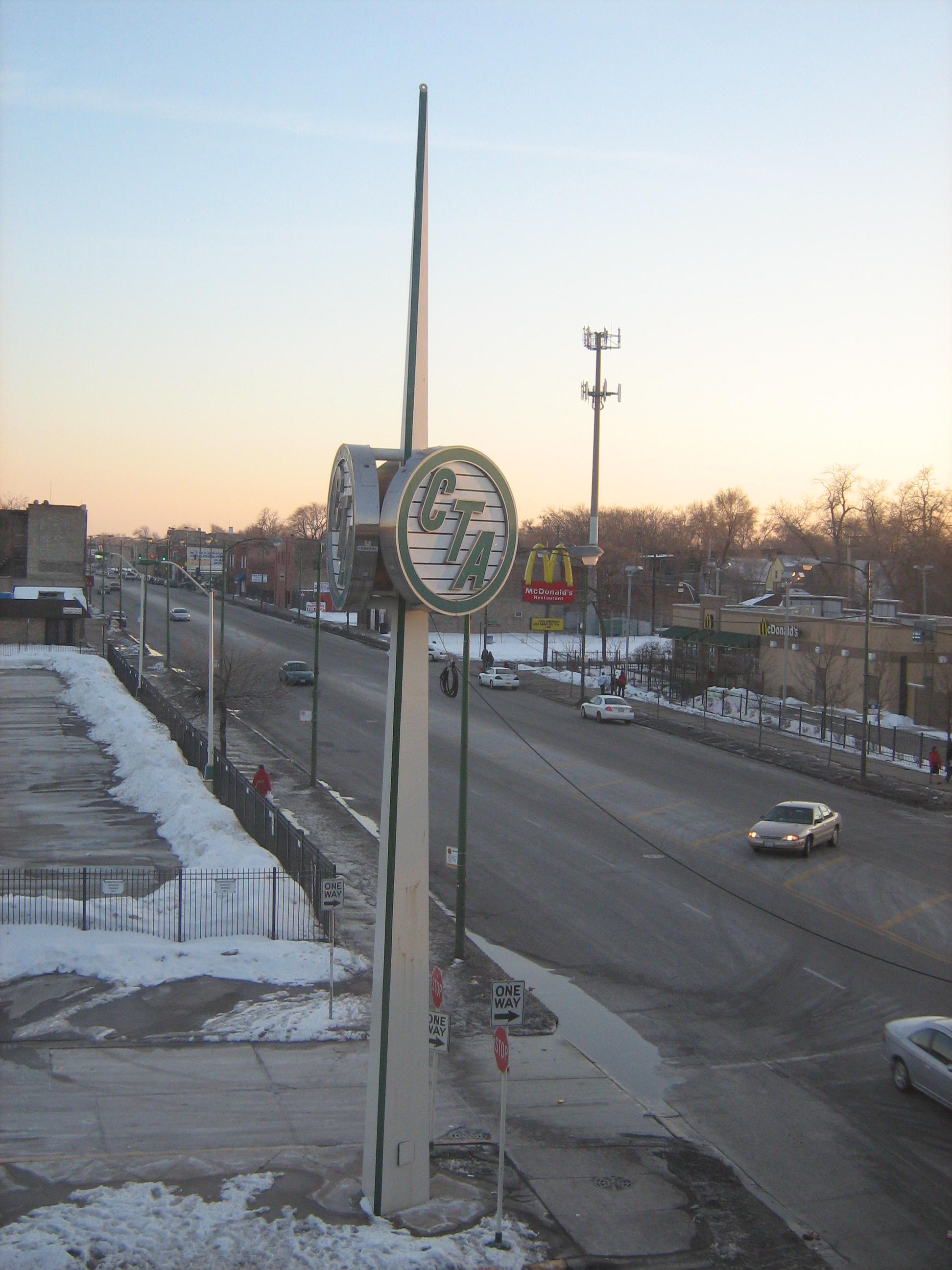
Giant CTA Monument

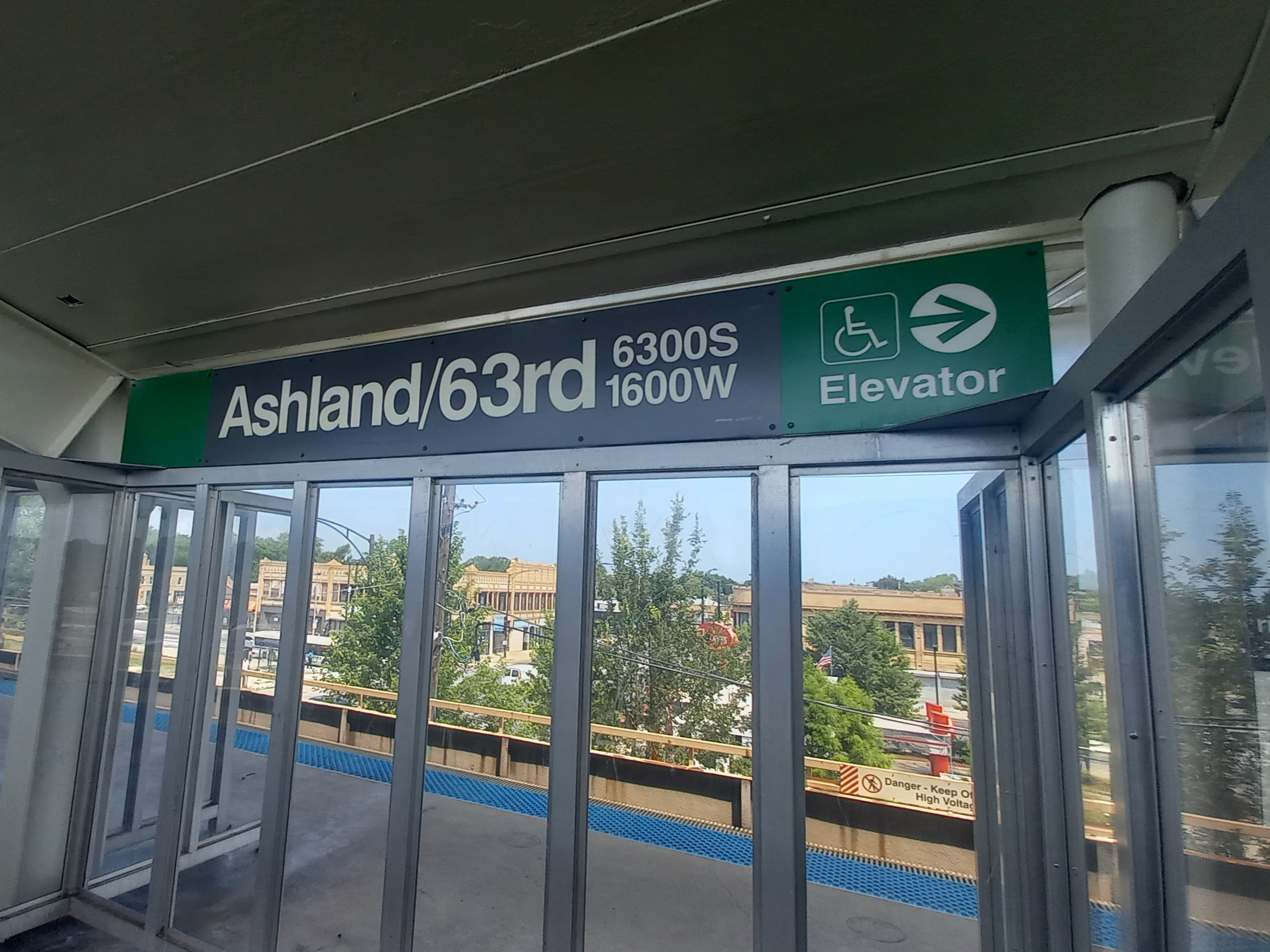
Platform sign

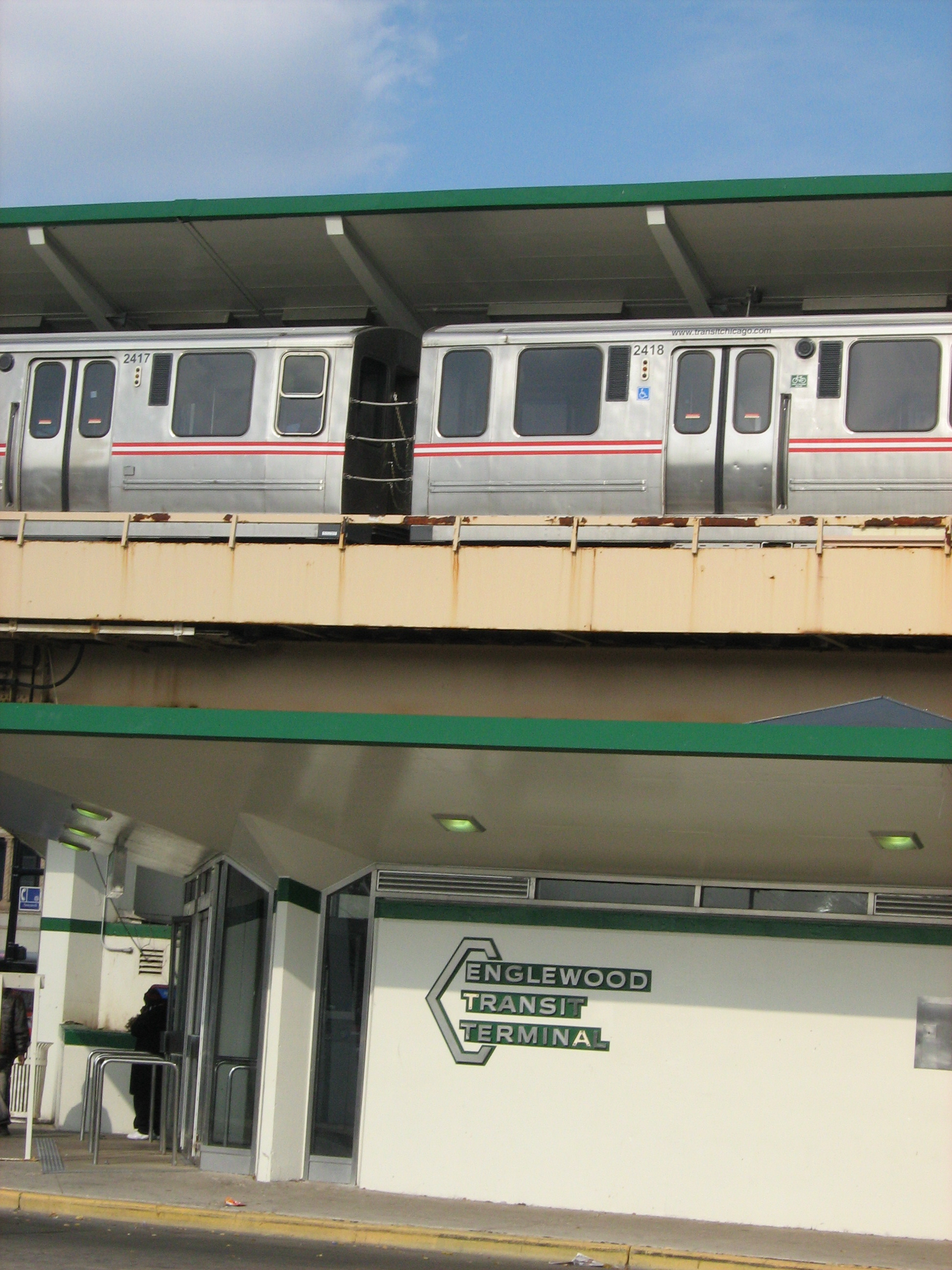
Ashland/63rd station exterior

== See also ==
- Ashland (CTA Green and Pink Lines station)
- Ashland (CTA Orange Line station)
- Ashland Yard
