= Englewood, Chicago =

Community area in Chicago, Illinois

Englewood
- Community area
- Community Area 68 – Englewood
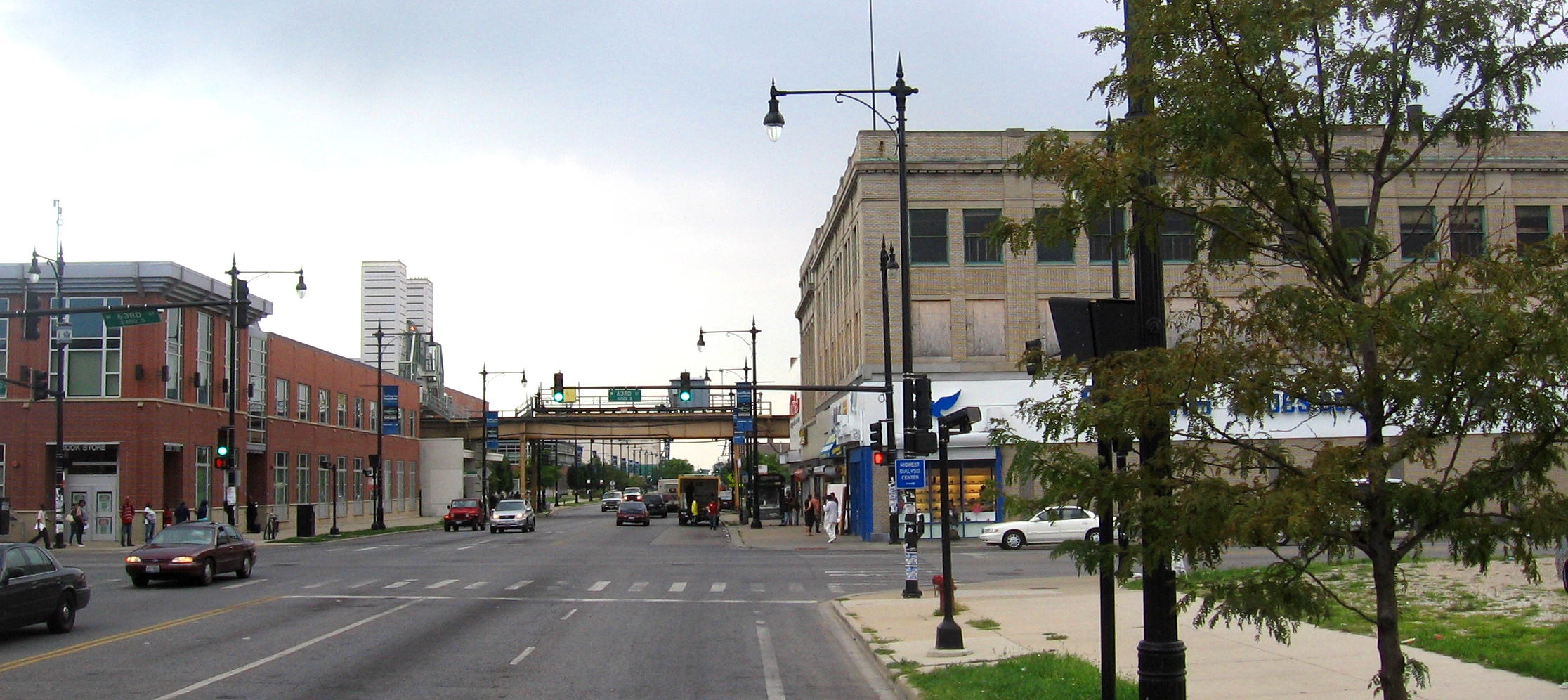
- The intersection of 63rd and Halsted, looking south.

- Location within the city of Chicago
- Coordinates: 41°46′48″N 87°38′42″W
- Country: United States
- State: Illinois
- County: Cook
- City: Chicago
- Named for: Englewood, New Jersey
- Neighborhoods: list: Englewood; Hamilton Park

Area
  - Total: 3.09 sq mi (8.00 km^{2})

Population (2024)
  - Total: 23,195
  - Density: 7,510/sq mi (2,900/km^{2})

Demographics 2024
  - White: 1.0%
  - Black: 85.8%
  - Hispanic: 9.5%
  - Asian: 0.6%
  - Other: 3.1 %
- Time zone: UTC-6 (CST)
  - Summer (DST): UTC-5 (CDT)
- Zip codes: part of 60621
- Area code: 773
- Median income 2020: $22,228
- Source: U.S. Census, Record Information Services

Englewood is a neighborhood and community area located on the South Side of Chicago, Illinois, United States. It is also the 68th of the 77 community areas in the city. At its peak population in 1960, over 97,000 people lived in its approximately 3 square miles (7.8 km^{2}), but the neighborhood's population has since dropped dramatically. In 2000, it had a population of approximately 40,000 inhabitants, and the 2010 census indicated that its population has further declined to approximately 30,000. Englewood is bordered by Garfield Boulevard to the north, 75th Street to the south, Racine Avenue to the west, and an irregular border that bends along the Metra Railroad Tracks to the east. On the southwest side of Chicago lies West Englewood, which is generally lumped in with Englewood by Chicagoans. Englewood, a low-income African-American community, has a high rate of foreclosed properties due to the area's population drop.

== History ==
Before 1850, Englewood was an oak forest with much swampland. In 1852 several railroad lines crossed at what became known as Junction Grove, stimulating the beginning of what we know today as Englewood. The Union Stock Yard provided employment to early residents. In 1868 Henry B. Lewis, a wool merchant in the Loop and Board of Education member, suggested a new name from his association with Englewood, New Jersey. In 1865, Junction Grove was annexed to the Town of Lake and to Chicago in 1889. The World's Columbian Exposition at nearby Jackson Park in 1893 led to real estate speculation and expansion of the community.

The Englewood community was largely defined by the Englewood Shopping Center at 63rd & Halsted, a large pedestrian mall. The City, social services, and mall management worked with community leaders and groups to integrate the mall with the community. It was the site of numerous community events, parades, outdoor concerts, live radio broadcasts and the like. This was spearheaded by the Englewood Business Men's Association and its director, Richard Drew; after Drew's death in 1978 the Center lost its major anchor tenants, including Sears Roebuck, and became a collection of smaller merchants.

In 1999, Mayor Richard M. Daley announced a $256 million revitalization plan for the area. The keystone of the program is the relocation of Kennedy–King College to the former site of the Englewood Shopping Center. Shortly thereafter the city began an aggressive buyout and relocation program for mall merchants. The campus includes the Washburne Culinary Institute. Groundbreaking for the new, 40-acre (16 ha) campus occurred on November 9, 2005, and it opened in 2007.

Digital images of Englewood can be found in Explore Chicago Collections, a digital repository made available by Chicago Collections archives, libraries and other cultural institutions in the city.

Englewood has a community parade every year, which is geared towards preparing its deserving youth for a new school year. The Englewood Back To School Parade is held annually every 3rd Saturday in August. The parade was founded by Willie Pittman, the first licensed Black plumber in the city, in 1961.

== Demographics ==
Historical population
Census	Pop.	Note	%±
1930	89,063		—
1940	92,849		4.3%
1950	94,134		1.4%
1960	97,595		3.7%
1970	89,659		−8.1%
1980	59,075		−34.1%
1990	48,434		−18.0%
2000	40,222		−17.0%
2010	30,654		−23.8%
2020	24,369		−20.5%

In 2000, Englewood had a poverty rate of 44%, substantially higher than the overall poverty rate in Chicago of 20%.

Based on census data collected by the city of Chicago in 2008–2012, the poverty rate for Englewood is 46.6% of households below poverty and 28% of people 16 years of age and older are unemployed.

In 1960, Englewood had 67,216 African American residents who made up about 69% of its population. At the time most African Americans resided around 63rd Street. At the time the median income of Englewood was $5,579 ($60,716.34 adjusted for inflation).

By 1980, the total population was 62,069, a loss of about 30,000 people in two decades; 99% of the people were black, and the white population was down to 818. Edward McClelland of NBC Chicago stated "Not even ethnic cleansing in the Balkans achieved the levels of turnover that white flight in Chicago did."

These communities have among the highest incidents of adolescent violence in the city, creating serious safety and public health concerns.

== Transportation ==
Halsted Street is a major thoroughfare in the neighborhood.

Both the Red Line (stopping at Garfield and 63rd) and Green Line (stopping at Halsted) run through Englewood, as does the Dan Ryan Expressway (I-90 and I-94).

The railroad junction at Englewood, where Metra (the former Rock Island) crosses Norfolk Southern (the former Pennsylvania) has long been a cause of delay. In March 2010 a $133 million reconstruction project was announced which improved operations by replacing the diamond crossing between Metra and NS with an overpass for Metra. The project proposed by Chicago Region Environmental and Transportation Efficiency Program (CREATE) was completed in 2014.

== Education ==
Englewood is host to numerous publicly-operated educational institutions. Primary and secondary schools are operated by Chicago Public Schools, while the community has post-secondary educational needs met at the Kennedy–King College, which was relocated to Englewood in 2005 as part of revitalization efforts in the neighborhood. A public high school, Englewood STEM High School, was opened in September 2019 to serve students in the surrounding area. In 2024, 12.0 percent of adults over the age of 25 had a bachelor's degree or higher, an increase from 5.2 percent in 2000. 78.4 percent of adults had graduated high school, an increase from 59.3 percent in 2000.

== Politics ==
The Englewood community area has supported the Democratic Party in recent presidential elections by overwhelming margins. In the 2016 presidential election, Englewood cast 8,646 votes for Hillary Clinton and cast 141 votes for Donald Trump (97.11% to 1.58%). In the 2012 presidential election, Englewood cast 12,344 votes for Barack Obama and cast 45 votes for Mitt Romney (99.53% to 0.36%).

== Popular culture ==
In 2018, Australian film director George Gittoes made a documentary about Englewood. The 2019 TV show South Side takes place in the area of Englewood.

== Other Places ==
Englewood, Florida is named after Englewood, Chicago.

== Notable people ==
- Jamie Foster Brown, magazine publisher, and her sister Stella Foster, who are both entertainment journalists
- Margaret Bonds, composer, pianist, arranger, and educator.
- Young Chop, music producer.
- Derrick Rose, former professional basketball player who has played for Chicago Bulls.
- Anthony Davis, professional basketball player who has played for the Los Angeles Lakers and New Orleans Pelicans. He won a championship with the Los Angeles Lakers in the 2020 NBA finals. He currently plays for the Washington Wizards.
- Chief Keef, rapper, producer, and songwriter. He was raised in Englewood.
- Bina Deneen, First Lady of Illinois (1905–1913). She resided at 532 West 61st Place until it was destroyed during the "Pineapple Primary".
- Charles Deneen, 23rd Governor of Illinois (1905–1913) and later United States Senator (1925–1931). He resided at 532 West 61st Place until it was destroyed during the "Pineapple Primary".
- Lil Durk, rapper, singer, and songwriter. He was raised in Englewood.
- Hubert Geralds (born 1964), serial killer known as the Englewood Strangler
- Kenny Golladay, NFL player.
- H.H. Holmes, serial killer and con artist who operated a "murder castle" at a corner of South Wallace Avenue and West 63rd Street. He was a resident of Englewood from 1886 to 1894.
- Jennifer Hudson, singer and actress
- Richard Hunt, sculptor who served as Commissioner of the Smithsonian Institution's National Museum of American Art from 1980 to 1986.
- Harold L. Ickes, 32nd United States Secretary of the Interior (1933–1946). He moved to Englewood as a child and attended Englewood High School.
- Ralph Lewis, actor best known as Austin Stoneman in The Birth of a Nation.
- Willard Motley, African-American author. He was raised at 350 West 60th Street.
- Bernie Mac, actor and comedian. He was raised in Englewood near West 69th Street and South Sangamon Street.
- James Meeks (born 1956), pastor and former member of the Illinois Senate (2003–2013). He was raised in Englewood near West 64th Street and South Laflin Street.
- William T. Murphy (1899–1978), member of Congress from Illinois's 3rd congressional district (1959–1971). He resided at 6617 South Harvard Avenue during his time in Congress.
- Morgan F. Murphy, member of Congress from Illinois's 3rd congressional district. He graduated from Leo High School.
- Lil Reese, rapper
- Fredo Santana, rapper.
- Mavis Staples, singer
- Famous Dex, rapper
