= Carol Ross Barney =

American architect (born 1949)

- Barney at the Chicago Riverwalk section she designed
- Born: April 12, 1949 (age 77); Chicago, Illinois, United States
- Education: University of Illinois at Urbana-Champaign (B.Arch., 1971), University of Illinois at Urbana-Champaign (M.Arch., 1984)
- Occupation: Architect
- Awards: 2023 AIA Gold Medal; 2021 Cooper Hewitt, Smithsonian Design Museum National Design Award for Architecture and Interior Design; 2021 Lincoln Academy of Illinois Order of Lincoln Award; 2018 Honorary ASLA Member; 2017 AIA Chicago Lifetime Achievement Award; 2013 AIA COTE Top Ten Green Project Award; 2013 AIA Divine Detail Award, Citation of Merit
- Practice: Ross Barney Architects
- Projects: New Oklahoma City Federal Building, Chicago Riverwalk

Carol Ross Barney FAIA (born 1949) is an American architect and the founder and Design Principal of Ross Barney Architects. She is the 2023 winner of the AIA Gold Medal. She became the first woman to design a federal building when commissioned as architect for the Oklahoma City Federal Building, which replaced the bombed Alfred P. Murrah Federal Building. Ross Barney's other projects include the JRC Synagogue (LEED Platinum), James I Swenson Civil Engineering Building (LEED Gold), the CTA Morgan Street Station, and the Chicago Riverwalk.

== Biography ==
Carol Ross Barney was born in Chicago, Illinois on April 12, 1949. She began her education in the Chicago Public Schools. In 1958, her father, an accountant and management consultant, was relocated to Düsseldorf in the British sector of West Germany. Returning to the Chicago area for high school, Barney attended the all-girls Catholic school Regina Dominican in Wilmette. She enrolled in the Architecture program at the University of Illinois at Urbana-Champaign receiving a Bachelor of Architecture degree in 1971. She returned and completed her Master of Architecture in 1984.

Barney enlisted in the U.S. Peace Corps immediately after graduation, and was assigned to Costa Rica where she worked for the fledgling Costa Rican National Park Service. Her projects included a master plan for coral reef protection and interpretation at Parque Nacional Cahuita, restoration of the historic hacienda at Parque Nacional Santa Rosa and worker housing at Parque Nacional Volcan Poas.

Following Peace Corps service, Barney joined Holabird and Root in Chicago and met her mentor, John A. Holabird, FAIA. The work there ranged from the 1979 AIA Institute Honor Award-winning restoration of the Chicago Public Library and Cultural Center to improvements for the Chicago Main Post Office.

In 1973, Barney was a founding member of Chicago Women in Architecture (CWA) and served as CWA's first president. In 1988, while serving in the national AIA Women in Architecture Committee, she was advisor for two related AIA Exhibitions "That Exceptional One" and "Many More", groundbreaking explorations about women architects. CWA brought Barney together with Natalie deBlois, FAIA of Skidmore Owings and Merrill, who remained a close friend until deBlois's death in 2013.

In 1981, Barney started a solo practice in Chicago. Her college classmate, James Jankowski, FAIA, joined her from 1982 to 2005, and from 1984 to 2006 the firm was called Ross Barney + Jankowski. Barney was awarded the 1983 Francis J. Plym Traveling Fellowship from the University of Illinois. The fellowship funded travel for research and allowed her to study the post-war planning and rebuilding of European cities during 1983–84.

In 2001, construction began for the new Oklahoma City Federal Building, with Barney chosen as the lead designer for the replacement building for the Oklahoma City Federal Building following the terrorist bombing in 1995. The new Oklahoma City Federal Building had the design objective to create a space that was secure but open to reflect the United States democracy.

Barney began combining her own teaching with practice in 1976, when she taught at the University of Illinois Chicago. Since 1994, she has been adjunct Professor of Architecture at the Illinois Institute of Technology where she teaches a popular advanced design studio and serves on the College of Architecture Board of Overseers.

Through her firm Ross Barney Architects, Barney has designed numerous projects for which she has received several accolades. In 2005, Barney was awarded the Thomas Jefferson Award from the AIA for her distinguished portfolio of public buildings. One of her most recent projects, the expansion of the Chicago Riverwalk, received over seven different awards, including the 2017 Blue Ribbon Award – Friends of the Chicago River. For this project, along with her extensive accomplishments, Barney was awarded the AIA Chicago Lifetime Achievement Award in 2017.

Barney continues to oversee design projects through her firm, Ross Barney Architects.

== Awards and honors ==
- 2023 AIA Gold Medal
- 2021 Cooper Hewitt, Smithsonian Design Museum National Design Award for Architecture and Interior Design
- 2021 Lincoln Academy of Illinois Order of Lincoln Award
- 2019 Fast Company Magazine The World's Most Innovative Companies; Architecture
- 2019 Illinois Green Alliance Emerald Award for the McDonald's Chicago Flagship
- 2019 Award for Excellence in Design, Leadership, and Service, Society of Architectural Historians
- 2018 Honorary ASLA Member
- 2018 Metropolis (architecture magazine) Game Changer
- 2017 AIA Chicago Lifetime Achievement Award
- 2017 Chicago Magazine's Chicagoans of the Year
- 2015 Vision Award; Smart Transit Solutions and Neighborhood Impact, Urban Land Institute Chicago
- 2013 AIA COTE Top Ten Green Project Award for Swenson Civil Engineering Building
- 2013 AIA Divine Detail Award, Citation of Merit for Chicago Riverwalk – Underbridge Canopy Detail
- 2012 Chicago AIA Distinguished Building Award, Citation of Merit for CTA Morgan Station
- 2012 Evergreen Award for James I. Swenson Civil Engineering Building at the University of Minnesota, Duluth
- 2012 American Architecture Awards for James I. Swenson Civil Engineering Building at the University of Minnesota, Duluth
- 2011 AIA Distinguished Building Award, Honor Award for James I Swenson Civil Engineering Building
- 2011 AIA Distinguished Building Award, Citation of Merit for Fullerton and Belmont Stations Reconstruction
- 2009 AIA COTE Top Ten Green Project Award for Jewish Reconstructionist Congregation
- 2009 World Architecture Festival – Category Commendation for Jewish Reconstructionist Congregation Synagogue
- 2002 AIA Institute Honor Award for Architecture for the Little Village Academy
- 1992 Federal Design Achievement Award through the Presidential Design Awards program, sponsored by the National Endowment for the Arts for the Glendale Heights Post Office
- 1991 AIA Institute Honor Award Achievement for the Glendale Heights Post Office

Barney is a Fellow of the American Institute of Architects. Her drawings have also been exhibited and collected by the Art Institute of Chicago, the Chicago Historical Society, The Museum of Contemporary Art Chicago and the National Building Museum. In addition, her oral history has been collected by the Art Institute of Chicago.

== Selected works ==
- O'Hare International Airport Multi-modal Terminal, Chicago, Illinois, 2019
- Lincoln Park Zoo Visitor Center, Chicago, Illinois, 2018
- McDonald's Chicago Flagship, Chicago, Illinois, 2018
- Chicago Riverwalk, Chicago, Illinois, 2016
- Cermak-McCormick Place station, Chicago, Illinois, 2015
- Fermilab, Office Technical and Education Building, Batavia, Illinois, 2014
- Highland Park Elementary, Stillwater, Oklahoma, 2014
- Will Rogers Elementary, Stillwater, Oklahoma, 2014
- Ohio State University South Campus Central Chiller Plant, Columbus, Ohio, 2013
- University of Chicago Child Development Center Drexel, Chicago, Illinois, 2013
- CTA Morgan station, In conjunction with TranSystems, Chicago, Illinois, 2012
- CTA Grand/State station, Chicago, Illinois, 2012
- CTA Fullerton and Belmont Stations, Chicago, Illinois, 2012
- James I. Swenson Civil Engineering Building, University of Minnesota Duluth, Duluth, Minnesota, 2010
- Washington University Childcare Facility, St. Louis, Missouri, 2010
- Jewish Reconstructionist Congregation Synagogue, Evanston, Illinois, 2008
- Commodore John Barry Elementary School, Philadelphia, Pennsylvania, 2008
- Champaign Public Library, Champaign, Illinois, 2008
- Mitzi Freidheim Child Family Center, Chicago, Illinois, 2007
- College of DuPage Early Childhood Education and Care Facility, Glen Ellyn, Illinois, 2007
- Oakton Community College Art, Science, and Technology Building, Skokie, Illinois, 2006
- New Oklahoma City Federal Building, Oklahoma City, Oklahoma, 2005
- Glenside Public Library, Glendale Heights, Illinois, 2003
- Governors State University Family Development Center, University Park, Illinois, 2003
- Governors State University Faculty Office Building, University Park, Illinois, 2003
- Levy Senior Center, Evanston, Illinois, 2002
- Little Village Academic Resource Center, Chicago, Illinois, 2001
- Carole Robertson Center for Learning, Chicago, Illinois, 2002
- Little Village Academy, Chicago, Illinois, 1996
- Cesar Chavez Multicultural Academic Center, Chicago, Illinois, 1993

== Gallery ==
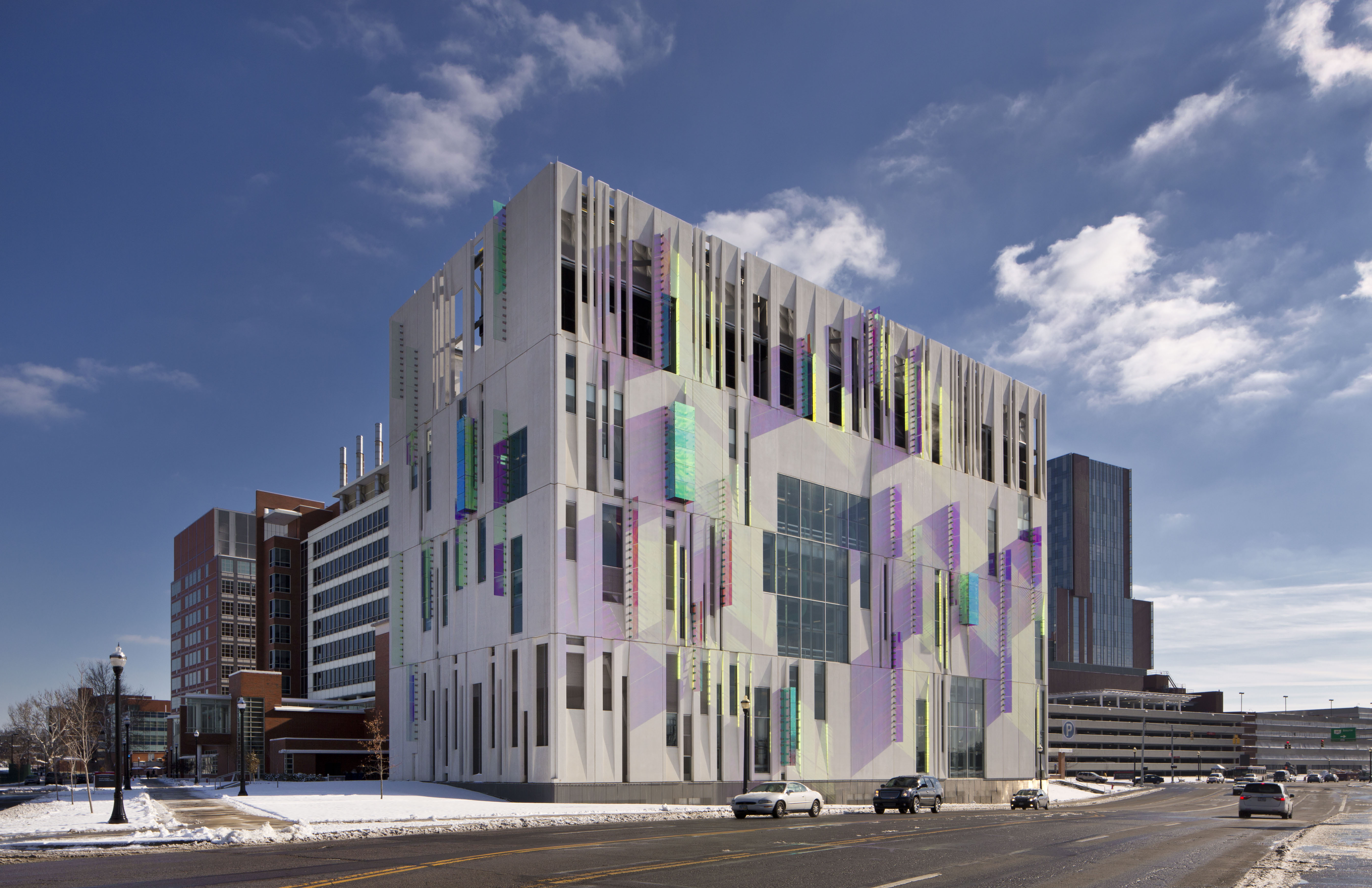
File:Ohio_State_University_South_Campus_Central_Chiller_Plant.jpgThe South Campus Chiller Plant at The Ohio State University

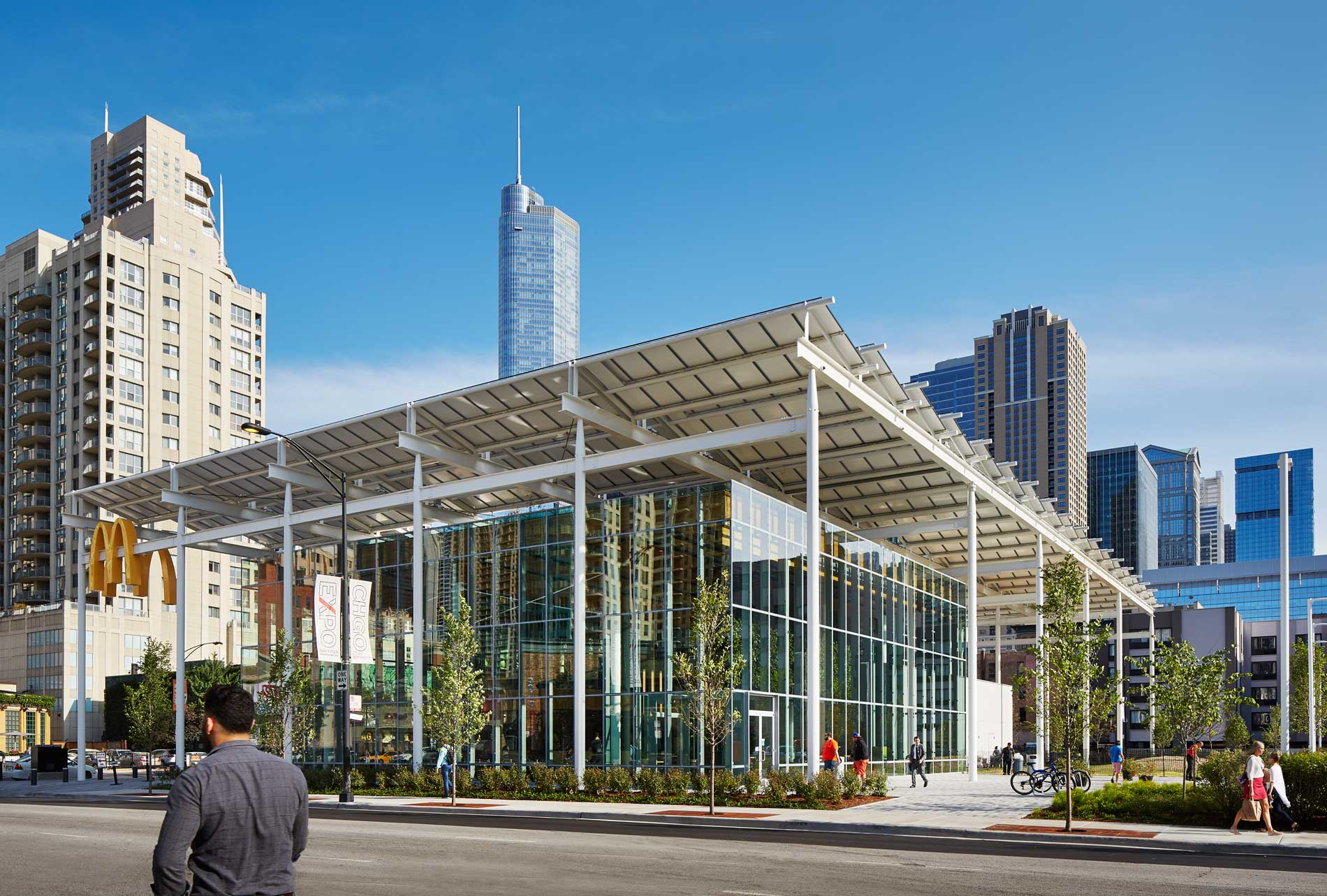
File:McDonald's_Chicago_Flagship.jpgThe McDonald's Chicago Flagship, Chicago, Illinois

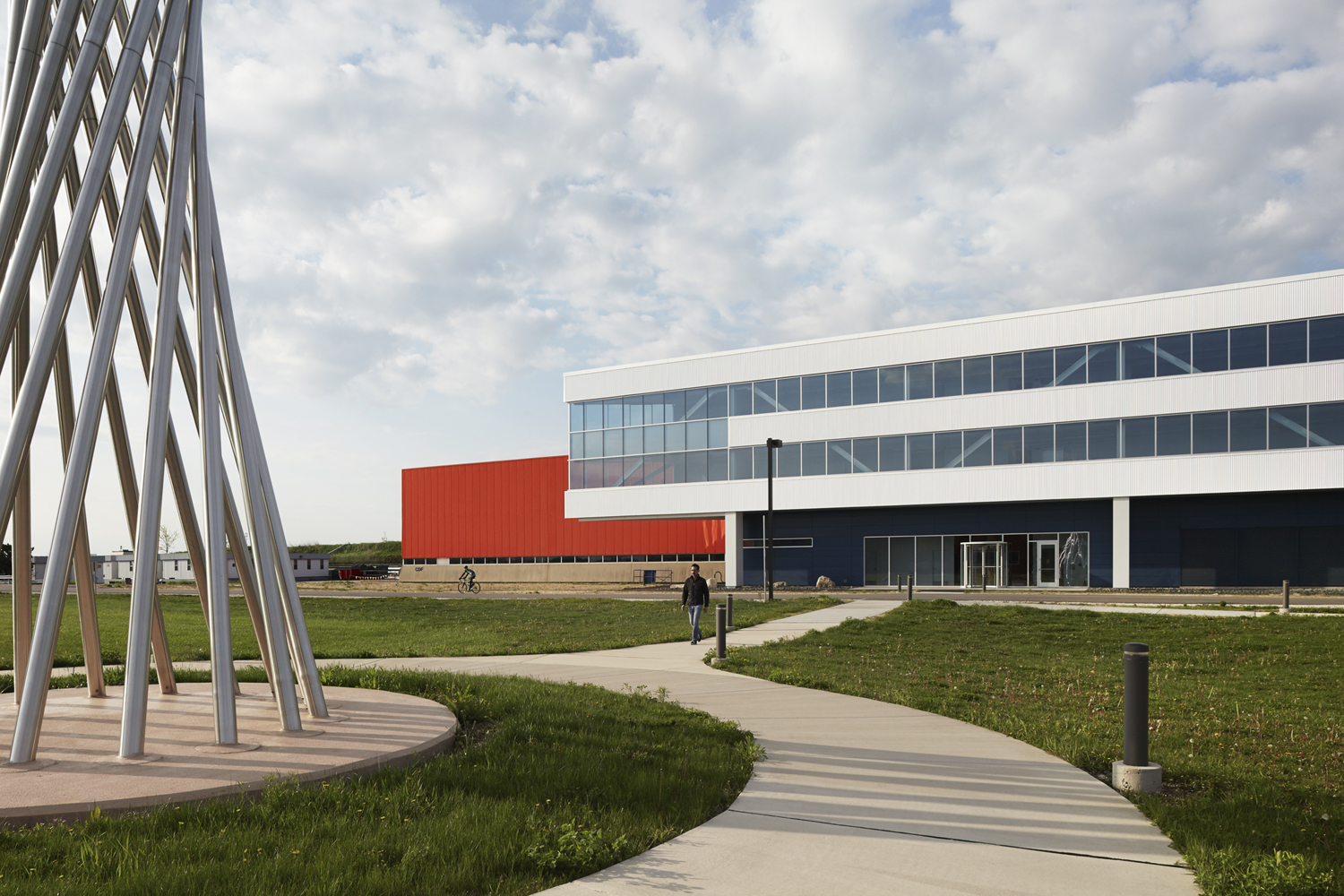
File:Fermilab_Office_Technical_and_Education_Building.jpgThe Fermilab Office Technical and Education Building, Batavia, Illinois

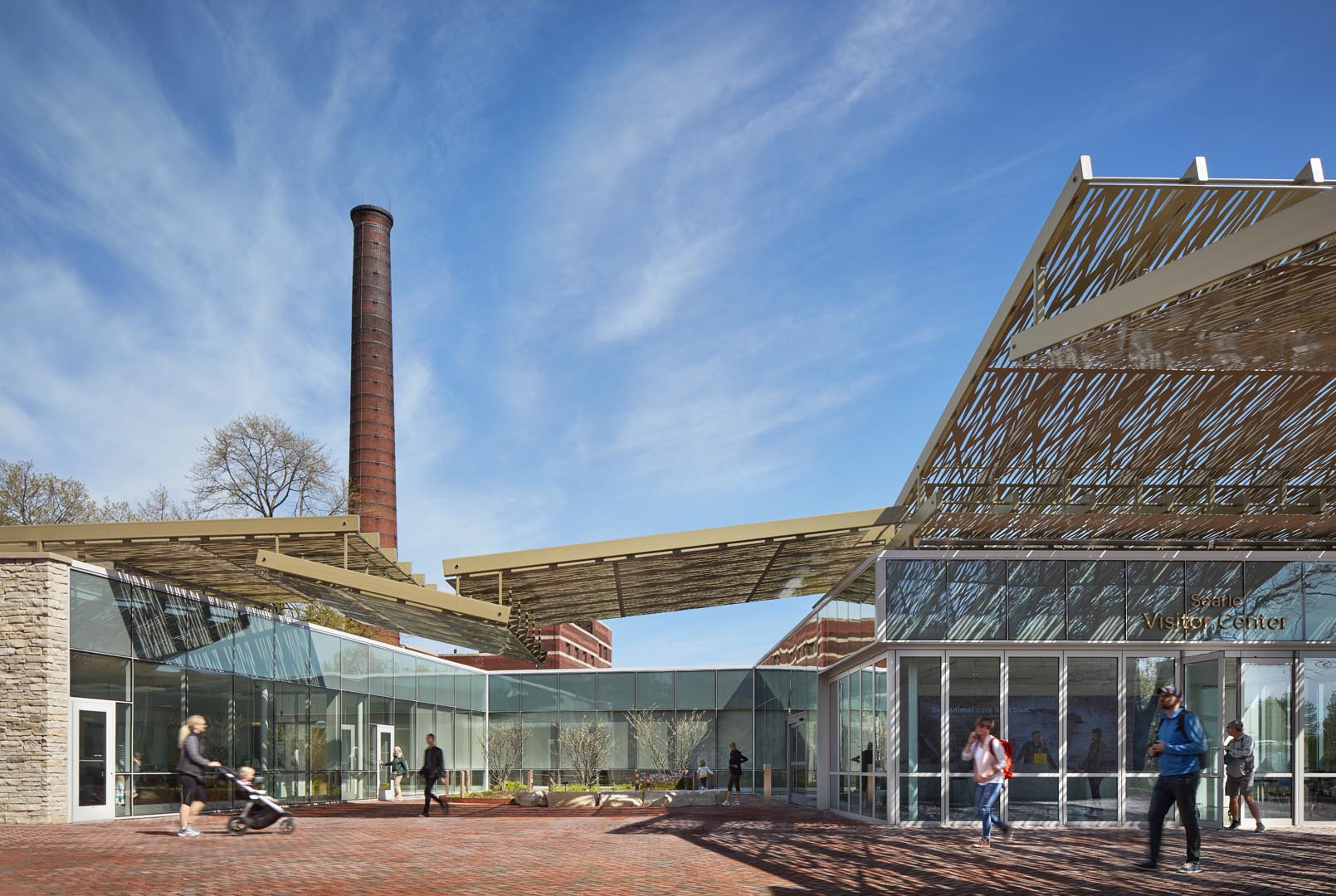
File:Lincoln_Park_Zoo's_Visitor_Center.jpgThe Lincoln Park Zoo's Visitor Center, Chicago Illinois

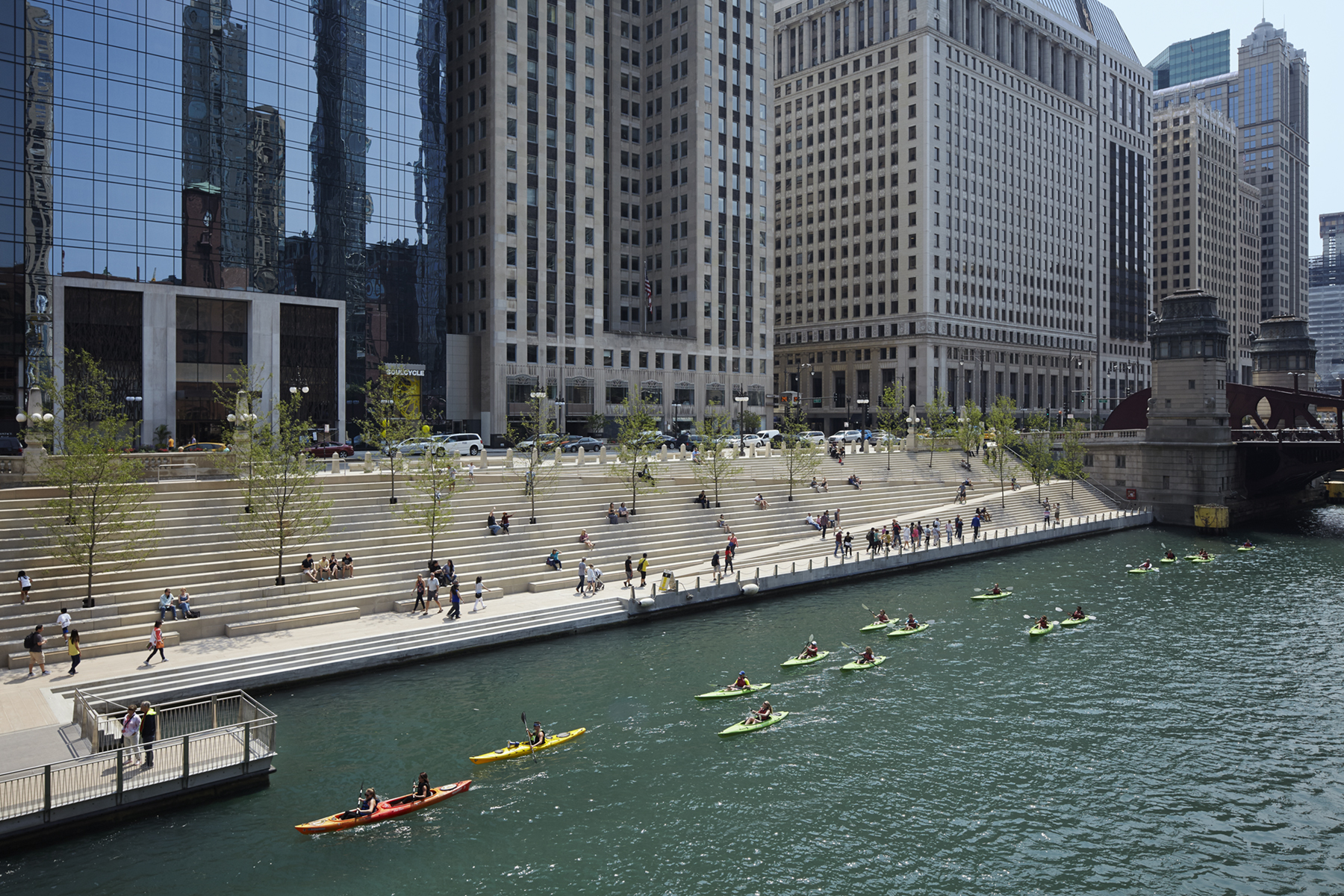
File:Chicago_Riverwalk.jpgThe Chicago Riverwalk

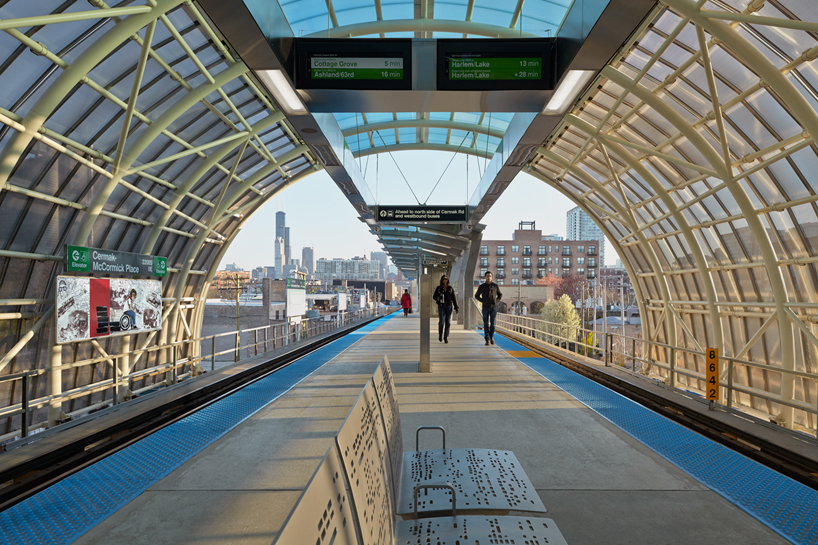
File:CTA_Cermak-McCormick_Station.jpgThe CTA Cermak-McCormick Station

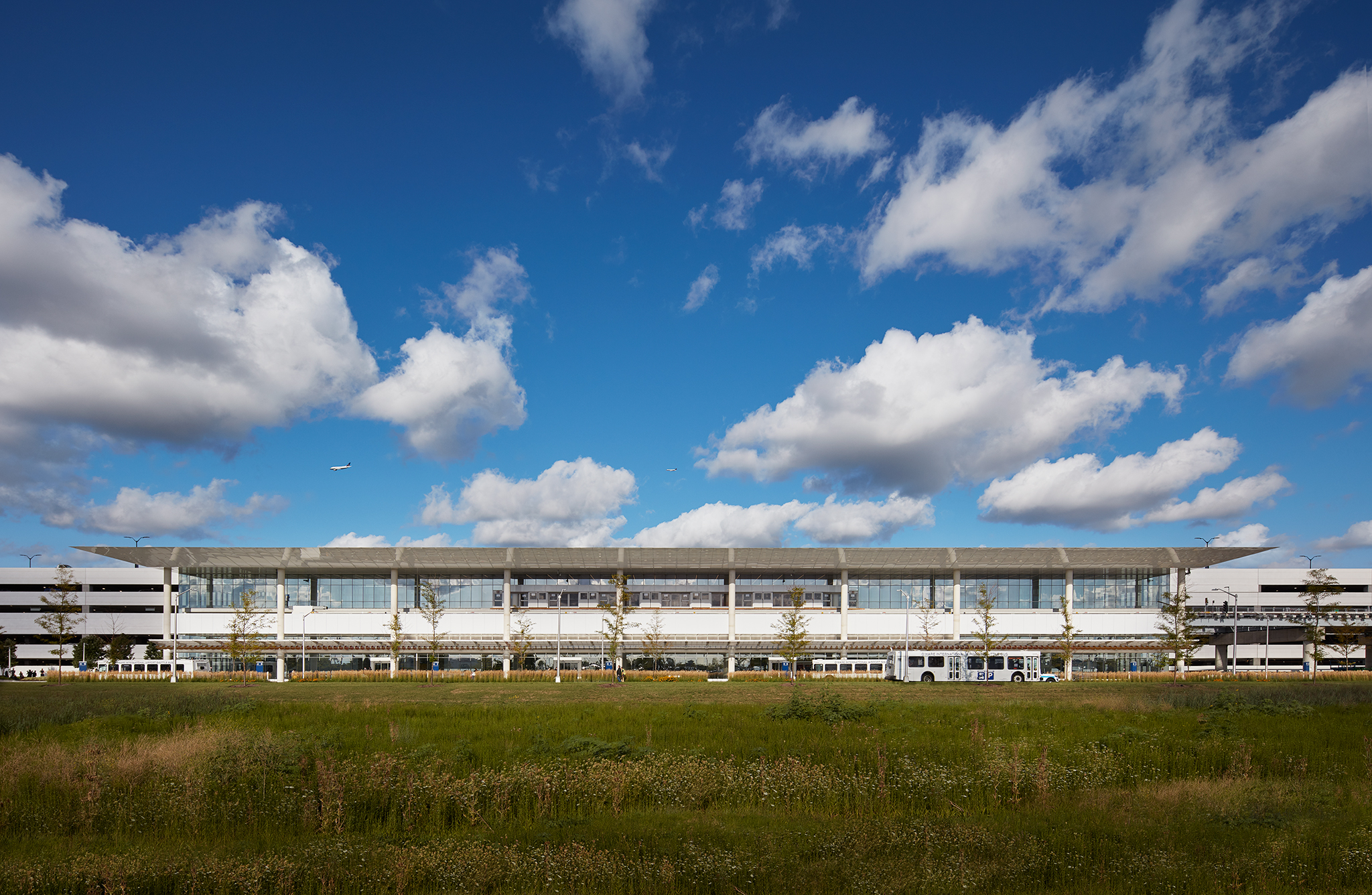
File:O'Hare_International_Airport_Multi-modal_Terminal.jpgThe O'Hare International Airport Multi-Modal Terminal

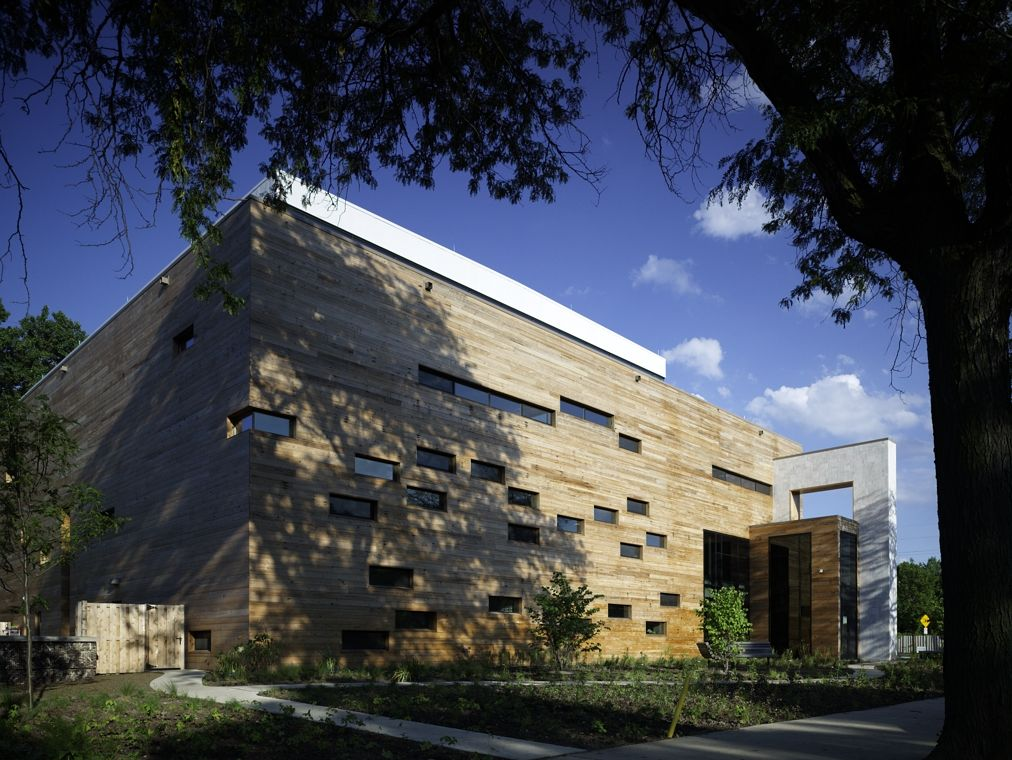
File:Jewish_Reconstructionist_Congregation_Synagogue.jpgThe Jewish Reconstructionist Synagogue, Chicago, Illinois

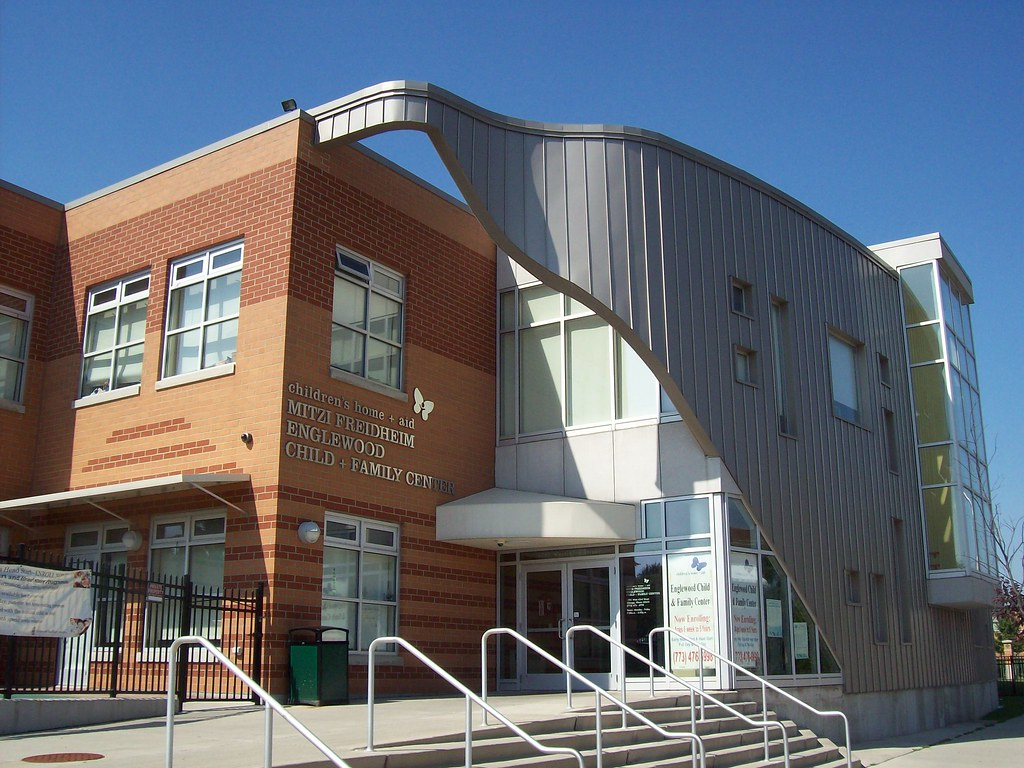
File:Mitzi_Friedheim_Child_and_Family_Center.jpgThe Mitzi Friedheim Child and Family Center, Chicago, Illinois

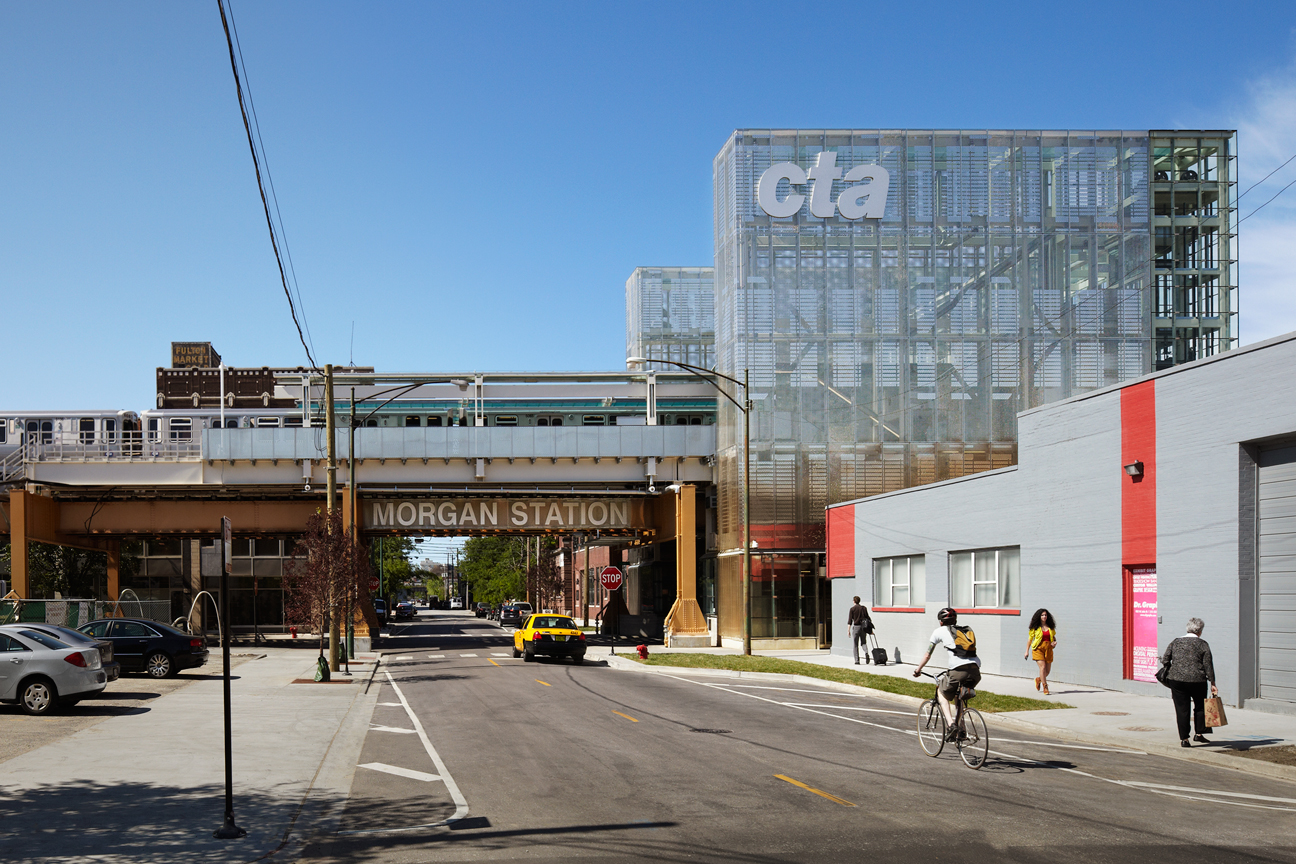
File:CTA_Morgan_Station.jpgCTA Morgan Station, Chicago Illinois

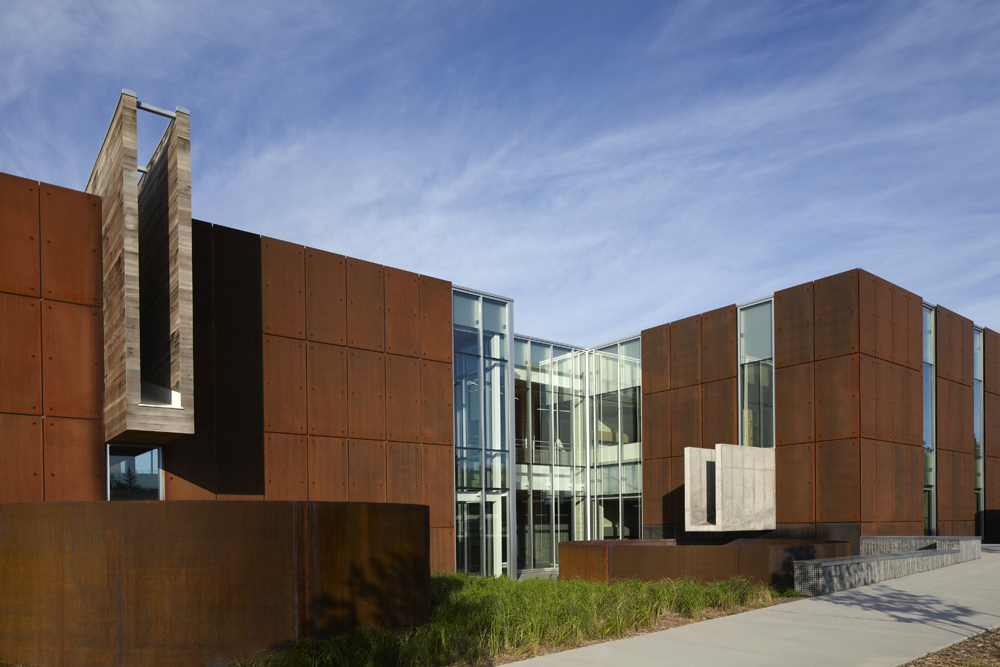
File:University_of_Minnesota-Duluth_James_I._Swenson_Civil_Engineering_Building.jpgThe James I. Swenson Civil Engineering Building at the University of Minnesota-Duluth
