= Champaign Public Library =

Library system in Champaign, Illinois, US

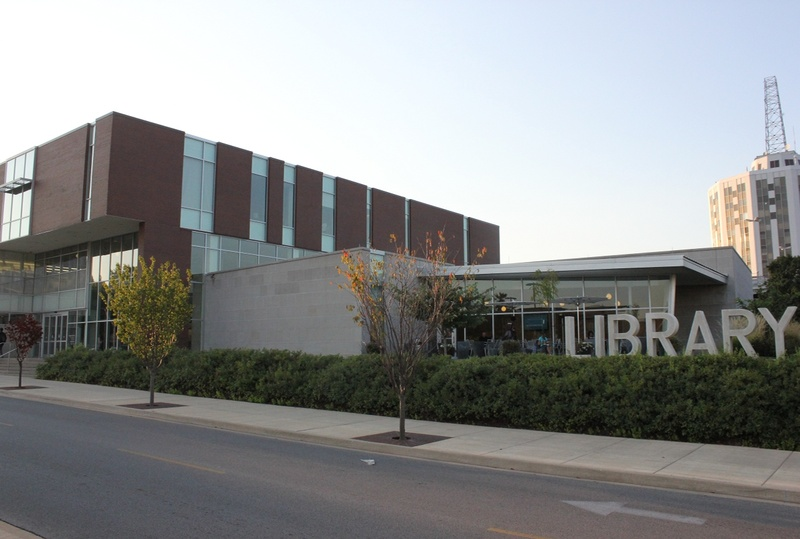
- View of Champaign Public Library from Randolph Street Entrance
- 40.111°N 88.246°W
- Location: 200 West Green Street; Champaign, Illinois; United States
- Type: Public library
- Established: 1876
- Branches: 2

Collection
- Size: 403,000 volumes (2022)

Access and use
- Circulation: 1.5 million
- Population served: 88,000
- Members: 26,000

Other information
- Budget: $8.2 million
- Director: Brittany Millington
- Website: www.champaign.org

The Champaign Public Library is a library system in Champaign, Illinois. It has two branches: the main library in downtown Champaign and its Douglass branch. With its new location opening on January 6, 2008, the Champaign Public Library almost tripled its square-footage and opened with a collection of almost 285,000 volumes.

== History ==
The Champaign Public Library traces its roots as a private, member-sustained group of readers in 1868. The small group of about forty members all paid dues to sustain their private collection of more than 300 volumes in a cozy reading room in downtown Champaign on Main Street. Ten years later in 1876, the group voted to dissolve itself in favor of enabling public access to their collection.

The public library was officially created by the City Council on July 21, 1876, and budgeted $1,000 for the library. When the library opened it had almost 750 volumes in its collection.

In 1894, Champaign banker and philanthropist A.C. Burnham announced a substantial gift of $50,000 for a new library as a memorial to his wife, Julia Finley Burnham, a former member of the library board. Of the total, $40,000 was for the site and building and $10,000 was for a book endowment. The Burnham Athenaeum at 306 W. Church Street opened on December 17, 1896, with two librarians and 5,593 books. When it closed, the same building was bursting at the seams with forty employees and over 100,000 items.

An approximately 40,000-square-foot Main Library at 505 S. Randolph Street was dedicated in November 1977. Designed by Hammond Beeby and Associates of Chicago, the building was funded largely by a $2.3 million referendum.

In 2008, the library expanded to a new location and replaced the 31-year-old building that the community had outgrown. The new building, designed by Ross Barney Architects of Chicago, Illinois, contains 121,000 square feet of new and improved space.

== Main Library ==
Construction for the new library building began in 2005 and it opened for public use in 2008.

=== Library awards ===
In 2013, the library received the following awards from the Library Leadership and Management Association (a division of the American Library Association):

- Best of Show, Annual Reports
- Best of Show, Special Programs & Events
- Best of Show, Webpage/Homepage
- Honorable Mention, Adult & Family Reading Club Materials / One Book Materials
- Honorable Mention, Fundraising Materials

In 2014, the library was awarded a John Cotton Dana Library Public Relations Award for the "Show Some Library Love" fundraising campaign. The national honor includes a prize of $10,000.

=== Design awards ===
Below are awards the library has received based upon its design and state-of-the-art engineering.

- AIA Central Illinois Architecture Design Honor Award, awarded to Ross Barney Architects (2008)
- American Council of Engineering Companies of Illinois (ACEC-IL) Special Achievement Award, and American Institute of Architects (AIA) Central Illinois Honor Award for Architecture, for engineering design of the library, awarded to Henneman Engineering (2009)
- American Institute of Architects, Chicago Chapter, Design Excellence Awards, Honor Award (highest distinction) for Interior Architecture, awarded to Ross Barney Architects (2009)
- Brick Industry Association Brick in Architecture Awards, Silver Award (2009)
- American Institute of Architects, Illinois State Component, Frank Lloyd Wright Honor Award. This award recognizes an individual building that enhances the natural and built environment of a community.

== Douglass Branch Library ==
Originally organized as a joint project between Champaign and neighboring Urbana in 1970, the Douglass branch was located within a single room at the Douglass Community Center on North Sixth Street in Champaign. By 1972, the branch was absorbed by the Champaign Public Library and was relocated to a small building on Bradley Avenue until June 1997, where the branch currently operates on East Grove Street in Champaign by neighboring Douglass Park. Both the library and the park are named after abolitionist and journalist Frederick Douglass. After escaping slavery in Maryland, Douglass became a noted advocate for equality among all people and lectured in Champaign at least once while traveling north.
