= Sasaki (company) =

American landscape architecture firm

- Founded: 1953
- Founder: Hideo Sasaki
- Headquarters: United States
- Area served: International
- Services: Architecture; Interior Design; Planning and Urban Design; Space Planning; Landscape Architecture; Ecology; Civil Engineering; Place Branding
- Website: http://www.sasaki.com/

Sasaki is a design firm specializing in Architecture, Interior Design, Urban Design, Space Planning, Landscape Architecture, Ecology, Civil Engineering, and Place Branding. The firm is headquartered in Boston, Massachusetts, but practices on an international scale, with offices in Shanghai, and Denver, Colorado, and clients and projects globally.

== History ==
Sasaki was founded in 1953 by landscape architect Hideo Sasaki while he served as a professor and landscape architecture chair at the Harvard Graduate School of Design. Sasaki was founded upon collaborative, interdisciplinary design, unprecedented in design practice at the time, and an emphasis on the integration of land, buildings, people, and their contexts.

Through the mid- to late-1900s, Sasaki designed plazas (including Copley Square), corporate parks, college campuses, and master plans, among other projects.

The firm includes a team of in house designers, software developers, and data analysts who support the practice. As of 2019, Sasaki had over 300 employees across its diverse practice areas and between its two offices. The firm engages in a wide variety of project types, across its many disciplines.

== Milestones ==
In 2000, in honor of the passing of the firm's founder, the family of Hideo Sasaki together with Sasaki and other financial supporters, established the Sasaki Foundation. The foundation, which is a separate entity from Sasaki, gives yearly grants, supporting community-led research at Sasaki. In 2012, Sasaki opened an office in Shanghai to support the firm's work in China and the larger Asia Pacific region.

In 2018, Sasaki opened the Incubator, a coworking space designed by and located within the Sasaki campus, which houses the Sasaki Foundation as curator of programming. The 5,000 square-foot space is home to several like-minded non-profits, organizations, and individuals.

In 2020, Sasaki established a new office in Denver, Colorado, marking the firm's third physical studio location.

== Awards and recognition ==
In 2007, Sasaki was honored as the American Society of Landscape Architects firm of the year. In 2012, Sasaki won the American Planning Association firm of the year award.

Sasaki has earned numerous consecutive Pierre L'Enfant International Planning awards from the American Planning Association. In 2017, two of the five annual finalists for the Rudy Bruner Award for Urban Excellence were Sasaki projects: the Bruce C. Bolling Municipal Building (Boston, MA) and the Chicago Riverwalk both were recognized as silver medalists. Sasaki has been named a top 50 firm by Architect Magazine numerous times.

The firm has been recognized by the Boston Society of Landscape Architects (BSLA), Boston Society of Architects (BSA), American Planning Association (APA), American Institute of Architecture (AIA), Society for College and University Planning (SCUP), Urban Land Initiative (ULI), Dezeen, and Fast Company, among others.

== Research ==
Notable Sasaki-sponsored research projects include Sea-Change Boston (2016 ASLA Honor Award), Shifting Gears: An Urbanist's take on autonomous vehicles (2019 Fast Company honorable mention), Understanding Homelessness, and Where Design Meets Play.

== Select projects ==
Sasaki has a large portfolio of work, which includes:

- 401 Congress Street; Boston, MA
- 2008 Beijing Olympic Green; Beijing, China
- 798 Arts District Plan; Beijing, China
- Bell Labs Holmdel Complex; Holmdel, NJ
- Bonnet Springs Park; Lakeland, FL
- Boston City Hall Plaza; Boston, MA
- Bruce C. Bolling Building (with Mecanoo Architecten); Boston, MA
- Charleston Waterfront Park; Charleston, SC
- Chengdu Panda Reserve; Chengdu, China
- Chicago Riverwalk; Chicago, IL (Phases 2 and 3)
- Clemson University Core Campus Dining Facility; Clemson, SC
- Dar Ul-aman and Massoud Corridor Districts; Kabul, Afghanistan
- Denver Airport Strategic Plan; Denver, CO
- Georgetown University Pedro Arrupe, S.J. Hall; Washington D.C.
- Greenwich Academy Masterplan; Greenwich, CT
- The Lawrenceville School Masterplan and Implementation; Lawrenceville NJ
- Lincoln Memorial Landscape and Reflecting Pool; Washington D.C.
- Microsoft New England Research and Development Center (NERD); Cambridge, MA
- Middlebury College Virtue Fieldhouse; Middlebury, VT
- Nord Family Greenway; Cleveland, OH
- Sacred Heart University Martire Business and Communications Center; Fairfield, CT
- Salisbury University Patricia R Guerrieri Academic Commons; Salisbury, MD
- Smale Riverfront Park; Cincinnati, OH
- The Incubator at Sasaki; Watertown, MA
- The Lawn on D; Boston, MA
- Tecnologico de Monterrey new main library; Monterrey, Nuevo León, Mexico
- Universidad de Lima Masterplan; Lima, Peru
- University of Washington Campus Master Plan and Innovation District Framework; Seattle, WA
- Virginia Polytechnic Institute and State University Master Plan Update; Blacksburg, VA
- Wolverine Worldwide; Waltham, MA
- Wuhan Yangtze Riverfront Park; Wuhan, China
- Zidell Yards Masterplan; Portland, OR

== Gallery ==
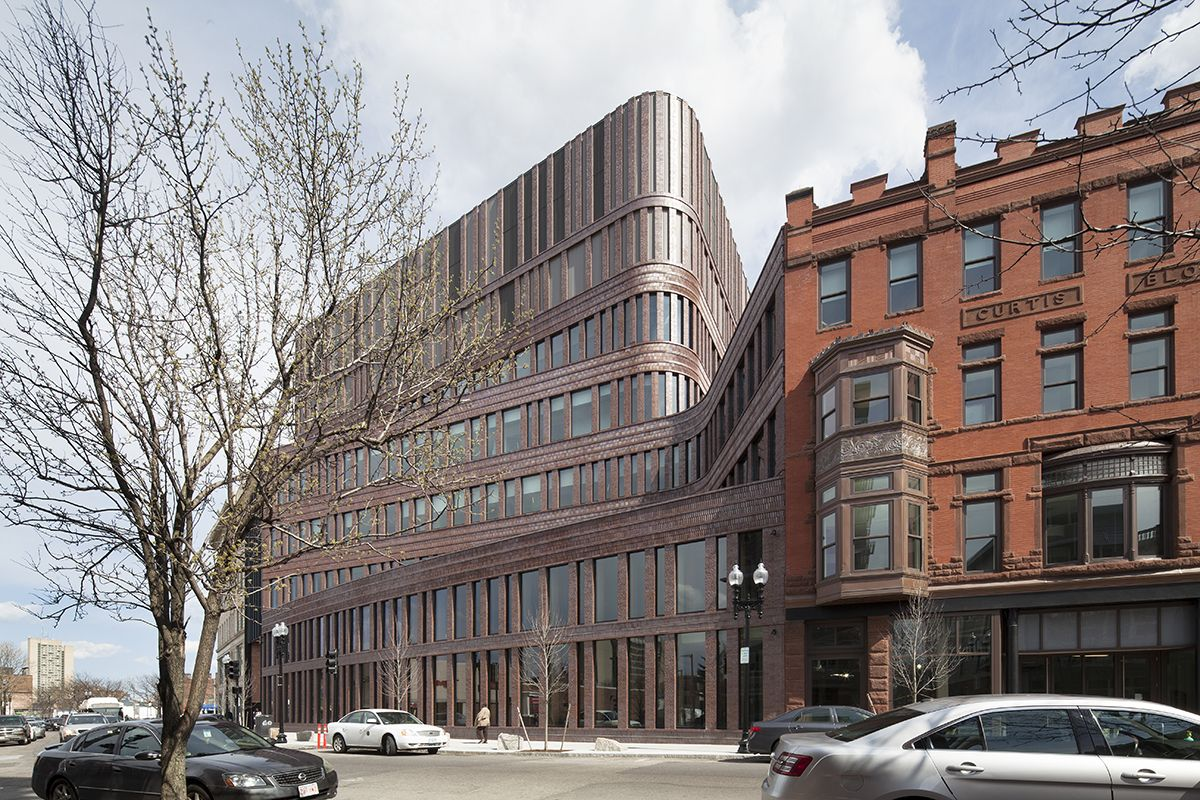
Bruce C Bolling Building (with Mecanoo Architecten); Boston, MA

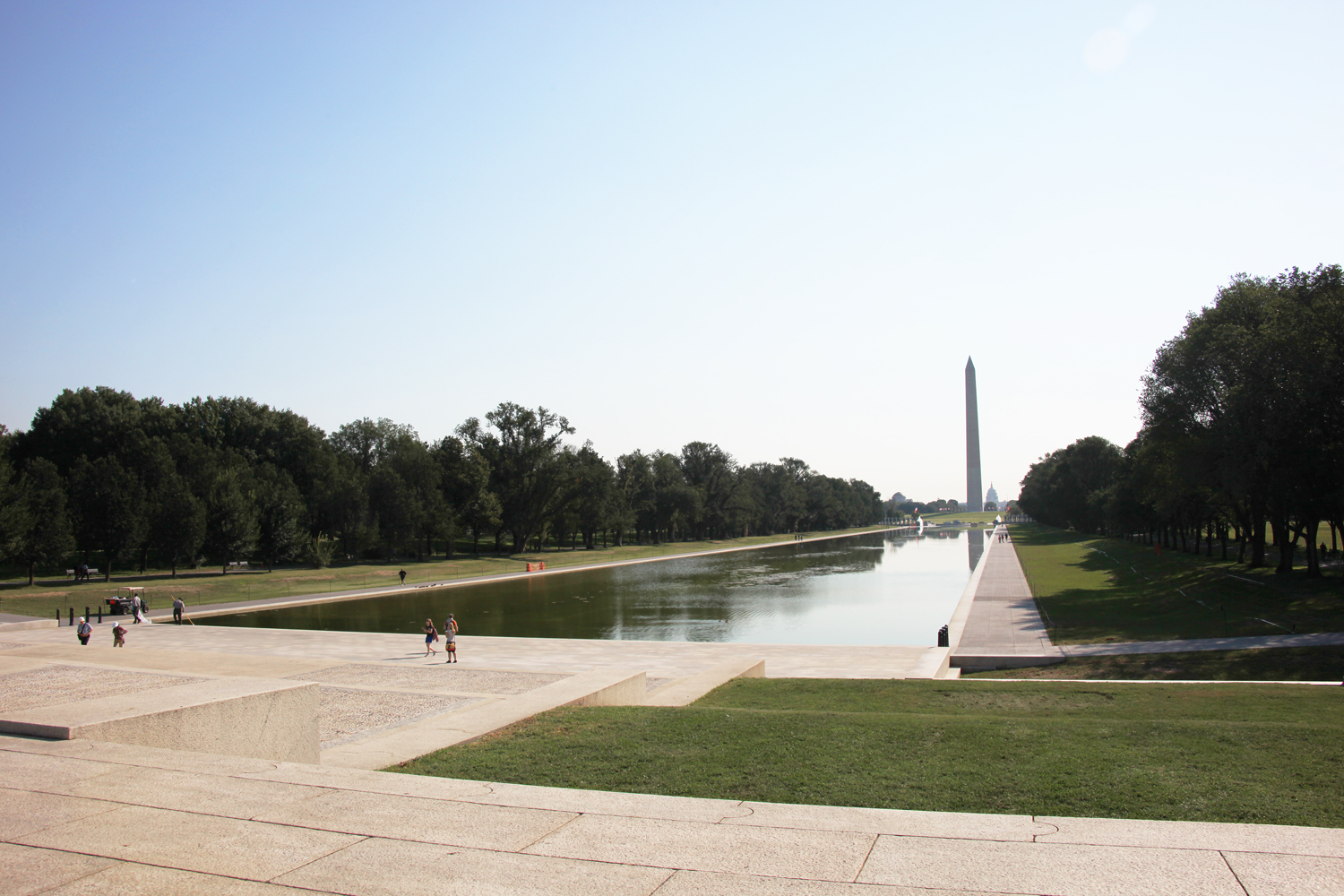
Lincoln Memorial Landscape and Reflecting Pool; Washington D.C.

Bonnet Springs Park; Lakeland, FL

Chengdu Panda Reserve; Chengdu, China

Universidad de Lima Masterplan; Lima, Peru

Wuhan Yangtze Riverfront Park; Wuhan, China

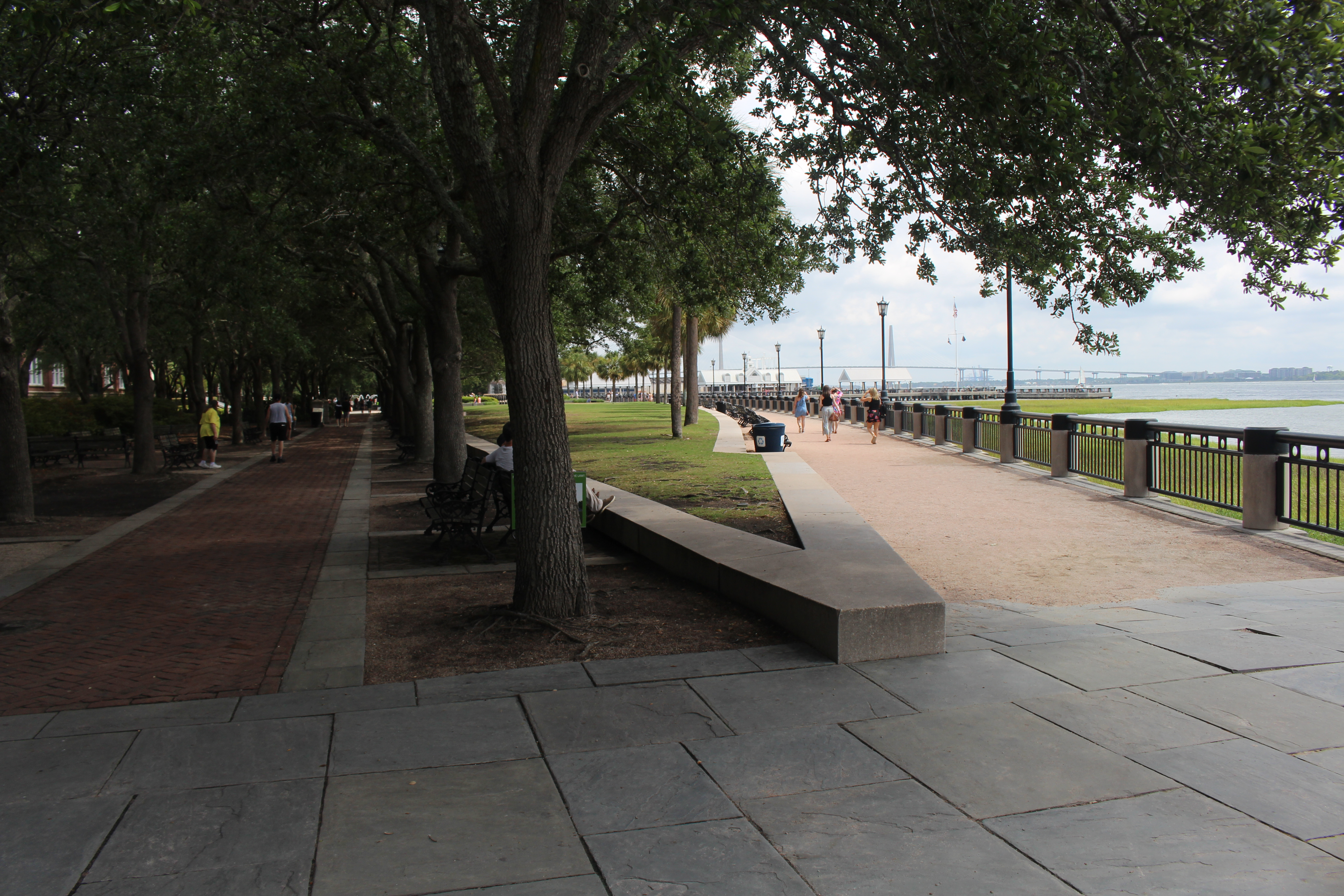
Charleston Waterfront Park; Charleston, SC
