= Chicago Riverwalk =

Public space in Chicago, Illinois

Coordinates: 41.8883°N 87.6218°W

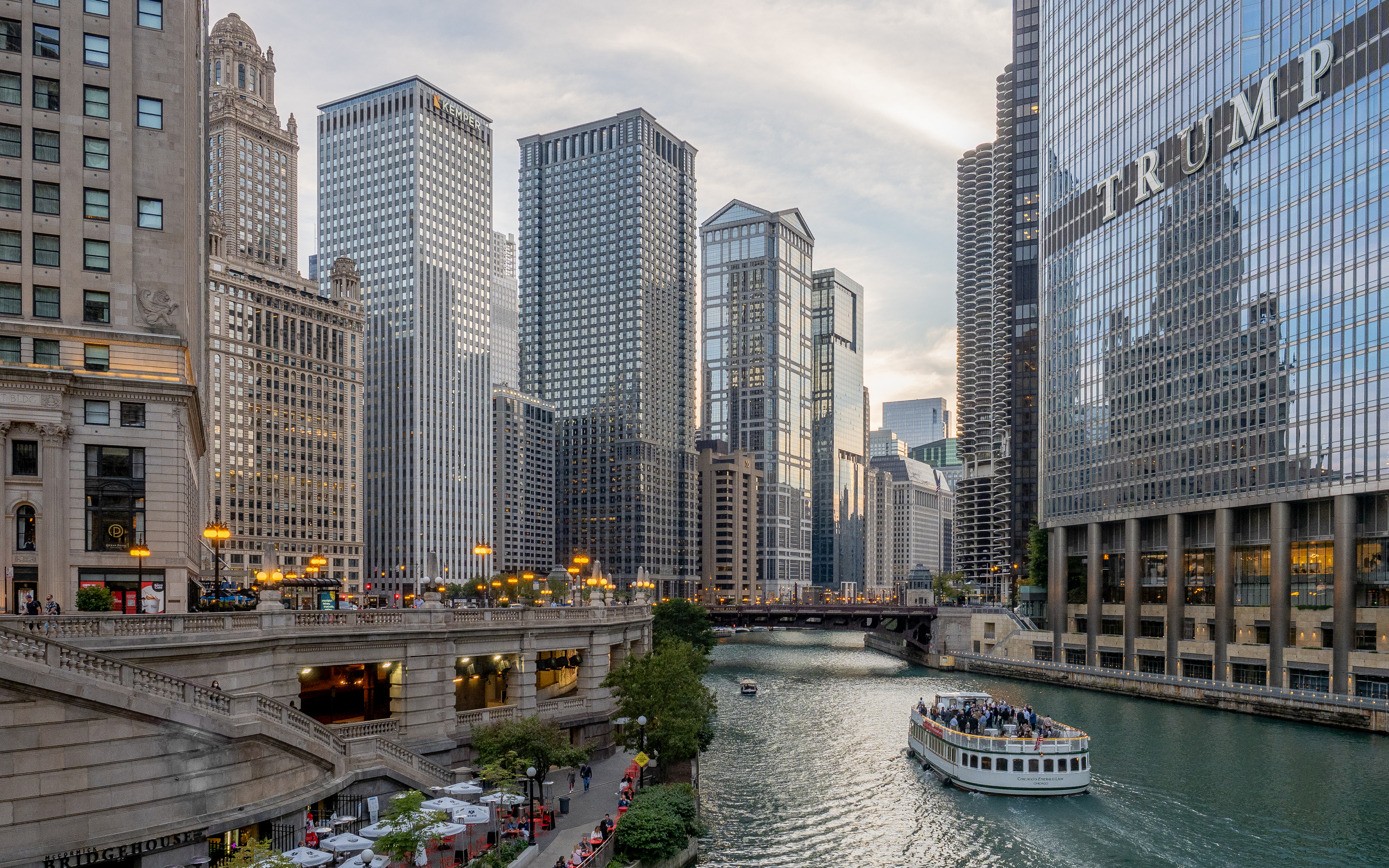
Chicago Riverwalk as seen in September 2021

The Chicago Riverwalk is a multi-use public open space located on the south bank of the main branch of the Chicago River in Chicago, extending from Lake Michigan and the Outer Drive Bridge westward to the Wolf Point area and Lake Street. The Chicago Riverwalk contains restaurants, bars, cafes, small parks, boat and kayak rentals, a Vietnam War memorial, and other amenities.

== 2001–2005 ==
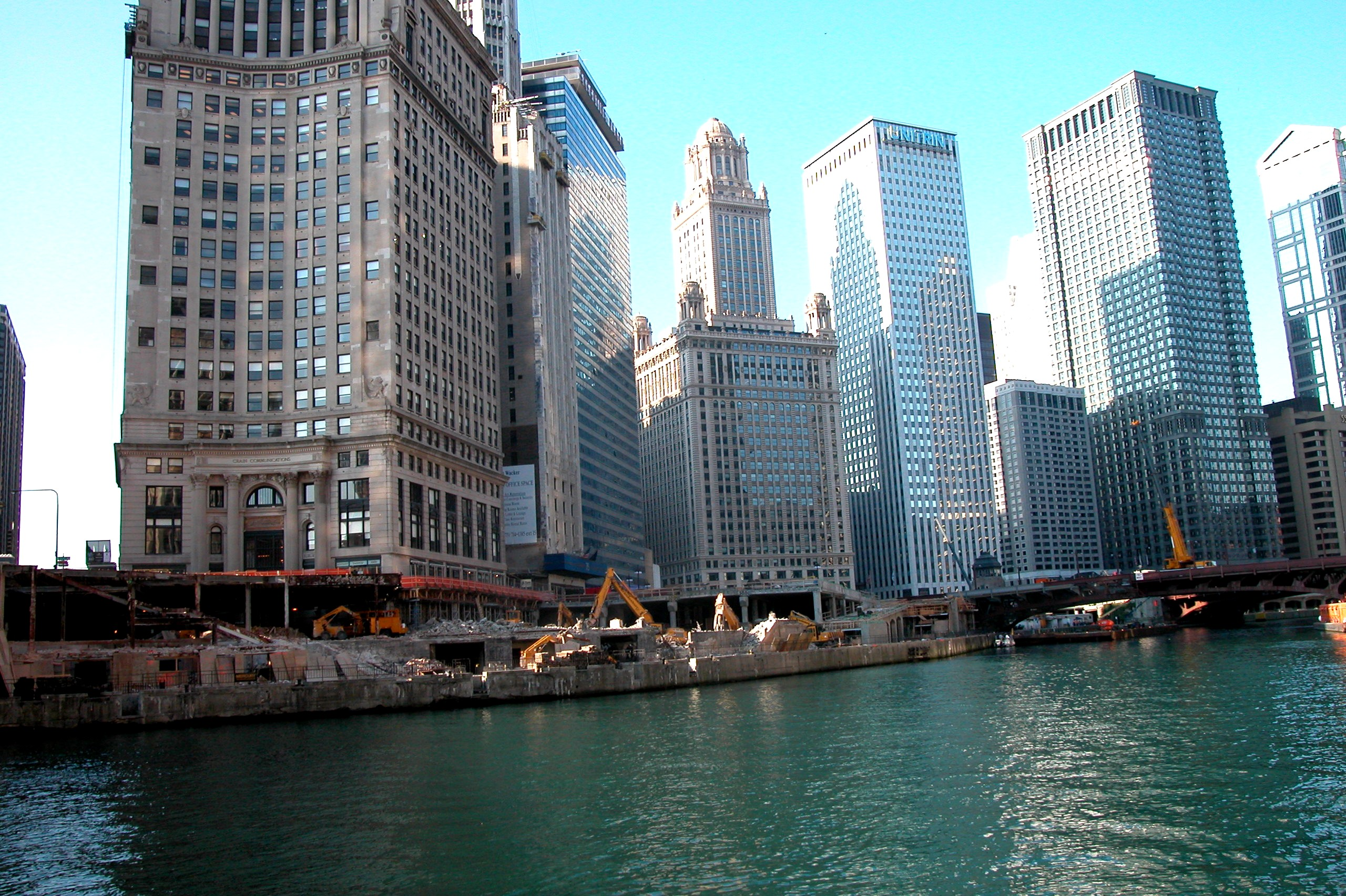
The Chicago Riverwalk under construction in 2002

In conjunction with the Chicago Department of Transportation, construction of the Riverwalk began in 2001 as an extension of the Wacker Drive reconstruction project. With the rebuilding of Wacker Drive, the street was purposely relocated to allow for development of the walk. The oldest section now called Market, between Lake Shore Drive and Michigan Avenue was at first an extension of the lake shore trail with tour boat docks, concessions and stair access. Sections at first required going up to street and bridge level to access the next section, until design plans and funding could be arranged over time.

The plan developed by architects at Skidmore, Owings and Merrill called for four separate districts within the riverwalk: Confluence, Arcade, Civic and Market, all with a specific location and theme in mind.

- Confluence: Located where the Main, North and South branches of the River intersect. Previously the location of taverns, hotels and convention centers, it is now a major intersection of not only the River but the neighborhoods that border it. This area of the Riverwalk was expanded fifty feet into the river for the installation of park space and pedestrian access to Upper Wacker Drive as well as various amenities located in this area.
- Arcade: The District spanning east from Franklin to State Street. It is called the "Arcade" because of the architectural detailing that separates the riverfront from the rest of the Wacker Drive.
- Civic: The District spanning east from Dearborn St. to Michigan Ave. It includes the Chicago Bridgehouse Museum, located at Michigan Ave. and Wacker Dr., and is also the focal point for visitor and tourist activities, primarily for the boat launches. The Trump International Tower and Hotel is also located along this stretch of the Riverwalk, as well as notable landmarks such as the Wrigley Building and the Tribune Tower.
- Market: The District spanning from Columbus Dr. (including Stetson St.) east to Lake Shore Drive. Location of Chicago's First Lady boat launch as well as a beautifully landscaped space that contrasts with the other districts while walking east toward the lakeshore. This area also includes a restaurant, Cyrano's and a residential community: Lakeshore East.

== 2005–2012 ==
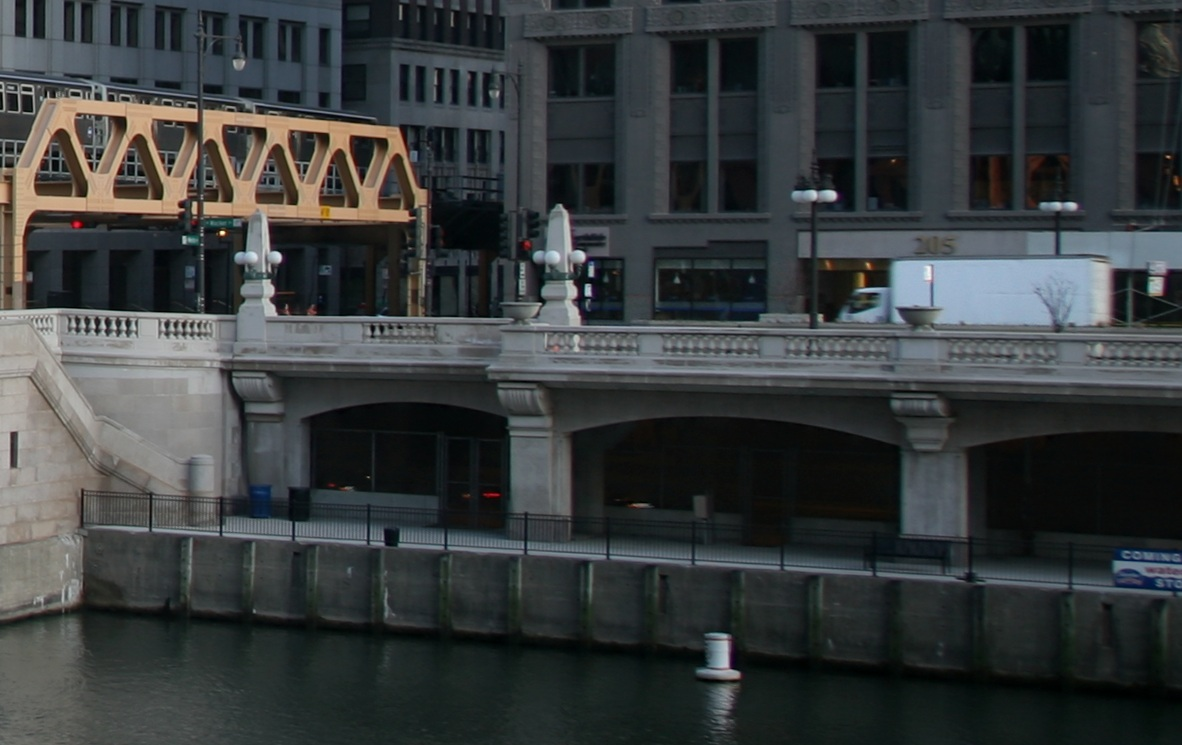
Chicago Riverwalk in front of 205 West Wacker Drive at Wells St. bridge in 2009

At State and Wabash Streets where the Riverwalk is at its widest is the Vietnam Veterans Memorial Plaza, commemorating events that took place during that war. Designed by Ross Barney Architects and built in 2005, it is nestled within the Riverwalk and consists of a terraced lawn, a waterfall and a central pool. The Chicago Vietnam Veterans' Memorial Plaza, one of the largest in the nation outside of Washington, D.C., connects people to the riverfront, provides an escape from the steel and glass of the city, and bejewels the city's waterfront. Its public objectives and finished forms embody what a memorial plaza should be; a remembrance of those that served, and a celebration of the living. The plaza occupies land, reclaimed by the rebuilding and relocation of Wacker Drive, to create an urban park, with terraces and bench-lined ramps that gently transition from busy city streets to more quiet spaces near the river, providing a green refuge.

Plans were announced to deploy the full intention of a connected path from Lake Michigan west toward Lake Street. Ross Barney Architects was again charged with envisioning this extension. Phase 01 was completed in 2009 with under-bridge canopies and new landscaping added south of State Street.

== 2012–present ==
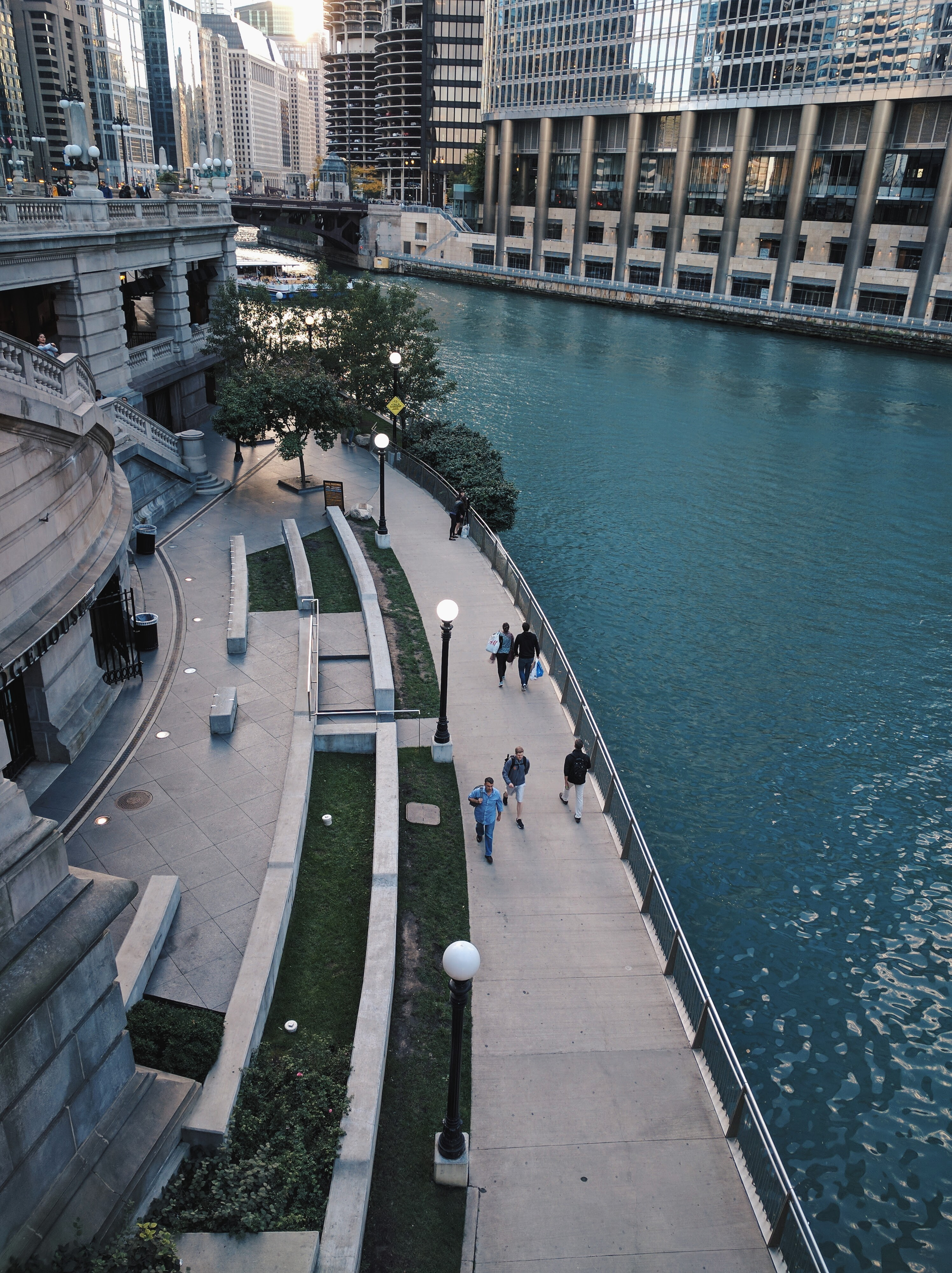
Chicago Riverwalk from DuSable Bridge on Michigan Avenue in 2016

On October 8, 2012, Mayor Rahm Emanuel unveiled plans for an addition to the Riverwalk, extending it another six blocks along Chicago's River from State to Lake streets. Phases Two and Three of the Riverwalk, a collaborative design effort between Sasaki and Ross Barney Architects, links a series of six distinct civic spaces or "rooms", each named for its unique program. Floating gardens, a bridge and fishing piers aim to create more recreational options for the city's "Second Lakefront," and connect the downtown area. As of early summer 2015, three of the rooms were finished, completing Phase Two: the Marina (food vendors and seating to watch watercraft), the Cove (boating and kayak rentals), and the River Theater (amphitheater seating and a link to Upper Wacker Drive). Phase Three, the final three blocks, is planned to be completed by the end of 2016.

In June 2015, The Marina Plaza, The Cove, and The River Theater sections of the Riverwalk from State Street to LaSalle Street was officially opened.

The city has been working on the development plan for the Chicago Riverwalk since the 1990s. During the reconstruction of east–west Wacker Drive, the roadway was reconfigured to allow greater public access to the river. The city received Congressional approval to redefine the navigational channel allowing the build-out of the path 20 feet under each bridge and 25 feet between each bridge and 50 feet between Franklin and Lake Street in order to extend the Riverwalk.

The City obtained $98 million for design engineering and construction from the U.S. Department of Transportation through the Transportation Infrastructure Finance and Innovation Act. The remaining phase along the south bank of the river from Lake Street to State Street was connected to the previously completed section of the Riverwalk.

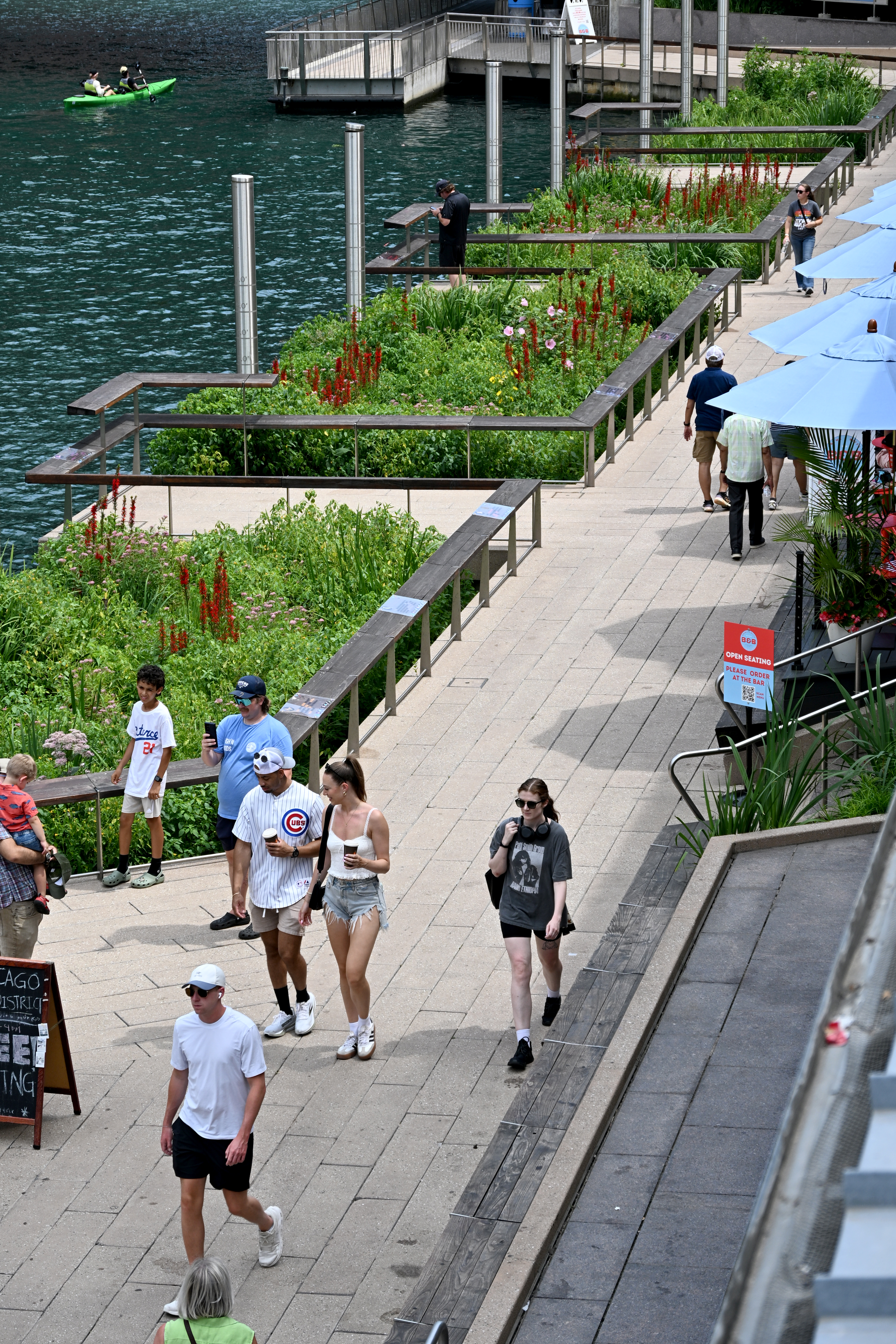
The Jetty in 2025.

In October 2016, The Water Plaza, The Jetty, and The Boardwalk sections from LaSalle Street to Lake Street opened to the public.

The city has a $10M renovation plan of the Riverwalk east of State Street. This includes new landscaping, seating, play areas, and walkways.

The Riverwalk is one of several mega and large scale development projects over the last several years either completed, under construction, or planned in Chicago. Others include the 606, Lincoln Yards, The 78, One Chicago, Wolf Point Towers, Tribune East Tower, Bronzeville Lakefront, One Central, a city casino, an $8.5 billion revamp of O'Hare International Airport, an extension of the Red Line subway/elevated train, and the Barack Obama Presidential Center among other projects.

== Chicago Riverwalk expansion sections ==
- The Marina Plaza: This area provides restaurants, outdoor seating, and boat access.
- The Cove: This area provides access for docking of human-powered craft such as kayaks and canoes.
- The River Theater: This area has a sculptural staircase linking Upper Wacker Drive and the Riverwalk. It has seating and is shaded by trees.
- The Water Plaza: Originally named the Swimming Hole, this area features a zero-depth fountain.
- The Jetty: This area has a series of piers and floating wetland gardens. It offers an interactive learning environment about the ecology of the river, including opportunities for fishing and identifying native plants.
- The Boardwalk: This area is an accessible walkway and lawn area and has continuous access to Lake Street.

== See also ==
- Corniche Beirut
- Waterfront Park (Charleston)
