= Ross Barney Architects =

American architectural firm

Practice information
- Key architects: Carol Ross Barney
- Founded: 1981
- Location: Chicago, Illinois

Ross Barney Architects is an architectural firm founded in 1981 by Carol Ross Barney in Chicago, Illinois.

== History ==
Organized in February 1981 as Carol Ross Barney Architects, the firm served clients with cultural and social agendas but not necessarily high profile, big budgets. These clients were similar to those founder Carol Ross Barney had worked with at Holabird and Root. In 1982, Jim Jankowski, FAIA, a college classmate of Carol's, joined the fledgling practice and the name changed to Ross Barney + Jankowski from 1984-2006.

The Cesar Chavez Multicultural Academic Center, completed in 1989, and Little Village Academy, completed in 1996, are early works of community conscious design. Today both schools have remained neighborhood sanctuaries virtually devoid of gang sponsored graffiti.

In 1997, the firm was chosen to design the Oklahoma City Federal Building. Following the attack on the Alfred P. Murrah Federal Building in 1995, the General Services Administration was tasked with developing standards for the protection of government buildings. The new building was both the philosophical and practical response to the tragedy. In 2005, Carol Ross Barney was awarded the Thomas Jefferson Award from the American Institute of Architects for her distinguished portfolio of public work.

In 2008, the Jewish Reconstructionist Congregation Synagogue in Evanston, Illinois, was the first house of worship to receive the highest LEED certification achievable by a building.

Throughout the studio's history, a focus on transportation infrastructure has evolved, allowing them to look for sustainable solutions at an urban scale. The Morgan Street Station for the Chicago Transit Authority (CTA) is the first new inter system station constructed in more than thirty years. This acute understanding has led to designs for the Cermak McCormick Place CTA station and the multi-phase expansion of the Chicago Riverwalk.

== Selected projects ==
- Chicago Riverwalk, In Progress, Chicago, Illinois
- Ohio State University South Campus Chiller Plant, Completed 2013, Columbus, Ohio
- Chicago Transit Authority CTA Morgan Street, Completed 2012, Chicago, Illinois
- University of Minnesota Duluth, James I Swenson Civil Engineering Building, Completed 2010, Duluth, Minnesota
- Jewish Reconstructionist Congregation, Completed 2008, Evanston, Illinois
- Oklahoma City Federal Building, Completed 2005, Oklahoma City, Oklahoma

== Selected awards ==
- World Architecture Festival, Category Commendation, Transport, CTA Morgan Street Station, 2013
- AIA/COTE Top Ten Green Projects, UMD James I Swenson Civil Engineering Building, 2013
- World Architecture Festival, Category Commendation, Community, Jewish Reconstructionist Congregation, 2009
- General Services Administration, Design Award, Oklahoma City Federal Building, 2006
- American Institute of Architects, Honor Award for Architecture, Little Village Academy, 2002
- American Institute of Architects, Honor Award for Interior Architecture, Little Village Academy, 1999
- American Institute of Architects, Honor Award for Architecture, Cesar Chavez Multicultural Center, 1994
- National Endowment for the Arts, Federal Design Achievement Award, 1992
- American Institute of Architects, Honor Award for Architecture, Glendale Heights Post Office, 1991

== Exhibitions ==
- Jewish Museum New York and San Francisco, Reinventing Ritual: Contemporary Art and Design for Jewish Life, 2009
- Thresholds Along the Frontier: Contemporary U.S. Border Stations, 2006
- Chicago Architecture Foundation, 5 Architects, 2005
- National Building Museum, Future Design Now! The 2000 General Services Administration Design Awards, 2001
- Museum of Contemporary Art Chicago, Material Evidence, 2000
- Ispace, Gallery of the School of Fine and Applied Arts, University of Illinois at Urbana-Champaign, People + Places: The Work of Carol Ross Barney, 1999
- Art Institute of Chicago, Permanent Collection
