= Waterfront Park (Charleston) =

Park in Charleston, South Carolina, United States

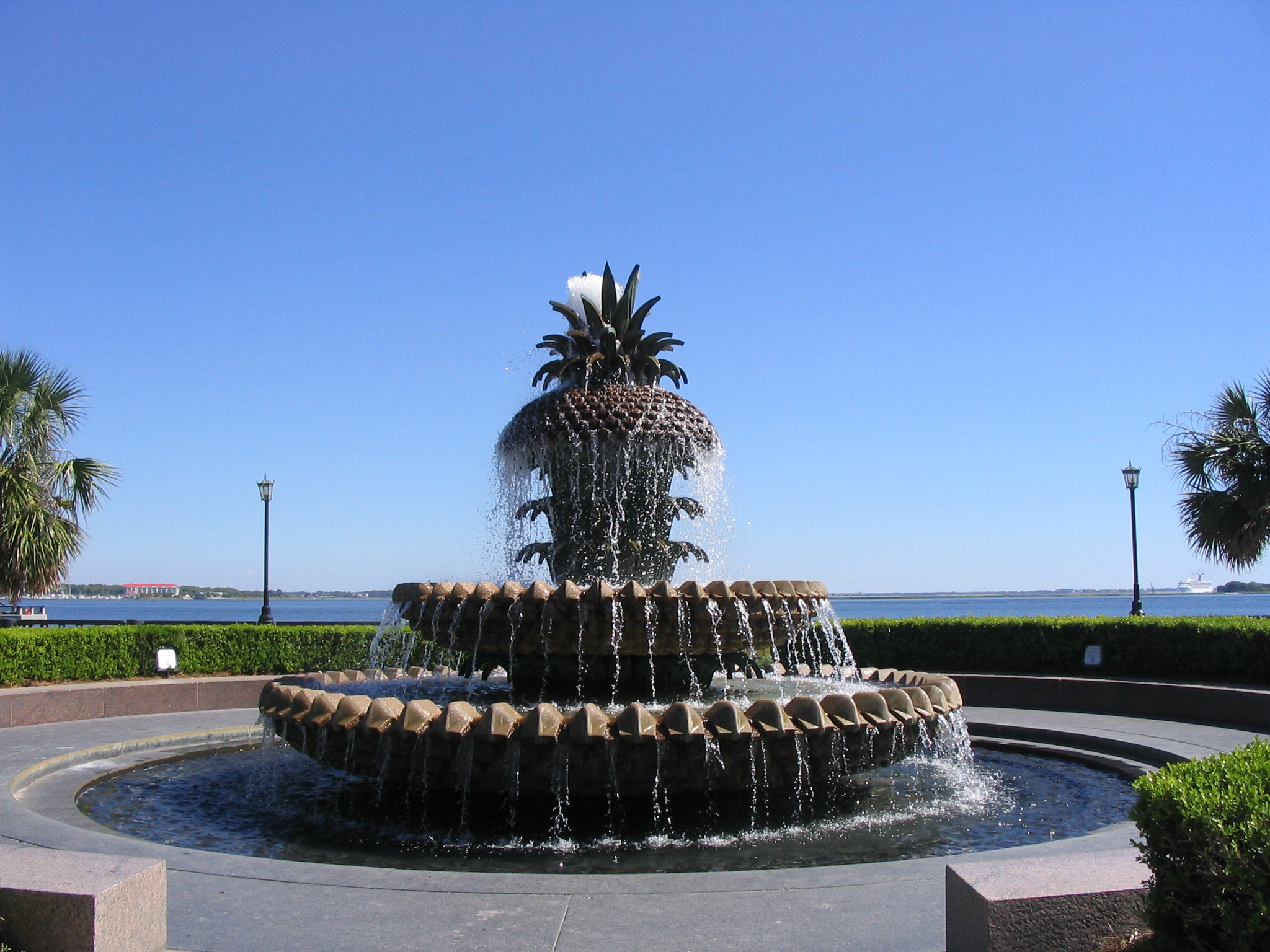
- Interactive map of Waterfront Park
- Location: Charleston, South Carolina
- Coordinates: 32°46′41″N 79°55′31″W
- Area: 12 acres (4.9 ha)
- Created: 1990

Waterfront Park is an eight-acre (5 ha) park along approximately one-half mile of the Cooper River in Charleston, South Carolina. The park received the 2007 Landmark Award from the American Society of Landscape Architects and the National Trust for Historic Preservation. This award "recognizes a distinguished landscape architecture project completed between 15 and 50 years ago that retains its original design integrity and contributes significantly to the public realm of the community in which it is located."

== History ==
The location of the park, between Vendue Range to the north and Adger's Wharf to the south, had historically been a center of maritime traffic with several wharves and shipping terminals. The area entered a long period of decline, capped in June 1955 by a fire at a steamship terminal at the site. By 1980, the site was an "overgrown area marred by charred pilings and gravel parking lots."

Mayor Joseph P. Riley Jr. began making plans for a park on the site soon after taking office in 1975. Acquisition of land began in 1979, and after more than a decade of planning, fund-raising and clearing environmental hurdles, the parks department and Ruscon Construction Co. broke ground in 1988. Work on the $13 million park progressed into 1989, and a target opening date was set for May 4, 1990. In September 1989, Hurricane Hugo struck, causing about $1 million of damage to the park. Nevertheless, the park opened on May 11, just one week past the pre-hurricane projection.

== Design ==
The park was designed by Stuart O. Dawson of Sasaki Associates with assistance from Edward Pinckney Associates and has received many design awards. The park is composed of distinct sections. At the northern entrance to the park at the foot of Vendue Range (a street in Charleston), a large fountain was built which anchors the end of the park. From the fountain, Vendue Wharf is a wide, wooden pier which extends into the Cooper River and offers sheltered swings. A floating dock is attached at the far end and provides unobstructed views of the Ravenel Bridge, Charleston Harbor, Castle Pinckney, the USS Yorktown (CV-10) at Patriot's Point, and Fort Sumter. The pier extends into the river approximately the same length as the Tidewater Terminals, Inc. facility had, and its charred pilings from the 1955 fire are still visible.

The largest portion of the park, between Vendue Range to the north and Exchange St. to the south, is itself made of two distinct sections. Running along Concord St. and Prioleau St. for approximately one-quarter mile is a dense canopy of oak trees and many benches. Parallel the shady urban park and immediately adjacent to the riverfront is an open lawn landscaped with palmetto trees. The 1,200 foot palmetto lined esplanade follows the natural water line ensuring public access to the water's edge. In the middle of the grassy lawn is the Pineapple Fountain, a large fountain shaped like a pineapple located immediately in front of the City Gallery.

At the southern end of the park, the formal esplanade follows the curve of the shore and turns back toward Concord Street. At Exchange Street, the park merges into restored salt marshes, creating valuable maritime habitat. Pedestrians can walk to the edge of the river at this point from Exchange Street to North Adger's Wharf. At the riverfront end of North Adger's Wharf, the 17th century pier was rebuilt in the original footprint with the original granite which was fished out of the river and reused. The pier was reconstructed using log cribbing construction of native palmetto trees to last for many generations. The pier marks the southern edge of the park.

== Gallery ==
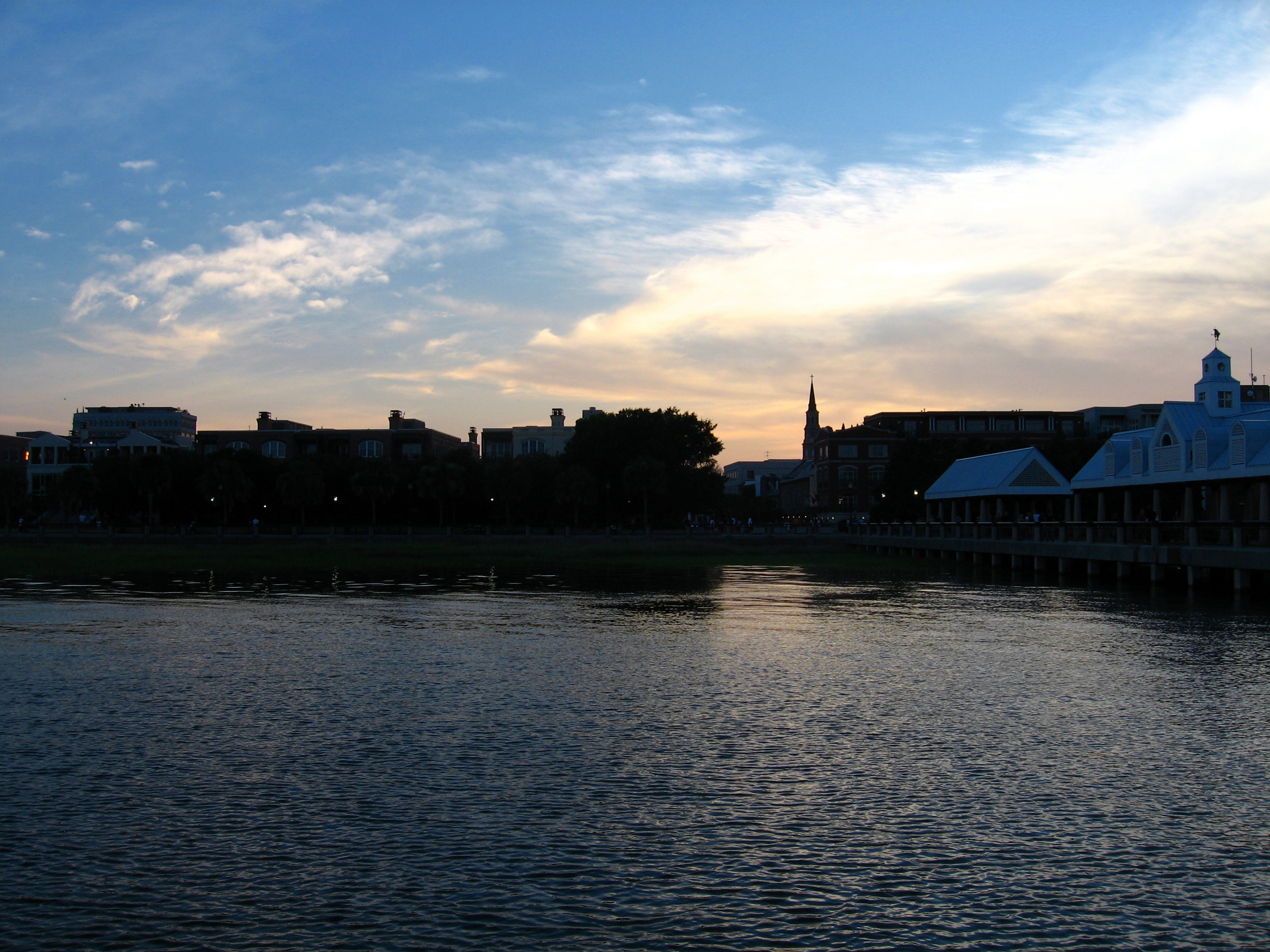
At sunset

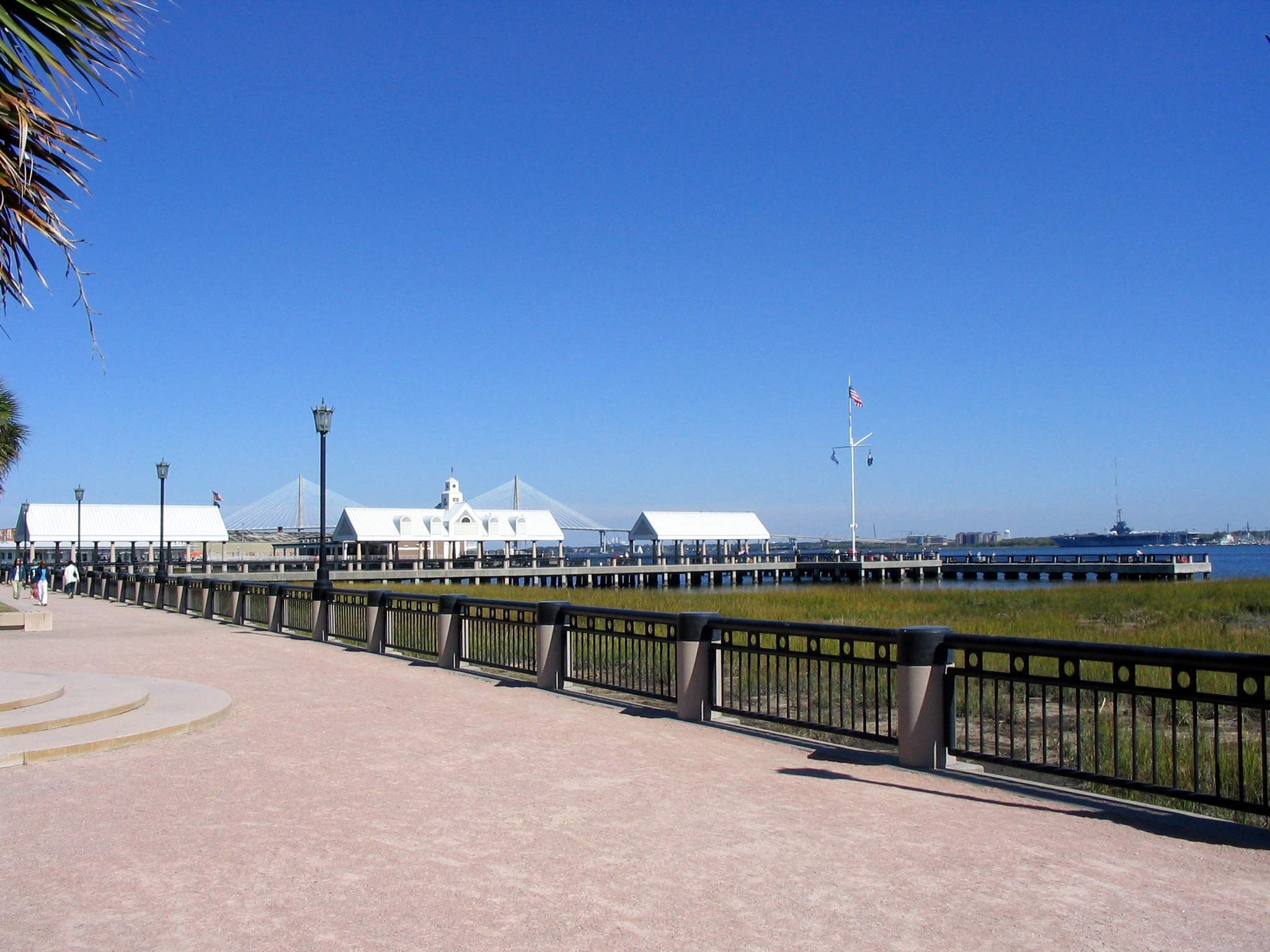
The pier and shelters

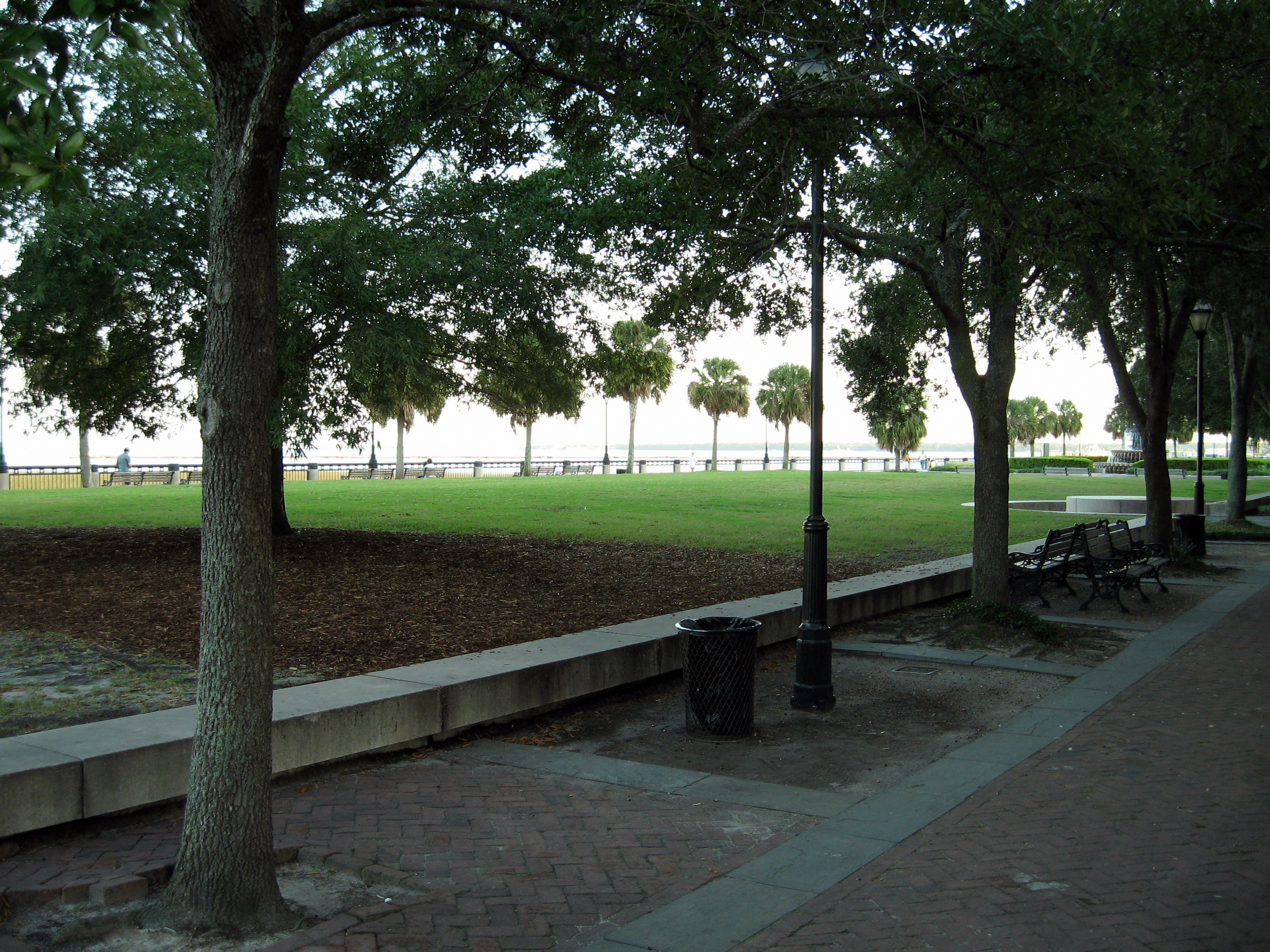
Looking south-southeast from the main fountain

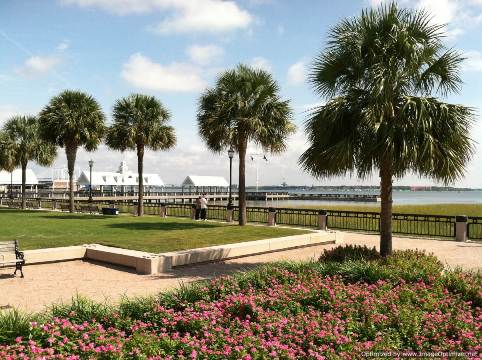
Looking toward the Cooper River

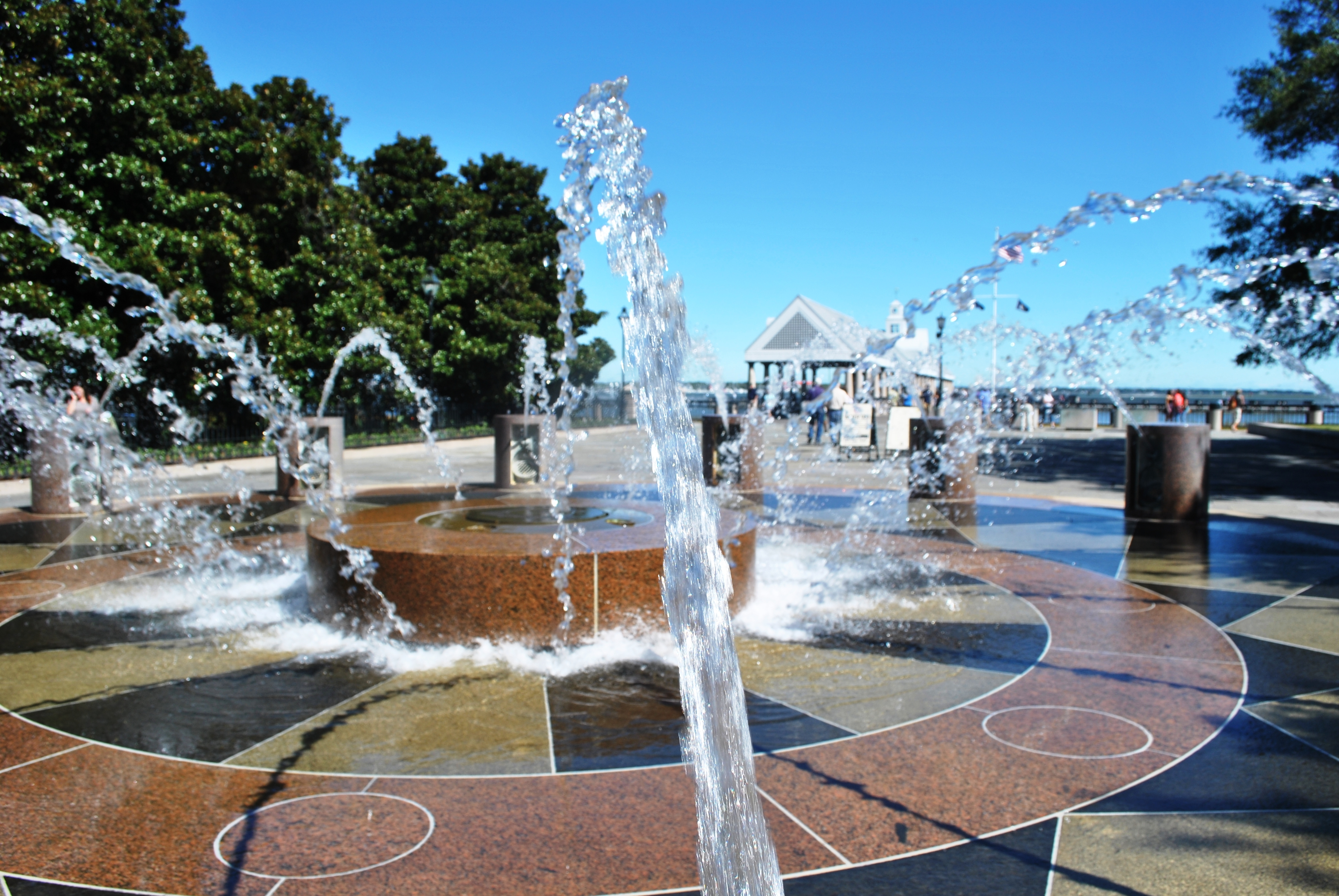
Fountain at the front entrance of the park

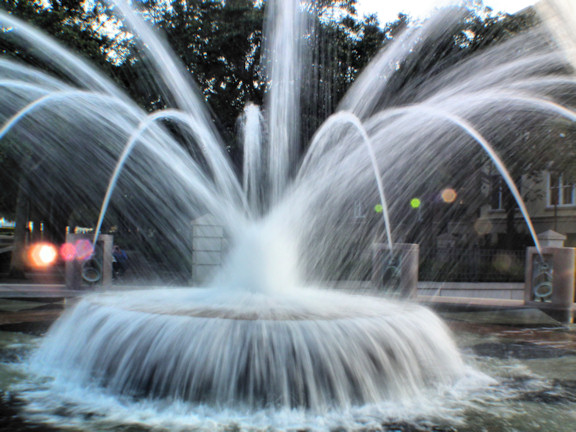
Close-up of the fountain
