= Vendue Range =

Street in Charleston, South Carolina

Coordinates: 32.7788°N 79.9263°W

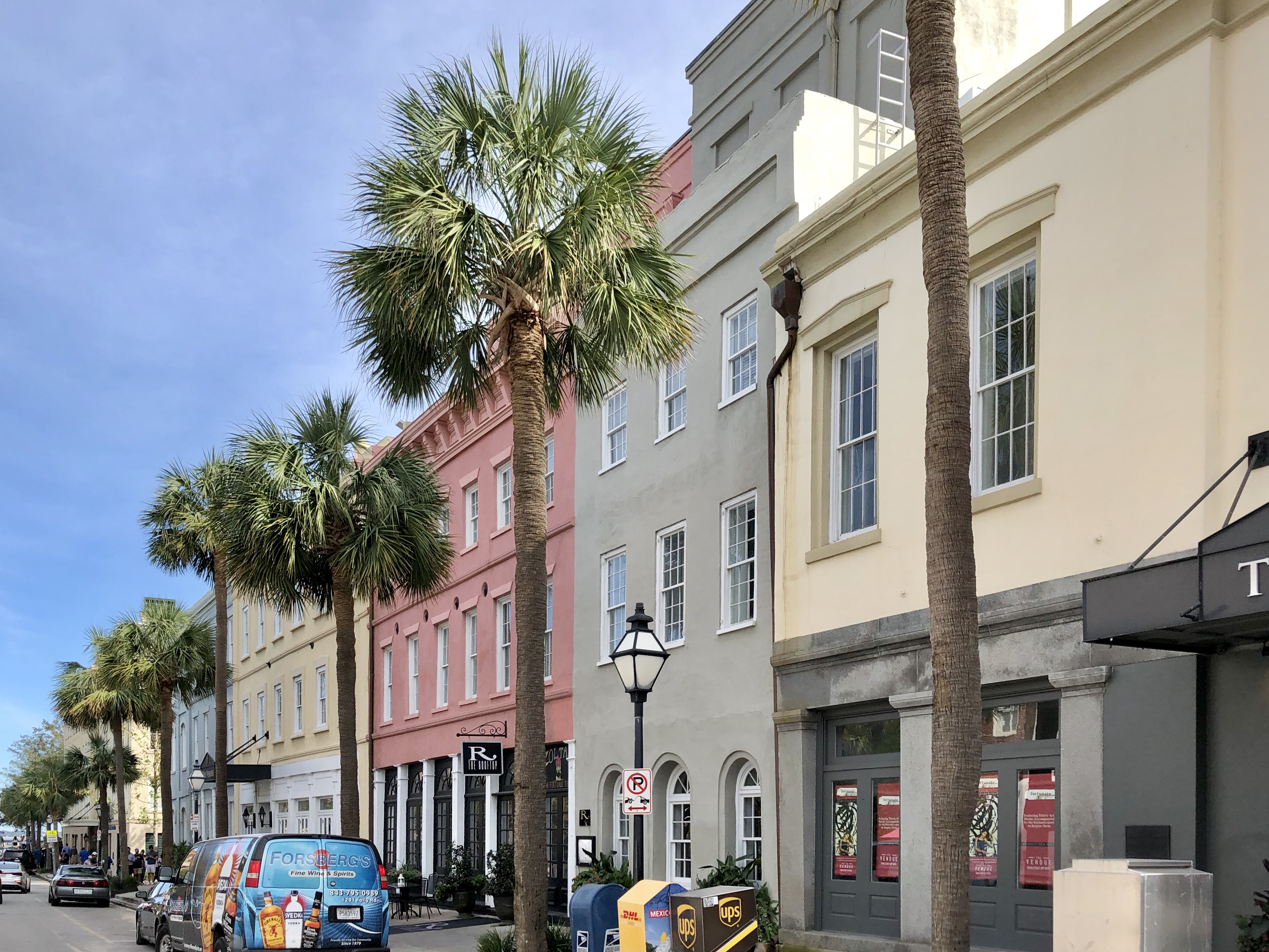
Vendue Range (2019)

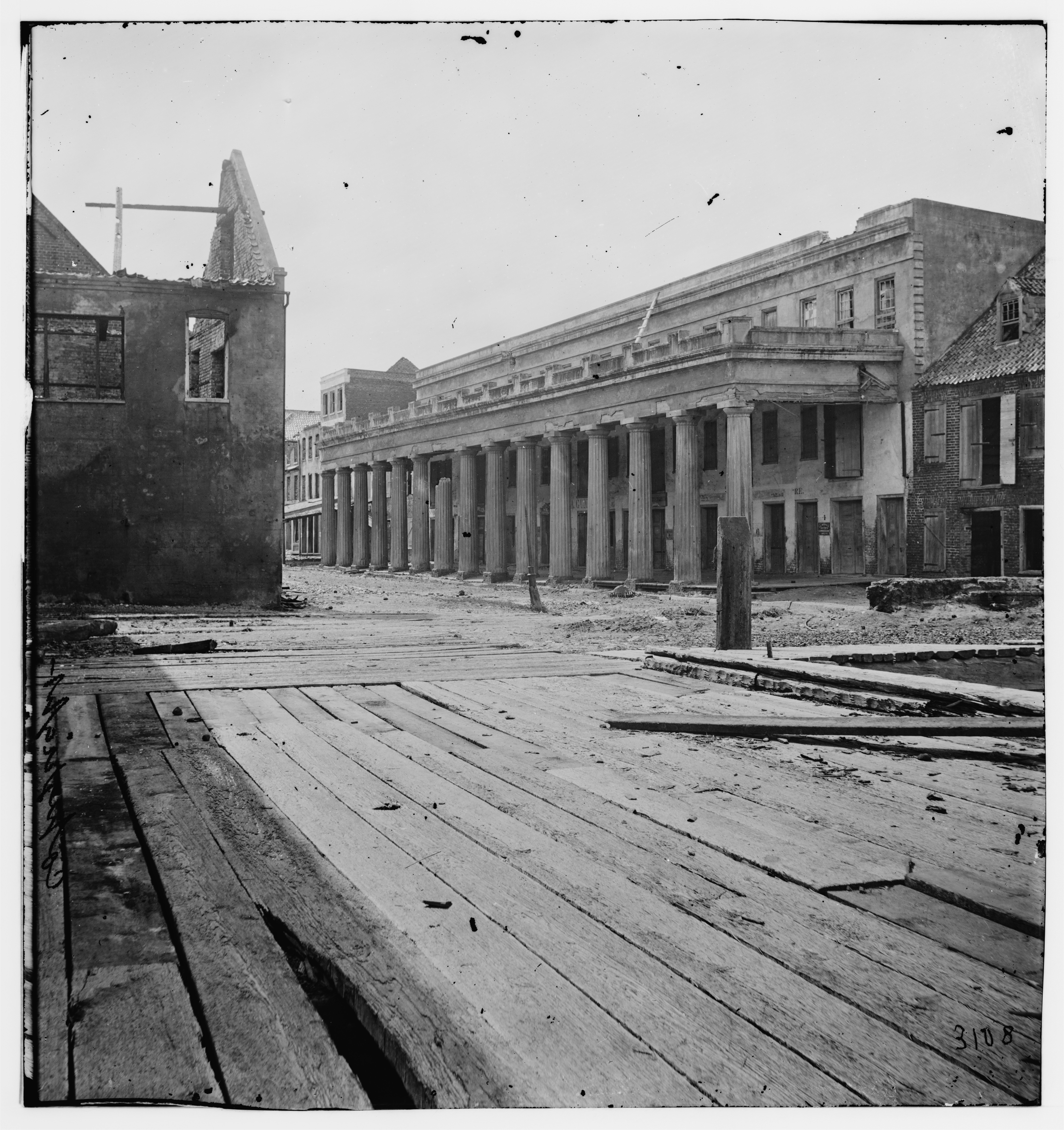
Vendue Range in 1865, after the fall of Confederate Charleston

The Vendue Range in Charleston, South Carolina, United States was a historic commercial street that hosted open-air sales of livestock, produce, and other goods. Vendue is a historic word of French origin that means auction or public sale. The street was among those bombarded by the U.S. Army during the last phase of the American Civil War. The street is now one of the boundaries of a successful downtown revitalization project known as Waterfront Park.
