= Cicero station (CTA Green Line) =

Chicago "L" station

Cicero 4800W 330N
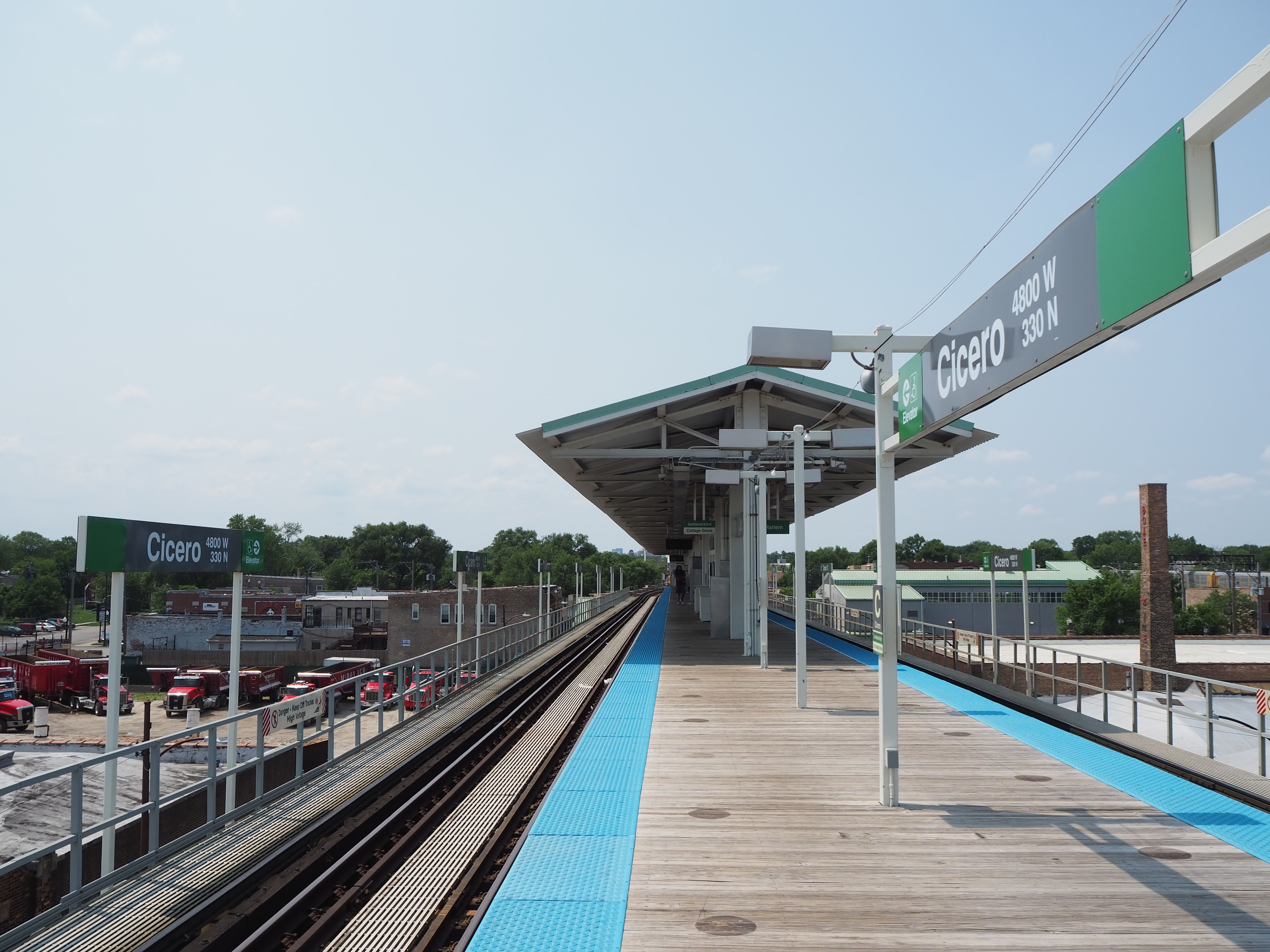

General information
- Location: 4800 West Lake Street; Chicago, Illinois 60644
- Coordinates: 41.886519°N 87.744698°W
- Owner: Chicago Transit Authority
- Line: Lake Branch
- Platforms: 1 island platform
- Tracks: 2 tracks

Construction
- Structure type: Elevated
- Cycle facilities: Yes
- Accessible: Yes

History
- Opened: March 3, 1894
- Rebuilt: 1996
- Former names: 48th Avenue

Passengers
- 2025: 242,139 ▲2.4%

Services
Preceding station	Chicago "L"	Following station
Laramie toward Harlem/Lake	Green Line	Pulaski toward Ashland/63rd or Cottage Grove
Former services
Preceding station	Chicago "L"	Following station
Laramie toward Harlem/Lake	Lake Street Elevated	Kostner Closed 1948 toward Loop (Randolph/Wells) or Market Terminal
Track layout
Location

Cicero is a station on the Chicago Transit Authority's 'L' system Green Line, serving the Austin neighborhood on Chicago's West Side. Originally opened on March 3, 1894, its design was made to be simpler than the other Lake Street Elevated stations constructed in the Queen Anne style, such as that of Ashland and Homan (now Conservatory–Central Park Drive), as well as featuring an island platform instead of the 2 side platforms that other Lake Street stations used. Until 1948, the next station eastbound was Kostner, which was designed in a similar style to Cicero, lacking both the ornate station houses and with a single island platform instead of twin platforms.

== Bus connections ==
CTA

- 54 Cicero

Pace

- 392 Green Line Cicero CTA/UPS Hodgkins (weekday UPS shifts only)
