= Central station (CTA Green Line) =

Chicago "L" station

Central 5600W 400N
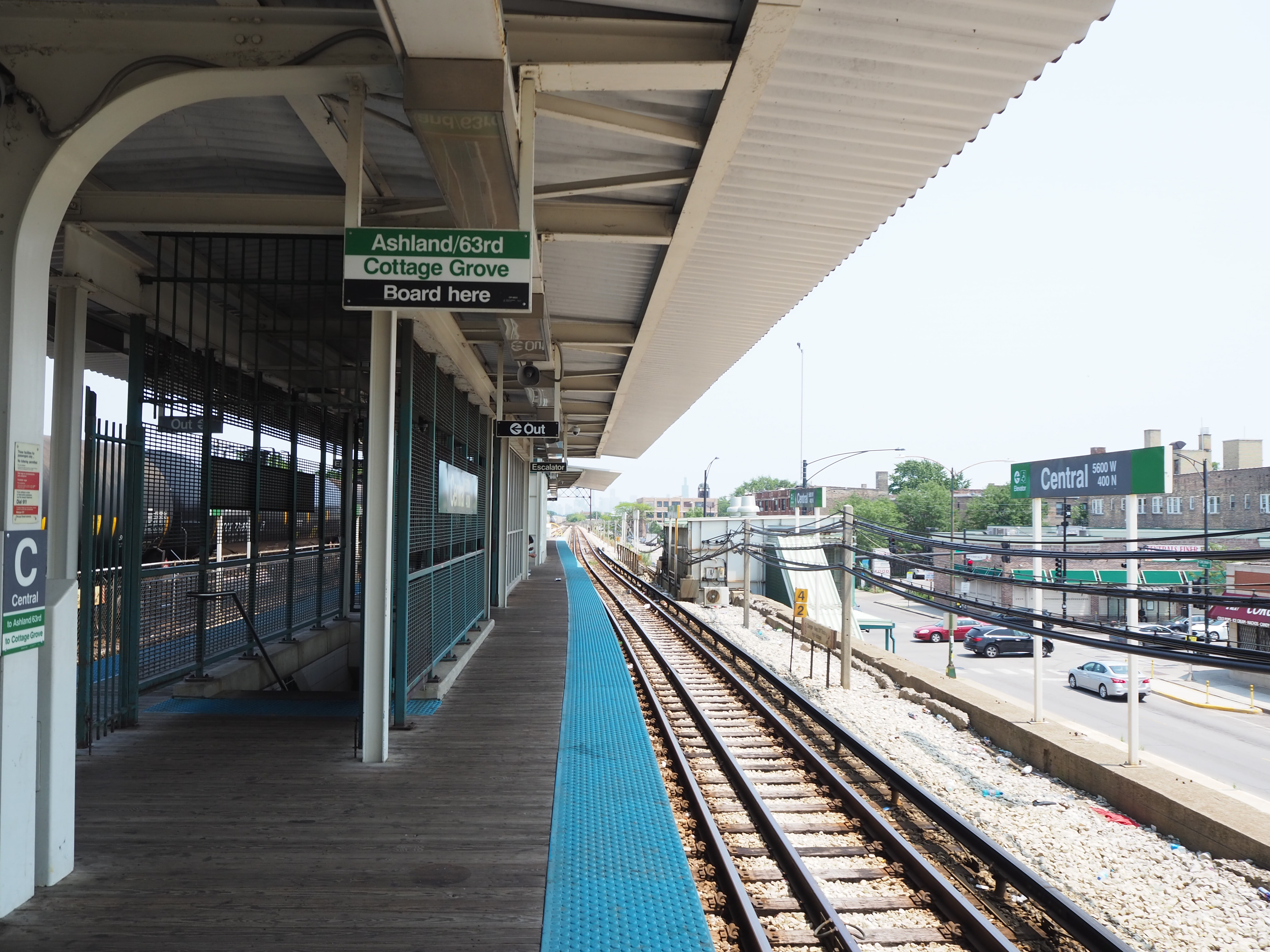

General information
- Location: 350 North Central Avenue; Chicago, Illinois 60644
- Coordinates: 41.887389°N 87.76565°W
- Owner: Chicago Transit Authority
- Line: Lake Branch
- Platforms: 1 island platform
- Tracks: 2 tracks

Construction
- Structure type: Embankment
- Cycle facilities: Yes
- Accessible: Yes

History
- Opened: April 15, 1899
- Rebuilt: 1962, 1994–96 (renovation)

Passengers
- 2025: 390,225 ▼2%

Services
Preceding station	Chicago "L"	Following station
Austin toward Harlem/Lake	Green Line	Laramie toward Ashland/63rd or Cottage Grove
Former services
Preceding station	Chicago and North Western Railway	Following station
Austin Boulevard toward Geneva	Galena Division	Kedzie toward Chicago
Austin Boulevard toward Geneva	Galena Division	Linden Park toward Wells Street
Preceding station	Chicago "L"	Following station
Menard Closed 1948 toward Harlem/Lake	Lake Street Elevated	Laramie toward Loop (Randolph/Wells) or Market Terminal
Track layout
Location

Central is a station on the Chicago Transit Authority's 'L' system and is located at 350 North Central Avenue in the Austin neighborhood on Chicago's West side.

== History ==
The original Central station was built as part of an extension of the Lake Street Elevated Railroad that opened on April 15, 1899. The structure, consisting of a single island platform, was originally at grade, but was relocated onto an embankment in 1962 to allow Central Avenue to pass underneath. The Parkside Avenue auxiliary entrance closed on January 15, 1973. During the 1994–1996 Green Line rehabilitation, Central was repainted and an elevator was added for accessibility.

Despite the identical name, it is geographically distant from Central station on the Purple Line.

== Location ==
The station address is 350 North Central Avenue and it is situated between the Laramie and Austin stations on the Green Line, which runs from Harlem/Lake and to Ashland/63rd and Cottage Grove. The station is located at the intersection of Central Avenue and Corcoran Place in the Austin neighborhood on Chicago's West Side.

== Bus connections ==
CTA

- 85 Central
