= Austin station (CTA Green Line) =

Chicago "L" station

Austin 6000W 400N
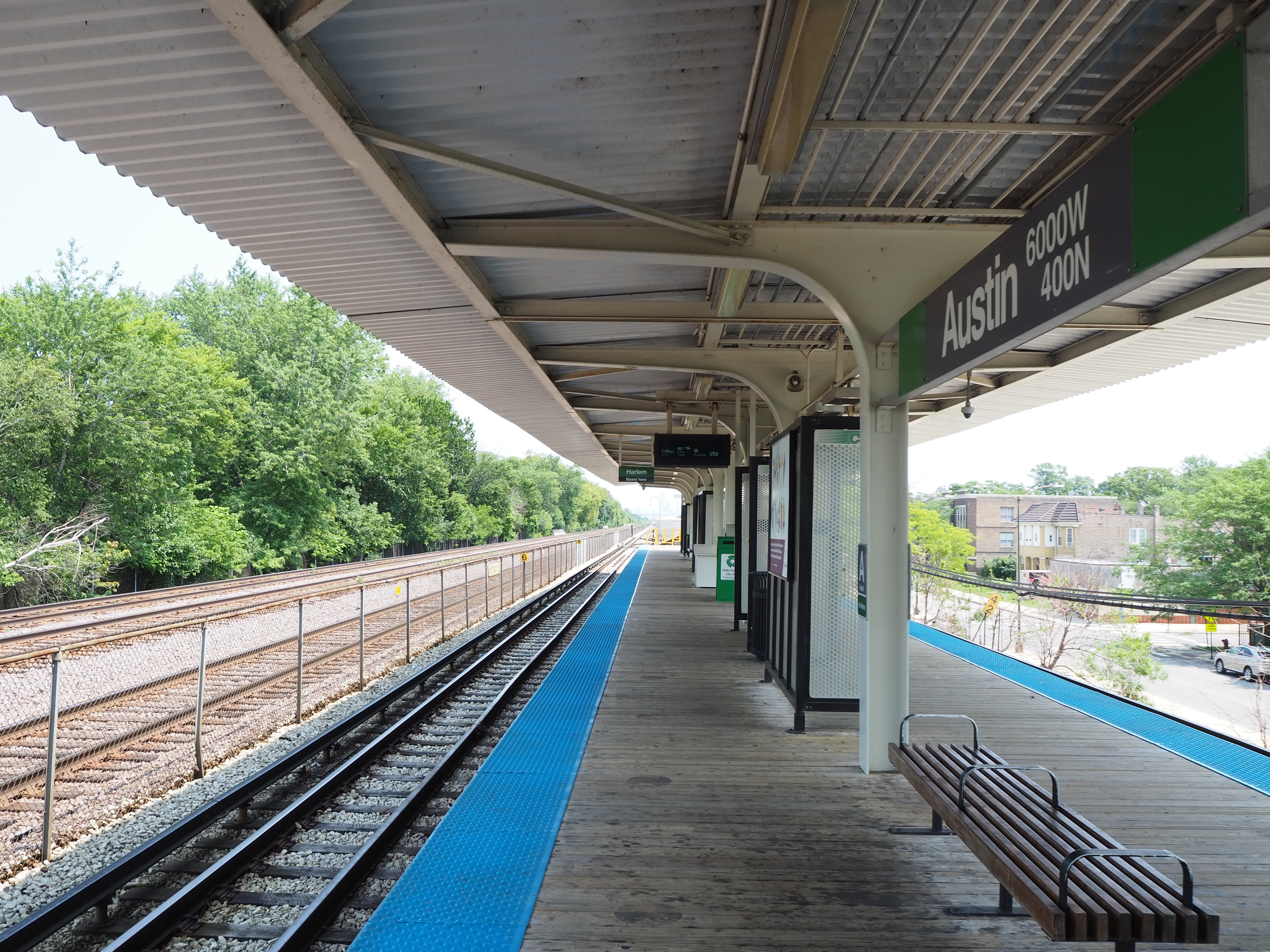

General information
- Location: 351 North Austin Boulevard; Chicago, Illinois 60644
- Coordinates: 41.887293°N 87.774135°W
- Owner: Chicago Transit Authority
- Line: Lake Branch
- Platforms: 1 island platform
- Tracks: 2 tracks
- Connections: CTA and Pace buses

Construction
- Structure type: Embankment
- Accessible: Yes

History
- Opened: April 15, 1899
- Rebuilt: 1962, 2025–26

Passengers
- 2025: 304,584 ▲1.2%

Services
Preceding station	Chicago "L"	Following station
Ridgeland toward Harlem/Lake	Green Line	Central toward Ashland/63rd or Cottage Grove
Former services
Preceding station	Chicago and North Western Railway	Following station
Ridgeland toward Geneva	Galena Division	Austin toward Chicago
Preceding station	Chicago "L"	Following station
Lombard Closed 1948 toward Forest Park	Lake Street Elevated	Menard Closed 1948 toward Loop (Randolph/Wells) or Market Terminal
Track layout
Location

Austin is a station on the Chicago Transit Authority's 'L' system. It is located between the Ridgeland and Central stations on the Green Line, which runs from Harlem/Lake and to Ashland/63rd and Cottage Grove. The station is located at the intersection of Austin Boulevard and Corcoran Place in the Austin neighborhood on Chicago's West Side and borders the village of Oak Park.

Austin opened on April 15, 1899, as part of a surface level extension of the Lake Street Elevated Railroad, along with Central. It was rebuilt in the early 1960s as part of a project which moved the western end of the Lake Street line off of its street level alignment and onto an abandoned strip of the parallel Chicago and Northwestern Railway's embankment. The station at Austin consists of a single island platform; a stairway and escalator connect the platform to a station building. Trains serve Austin from 3:50 a.m. to 1:00 a.m. on weekdays, from 4:55 a.m. to 1:00 a.m. on Saturdays, from 4:55 a.m. to 1:00 a.m. on Sundays. In addition to trains, Austin also serves CTA and Pace buses.

== History ==
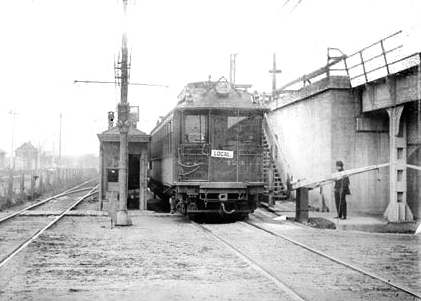
The original Austin station in 1909

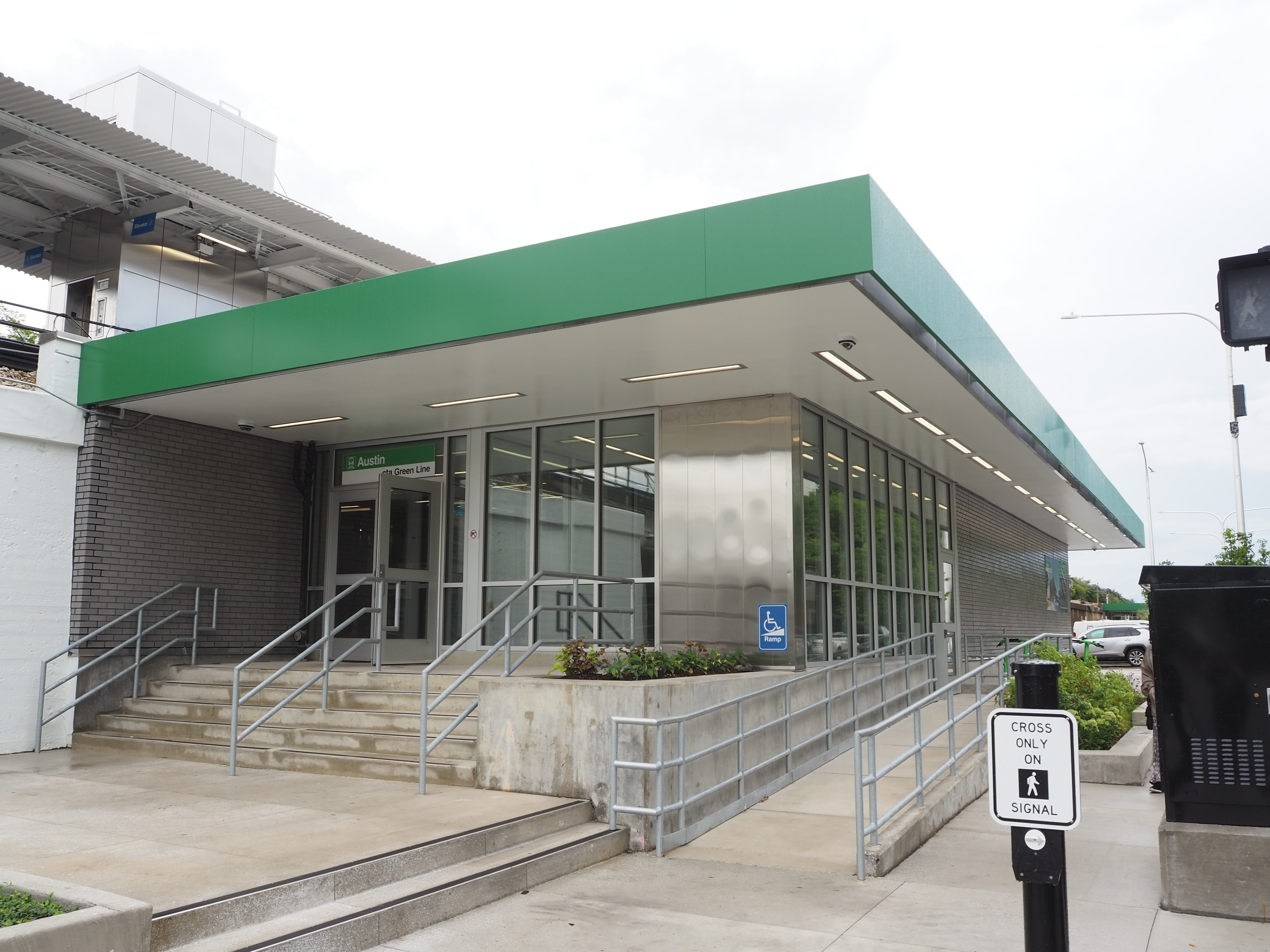
The rebuilt station entrance after the 2024-2026 renovation

The first Austin station opened in 1899, as part of a grade-level extension of the Lake Street Elevated Railroad west from terminal at 52nd Avenue through Austin and Oak Park. It temporarily served as the terminal for the Lake Street Elevated until the line was extended further west later that year.

It was rebuilt in 1962, as part of a project which moved the western two and a half miles of the Lake Street line off of its street level alignment and onto an abandoned strip of the parallel Chicago and North Western Railway's embankment. As part of the reconstruction, an auxiliary entrance was constructed at Mason Avenue, a block east of the main entrance. On February 18, 1973, the Mason entrance was reduced to functioning only as an auxiliary exit due to budget cuts. It was later closed entirely in 1994. By December 2024, work was underway to reactivate the Mason Avenue auxiliary entrance/exit. In July 2025, the Mason Avenue auxiliary entrance/exit reopened and the Main Entrance closed. The reconstruction project began and was complete by August 7, 2026.

== Facilities ==
The station consists of a single island platform on a grade-separated embankment. The platform is located on the south side of the right of way of Metra's Union Pacific West Line to the east of Austin Boulevard. It serves the Green Line's two tracks; the northern track serves trains to Harlem/Lake, while the southern track serves trains to Ashland/63rd and Cottage Grove. Fare controls and a customer assistant booth are in the station house, alongside the railroad embankment at street level. Access to the platform is provided by a stairwell, an escalator, and an elevator, making the station accessible to passengers with disabilities.

== Service ==
Austin is part of the Chicago Transit Authority's Green Line, which runs from Harlem/Lake to downtown Chicago and south to Ashland/63rd and Cottage Grove on Chicago's South Side. It is the fourth inbound station from Harlem/Lake on the Green Line and is located between the Ridgeland and Central stations. Green Line trains serve Austin from 3:50 a.m. to 1:00 a.m. on weekdays, from 4:55 a.m. to 1:00 a.m. on Saturdays, from 4:55 a.m. to 1:00 a.m. on Sundays. The station is approximately 4 minutes from Harlem/Lake, 17 minutes from Clark/Lake in the Loop, 51 minutes from Ashland/63rd, and 45 minutes from Cottage Grove. 629,581 passengers boarded at Austin in 2011.

== Bus connections ==
CTA

- 91 Austin

Pace

- 309 Lake Street
- 313 St. Charles Road
- 315 Austin Boulevard - Midway

In addition to 'L' trains, the station provides service to several bus routes. One CTA bus route stop at Austin, 91 Austin. This route provides service to Austin Avenue, the Austin Blue Line station, Lawrence Avenue, and the Jefferson Park Transit Center. Service to Taft High School is also provided on school days. Additionally, Pace operates three bus routes to the station: the 309 Lake Street, 313 St. Charles Road, and 315 Austin Boulevard - Midway. These routes provide service to West Suburban Hospital, Westlake Community Hospital, the Elmhurst Metra station, the Melrose Park Metra station, Yorktown Center, East Gate Shopping Center, and the municipalities of Oak Park, River Forest, Maywood, Melrose Park, Northlake, Stone Park, Elmhurst, Bellwood, Berkeley, Villa Park, and Lombard.
