= Pulaski station (CTA Green Line) =

Chicago "L" station

Pulaski 4000W 300N
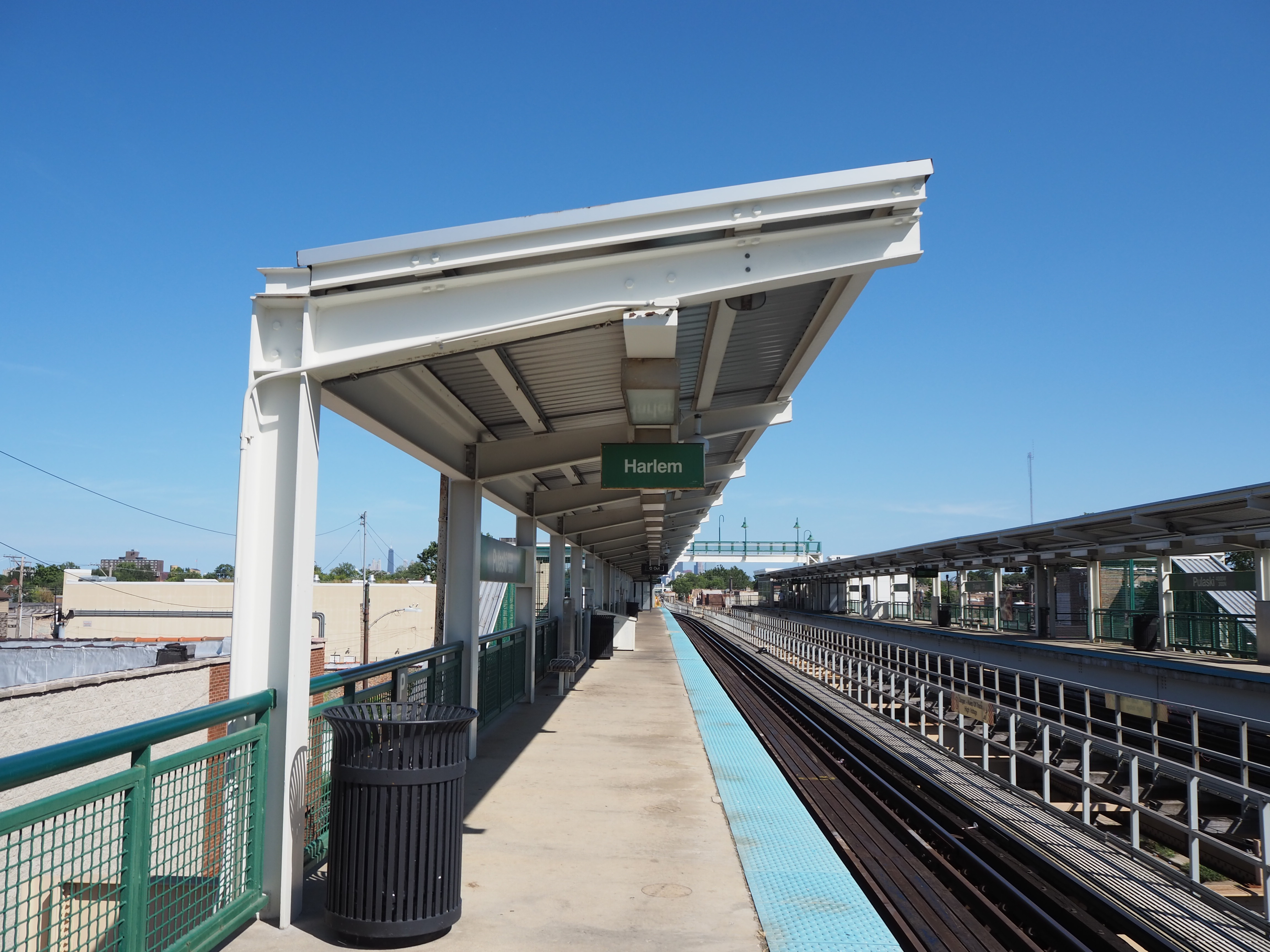

General information
- Location: 4000 West Lake Street; Chicago, Illinois 60624
- Coordinates: 41.885412°N 87.725404°W
- Owner: Chicago Transit Authority
- Line: Lake Branch
- Platforms: 2 side platforms
- Tracks: 2 tracks

Construction
- Structure type: Elevated
- Cycle facilities: Yes
- Accessible: Yes

History
- Opened: March 1894
- Rebuilt: 1973 (canopies, fare controls); 1996 (platforms); 2001 (station houses, elevators added)
- Former names: 40th Avenue; Crawford Avenue

Passengers
- 2025: 292,367 ▲3%

Services
Preceding station	Chicago "L"	Following station
Cicero toward Harlem/Lake	Green Line	Conservatory toward Ashland/63rd or Cottage Grove
Former services
Preceding station	Chicago "L"	Following station
Kostner Closed 1948 toward Forest Park	Lake Street Elevated	Hamlin Closed 1956 toward Loop (Randolph/Wells) or Market Terminal
Track layout
Location

Pulaski is a station on the Chicago Transit Authority's 'L' system, serving the Green Line. Pulaski is located at the intersection of Lake Street and Pulaski Road in the West Garfield Park neighborhood of Chicago, Illinois. The station opened in March 1894.

== History ==
Pulaski was constructed in 1892-94 and opened in March 1894 as part of the Lake Street Elevated Railroad. The station was constructed in the Queen Anne architectural style, as were the other Lake Street stations. In 1956, Pulaski's platforms were lengthened by 200 feet from the east end and additional entrances to the station were opened at Harding Avenue after the closing of the nearby Hamlin station. The Harding Avenue entrance to the eastbound platform became exit-only in 1960, but the westbound entrance remained open. Pulaski was rebuilt in 1973, and the original station houses were demolished at this time. On December 18, 1993, the westbound Harding Avenue exit closed. In 1994, Pulaski closed along with the rest of the Green Line so it could be rebuilt. The platforms at the station were completely rebuilt during its closure, but the original fare controls were kept, so the old platforms were converted into walkways between the fare controls and the platform. A wooden railing was erected on the old platforms to keep passengers away from the tracks. This arrangement was designed to be temporary in the hopes that Pulaski could be turned into a "super-station", but by 1999 the CTA gave up on the super-station plan and built a new station house which connected to the new platforms. The old platforms and fare controls were removed in 2011.

== Services ==
As part of the Green Line, Pulaski is used by those traveling between the West Garfield Park neighborhood and other areas served by the line, including Oak Park and Forest Park, the Loop, and the South Side. Trains to Harlem/Lake arrive approximately every ten minutes; trains toward Ashland/63rd and Cottage Grove arrive every ten minutes as well, and alternating trains go to each terminus.

Pulaski has separate station houses and fare controls for the inbound and outbound platforms. Farecard vending machines are present at both entrances. A customer assistant booth is located at the inbound entrance; passengers at the outbound entrance must press a call button if they need assistance. The station's elevated platforms are accessible via stairs and elevators; both platforms are wheelchair accessible. An overhead footbridge connects the two platforms, but it may only be used by CTA employees. Pulaski is connected to the Bethel New Life community center next to the station via a bridge from the outbound station house.

== Bus connections ==
CTA

- 53 Pulaski (Owl Service)
