= Lake Street Elevated =

Segment of the Chicago "L"

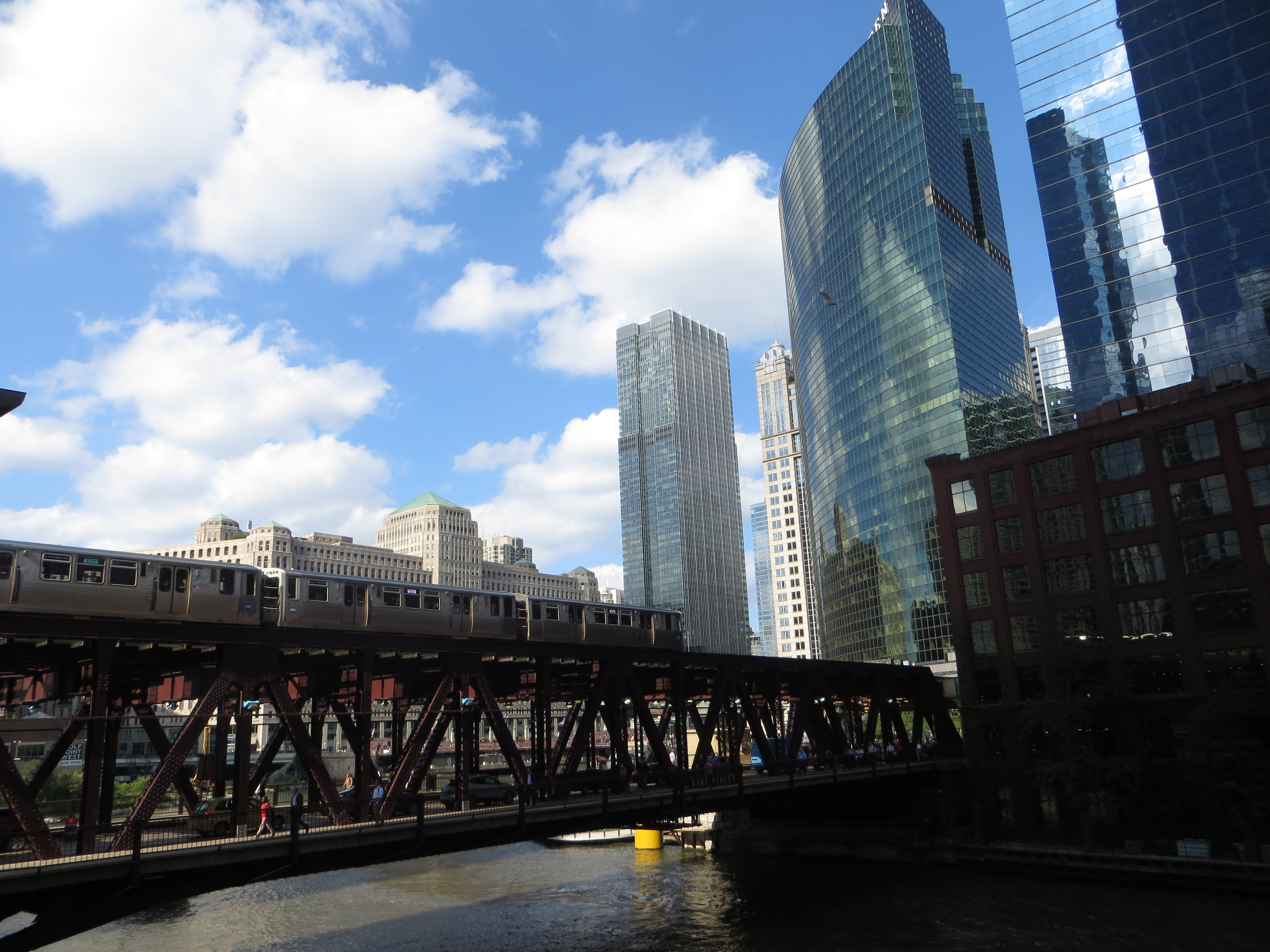
- Green Line train crossing the Chicago River

Overview
- Status: Operational
- Locale: Chicago, Illinois, United States; Oak Park, Illinois; Forest Park, Illinois
- Termini: Harlem/Lake; Clinton
- Stations: 15

Service
- Type: Rapid transit
- System: Chicago "L"
- Services: Green Pink
- Operator(s): Chicago Transit Authority (1947–present); Chicago Rapid Transit Company (1924–1947); Chicago and Oak Park Elevated Railroad (1904–1924); Lake Street Elevated Railroad Company (1893–1904)
- Rolling stock: 5000-series
- Daily ridership: 27,701 (average weekday 2019)

History
- Opened: November 6, 1893; 133 years ago (Current operation)

Technical
- Line length: 8.75 mi (14.08 km)
- Character: Elevated
- Track gauge: 4 ft 8 1/2 in (1,435 mm) standard gauge
- Electrification: Third rail, 600 V DC

The Lake Street Elevated, also known as the Lake branch, is a 8.75 mi (14.08 km) long branch of the Chicago "L" which is located west of the Chicago Loop and serves the Green Line for its entire length, as well as the Pink Line east of Ashland Avenue. As of February 2013, the branch serves an average of 27,217 passengers each weekday. It serves the Near West Side, East Garfield Park, West Garfield Park, and Austin neighborhoods of Chicago, as well as the suburbs Oak Park and Forest Park. It owes its name to Lake Street, the street that the branch overlooks for 6.25 mi (10.06 km) before continuing its route straight west, adjacent to South Boulevard, towards the terminus at Harlem/Lake.

== History ==
Chicago "L" train transitioning from street level to elevated tracks along the Lake Street branch; this was taken a few months before the at-grade section became elevated

The Lake Street Elevated began regular passenger service on November 6, 1893, from its eastern terminal at Madison Street and Market Street to California Avenue. On November 24, 1893, service on the line was extended to Homan Avenue. In March 1894, service on the line was extended to 48th Avenue (now known as Cicero Avenue) and on April 29, 1894, service was extended to 52nd Avenue (now known as Laramie Avenue), which at the time was the city limits of Chicago. When the completed Loop opened October 3, 1897, the Lake Street Elevated became the first line to utilize the entire quadrangle. In 1898, an agreement was reached with Cicero Township to extend the Lake Street Elevated beyond the Chicago city limits into what at the time was Cicero Township. This agreement allowed for the extension of the Lake Street Elevated along South Boulevard, as well as the creation of the Randolph Street Branch and Cuyler Avenue Shuttle. The Randolph and Cuyler branches were part of trackage rights given by the Chicago, Harlem & Batavia Railway, its trains continued east to Grand Central Station. On January 25, 1901, service was extended to Wisconsin Avenue (later called Marion), and C&GW service was abandoned. On May 20, 1910, service was extended to its terminal approximately two blocks west of Harlem Avenue in Forest Park.

In April 1948, the Lake Street Elevated was the first line of the 'L' system to use the Skip-Stop A/B service. Upon the implementation of Skip-Stop A/B service ten stations on the Lake Street Elevated were closed, as was the Market Street Stub, and all trains were routed through the Loop. This new system decreased the travel time of 24–35 minutes, which was considered by the CTA and its users to be a great success.

On October 28, 1962, 2.5 mi (4.0 km) of ground level tracks in Chicago's Austin neighborhood and Oak Park, Illinois were replaced by elevated tracks which run on Chicago & North Western Railroad's track embankment. New stations were built at Central, Austin, Ridgeland and Oak Park. and a new terminus opened at Harlem, replacing the station at Marion and the Forest Park terminus.

=== Market Street stub ===
Prior to the opening of the Loop elevated in 1897, the Lake Street Elevated's eastern terminus was the Market Street Terminal at Madison Street and Market Street. After the opening of the Loop in 1897, service continued to the Market Street stub, which had a stop at Randolph & Market in addition to the terminal at Madison & Market. Service to the Market Street stub ended on April 4, 1948, as the CTA implemented its new A/B skip-stop service. The Market Street stub was demolished soon after to make way for construction of Wacker Drive.

=== New infill stations ===
Construction of the new Morgan station began in Summer 2010. TranSystems led the design team, in conjunction with Ross Barney Architects. Like most currently active Green Line and Pink Line stations, Morgan is ADA-accessible, with an elevator on either side of the tracks. The station will also have bike storage.

The new Morgan station officially opened on May 18, 2012, and grand opening ceremonies were held on May 24.

The new $60 million Damen station filled a 1.5-mile (2.4 km) distance between the California and Ashland stations. A design for the new station was released on July 9, 2018, groundbreaking of the new station began in August 2022, and was completed and opened on August 5, 2024.

== Service history ==
Until 1969, the Lake Branch was an independent branch line providing service in one direction only, like the Ravenswood and Evanston Express Lines: from the Loop to the West Side, Oak Park, and Forest Park. On September 28, 1969, it was paired with the newly opened Dan Ryan branch to form the Lake–Dan Ryan Line, also called the West-South Route, via the north and east legs of the Loop, the South Side Elevated, and the connection along 18th Street. This operation lasted for 24 years. On February 21, 1993, as part of the opening of the Orange Line, the CTA began to differentiate the "L" lines by colors, and the present day Green Line routing was introduced, effectively swapping the full South Side Elevated with the Dan Ryan branch, which was instead paired with the North Side Main Line via the State Street subway, using a new connection.

On January 9, 1994, the Lake Street Elevated and the entire Green Line closed for two years for a rehabilitation project. When the line reopened on May 12, 1996, most stations were rebuilt and equipped with elevators in order to make them ADA compliant, and six stations were permanently closed.

Fast-motion video along the line

In April 1998, the Green Line, Purple Line, and the Douglas branch of the Blue Line, lost their 24/7 service.

In 2006, the CTA introduced the Pink Line routing, which runs trains from the Cermak branch to the Loop via the Paulina Connector and the Lake Street Elevated east of Paulina Street. This routing was previously used from 1954 to 1958 while the Forest Park branch was under construction to replace the Garfield Park branch. Once the Forest Park branch opened, the Paulina connector saw very little if any revenue service, but was kept as it was the only track connection (albeit largely reduced to one track) between what would later be known as the West-Northwest route (now the Blue line) and the rest of the system.

== Station listing ==
Station	Location	Notes
Forest Park	Marengo Avenue and Circle Avenue, Forest Park	Closed 1962; demolished; replaced by Harlem
Harlem/Lake	1 S. Harlem Avenue, Forest Park	
Marion	Marion Avenue and South Boulevard, Oak Park	Closed October 28, 1962; demolished; replaced by Harlem
Oak Park	100 S. Oak Park Avenue, Oak Park	
Ridgeland	100 N. Ridgeland Avenue, Oak Park	
Lombard	Lombard Avenue and South Boulevard, Oak Park	Closed 1948; demolished
Austin	351 N. Austin Boulevard	
Menard	Menard Avenue and Lake Street	Closed 1948; demolished
Central	350 N. Central Avenue	
Laramie	5148 W. Lake Street	
Cicero	4800 W. Lake Street	
Kostner	Kostner Avenue and Lake Street	Closed 1948; demolished
Pulaski	4000 W. Lake Street	
Hamlin	3800 W. Lake St.	Closed March 18, 1956; demolished
Conservatory–Central Park Drive	3630 W. Lake Street	
Homan	3400 W. Lake Street	Closed January 9, 1994; demolished; replaced by Conservatory-Central Park Drive; originally called Garfield Park
Kedzie	3200 W. Lake Street	
Sacramento	Sacramento Boulevard and Lake Street	Closed 1948; demolished
California	2800 W. Lake Street	
Campbell	Campbell Avenue and Lake Street	Closed 1948; demolished
Oakley	Oakley Boulevard and Lake Street	Closed 1948; demolished
Damen	Damen Avenue and Lake Street	
Wood	Wood Street and Lake Street	Closed 1913; demolished
Lake Street Transfer	Lake Street and Paulina Street	Closed February 25, 1951; demolished
Ashland	1601 W. Lake Street	
Loomis	Loomis Street and Lake Street	Closed April 4, 1954; demolished
Racine	Racine Street and Lake Street	Closed 1948; demolished
Morgan	958 W. Lake Street	
Halsted	800 W. Lake Street	Closed January 9, 1994; demolished
Clinton	540 W. Lake Street	
Canal	500 W. Lake Street	Closed 1909; demolished

== Image gallery ==
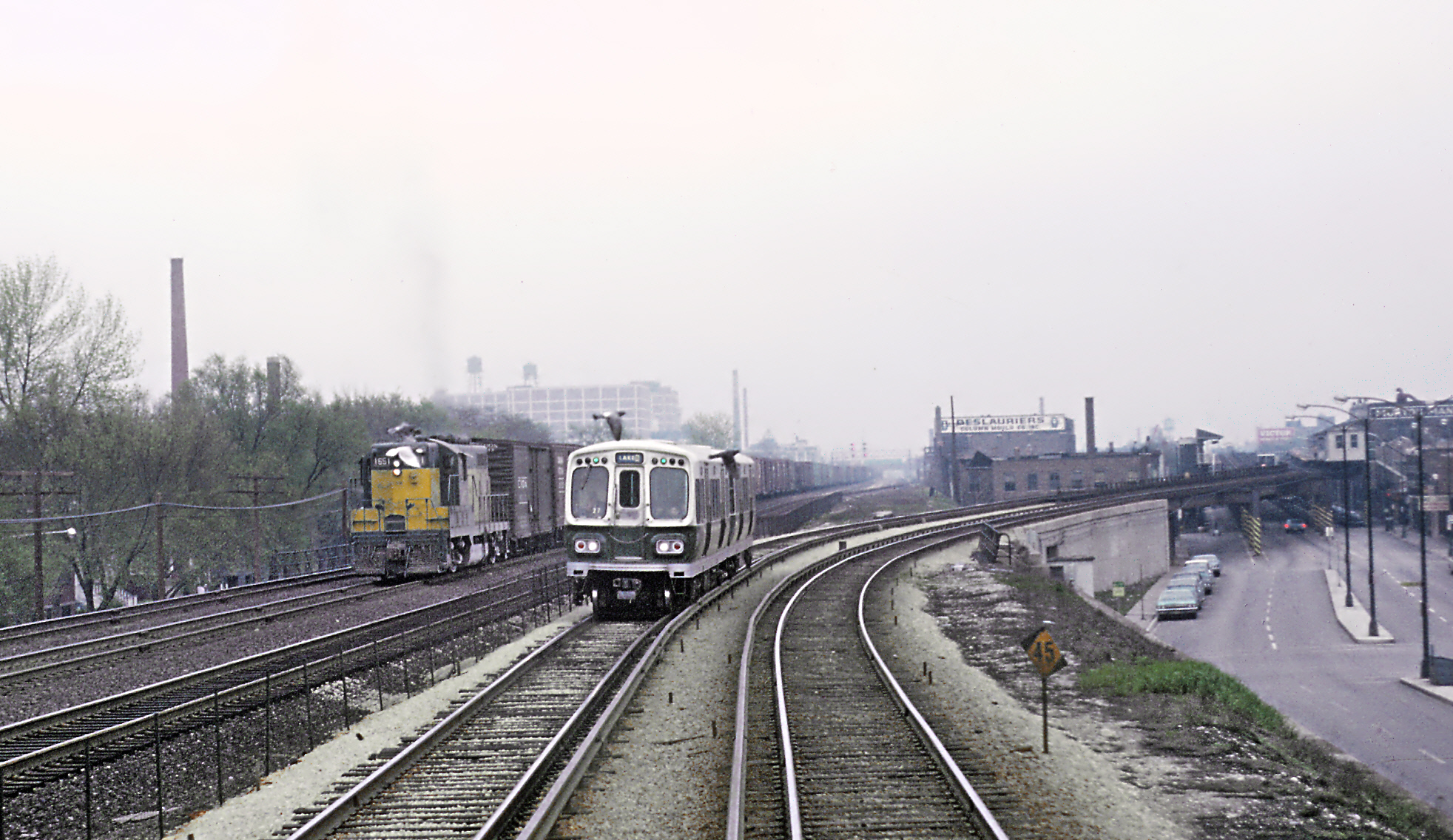
The transition from embankment to elevated over Lake Street in 1967. The C&NW freight train is at left.

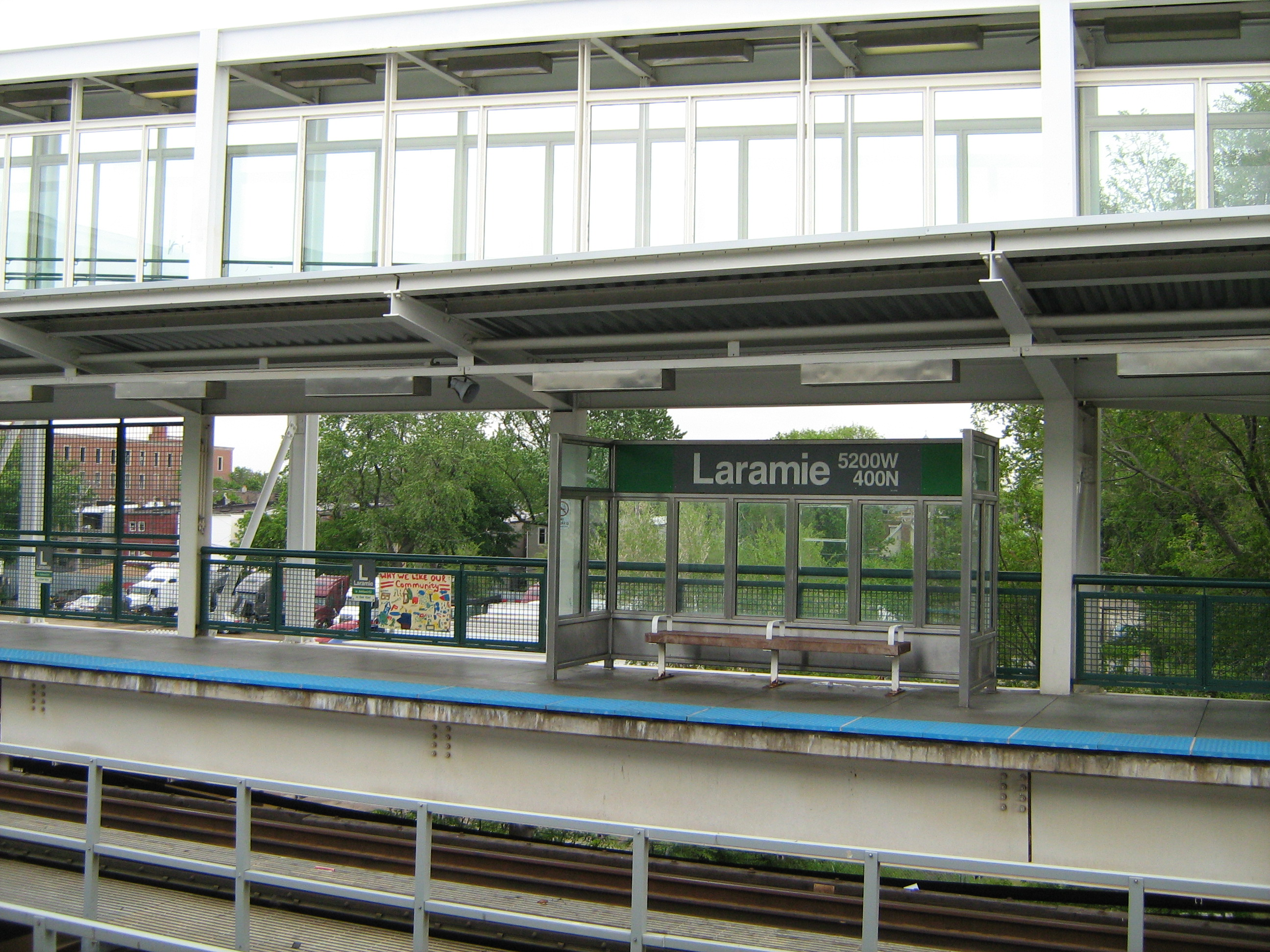
The Laramie station is one of the most structured along the Lake Branch

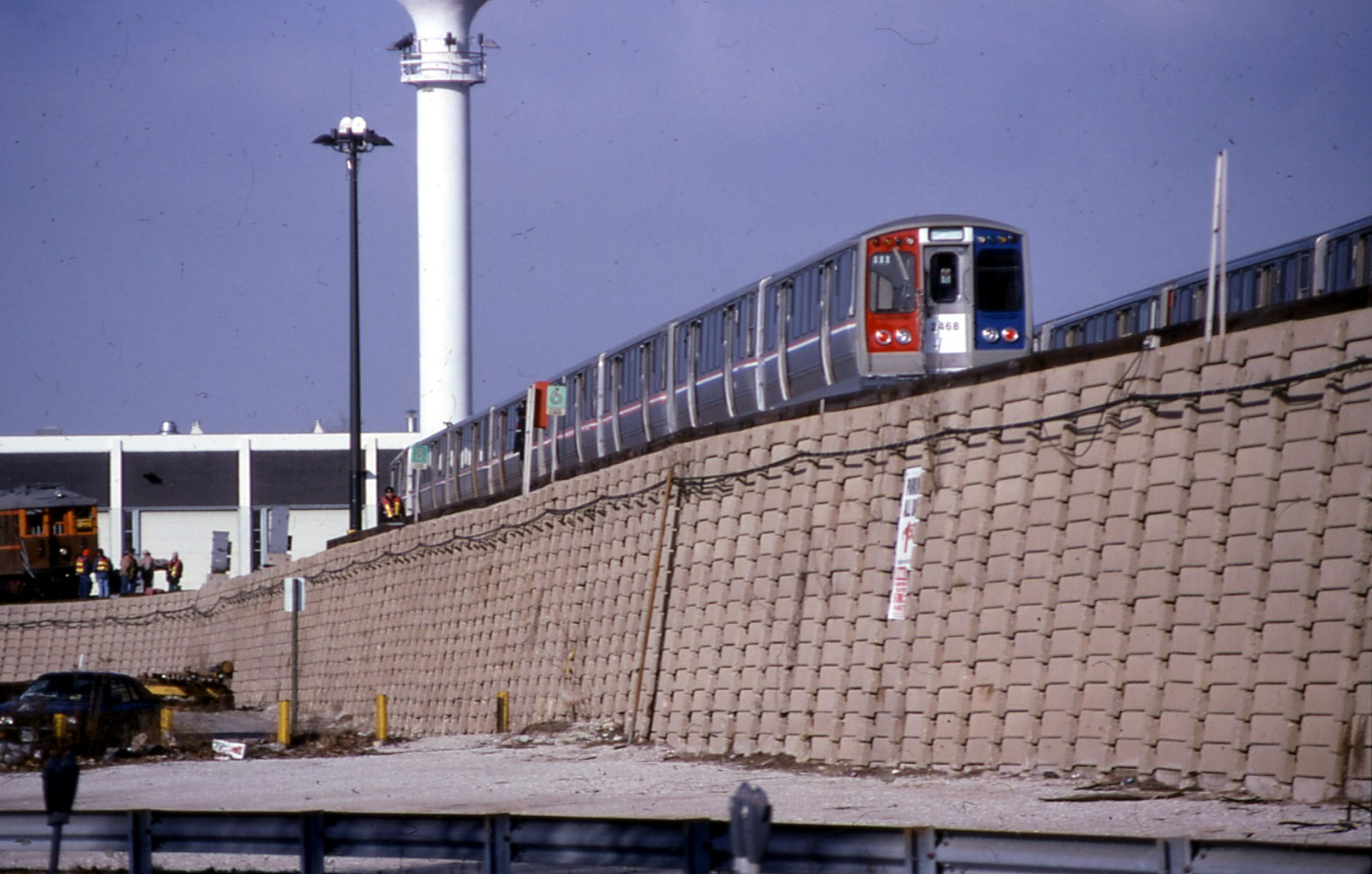
A Green Line train sits in the Harlem Yard

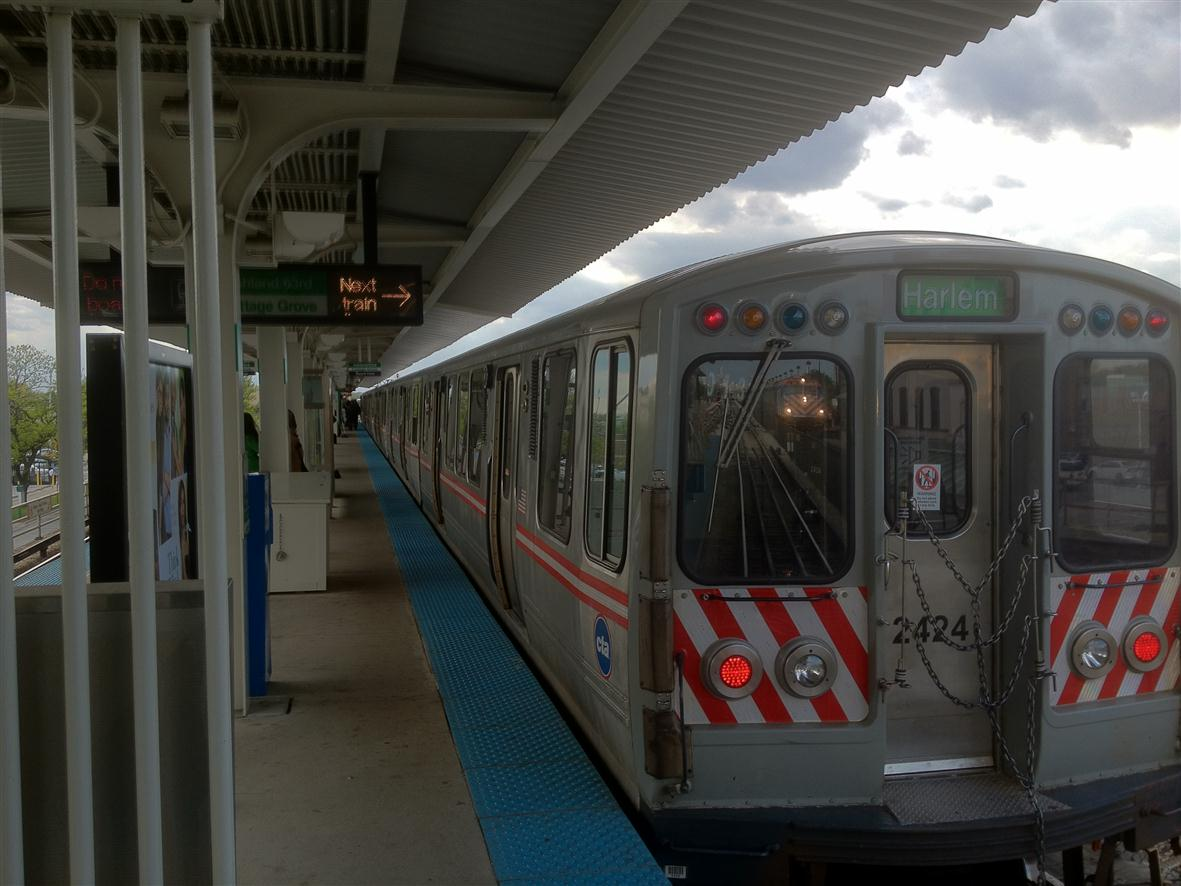
A Green Line train sits at the Harlem/Lake terminal

== See also ==
- Lake Street Elevated Railroad
