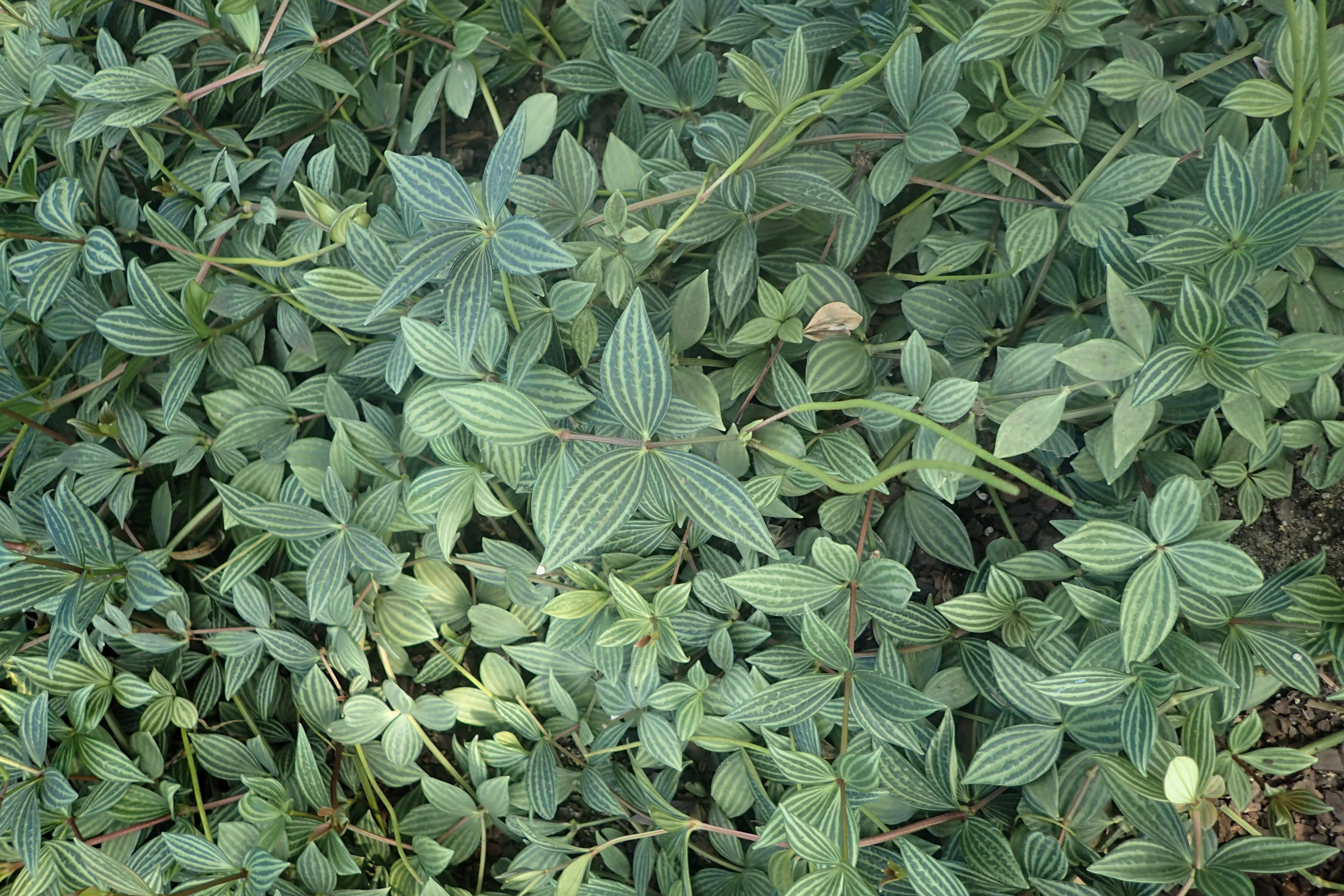
- Peperomia tetragona at the Garfield Park Conservatory

Scientific classification
- Kingdom: Plantae
- Clade: Tracheophytes
- Clade: Angiosperms
- Clade: Magnoliids
- Order: Piperales
- Family: Piperaceae
- Genus: Peperomia
- Species: P. tetragona

Binomial name
- Peperomia tetragona Ruiz & Pav.

Synonyms
- Piper tetragonum (Ruiz & Pav.) Vahl; Peperomia albostriata C.DC.; Peperomia puteolata Trel.

= Peperomia tetragona =

Species of plant

Peperomia tetragona is a species of flowering plant in the family Piperaceae. It is native to South America with a range from Ecuador, Peru, and Paraguay to central/western Brazil. Long grown as a houseplant in temperate climates, it is often known by its synonym Peperomia puteolata or as the parallel Peperomia for the parallel venation on its elliptical leaves.
