= Conservatory–Central Park Drive station =

Chicago "L" station

Conservatory– Central Park Dr 3600W 300N
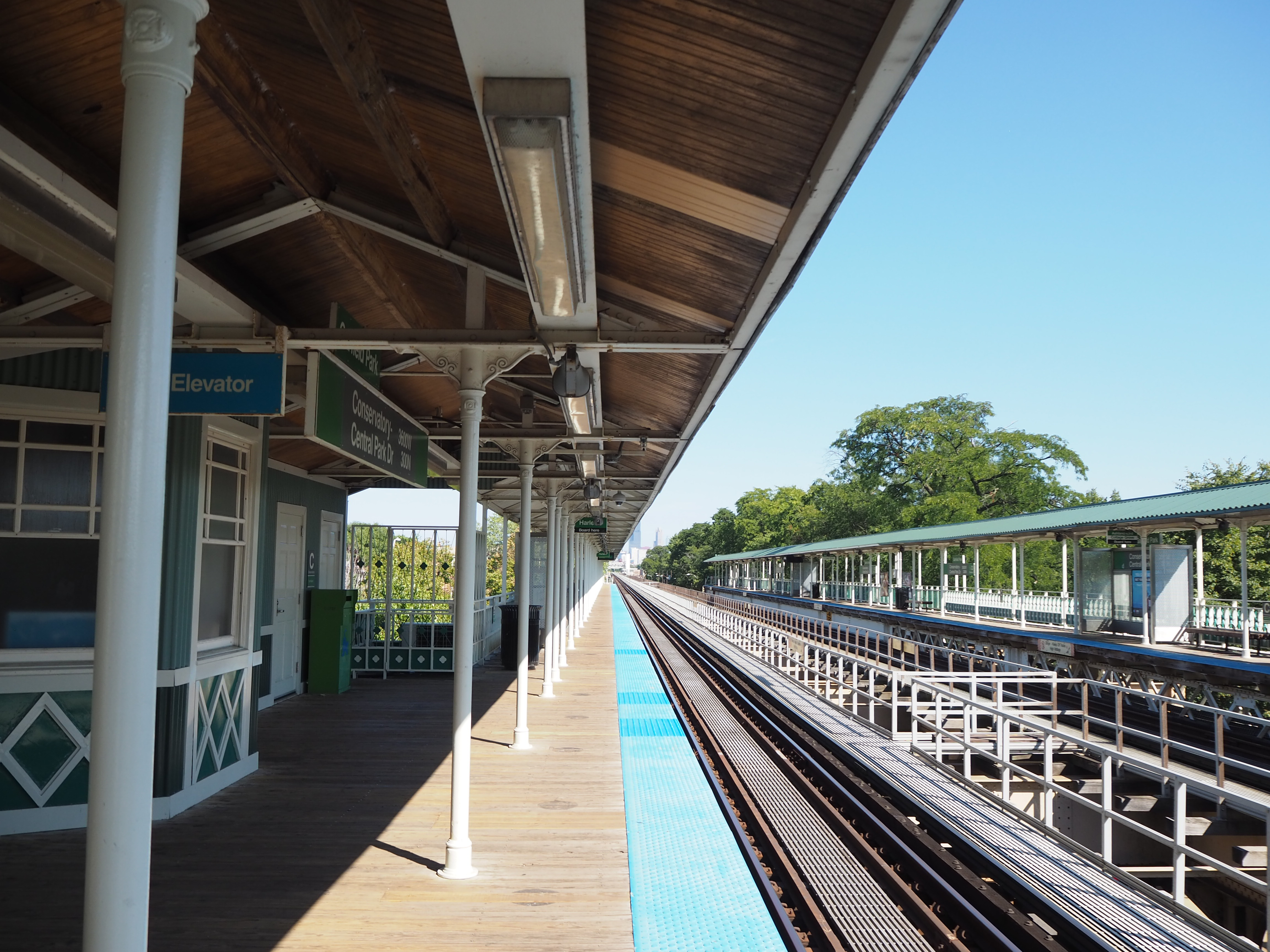

General information
- Location: 3630 West Lake Street; Chicago, Illinois 60624
- Coordinates: 41.884904°N 87.716523°W
- Owner: Chicago Transit Authority
- Line: Lake Branch
- Platforms: 2 side platforms
- Tracks: 2 tracks

Construction
- Structure type: Elevated
- Accessible: Yes

History
- Opened: June 30, 2001

Passengers
- 2025: 188,302 ▼1.6%

Services
Preceding station	Chicago "L"	Following station
Pulaski toward Harlem/Lake	Green Line	Kedzie toward Ashland/63rd or Cottage Grove
Track layout
Location

Conservatory–Central Park Drive is a station on the Chicago Transit Authority's 'L' system, serving the Green Line. The station opened on June 30, 2001. It is located in the East Garfield Park neighborhood and named for the Garfield Park Conservatory just outside the station.

Conservatory–Central Park Drive station replaced the former Homan station on the Lake Street Elevated two blocks east. During construction of the station, the Homan historic station house was moved to its current location.

== History ==
=== Homan station ===
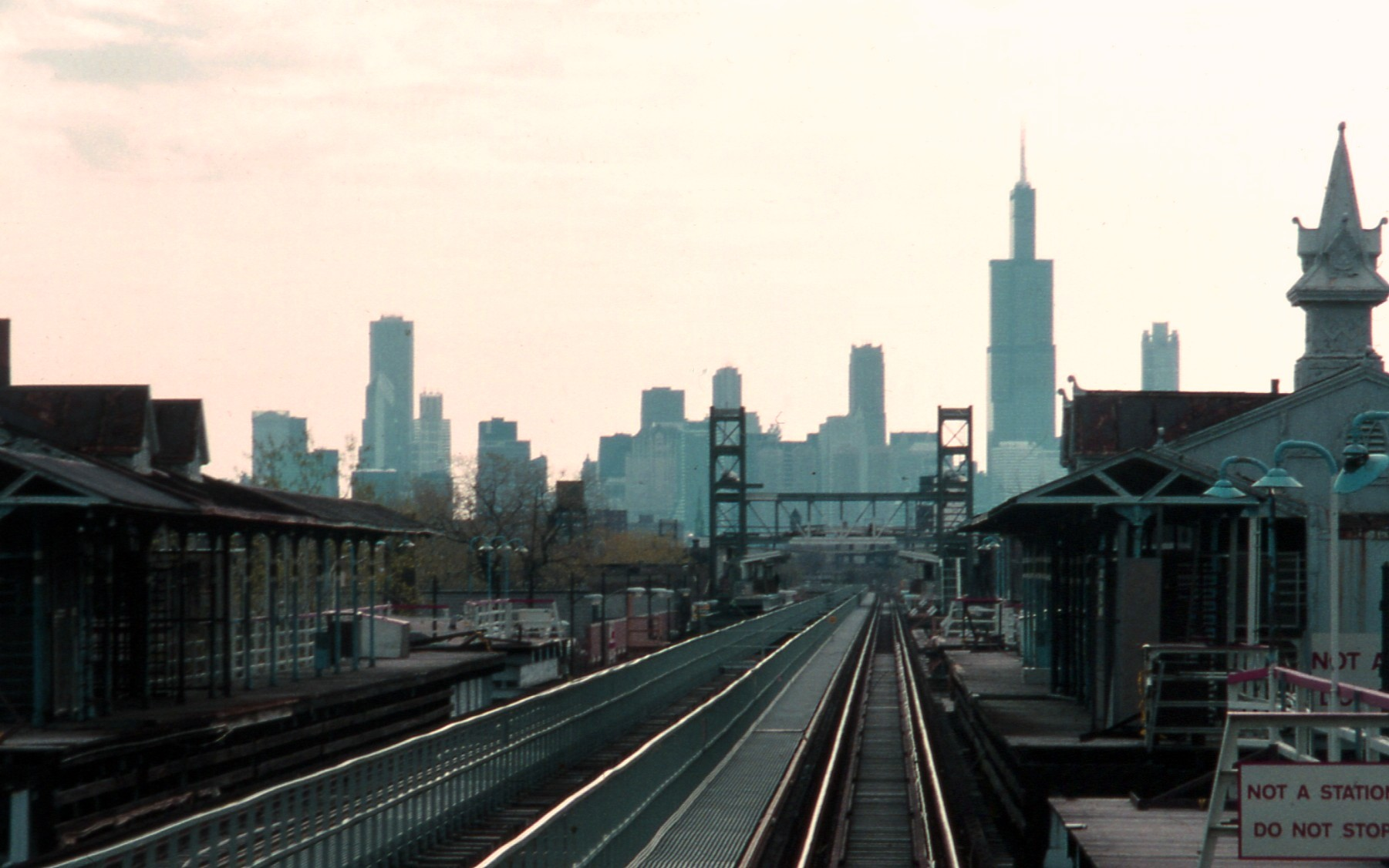
Homan station (foreground) during its indefinite abandonment (1996)

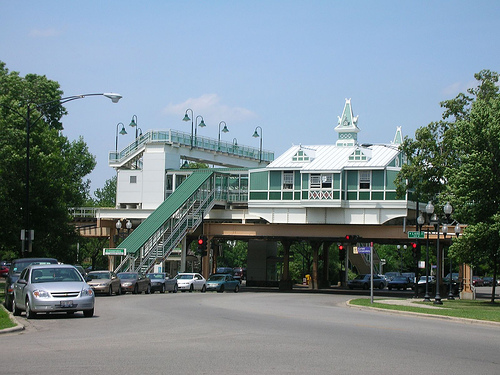
Exterior of the station

Homan was a station on the Green Line at Homan Avenue and Lake Street in the East Garfield Park neighborhood. Homan opened in March 1894, but it was closed on January 9, 1994, when the entire Green Line was closed for renovation. The station did not reopen with the rest of the Green Line on May 12, 1996.

=== Current station ===
In 1997, the CTA began working with the Illinois Historic Preservation Division on a plan to preserve the historic station house by moving it two blocks west to Central Park Drive near the Garfield Park Conservatory for a new station called Conservatory–Central Park Drive.

The new station would create equal spacing between the stations at Kedzie and Pulaski but would no longer have a direct bus connection to the #82 Kimball-Homan bus route. This created some controversy in the East Garfield Park community because residents said that they would have to walk through a high crime area to get to the bus from the new station. This was also around the time when the CTA had also eliminated the #16 Lake Street bus which ran underneath the Green Line tracks. The bus route was eliminated on October 5, 1997, due to budget cuts. The neighborhood also felt that the community leaders and the Mayor favored tourists who would use the new station to visit the Garfield Park Conservatory over local residents who needed the station to be located near a bus route.

On September 15, 1999, the CTA finished planning and released a project schedule to move the historic station house and use it to create a new station. The old Homan station was completely demolished by the spring of 2000, and put into storage to be later reconstructed at Central Park. Relocation of the former station house began in March 2001 and the project was finished on June 30, 2001, when the new station opened at Conservatory.
