= Laramie station (CTA Green Line) =

Chicago "L" station

Laramie 5200W 400N
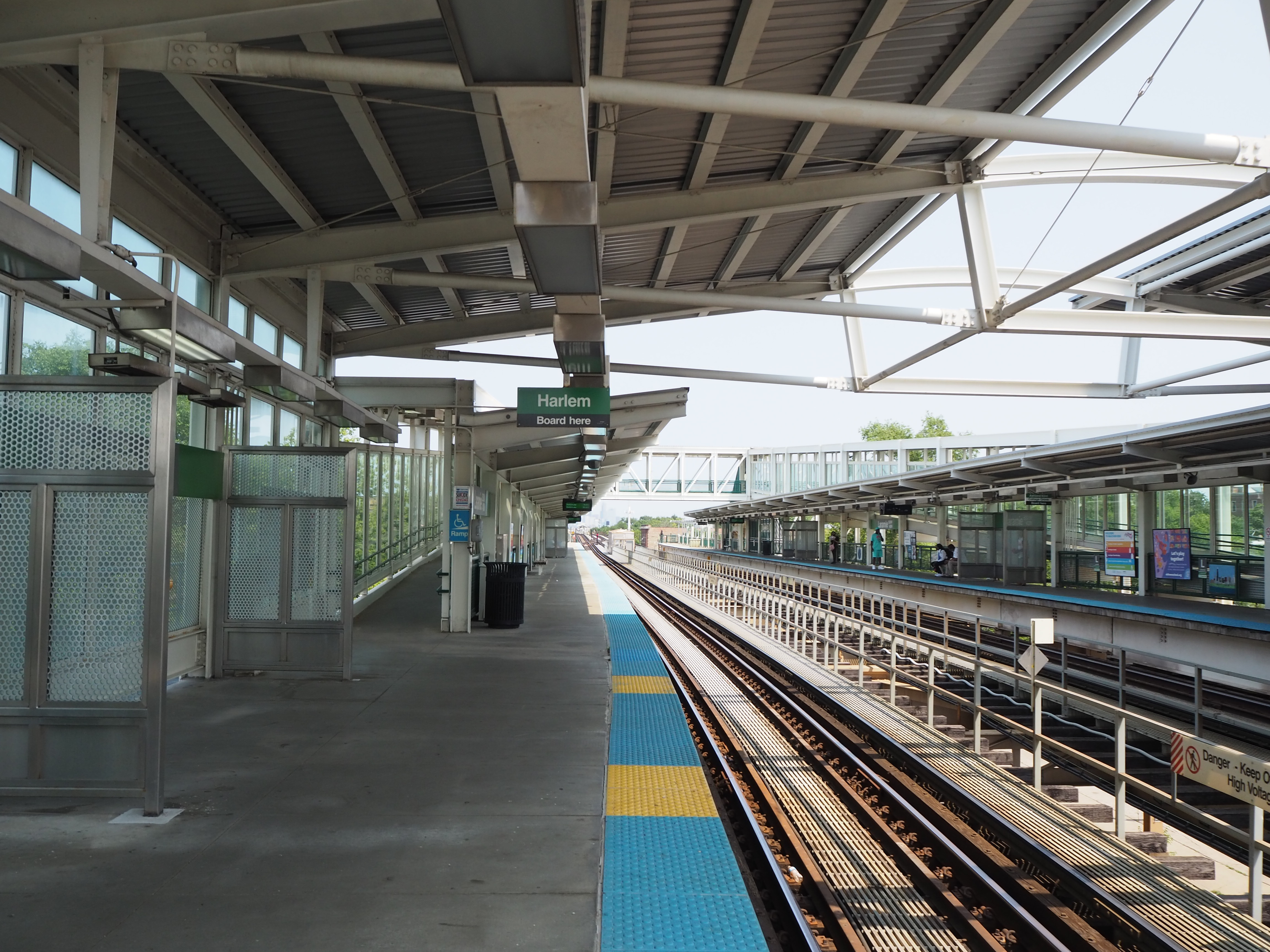

General information
- Location: 5148 West Lake Street; Chicago, Illinois 60644
- Coordinates: 41.887163°N 87.754986°W
- Owner: Chicago Transit Authority
- Line: Lake Branch
- Platforms: 2 side platforms
- Tracks: 2 tracks

Construction
- Structure type: Elevated
- Cycle facilities: Yes
- Accessible: Yes

History
- Opened: April 29, 1894
- Rebuilt: 1899, 1996
- Former names: 52nd Avenue

Passengers
- 2025: 200,724 ▼0.9%

Services
Preceding station	Chicago "L"	Following station
Central toward Harlem/Lake	Green Line	Cicero toward Ashland/63rd or Cottage Grove
Track layout
Location

Laramie is a station on the Chicago Transit Authority's 'L' system, serving the Green Line and the Austin neighborhood on the West Side. It opened on April 29, 1894, as a terminus of the Lake Street Elevated Railroad. Going eastbound, Laramie is the first station above Lake Street; the line follows an elevated embankment to Harlem/Lake and transitions from an elevated structure to the embankment immediately to the west of the station.

== Station layout ==
The station consists of two tracks and two concrete side platforms. The entrance to the station is adjacent to the eastbound platform, with passengers accessing the westbound platform via a bridge over the tracks. However, there are exit-only staircases on the westbound platform for disembarking passengers.

== Bus connections ==
CTA

- 57 Laramie
