= Garfield Park Conservatory =

Greenhouse conservatory in Chicago, US

Coordinates: 41°53′11″N 87°43′2″W

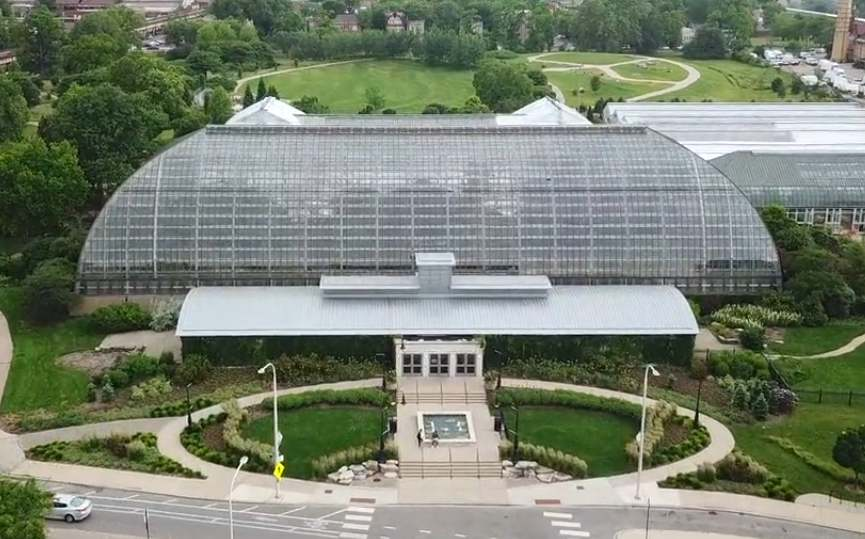
- Established: 1880s, present structure 1908
- Location: 300 N. Central Park Avenue; Chicago, Illinois, United States; 60624
- Director: Mary Eysenbach
- Public transit access: Green at Conservatory–Central Park Drive
- Website: Garfield Park Conservatory

Garfield Park Conservatory, located in Garfield Park in Chicago, is one of the largest greenhouse conservatories in the United States. Often referred to as "landscape art under glass", the Garfield Park Conservatory occupies approximately 4.5 acres (18,000 m^{2}) inside and out and contains a number of permanent plant exhibits incorporating specimens from around the world, including some cycads that are over 200 years old.

Along with the Lincoln Park Conservatory on Chicago's north side, the Garfield Park Conservatory provides significant horticultural collections, educational programs and community outreach efforts.

== History ==
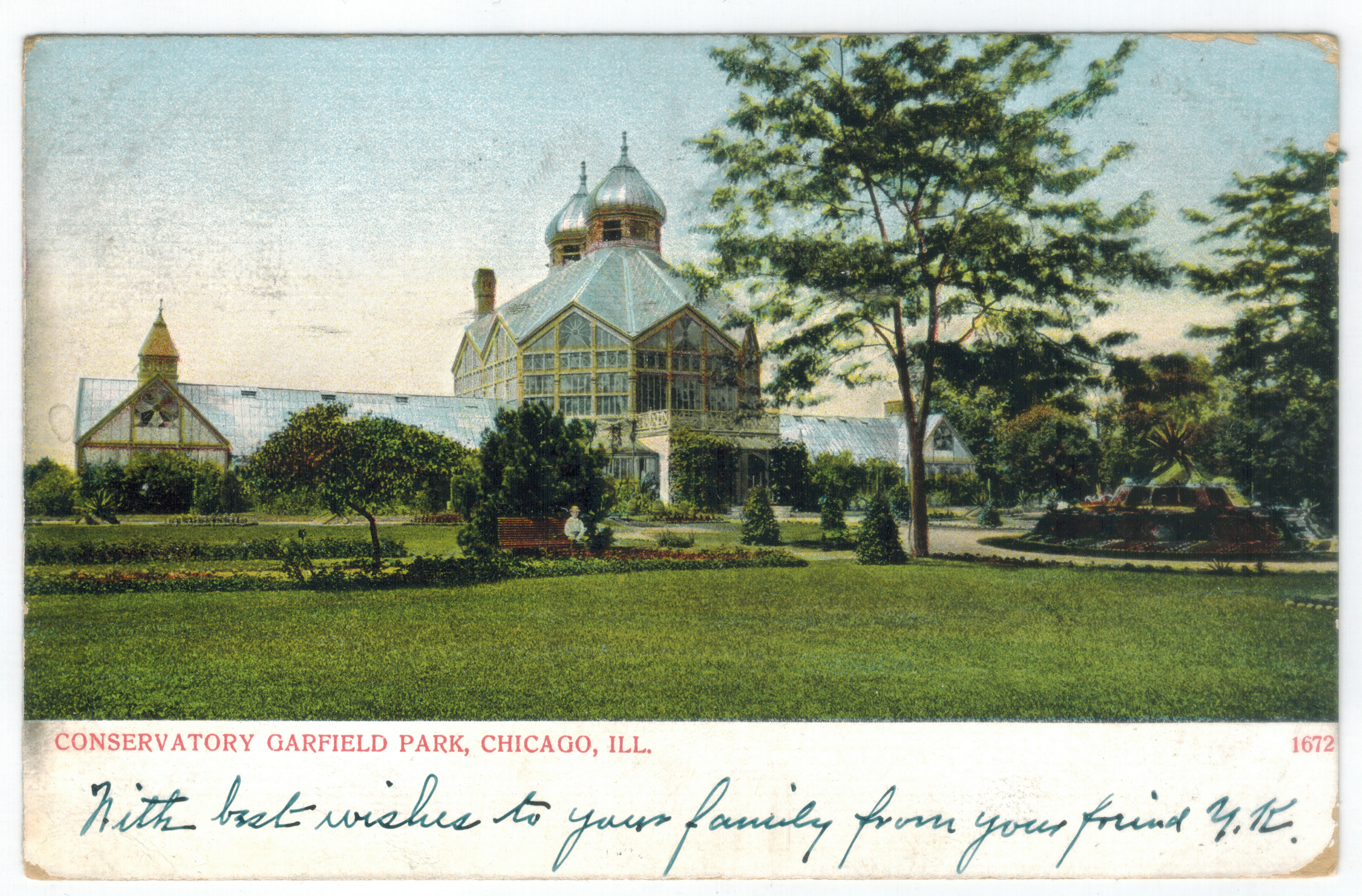
The first conservatory in Garfield Park

In the late 19th century, each of the three large West Side parks had its own small conservatory and propagation greenhouses. After 20 years of use, these conservatories had fallen into a state of disrepair and had become obsolete.

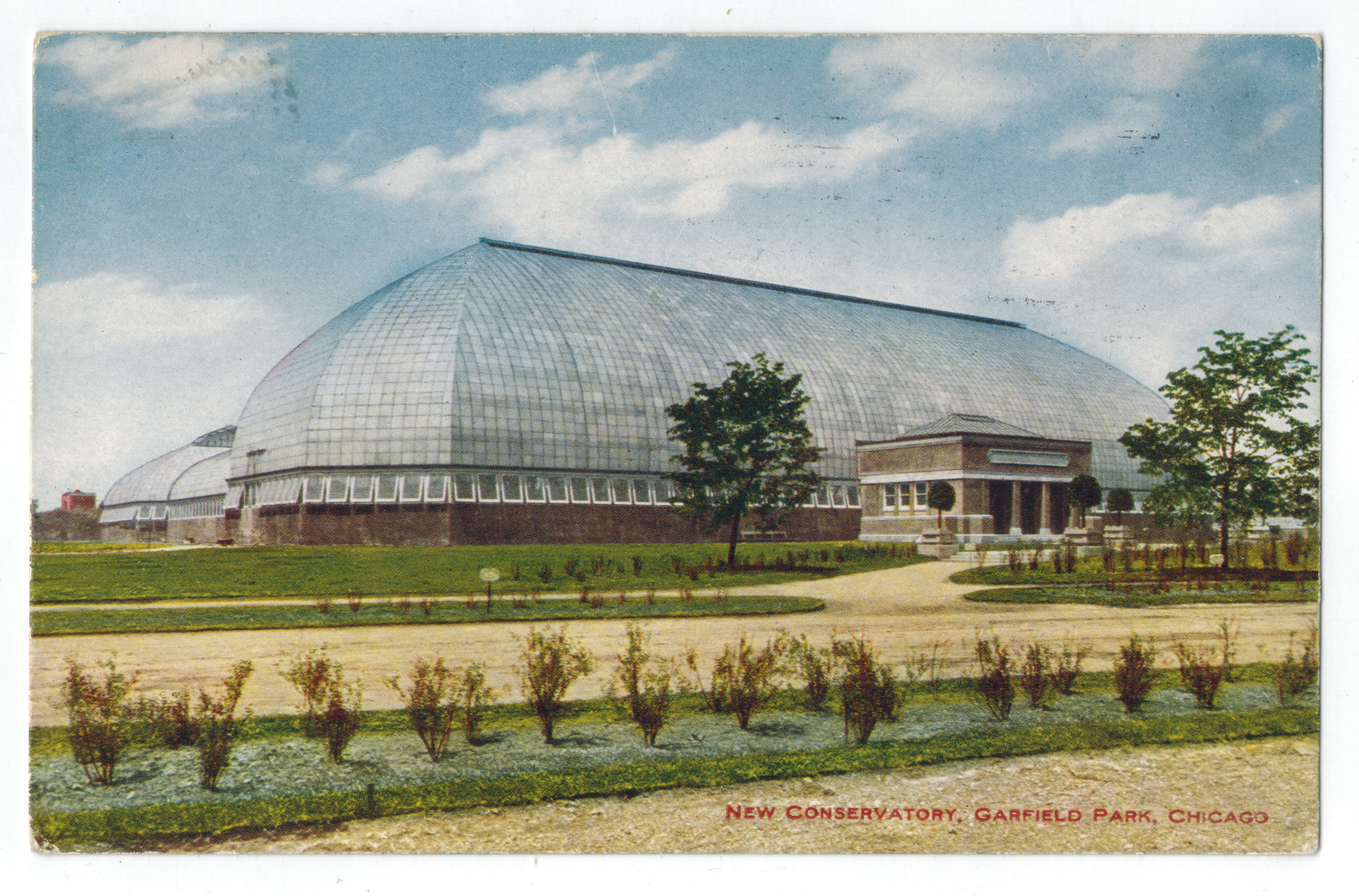
The 'new' conservatory, completed in 1907

In 1905, Chicago's West Park Commission's general superintendent and chief landscape architect, Jens Jensen, demolished the three smaller greenhouses in Humboldt, Douglass, and Garfield parks to create what was intended as "the largest publicly owned conservatory under one roof in the world" in Garfield Park. Many of the original plantings came from the three smaller Westside conservatories.

Constructed between 1906 and 1907, the Garfield Park Conservatory was designed by Jensen in collaboration with Prairie School architects Schmidt, Garden and Martin and the New York engineering firm of Hitchings and Company.

Jensen conceived the conservatory as a series of naturalistic landscapes under glass, a revolutionary idea at the time. The simple yet strong shape of the structure, which is meant to emulate the haystacks of the Midwest, complements the collection of plants and foliage that it houses.

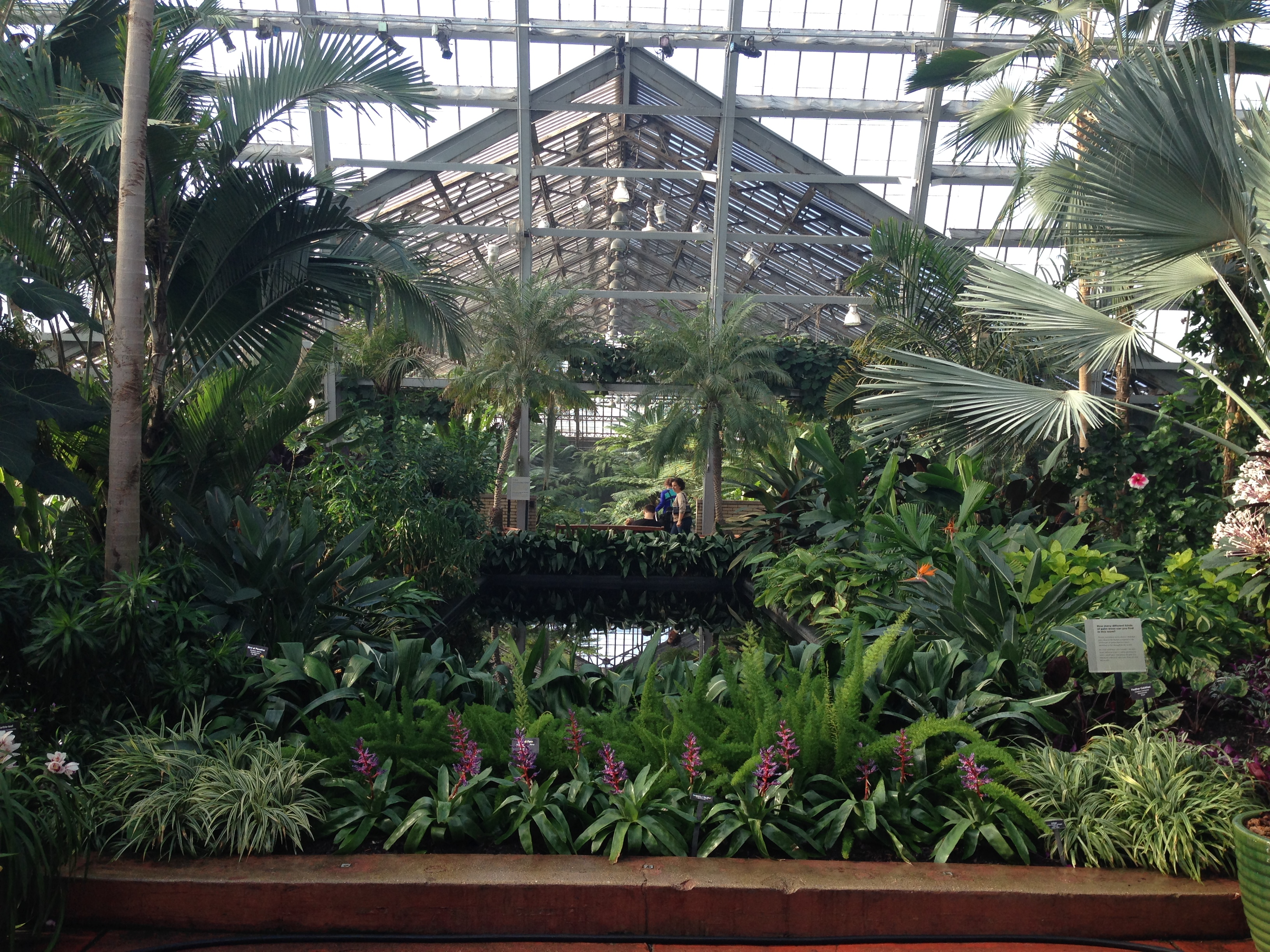
View of the Palm Room

Today, the conservatory still follows the original tenets of Jensen. One of the most popular rooms is the first presented to visitors, the Palm Room. In it are over 7 dozen varieties of palm trees of the over 2,700 varieties known to exist today. Of particular importance is the double coconut palm, first grown by employees of the conservatory in 1959. The double coconut palm is found only off the coast of South Africa in its native environment and produces what is believed to be the largest seed of any plant in the world, weighing up to 50 lb (23 kg). The double coconut palm at the conservatory died of currently unknown causes in February 2012. Because of the species' rarity in the wild, and the challenges of cultivation, it is not expected to be replaced.

After many decades of neglect, the conservatory underwent a multimillion-dollar restoration in 1994. The non-profit Garfield Park Conservatory Alliance formed to help maintain the structure and provide programs and services for visitors.

In a hailstorm on the night of June 30, 2011, the conservatory suffered catastrophic damage to glass in showrooms as well as production houses where plants are grown or stored. Five recently renovated showrooms contained laminated glass and therefore sustained less damage. Some areas reopened to the public July 3. The Fern Room reopened December 1, 2011, and the remaining areas opened January 24, 2012. To help raise money for the repairs local artist Bryan Northup created, and the Conservatory sold, limited-edition bowls out of the broken glass.

After a multi-year renovation, the Elizabeth Morse Genius Children’s Garden is scheduled to reopen to the public on May 1, 2026, now with a toddler zone, an art and nature zone, accommodations for disabled children, and a twenty-foot climbing structure dubbed the "High-Biscus Climber." On November 5, 2026, the conservatory opened the 4-acre (1.6 ha) outdoor Child Wild Exploration Garden, featuring natural landscaping, interactive discovery zones and shade structures.

The Garfield Park Conservatory is also known to be a place where people have illegally abandoned their pets, often lizard and other reptiles. Staff try to rescue them and are sometimes successful at capturing them and connecting them with local animal rescue groups, but those that remain are fed and cared for. The majority of the animals residing at the Garfield Park Conservatory are red-eared sliders. They can often be found sunbathing in the Fern Room, and have been highlighted in a coloring sheet available at the conservatory.

== Awards and honors ==
In 2012, the conservatory won the National Medal for Museum and Library Services. In celebration of the 2018 Illinois Bicentennial, Garfield Park Conservatory was selected as one of the Illinois 200 Great Places by the American Institute of Architects Illinois component (AIA Illinois).

== Gallery ==
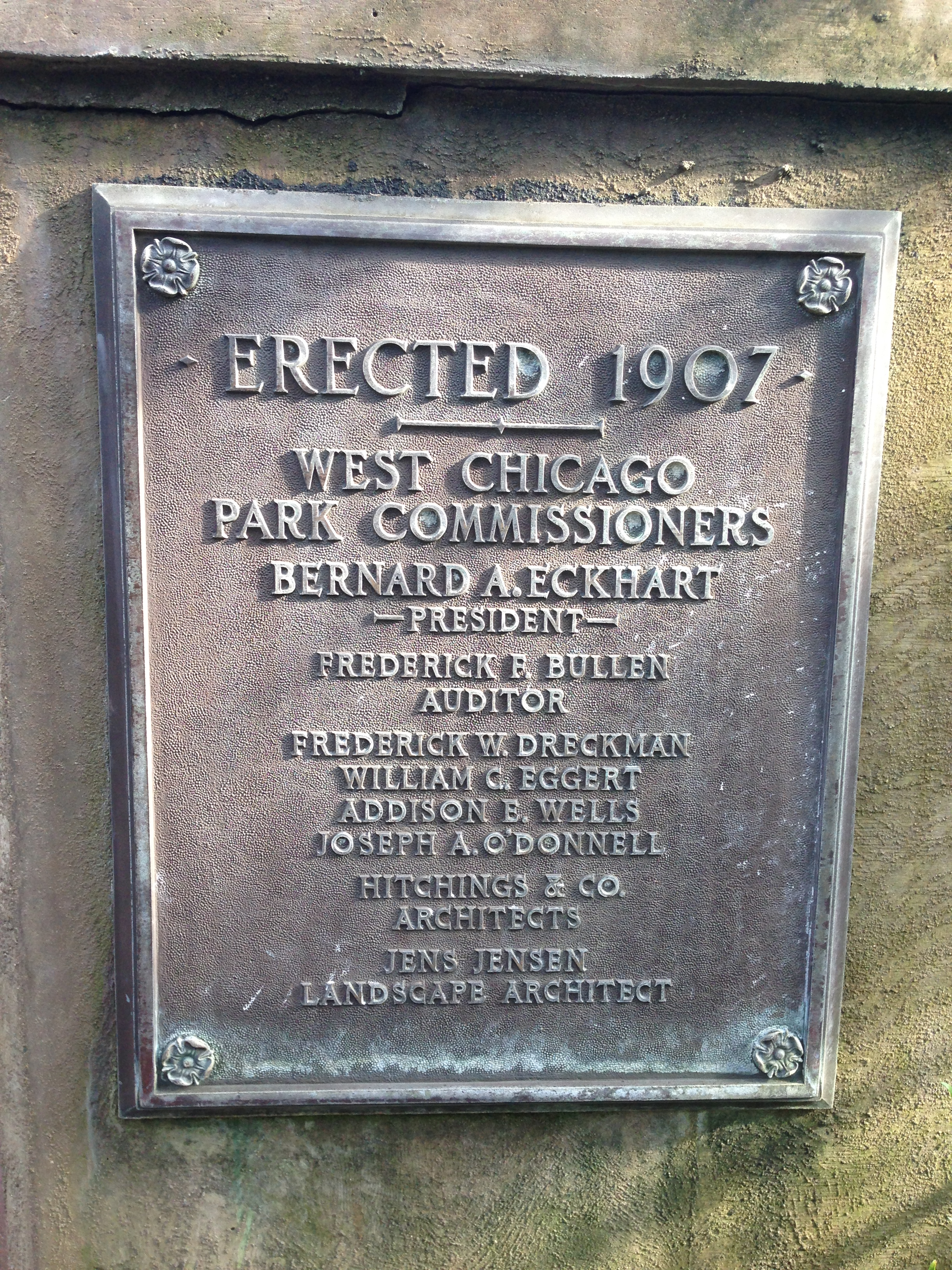
Historical plaque.

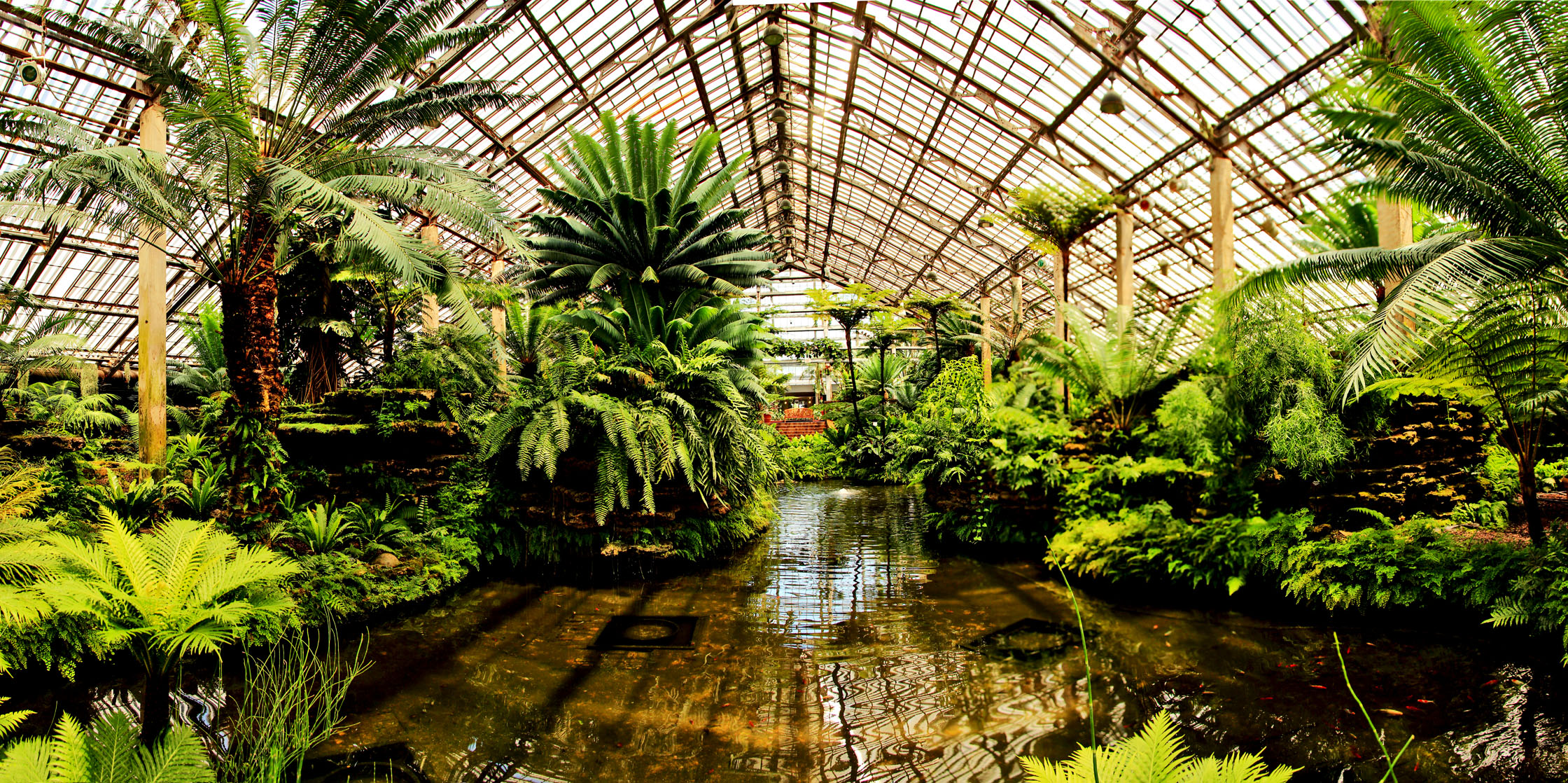
Inside the conservatory.

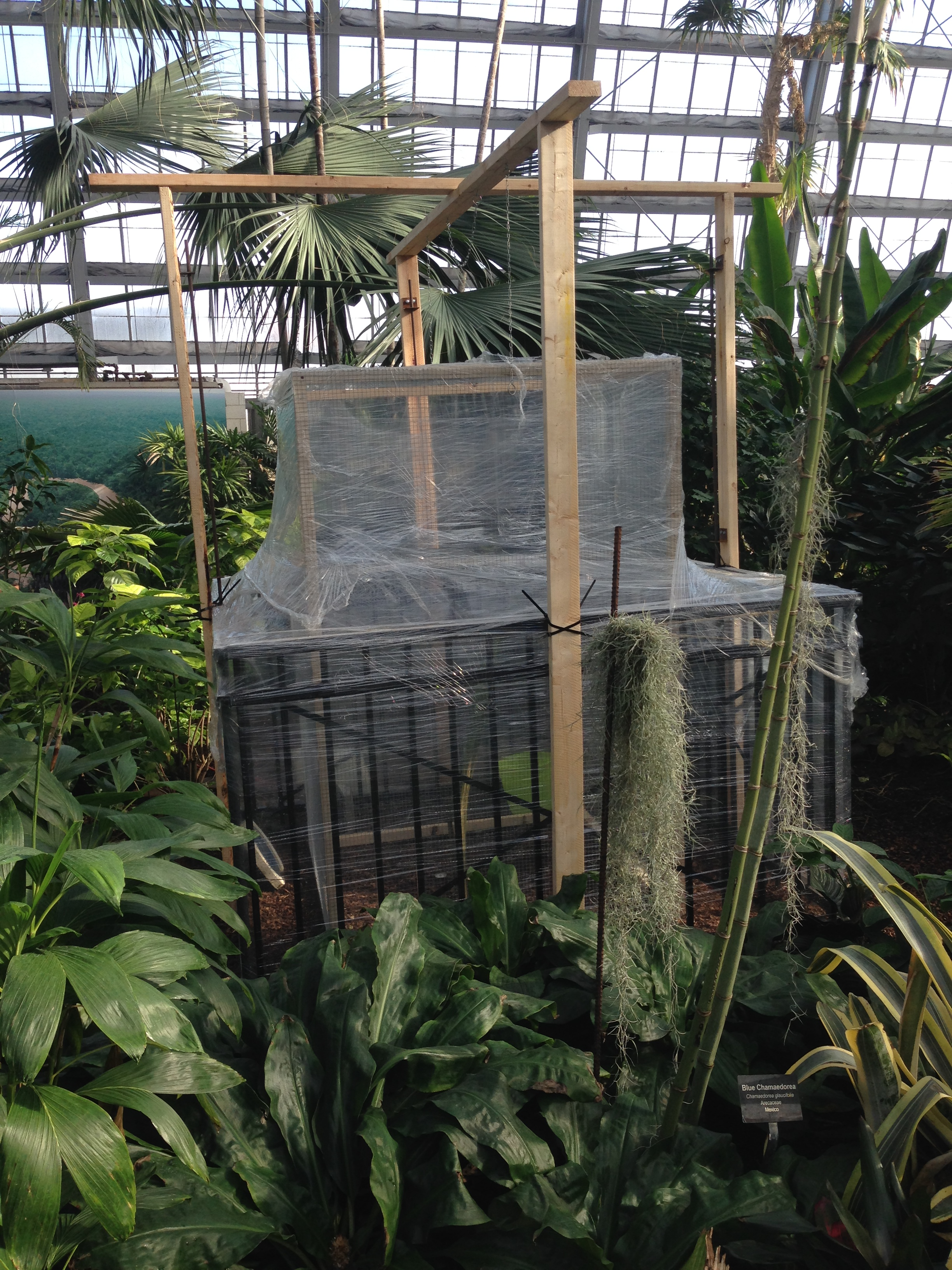
Conservation work of an endangered coco de mer seed.

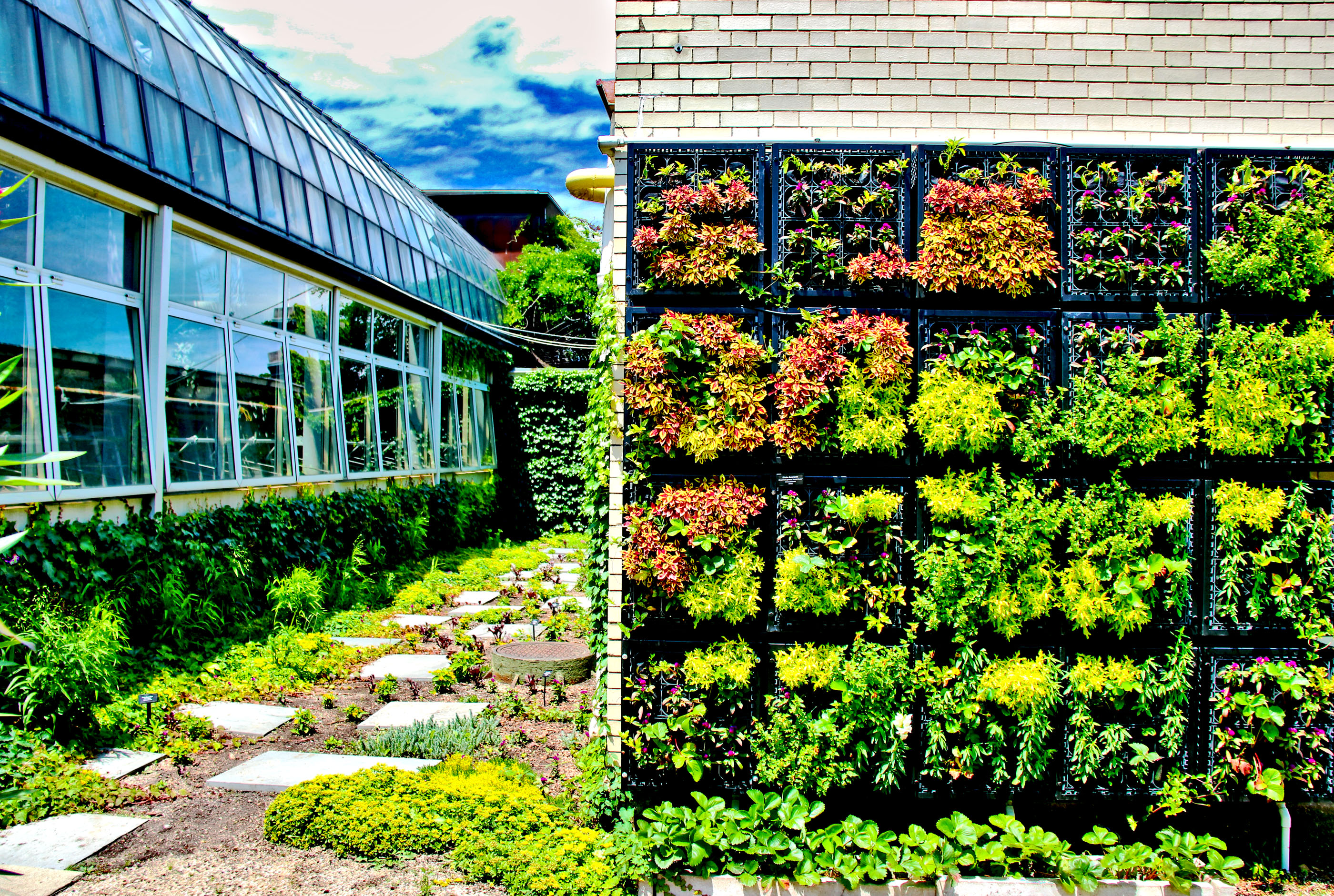
Living wall display at the conservatory.

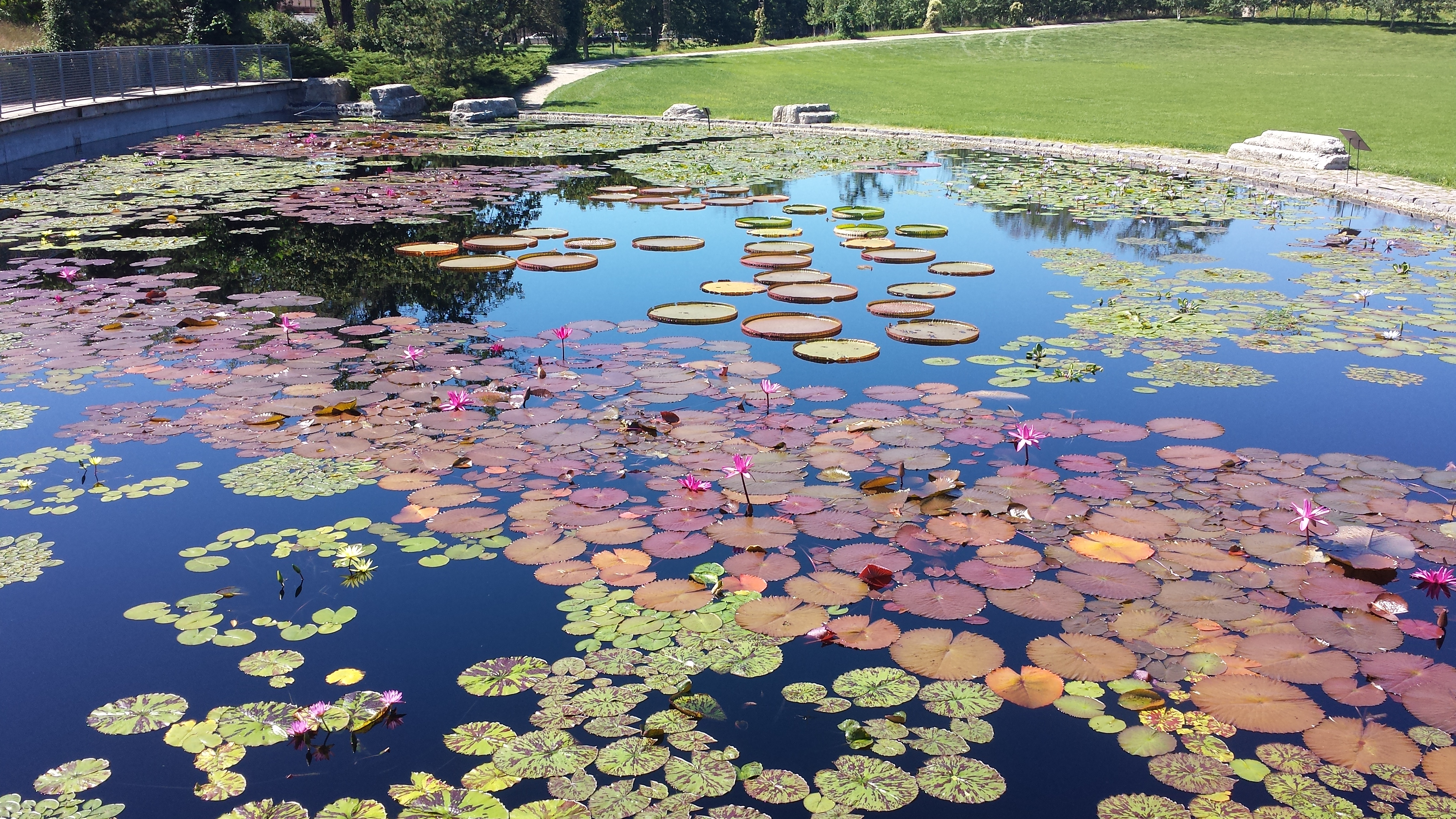
Water Lily Pond.

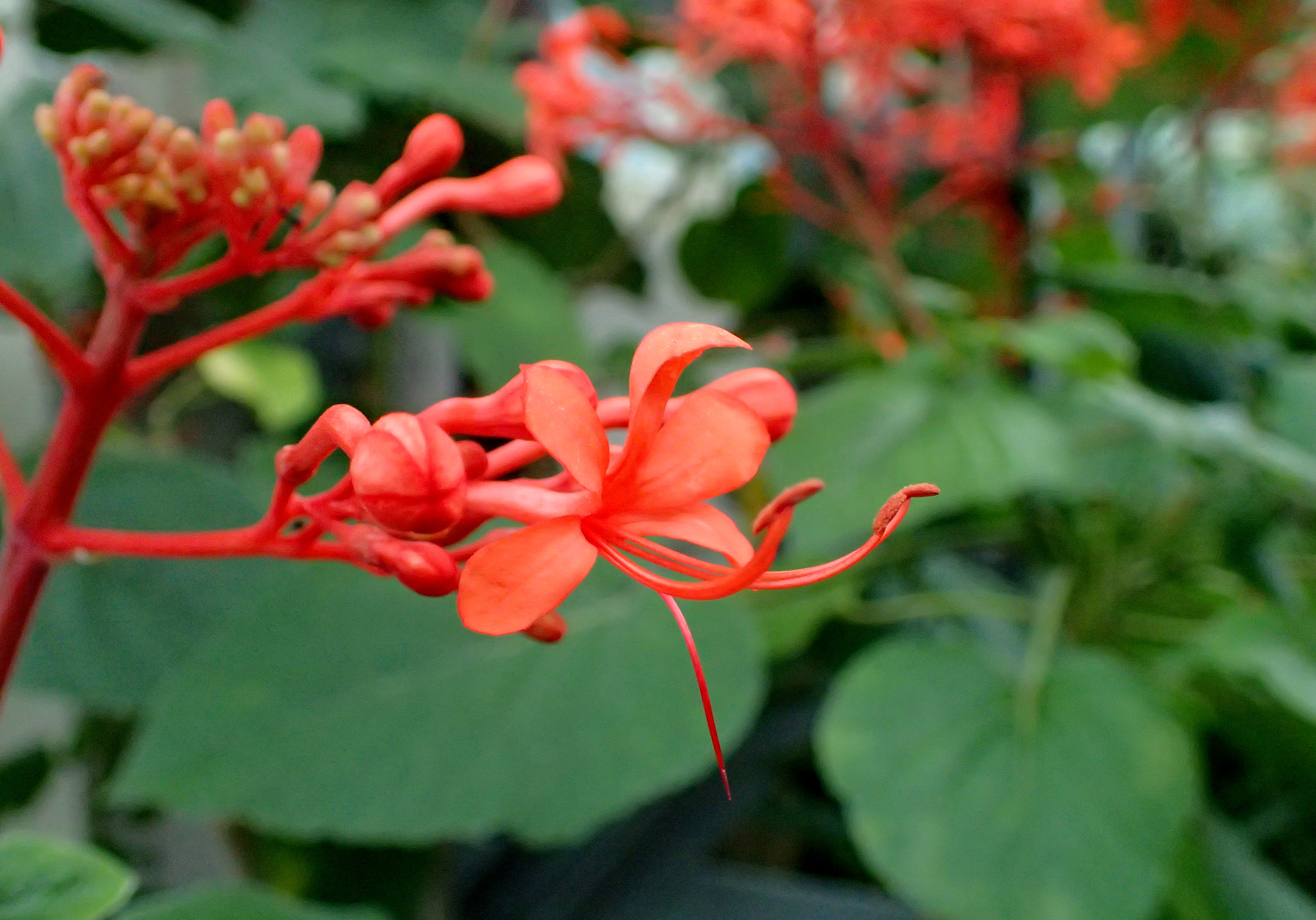
(Clerodendrum speciosissimum)

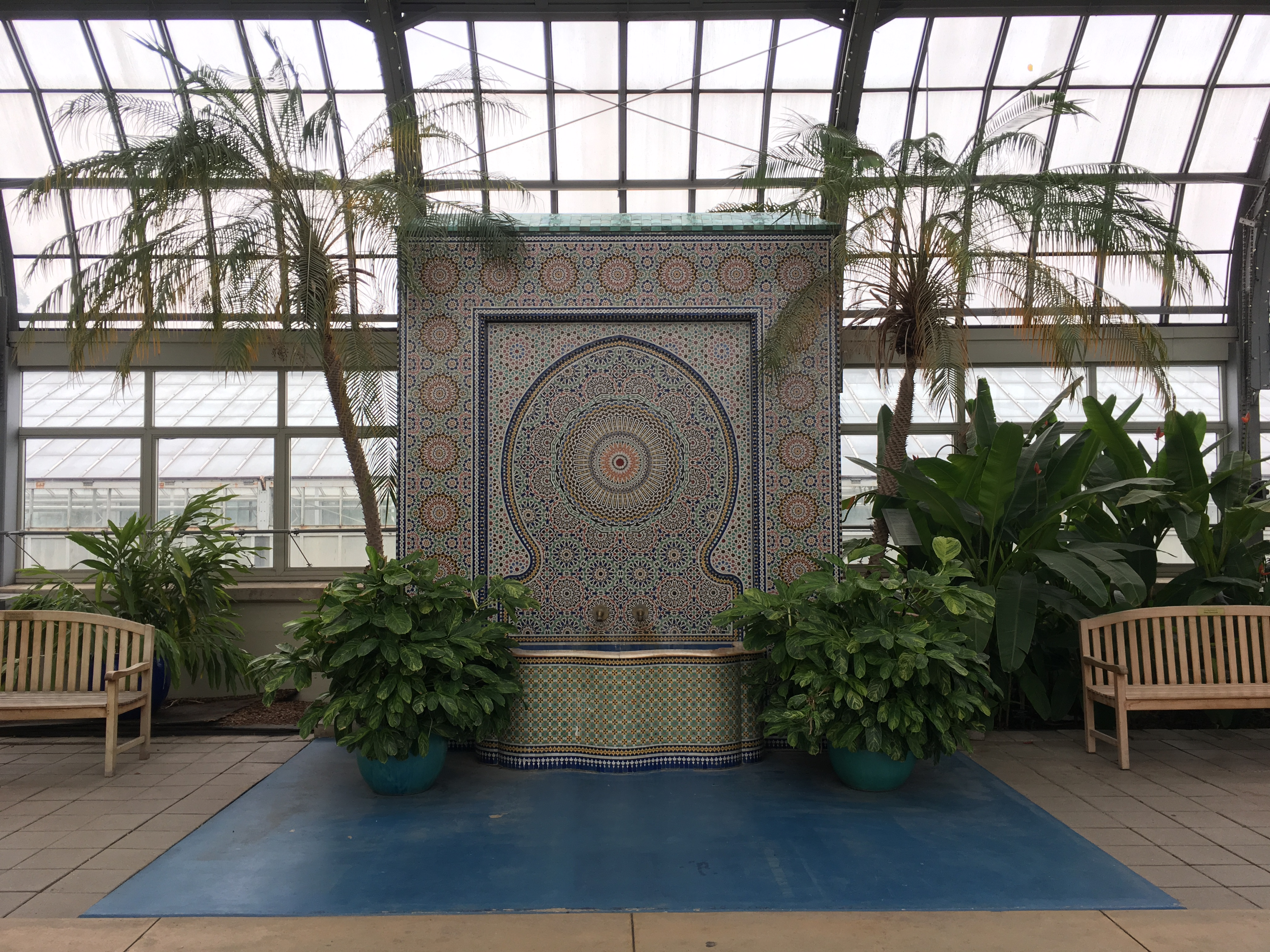
A traditional Moroccan fountain

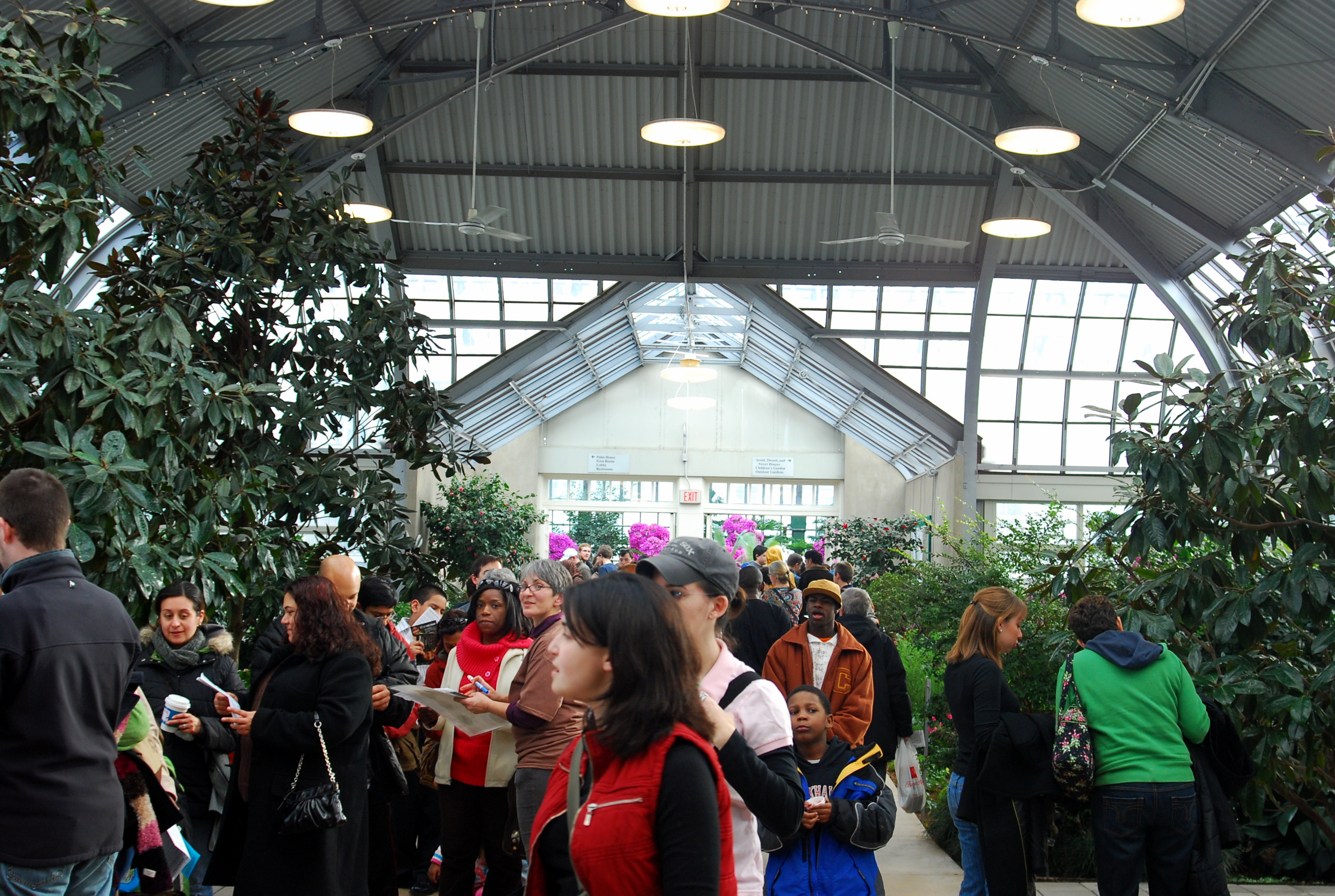
Chocolate Fest event.

Aerial footage of the conservatory. (Video)

== See also ==
- List of botanical gardens in the United States
- List of museums and cultural institutions in Chicago
