= Lake Street Elevated Railroad =

Rapid transit line in Chicago, Illinois

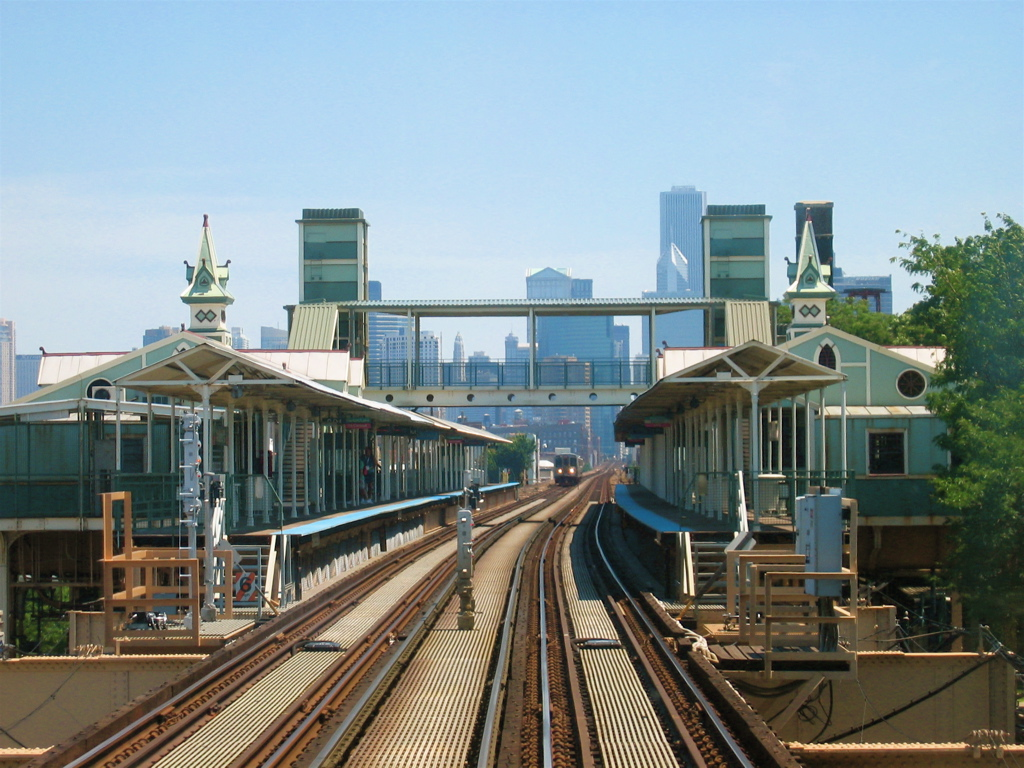
- Ashland station, one of the original stations on the Lake Street "L"

Overview
- Locale: Chicago, Illinois

Service
- Type: Rapid transit
- Operator(s): Lake Street Elevated Railroad Company (1893–1904); Chicago and Oak Park Elevated Railroad (1904–1924)

History
- Opened: 1893
- Closed: 1924 (merged into Chicago Rapid Transit Company)

Technical
- Character: Elevated
- Track gauge: 4 ft 8 1/2 in (1,435 mm) standard gauge
- Electrification: Third rail, Trolley wire 600 V DC

The Lake Street Elevated Railroad was the second permanent elevated rapid transit line to be constructed in Chicago, Illinois. The first section of the line opened in November 1893. Its route is still used today as part of the Green Line route of the Chicago "L" system.

== History ==
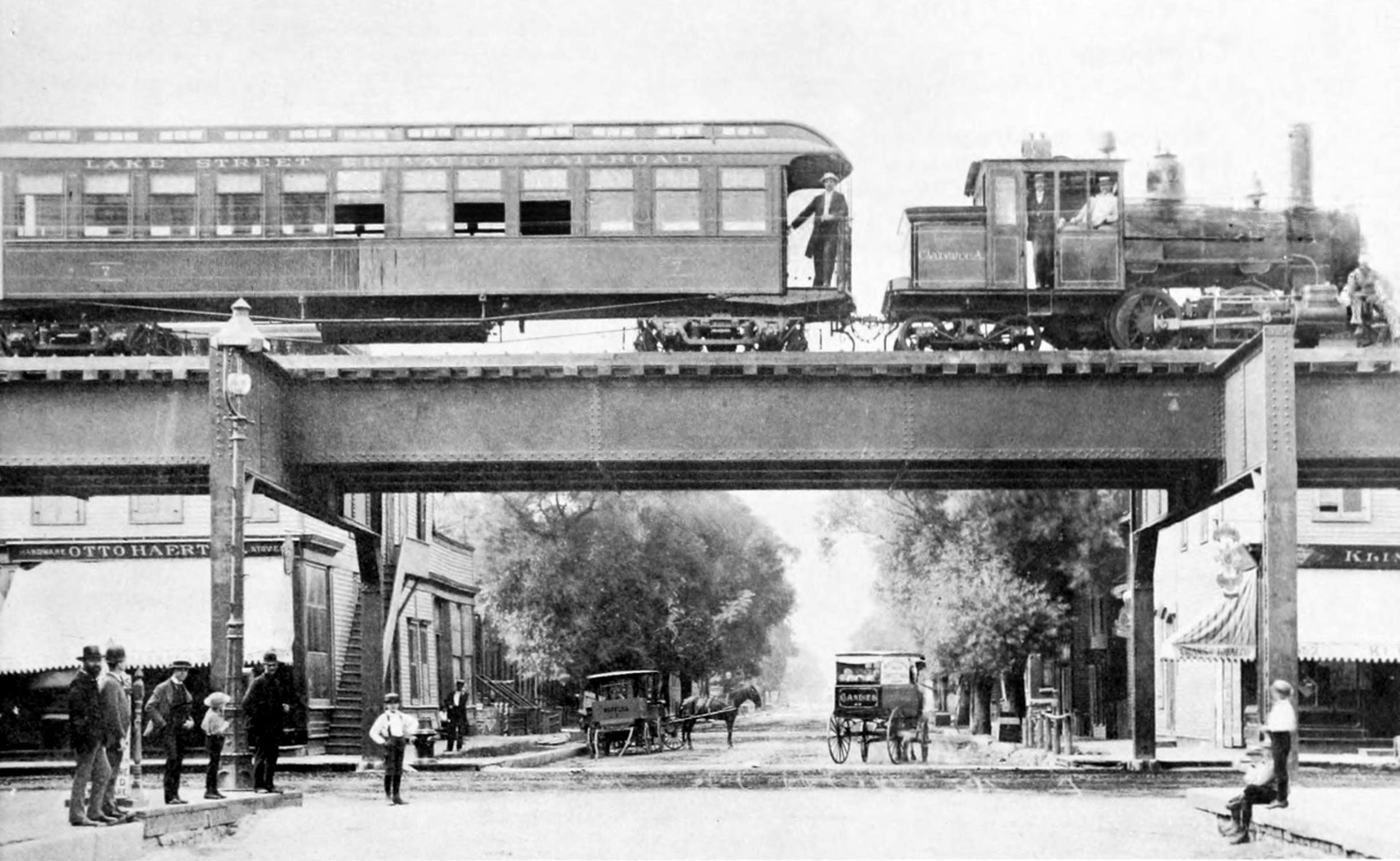
The coal-burning steam locomotive "Clarence A" on the Lake Street Elevated Railroad, 1893

The Lake Street Elevated Railway Company was chartered on February 7, 1888, and granted a 25-year franchise by the city council to build an elevated railroad above Lake Street from Canal Street to the city limits. It was originally planned that the line would use a steam-powered monorail system that had been developed by Joe Meigs in Cambridge, Massachusetts, however the company eventually chose to use more traditional steam locomotives.

Construction of the line began in 1889. Potential investors found the franchise too restrictive and a new 40 year franchise was awarded by the city council in November 1890, that allowed the railroad to extend to Market Street in downtown Chicago. By 1892 the company had debts of $17 million (equivalent to $595 million in 2024). It was sold to new owners, renamed the Lake Street Elevated Railroad Company, and a new charter was granted on August 24, 1892.

The first section, running from the downtown terminal at Market Street and Madison to California Avenue opened to the public in October 1893. The line was completed to 52nd Avenue (Laramie)—a total length of 6.4 miles (10.3 km)—in April 1894. Service was extended to Austin Avenue in (what was then) the suburb of Austin via a section of track built at-grade in April 1899.
