= Harlem/Lake station =

Chicago "L" station

Harlem/Lake 1200W 100S
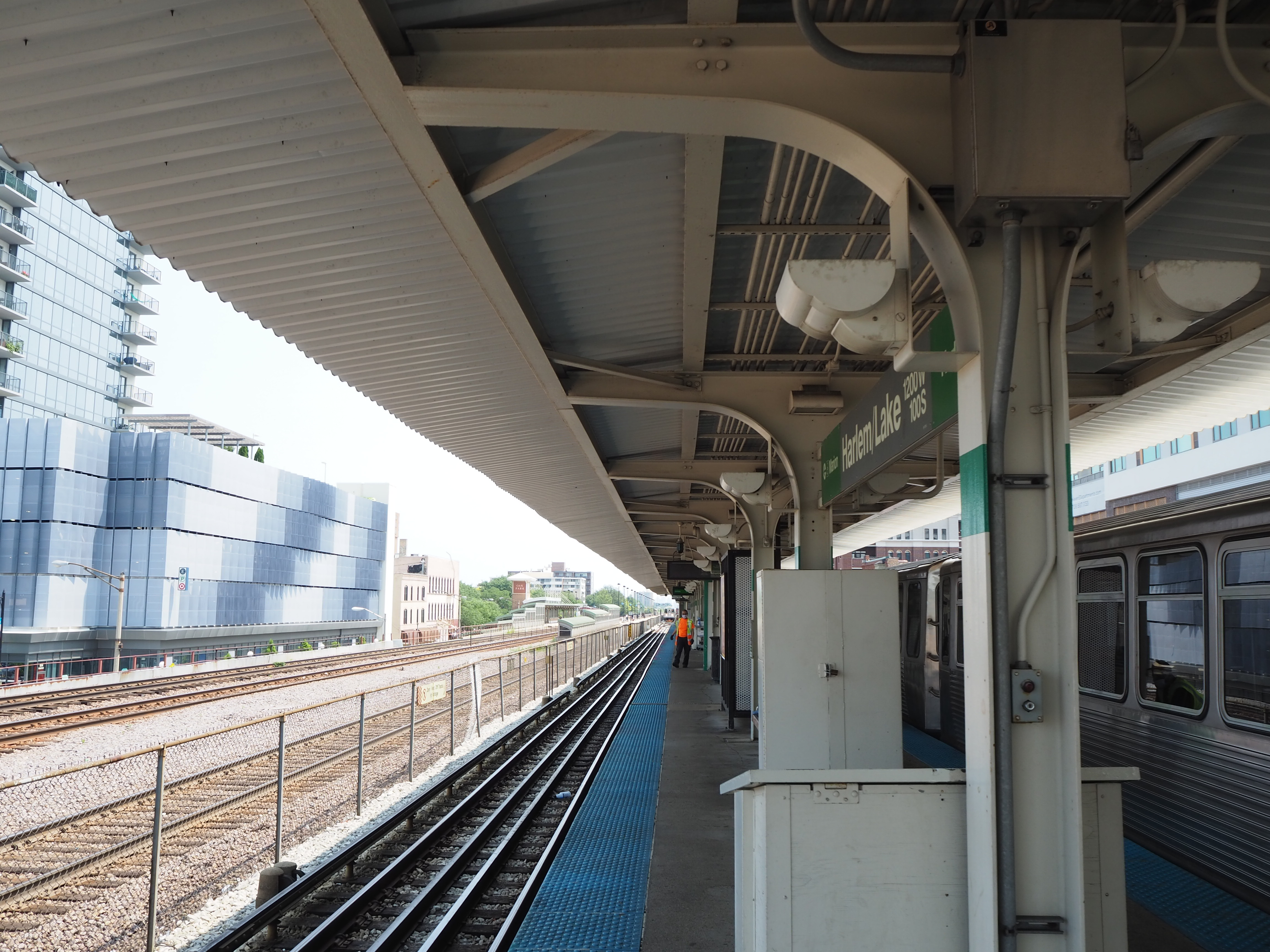
- Station platform, looking east. The Oak Park Metra station can be seen in the background.

General information
- Location: 1 South Harlem Avenue; Forest Park, Illinois 60130
- Coordinates: 41.88706°N 87.80486°W
- Owner: Chicago Transit Authority
- Line: Lake Branch
- Platforms: 1 Island platform
- Tracks: 2
- Connections: at Oak Park; CTA Buses; Pace Buses

Construction
- Structure type: Embankment
- Accessible: Yes

History
- Opened: October 28, 1962
- Rebuilt: 1996
- Former names: Harlem Terminal; Harlem

Passengers
- 2025: 704,657 ▲8.1%

Services
Preceding station	Chicago "L"	Following station
Terminus	Green Line	Oak Park toward Ashland/63rd or Cottage Grove
Track layout
Key
Location

Harlem/Lake, announced as Harlem, is a station on the Chicago Transit Authority's 'L' system, serving the Green Line. It is the northwestern terminus of the Green Line.

== History ==
Harlem destination sign

The station opened on October 28, 1962 and was formerly called Harlem Terminal. The Lake Street Elevated went further through Oak Park and was built to Marion Street in 1901 and extended just a few blocks west past Harlem Avenue to Forest Park station on May 20, 1910. It was built at street-level and the tracks also paralleled the adjacent Chicago & North Western Railroad and the street-level operation began to result a number of crossing accidents for both railroads, typically due to pedestrians and wagon drivers failing to take note of approaching trains. Neither the "L" nor the C&NW had any type of crossing protection originally. Harlem was a consolidation of the Forest Park and Marion stations.

== Location ==
The station is located at 1 South Harlem Avenue and is the northwestern terminus of the Green Line. Though the station is named Harlem/Lake, Lake Street does not intersect with the station; the station is located at Harlem Avenue and South Boulevard. The station is next to the Oak Park Metra commuter railroad station. It is located between the Oak Park and Forest Park boundary line at Harlem Avenue.

== Bus and rail connections ==
CTA

- 90 Harlem

Pace

- 307 Harlem
- 309 Lake Street
- 313 St. Charles Road
- 318 West North Avenue

Metra

- Union Pacific West (at Oak Park)

== See also ==
- Harlem (CTA Blue Line Congress branch station)
- Harlem (CTA Blue Line O'Hare branch station)
