= 2023 Chicago train crash =

2023 railway incident near Howard CTA station

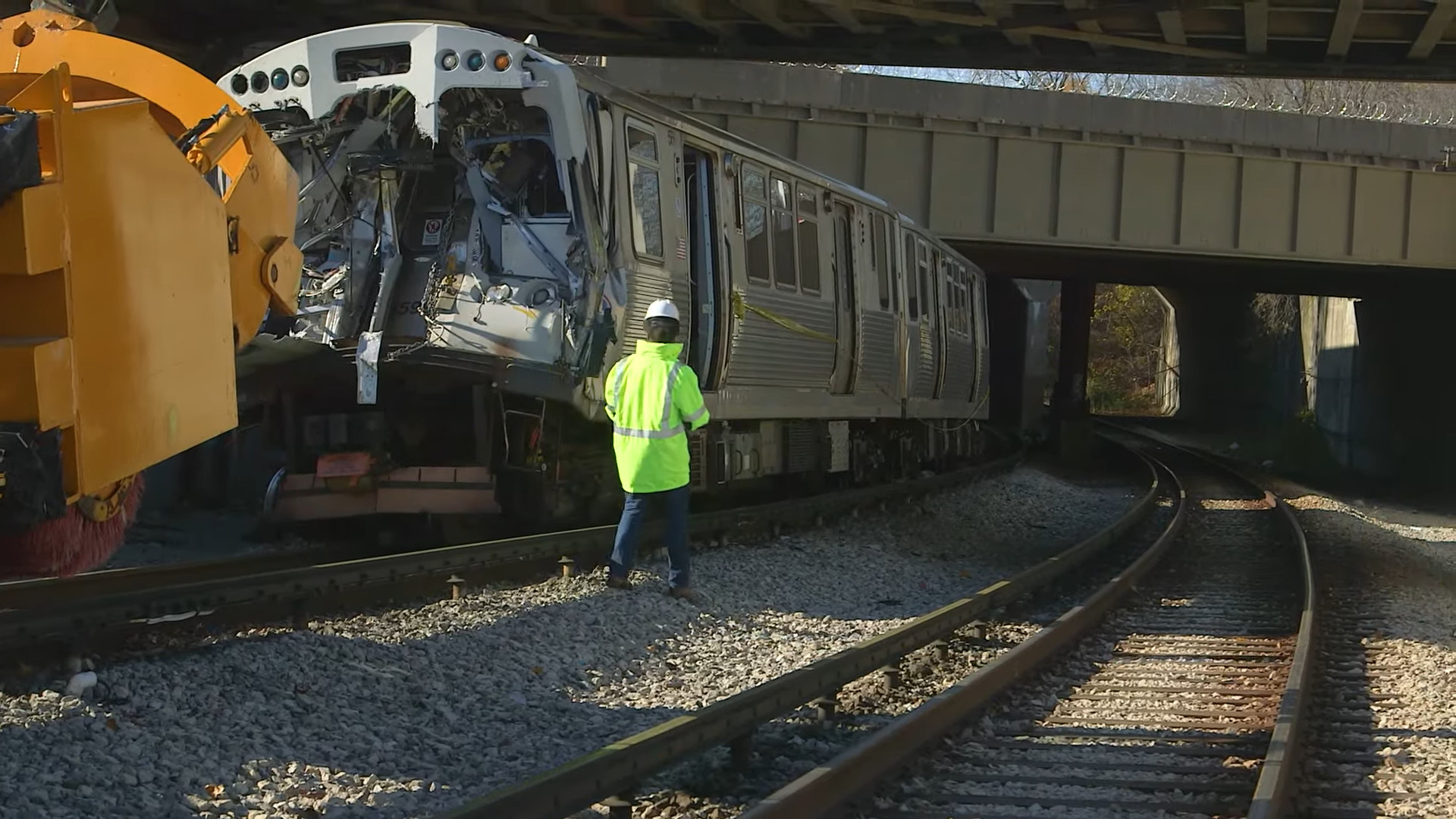
- The front of the crashed train and the yellow snow removal vehicle

Details
- Date: November 16, 2023; 2 years ago 10:39 a.m. CST
- Location: Howard Yard near Howard station
- Country: United States
- Line: CTA Yellow Line
- Operator: Chicago Transit Authority
- Incident type: Collision
- Cause: Wheel slide from aggressive braking and slippery rails

Statistics
- Trains: 1
- Vehicles: 1
- Passengers: 30
- Crew: 7
- Injured: 16
- Damage: $9 million

On November 16, 2023, a Chicago Transit Authority (CTA) passenger train collided with maintenance equipment north of Howard station, injuring 16 people.

== Accident ==
CCTV footage released by Chicago Transit Authority, showing multiple camera views during the crash. The snow removal vehicle appears in the lower shot at the 0:49 mark.

At 10:39 a.m. local time (07:50 UTC) on November 16, 2023, a Yellow Line passenger train, carrying 30 passengers and 1 operator, approaching its terminal at Howard station at 26.9 mph (43.3 km/h) collided with stopped snow-removal equipment, carrying 6 employees, on the southern track. The front car of the two-car train was partially crushed and derailed. Fifteen ambulances responded to the scene. Of the 37 people aboard both vehicles, 16 were injured, 3 of which were in critical condition.

Service on the Yellow Line was discontinued pending an investigation.

== Train ==
Footage from investigators show that the train involved in the accident was one 5000-series pair, cars 5599 and 5600, and the maintenance vehicle was a Niigata Transys-built diesel snow removal vehicle numbered S-500.

== Investigation ==
The following day, the National Transportation Safety Board (NTSB) started an investigation into the crash. Initial news reports suspected the operator to be incapacitated or in error; however, a preliminary announcement from the NTSB indicated that the CTA had underestimated its trains' braking distance, compounded by the effects of slippery rails.

In a preliminary report released on December 12, 2023, the NTSB found that, at the time of the incident, the snow-removal equipment had stopped 370 feet (110 m) north of a red signal. The passenger train operator received a stop command from the signal system when the train was traveling southbound at approximately 54 mph (87 km/h), about 2,150 feet (660 m) behind the snow-removal equipment. The operator engaged the brakes and emergency brakes, and the train decelerated to 26.9 mph (43.3 km/h) before colliding with the stationary equipment.

== Aftermath ==
Following the incident, service on the Yellow Line was fully closed and replaced with bus service, initially announced to be for a period of five days. Following the release of the NTSB's preliminary report, the CTA announced that it would reduce the speed limit on the Yellow Line from 55 mph (89 km/h) to 35 mph (56 km/h), and to 25 mph (40 km/h) in the area where the crash occurred. Yellow Line service resumed on January 5, 2024 and the speed limit was returned to 55 mph (89 km/h) for most of the route on April 20, 2025.

== See also ==
- O'Hare station train crash, a similar incident on the Blue Line where a train overran a bumper and ran up an escalator.
