= Asbury station =

Former Chicago "L" station

ASBURY 1300W 200N

General information
- Location: Asbury Avenue and Brummel Street; Evanston, Illinois
- Coordinates: 42.02205°N 87.69012°W
- Owner: Chicago Transit Authority
- Line: Niles Center branch
- Platforms: 2 side platforms
- Tracks: 2 tracks

Construction
- Structure type: Open cut

History
- Opened: March 28, 1925
- Closed: March 27, 1948

Former services
Preceding station	Chicago "L"	Following station
Dodge toward Dempster	Niles Center branch	Ridge toward Howard
Track layout
Location

Asbury was a station on the Chicago Transit Authority's Niles Center branch, now known as the Yellow Line. The station was located at Asbury Avenue and Brummel Street in Evanston, Illinois. Asbury was situated east of Dodge and west of Ridge. Asbury opened on March 28, 1925, and closed on March 27, 1948, upon the closing of the Niles Center branch.

== Proposed reopening ==
After renewed interest in infill stations on the Yellow Line, a 2007 Skokie Swift/North Shore Corridor Travel Market Analysis evaluated Dodge, Asbury, and Ridge as possible station sites, and found that Asbury had the fewest track-geometry constraints. The study projected that a restored station could attract up to 1,000 riders per day, and in April 2012 the Evanston City Council approved Asbury Avenue as the location for a new CTA Yellow Line station.
