= Crawford–East Prairie station =

Former CTA station

CRAWFORD-EAST PRAIRIE 4000W 7800N
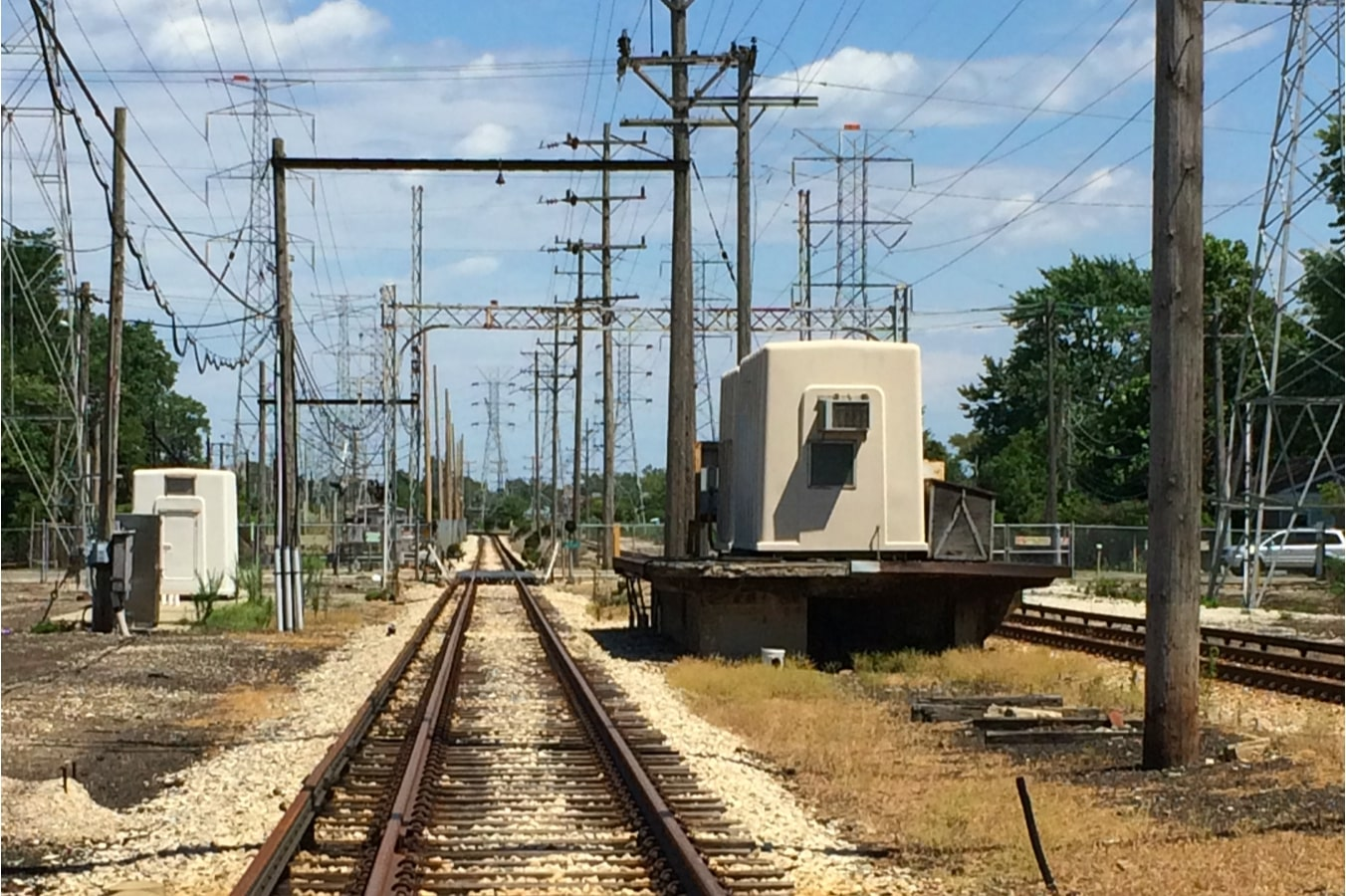
- A portion of the station's platform in 2015

General information
- Location: Mulford Street between Crawford Avenue and East Prairie Avenue; Skokie, Illinois
- Coordinates: 42.02242°N 87.72827°W
- Owner: Chicago Transit Authority
- Line: Niles Center branch
- Platforms: 1 island platform
- Tracks: 2 tracks

Construction
- Structure type: At-grade

History
- Opened: March 28, 1925
- Closed: March 27, 1948

Former services
Preceding station	Chicago "L"	Following station
Kostner toward Dempster	Niles Center branch	Dodge toward Howard
Track layout
Location

Crawford–East Prairie was a station on the Chicago Transit Authority's Niles Center branch, now known as the Yellow Line. The station was located at Mulford Street between Crawford Avenue and East Prairie Road in Skokie, Illinois. Crawford–East Prairie was situated east of Kostner and west of Dodge. Crawford–East Prairie opened on March 28, 1925, and closed on March 27, 1948, upon the closing of the Niles Center branch.
