= Dodge station =

Former CTA station

DODGE 1900W 200N
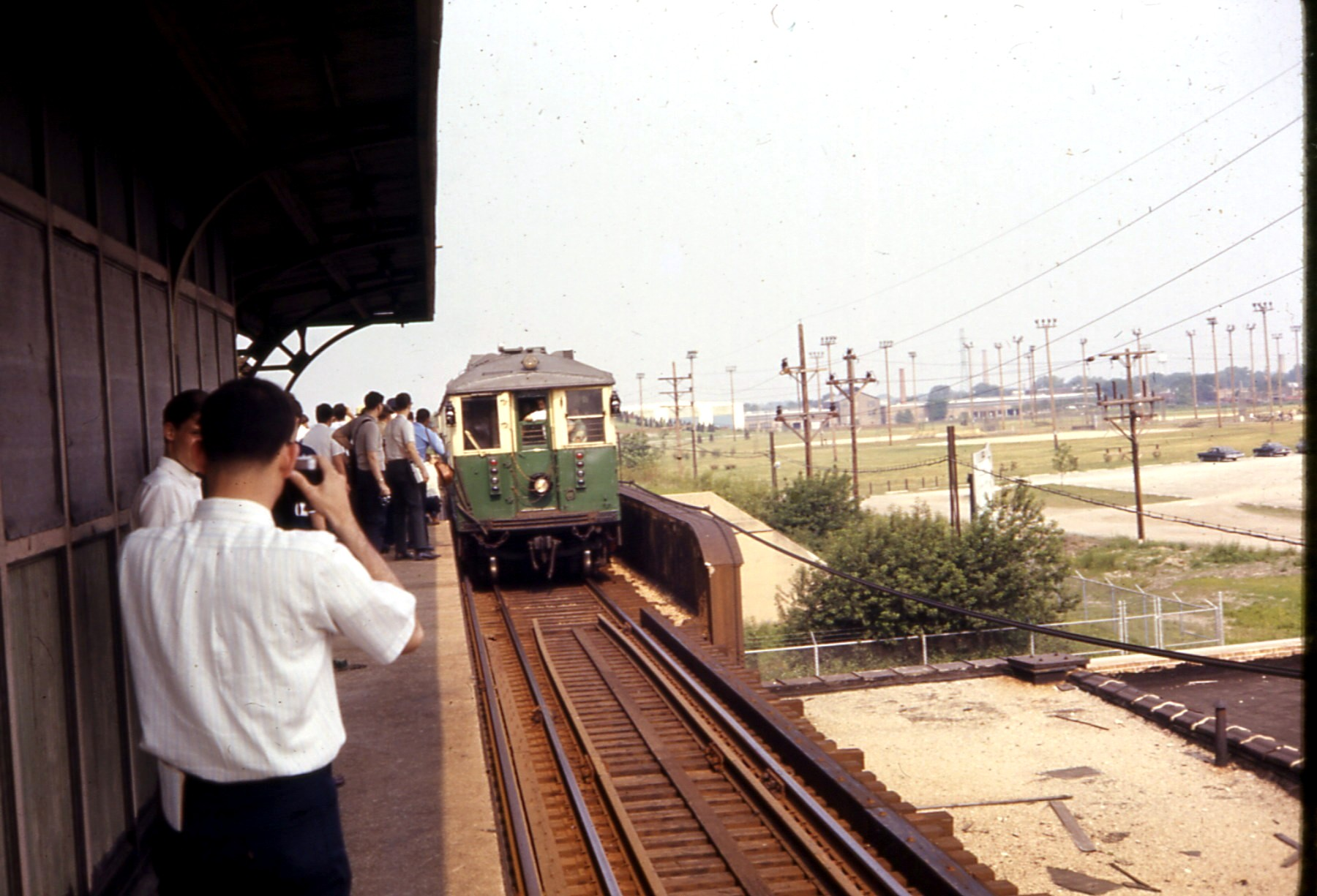
- Dodge station in 1968 being used for a fantrip

General information
- Location: Dodge Avenue and Mulford Street; Evanston, Illinois
- Coordinates: 42.02255°N 87.69952°W
- Owner: Chicago Transit Authority
- Line: Niles Center branch
- Platforms: 1 island platform
- Tracks: 2 tracks

Construction
- Structure type: Elevated

History
- Opened: March 28, 1925
- Closed: March 27, 1948

Former services
Preceding station	Chicago "L"	Following station
Crawford–East Prairie toward Dempster	Niles Center branch	Asbury toward Howard
Location

Dodge was a station on the Chicago Transit Authority's Niles Center branch, now known as the Yellow Line. The station was located at Dodge Avenue and Mulford Street in Evanston, Illinois. Dodge was situated east of Crawford-East Prairie and west of Asbury. Dodge opened on March 28, 1925, and closed on March 27, 1948, upon the closing of the Niles Center branch.

== Later proposals ==
The former Dodge site was later evaluated as one of three possible south Evanston locations for a new Yellow Line station in a regional/city study. In 2012, an Evanston advisory committee recommended Asbury over Dodge for the station location.
