= Kostner station (CTA Niles Center branch) =

KOSTNER 4400W 7800N
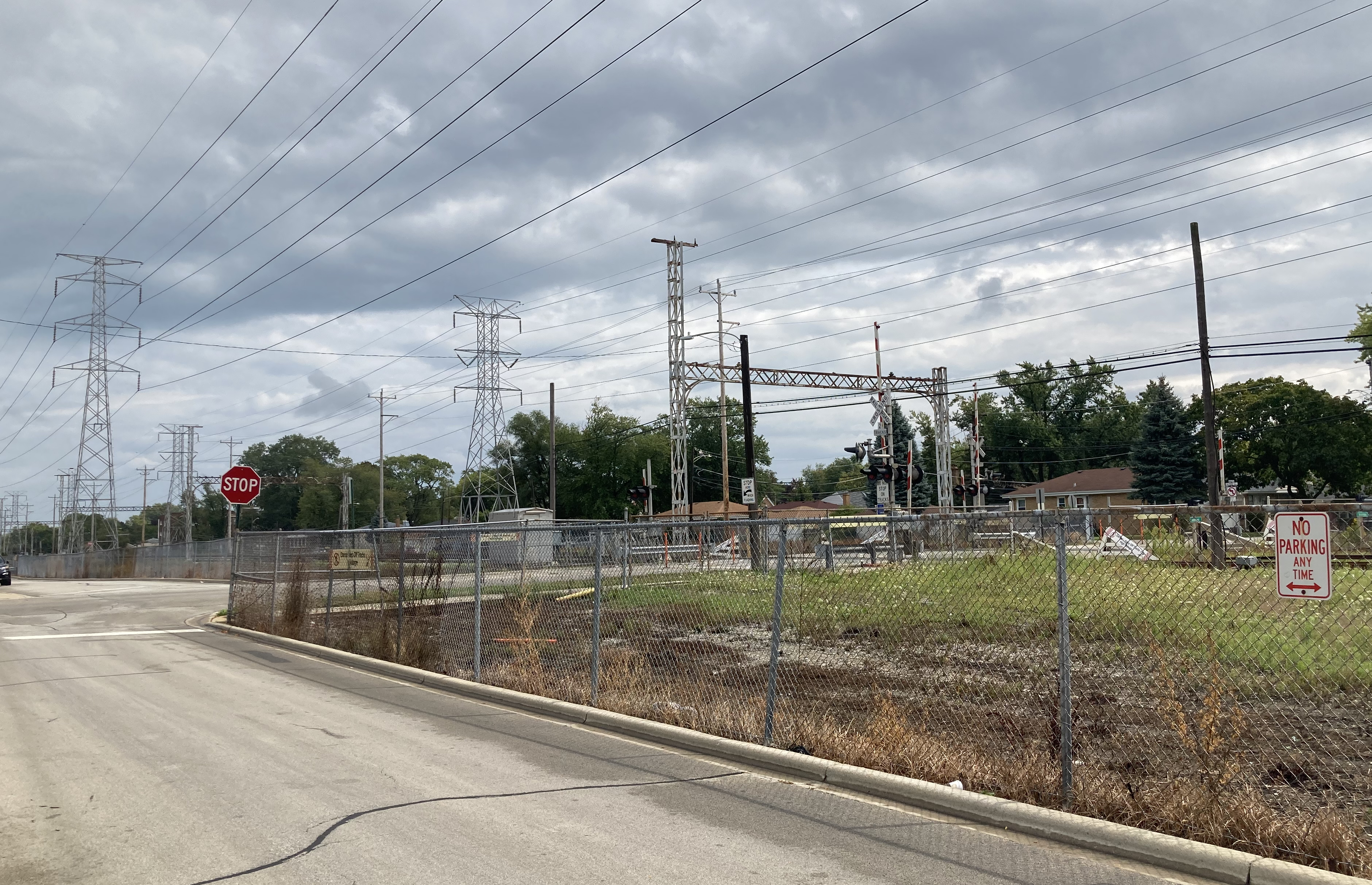
- Site of the demolished station in September 2023

General information
- Location: Kostner Avenue and Mulford Street; Skokie, Illinois
- Coordinates: 42.02235°N 87.73797°W
- Owner: Chicago Transit Authority
- Line: Niles Center branch
- Platforms: 1 island platform
- Tracks: 2 tracks

Construction
- Structure type: At-grade

History
- Opened: March 28, 1925
- Closed: March 27, 1948
- Former names: Schreiber Road

Former services
Preceding station	Chicago "L"	Following station
Oakton toward Dempster	Niles Center branch	Crawford–East Prairie toward Howard
Track layout
Location

Kostner was a station on the Chicago Transit Authority's Niles Center branch, now known as the Yellow Line. The station was located at Kostner Avenue and Mulford Street in Skokie, Illinois. Kostner was situated east of Oakton and west of Crawford-East Prairie. Kostner opened on March 28, 1925, and closed on March 27, 1948, upon the closing of the Niles Center branch. The station was originally known as Schreiber Road.
