= Dempster Street Station =

Dempster Street station could refer to:

- Dempster–Skokie station, a rapid transit station in Skokie, Illinois
- Dempster station, a rapid transit station in Evanston, Illinois
- Dempster Street station (C&NW), a former Chicago and North Western Railway station in Evanston, Illinois
