= Kostner station =

Kostner station could refer to three current or former Chicago "L" stations:

- Kostner station (CTA Pink Line), still in use
- Kostner station (CTA Congress Line), closed 1973
- Kostner station (CTA Niles Center Line), closed 1948
