= Oakton–Skokie station =

Chicago "L" station

Oakton-Skokie 8000N 4800W
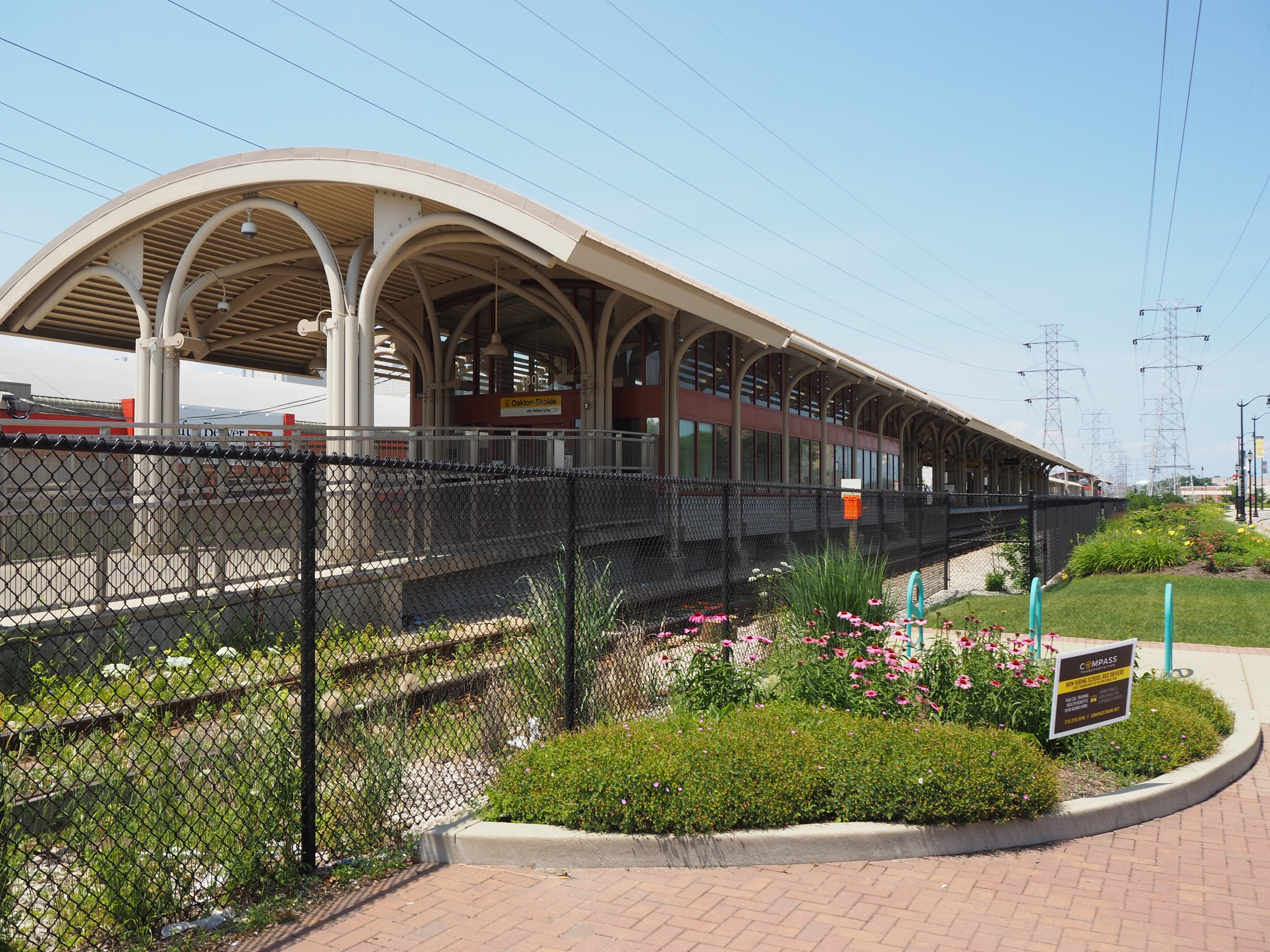
- Station entrance at Oakton Street

General information
- Location: 4800 Oakton Street; Skokie, Illinois 60076
- Coordinates: 42.0273°N 87.7476°W
- Owner: Village of Skokie
- Line: Skokie Swift
- Platforms: 1 island platform
- Tracks: 2 tracks
- Connections: CTA and Pace buses

Construction
- Structure type: At-grade
- Cycle facilities: Yes
- Accessible: Yes

History
- Opened: March 28, 1925
- Closed: March 27, 1948 – April 30, 2012
- Rebuilt: 2010–2012
- Former names: Oakton

Passengers
- 2025: 146,112 ▲8.2%

Services
Preceding station	Chicago "L"	Following station
Dempster–Skokie Terminus	Yellow Line	Howard Terminus
Former services
Preceding station	Chicago "L"	Following station
Main Closed 1948 toward Dempster	Niles Center branch	Kostner Closed 1948 toward Howard
Track layout
Location

Oakton–Skokie is an 'L' station on the CTA's Yellow Line, which serves downtown Skokie. Previously, a station existed at this location which was in operation as part of the North Shore Line's Niles Center Route from 1925 until 1948, and later demolished in 1964. The current station opened on April 30, 2012.

== History ==
In the 1920s, both the Chicago Rapid Transit Company and the North Shore Line (an interurban railroad linking Chicago and Milwaukee) existed under the private ownership of Samuel Insull. The North Shore Line's original route to Milwaukee ran through numerous North Shore communities that had become densely settled. In order to provide faster service between Chicago and Milwaukee, the North Shore Line decided to build a high-speed bypass several miles west of its original line. The new route would traverse the Skokie Valley and converge with the 'L' at Howard. In an attempt to encourage development in the village of Niles Center on the southern portion of the line, the Chicago Rapid Transit Company would operate rapid transit service as far as Dempster Street.

The new "Niles Center Route" included several intermediate stations served only by the Chicago Rapid Transit Company, including one at Oakton Street, just a few blocks from the intersection of Lincoln Avenue and Oakton Street where the business district of Niles Center was forming. Arthur U. Gerber, staff architect for Samuel Insull, designed the station in the Prairie School style, similar to the Dempster station at the end of the line. The station at Oakton was smaller and set between the tracks, with a single high-level island platform projecting from the rear of the station house.

The line entered operation on March 28, 1925, but did not encourage much development before the Great Depression and World War II, put a halt to building activity for 20 years. The Niles Center service remained unprofitable in 1947 when the privately owned Chicago Rapid Transit Company was subsumed into the public Chicago Transit Authority, and on March 27, 1948, rapid transit service was terminated and replaced by the 97 Skokie bus route. All rapid transit stations along the line were closed, except for Dempster where North Shore Line service continued until the company went out of business in 1963.

On Monday, April 20, 1964, the Chicago Transit Authority reinstated service on the Niles Center Branch as a nonstop shuttle between Howard and Dempster, dubbed the Skokie Swift. No station was located at Oakton, even though it is only one block from Skokie's central business district.

=== Reconstruction ===
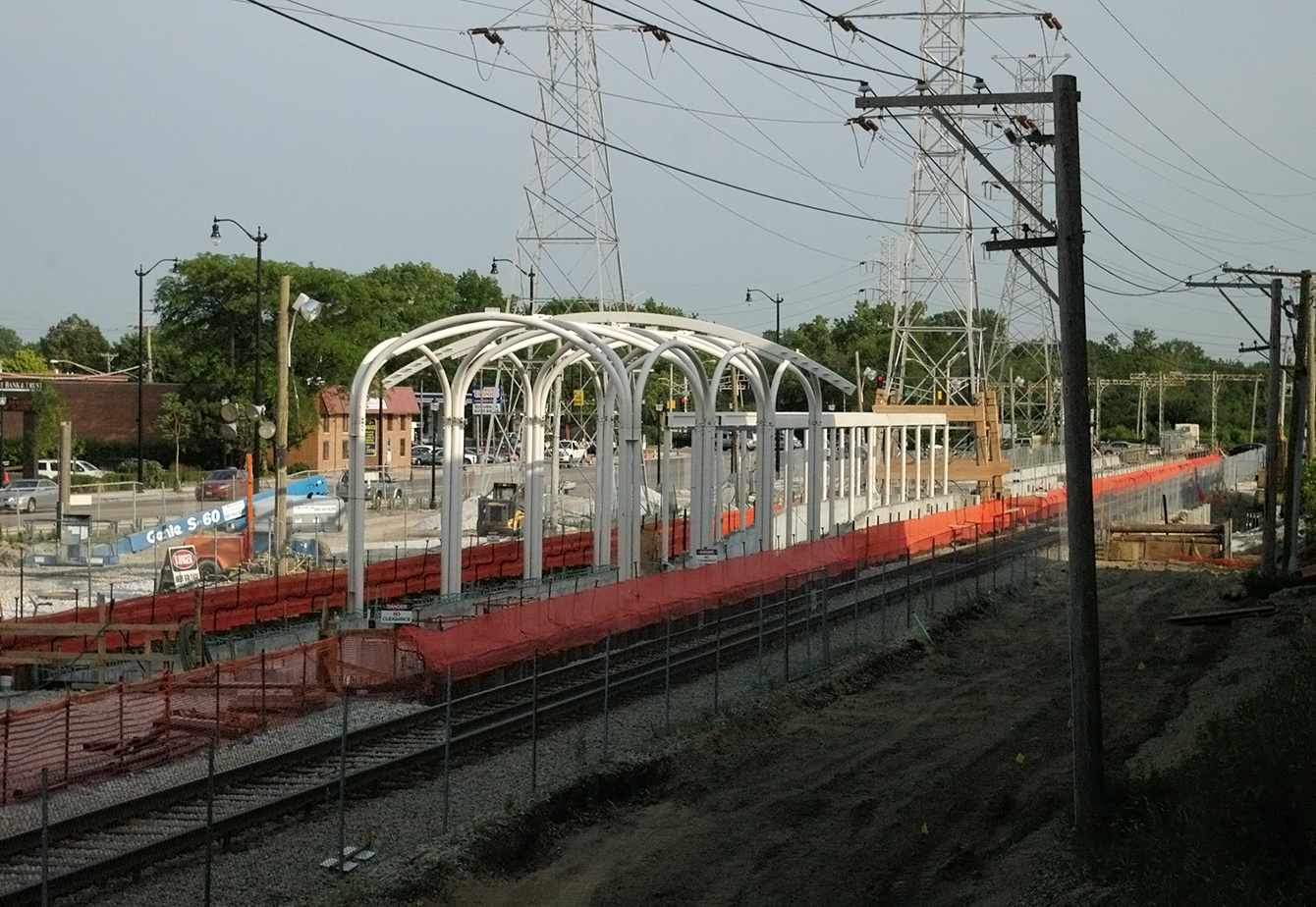
During reconstruction

Since the Swift began operating in 1964, there had been interest on the part of the Village of Skokie and its citizens to reestablish at least one of the local stations. The most likely candidate to return was Oakton because of its location near Skokie's downtown and its potential to generate the most traffic. A study commissioned by the Village of Skokie and completed in Fall 2003 recommended establishing a stop at Oakton. Village officials discussed and planned for a downtown Skokie Swift station for more than five years. More recently, a developer purchased the 28-acre (110,000 m^{2}) Pfizer Pharmaceuticals property adjacent to the station site to build a life sciences research park, now Illinois Science + Technology Park. The employees at the research park would drive ridership at the station. The CTA has supported plans for the Oakton station, as indicated in a 2003 letter from then CTA President Frank Kruesi: "By... providing infill stations (along the Yellow Line), the CTA will make better use of existing service capacity and provide expanded reverse commute opportunities."

=== Style and design ===
In early 2005, the village received $417,000 in a federal grant earmarked for the station's design, which covers about 80 percent of design costs for the station. The village would pick up the remainder, about $104,000, according to Village Director of Engineering Fred Schattner. Then, in mid-2005, village staff submitted a grant proposal to the federal Congestion Mitigation and Air Quality grant program, which provides funds for projects that contribute to traffic congestion relief and cleaner air quality. In late November 2005, Skokie secured a $1 million federal grant for the village's downtown Skokie Swift project with the help of U.S. Rep. Jan Schakowsky, D-9th. Then, in early December 2005, Skokie learned they would receive an additional $9.2 million in federal grant funds to construct the station. The entire project is estimated to cost about $15 million including any land acquisition needed, which means the village had by this time secured more than two-thirds of the funding. Skokie Mayor Van Dusen had said he was exploring options to help pay for some or all of the remaining cost.

== Location ==
The station is located on the site of the original station, just west of Skokie Boulevard, north of Oakton Street and adjacent to the new Illinois Science + Technology Park. The village sought proposals from firms for design work for the new station, eventually awarding the contract to McDonough Associates. Construction of the new downtown station was expected to begin in 2007 and officials estimated the station would be completed in 2007 or 2008. Issues of financing delayed the project as various funding sources were secured, and later issues of land acquisition delayed the project further. Finally in 2007, after extensive deliberation, the Village of Skokie initiated eminent domain proceedings against two landowners (an auto repair shop and a truck rental business) to make room adjacent to the station for a "kiss and ride" area, a bus turnaround and a taxi drop-off area.

A groundbreaking ceremony took place at the adjacent Illinois Science + Technology Park on June 21, 2010. On June 8, 2011, the Chicago Transit Board announced that the name of the station would be Oakton–Skokie. Naming of the station was done concurrently with the renaming of the Dempster–Skokie Yellow Line station and terminus., The Skokie Valley Trail runs west of the station.

== Facilities ==
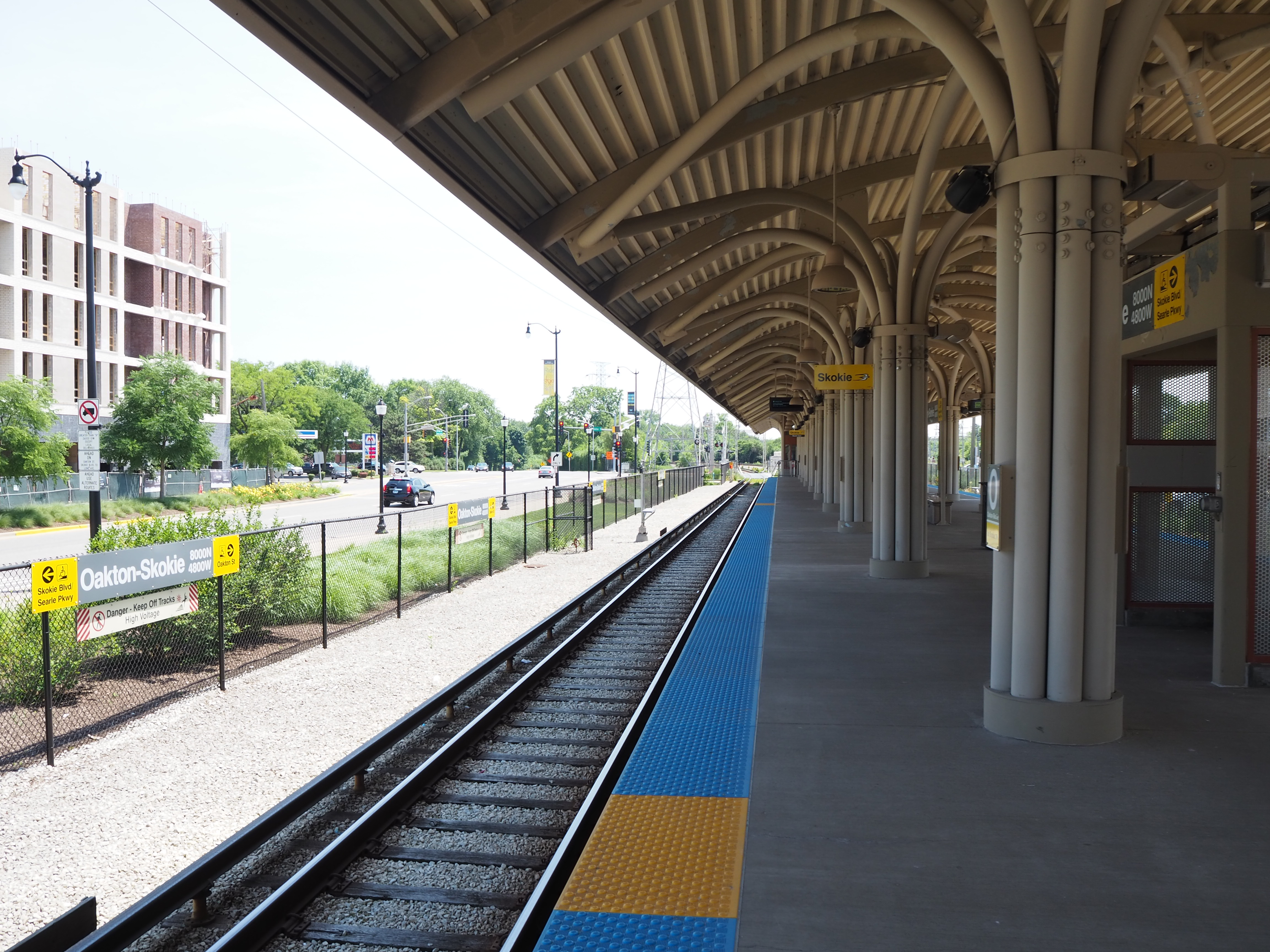
Station platform, looking south

The station consists of an island platform at grade level located between the Yellow Line's two tracks; the eastern track serves trains to Dempster–Skokie, while the western track serves trains to Howard. Oakton–Skokie has two entrances: one located off of Oakton Street and the other off Skokie Boulevard near Searle Parkway.

== Ridership ==
The original Oakton station had 63,638 riders in 1925, being the third-most patronized station on the Niles Center Branch after Dempster and Ridge. However, this quickly dropped to 12,445 riders in 1926. Station agents were discontinued at Oakton in 1927, by which time it had achieved 759 riders in the year, meaning that station-specific ridership information was no longer available and passengers gave their fare to on-train conductors instead. This was a trend across the Niles Center branch, such that by the end of 1931 Dempster and Howard were the only two stations on it that still had station agents. In any event, the branch's total ridership peaked at 733,603 passengers in 1930, although it consistently served more than half a million passengers a year until its closure.

== Bus connections ==
CTA

- 54A North Cicero/Skokie Blvd (weekday rush hours only)
- 97 Skokie

Pace

- 210 Lincoln Avenue (weekdays only)

== Works cited ==
- CTA Rail Entrance, Annual Traffic, 1900–1979 (Report). Chicago: Chicago Transit Authority. October 1, 1979.
