= Main station (CTA Niles Center branch) =

Former Chicago 'L' station

MAIN 4900W 8400N
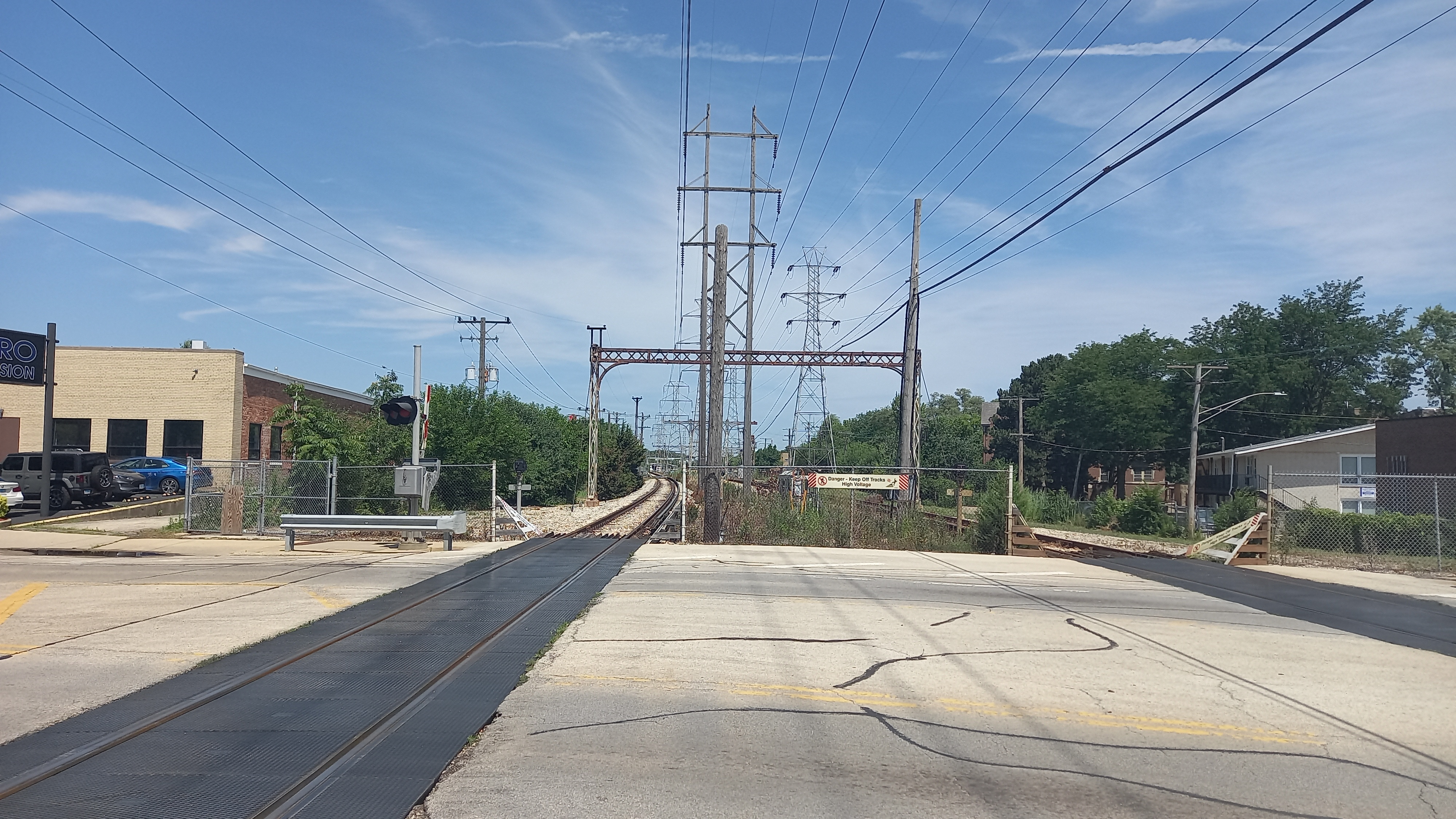
- Location of the demolished station, July 2023

General information
- Location: Main Street and Niles Center Road; Skokie, Illinois
- Coordinates: 42.03354°N 87.74960°W
- Owner: Chicago Transit Authority
- Line: Niles Center branch
- Platforms: 1 island platform
- Tracks: 2 tracks

Construction
- Structure type: At-grade

History
- Opened: March 28, 1925
- Closed: March 27, 1948

Former services
Preceding station	Chicago "L"	Following station
Dempster Terminus	Niles Center branch	Oakton toward Howard
Track layout
Location

Main was a station on the Chicago Transit Authority's Niles Center branch, now known as the Yellow Line. The station was located at Main Street and Niles Center Road in Skokie, Illinois. Main was situated south of Dempster and north of Oakton. Main opened on March 28, 1925, and closed on March 27, 1948, upon the closing of the Niles Center branch.
