= Sauganash Historic District =

Historic district in Illinois, United States

- U.S. National Register of Historic Places
- U.S. Historic district
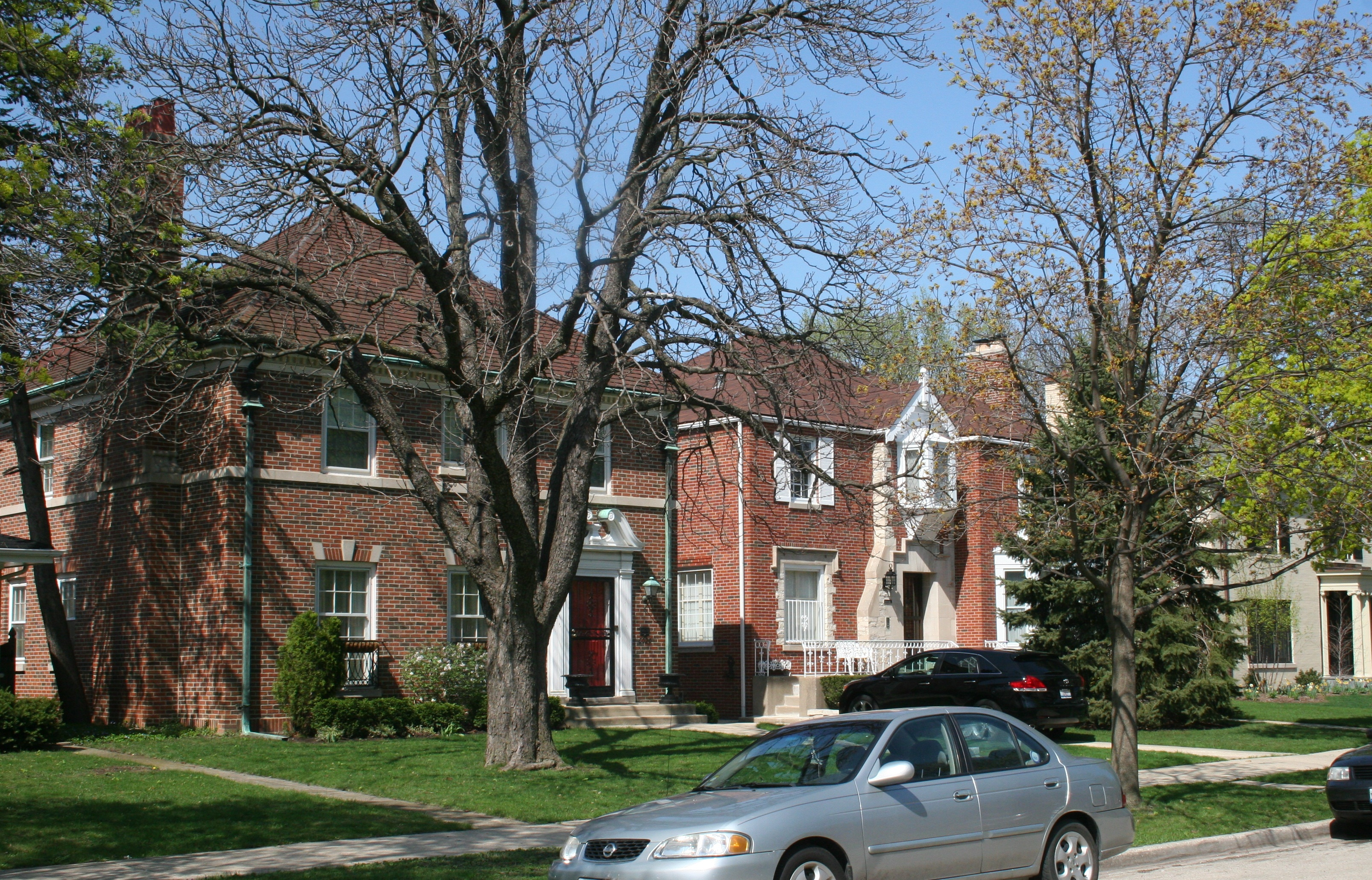
- Forest Glen Avenue north from Hiawatha Avenue

- Location within Illinois
- Location: Roughly bounded by Lemont and Keating Aves, Chicago and Northwestern Railway, and the alley to the east of Kilbourn Ave, North Side, Chicago, Illinois
- Coordinates: 41°59′24″N 87°44′33″W
- Area: 160 acres (65 ha)
- NRHP reference No.: 10000310
- Added to NRHP: June 7, 2010

The Sauganash Historic District is a historic district which includes the Sauganash Park development, in the Forest Glen, Chicago neighborhood of North Side, Chicago, Illinois.

== Description ==
It is roughly bounded by Lemont and Keating Avenues, the Chicago and Northwestern Railway tracks, and the alley to the east of Kilbourn Avenue. The Skokie Valley Trail southern terminus is in this area.

The NRHP historic district includes 468 contributing structures and 141 non-contributing ones.

The Old Treaty Elm, said to be the site where the Indian Treaty of 1835 was signed, stood near the southernmost point of the District until 1933. A commemorative plaque now marks the site.

== History ==
Between 1840 and 1880 Chicago's population multiplied 126 times over. As hundreds of thousands of people flocked to the city, they encountered congested streets, crowded tenements, and unsanitary living conditions. However, by the turn of 20th century, reliable and affordable transportation to and from the city center allowed for working individuals to commute from suburban developments, such as the Sauganash Historic District. Built between 1912 and 1950, Sauganash was conceived by its developers, Koester and Zander, as a haven for middle-class families fleeing the crowded city center. The neighborhood, with its streetscapes, specific housing types, and carefully designed public spaces, was developed as a distinct community, the design and style of which continues to set Sauganash apart from the rest of the city.

The district was listed on the U.S. National Register of Historic Places on June 7, 2010. The listing was announced as the featured listing in the National Park Service's weekly list of June 18, 2010.

== See also ==
- National Register of Historic Places listings in North Side Chicago
