= Skokie Valley Trail =

Shared-use path in Chicago, Illinois, US

Coordinates: 41.88275°N 87.61433°W

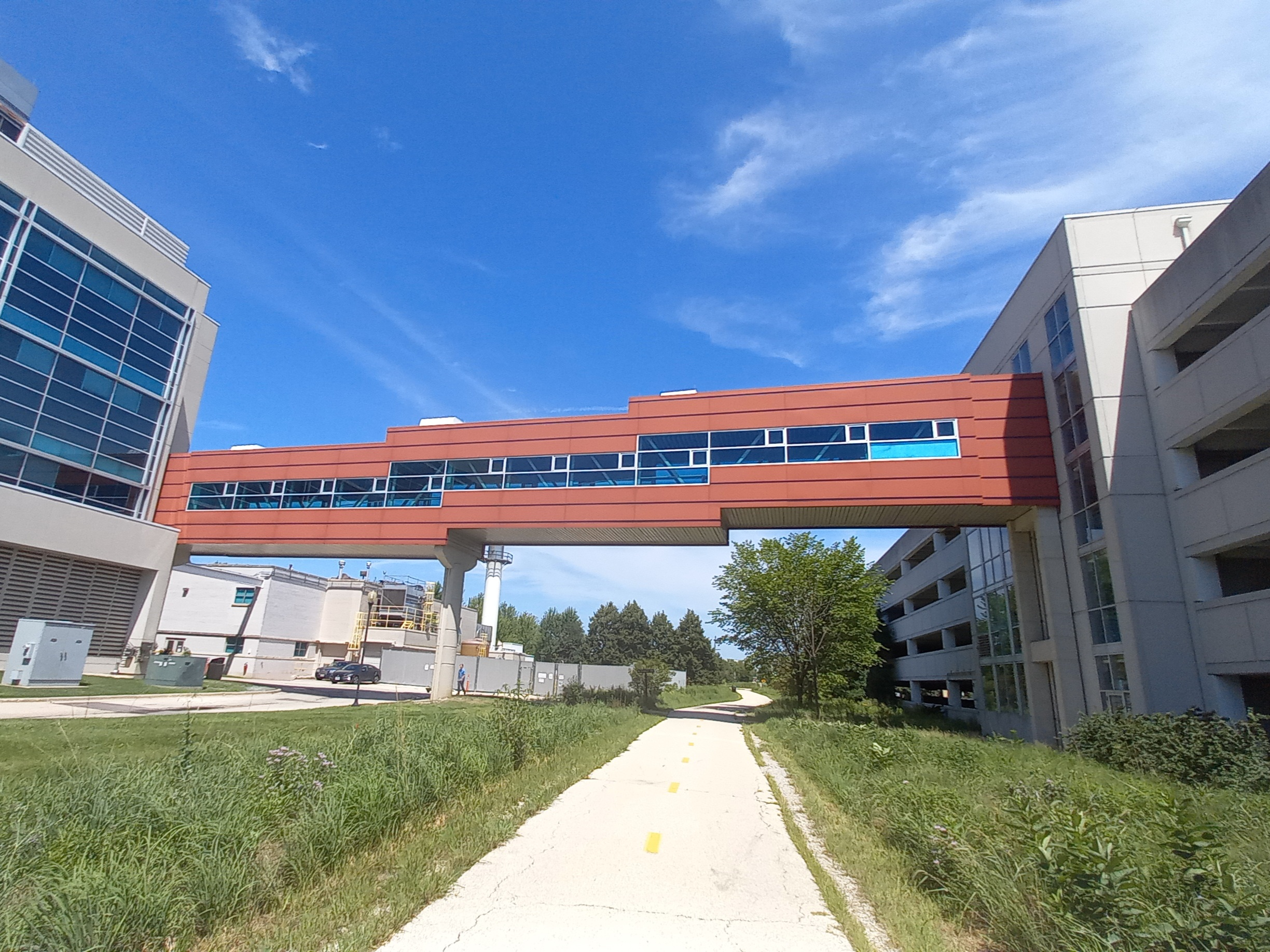
- Skokie Valley Trail in between the LanzaTech building and a parking garage
- Length: 25 miles (40 km)
- Location: Chicago, Illinois US
- Trailheads: Dempster-Skokie Station, Oakton-Skokie Station, Lincolnwood, Lake Forest, Illinois, Northbrook, Illinois, Highland Park, Illinois
- Use: Cycling, skateboarding, personal transporter, and pedestrians
- Difficulty: Easy
- Season: Limited access during winter

Trail map
- Northern Branch Southern Branch

The Skokie Valley Trail is a rail-trail that is a total of 25-mile-long (40 km). It's a partial shared-use path for walking, jogging, skateboarding, and cycling.

The trail currently has two sections, the first is the north branch of the trail, which starts at Rockland Road in Lake Bluff and extends south to Lake Cook Road in Northbrook. The southern portion of Skokie Valley Trail begins at Dempster-Skokie CTA Station and extends to Chicago city limits at Sauganash. It is a dedicated-use path, although frequent intersections do pose a threat to path users. These intersections are clearly signed both to path users and motorists. The long-term goal is to join these two sections. The trail passes through the old Chicago North Shore and Milwaukee Railroad right-of-way. It also serves as a route for bicycle, skateboard and personal transporter commuters.

== History ==
=== South Segment ===
The south segment of the trail runs along the abandoned Union Pacific (formerly Chicago and North Western Railway) right-of-way from Bryn Mawr Avenue in Chicago north to Dempster Street in Skokie. A detailed abandonment petition for the last operating segment of the line south of Dempster Street was filed with the Surface Transportation Board (STB) in May 2002.

=== North Segment ===
To the north of Lake Cook Road, the trail runs on the right-of-way once owned by the storied Chicago North Shore and Milwaukee Railroad, abandoned in 1963.

=== Proposed Middle Segment ===
Efforts to extend the trail must balance with other users of the corridor, such as high-voltage electrical transmission as well as rail infrastructure. Between Dempster Street and Lake Cook Road, Union Pacific maintains control over an approximately 8.06 mile railroad segment that was granted a discontinuance by the United States Surface Transportation Board. This is a contiguous right-of-way from the south side of Dempster Street in Skokie [adjacent to the terminal of the CTA Yellow Line] extending to the Union Pacific subdivision north of Lake Cook Road. Discontinued lines remain subject to the jurisdiction of the Surface Transportation Board and may readily return to service by petition. As a railroad in the national rail network, a return to service must remain viable. Additionally, since it is a railroad, any new grade crossings must be registered and approved by the owner and any applicable authorities, even if the crossing gates and signals will not be built until or unless rail service returns.

One section was completed between Golf Road and Old Orchard Road using a path a few dozen meters to the west of the Union Pacific railroad, running approximately over the right-of-way long abandoned by Union Pacific's predecessor Chicago and North Western.

== Recent Trail Improvements and Extensions ==
In 2016, Lincolnwood completed new segments of the Valley Trail which created a continuous trail south to LaBaugh Woods.

In 2023, the Skokie Village announced plans to extend the Valley Line Trail from its current terminus at Dempster-Skokie Station to its northernmost village boundary at Old Orchard Road by the Old Orchard Mall. The result will be a continuous trail from the City of Chicago to the northern suburbs beyond Skokie via the North Branch Trail. The project is estimated to be completed by 2025. In late 2023, the village of Skokie received a grant to complete land acquisition towards the project.

There is an ongoing project in Northfield to connect the two disparate sections.

== See also ==
- Cycling in Chicago
