= Morse station =

Chicago "L" station

Morse 6900N 1400W
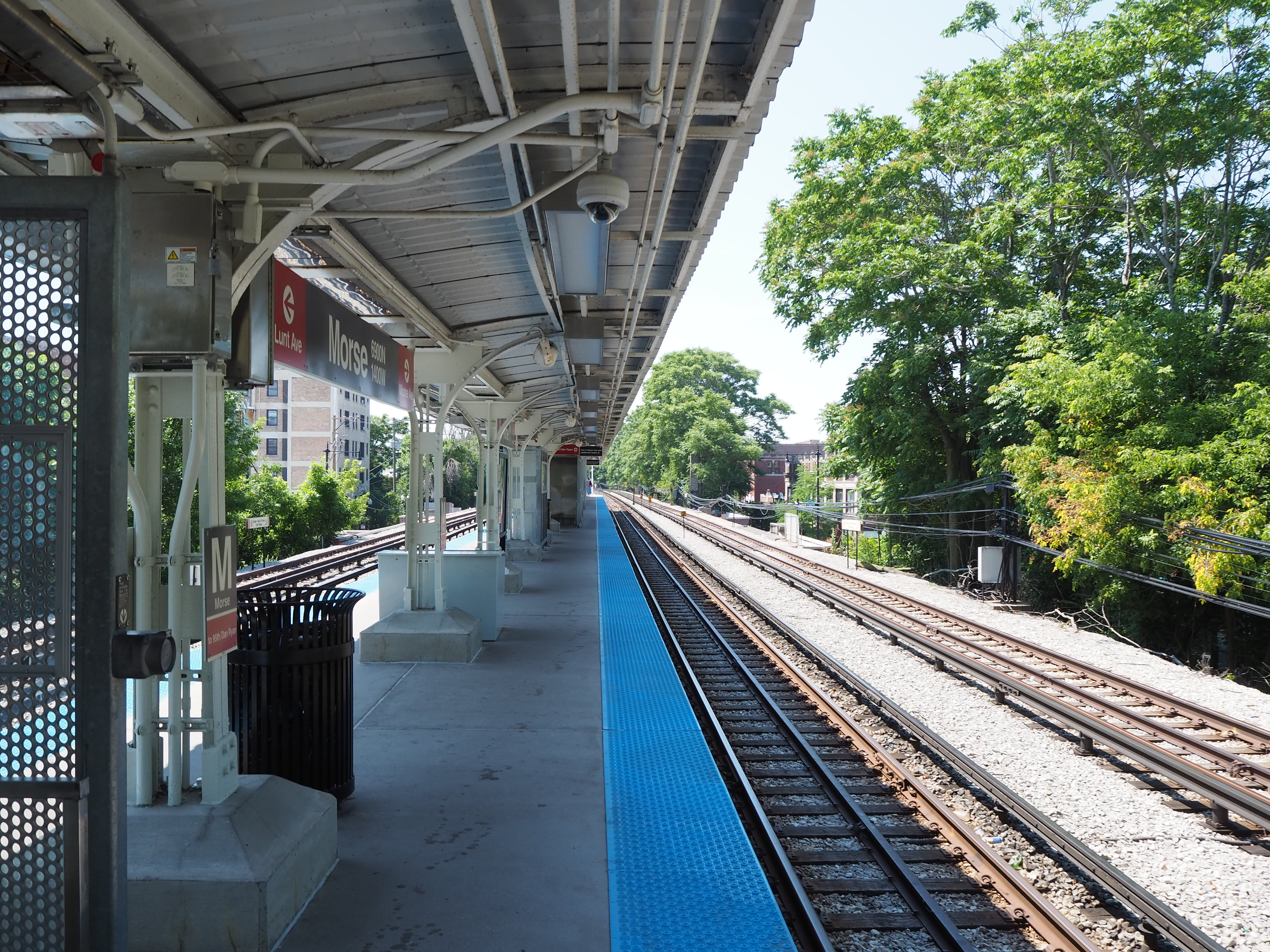

General information
- Location: 1358 West Morse Avenue; Chicago, Illinois 60626
- Coordinates: 42.00819°N 87.66595°W
- Owner: Chicago Transit Authority
- Line: North Side Main Line
- Platforms: 1 island platform
- Tracks: 4

Construction
- Structure type: Embankment
- Parking: Street parking
- Cycle facilities: Yes
- Accessible: No

History
- Opened: May 16, 1908; 118 years ago
- Rebuilt: 1921; 105 years ago, 2012; 14 years ago
- Former names: Rogers Park; Morse-Rogers Park

Passengers
- 2025: 871,372 ▲5.4%

Services
Preceding station	Chicago "L"	Following station
Jarvis toward Howard	Red Line	Loyola toward 95th/Dan Ryan
Purple Line does not stop here
Former services
Preceding station	Milwaukee Road	Following station
Birchwood toward Llewellyn Park	Chicago – Evanston	North Edgewater toward Chicago
Track layout
Location

Morse is an 'L' station on the CTA's Red Line. It is located at 1358 West Morse Avenue in the Rogers Park neighborhood of Chicago, Illinois. The station was formerly known as Rogers Park or Morse-Rogers Park. There is an entrance/exit on West Morse Avenue, featuring multiple turnstiles, an ATM, and fare machines. There is also an unattended entrance/exit with a single turnstile on Lunt Avenue. Purple Line weekday rush hour express service use the outside tracks but do not stop at this station.

== History ==
The station was first constructed in 1908, and was rebuilt in 1921 as the line was elevated. This mostly brick-and-concrete station remains today, although the station was extensively renovated in 2012. The wooden platform was replaced with a new concrete platform, and the interior of the Morse Avenue station house was completely gutted and rebuilt. During this time, the station house was also expanded into an unused adjacent retail space. Shortly after this renovation, an empty storefront adjacent to the Lunt Avenue exit was demolished, and a bicycle parking lot was constructed in its place.

Each year since 2001 the Glenwood Arts Festival has been held on Glenwood Avenue, which includes live music, pop-up art shops, and local food vendors.

=== Stroller controversy ===
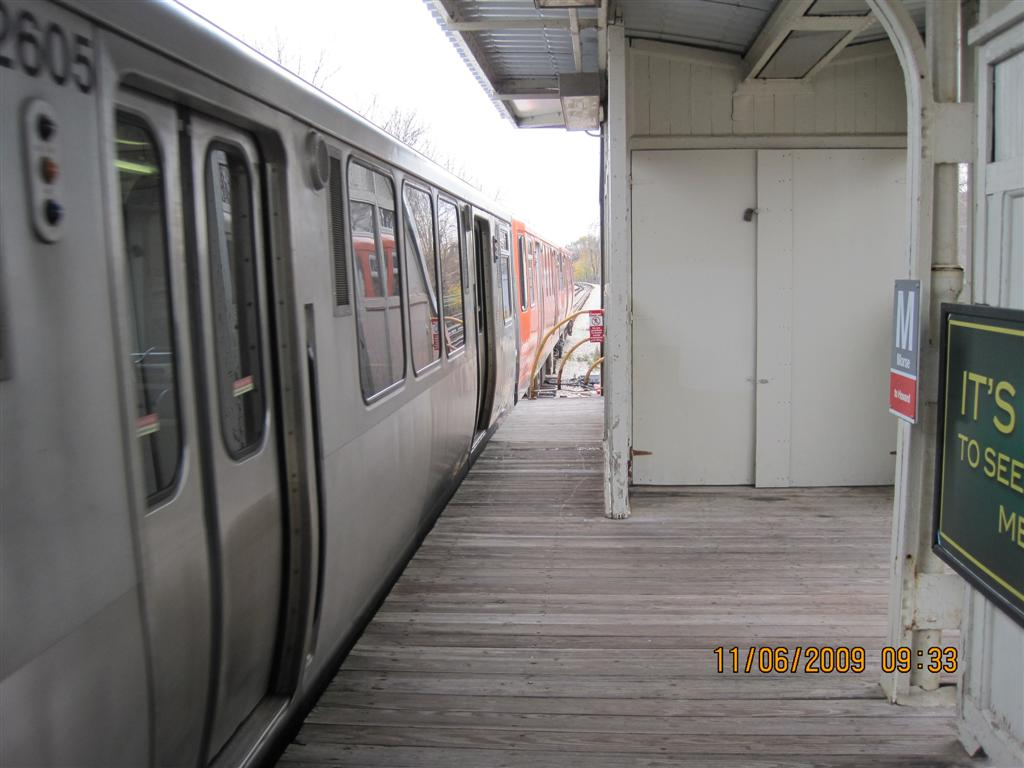
A northbound train enters the station, passing close to the metal guardrail. The stroller is alleged to have struck a similar railing as the train left the station.

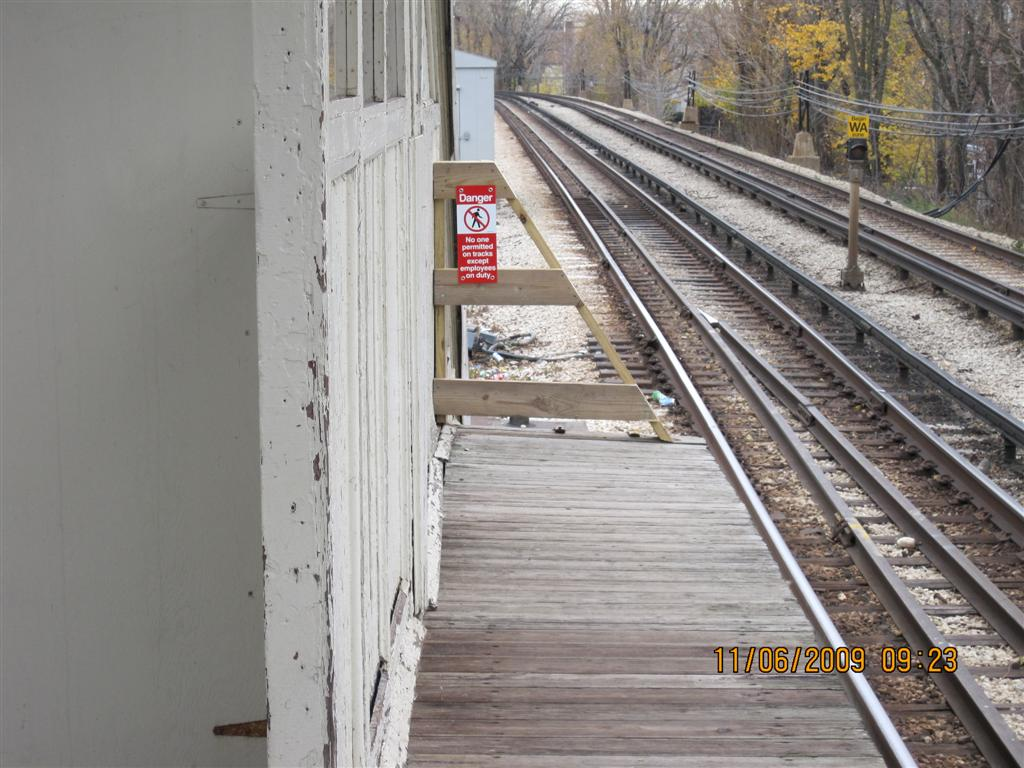
The southbound railing was replaced during the investigation.

On November 2, 2009, an incident occurred at the Morse station involving a child in a stroller; the incident is under some dispute. Ebere Ozonwu claimed that as she was rushing to catch a southbound train, pushing her daughter ahead of her in a stroller, the train's doors closed on the stroller and dragged it, eventually flinging her daughter onto the gravel at the end of the platform and carrying the stroller away. Traces of paint found on the stroller, possibly from the guardrail at the end of the platform, seemed to confirm this story, but the operator claimed that the doors were carefully checked and the train could not have moved if the doors were not closed.

== Location ==
The Morse station is at the heart of the Rogers Park neighborhood on Chicago's North Side. The station is 1/2 mile (0.80 km) east of the Rogers Park Metra commuter railroad station on Lunt Avenue and 1/2 mile (0.80 km) west of Lake Michigan.

Several businesses are housed near the station. Dunkin’ is located in a building underneath the station’s platform.

Over the years, many businesses have claimed the corner of the Morse Red Line, Morse Avenue and Glenwood Avenue as home. Pub 626 occupied the northeast corner of Morse and Glenwood. It closed in 2020 during the Covid-19 pandemic. The family-owned Heartland Cafe was located across the street from the Lunt Avenue entrance/exit at 7000 North Glenwood Avenue for 42 years until December 31, 2018. The building was demolished in May 2019. There are also multiple markets, bodegas, and small corner stores scattered within a half block radius of Morse.

Rogers Park Social moved into a building on Glenwood Avenue in 2014. Malliway Bros. Spells, Charms, & Potions, The Lifeline Theatre, Kimchi Pop, Caribbean Cuts, Rogers Park Provisions, and Le Piano are also located on Glenwood Avenue. Other businesses near the station on Morse include Common Cup, J.B. Alberto’s, Sub Brothers, The Rhapsody Theater, Asian Station, Dingbats Bookshop and Milo’s Pita.

The Morse station is also within walking distance of multiple schools:

- Eugene Field Elementary School
- George B. Armstrong International Studies
- Northside Catholic Academy
- New Field Elementary School
- Chicago Math and Science Academy

Many murals have been painted on the sides of the rail line, on Glenwood Avenue, as well as underneath the tracks on Morse and Lunt Avenue, called the Miles of Murals.

== Bus connections ==
CTA

- 96 Lunt (weekdays only)
- 155 Devon

== Payment ==
Transit Cards were initially used as payment, which riders could refill with money at all transit stops. CTA changed to Ventra Cards on July 1, 2014, as official payment for all transit system.

A one-way trip on the train to any stop, whether it be on the Red Line, or a free transfer to any other conjoined rail line, is $2.50. Transfers within 2 hours are free. Ventra Cards can be purchased at local drugstores, underneath any train station, and through a credit card which can be used as a venture card, immediately taking money out of a passenger's account when it is tapped on the payment pad before getting on the platform.
