= Ridge station =

Transit station in Evanston, Illinois, US

RIDGE 1000W 200N

General information
- Location: Ridge Avenue and Brummel Street; Evanston, Illinois
- Coordinates: 42.02194°N 87.68493°W
- Owner: Chicago Transit Authority
- Line: Niles Center branch
- Platforms: 2 side platforms
- Tracks: 2 tracks

Construction
- Structure type: Open cut

History
- Opened: March 28, 1925
- Closed: March 27, 1948

Former services
Preceding station	Chicago "L"	Following station
Asbury toward Dempster	Niles Center branch	Howard Terminus
Track layout
Location

Ridge was a station on the Chicago Transit Authority's Niles Center branch, now known as the Yellow Line. The station was located at Ridge Avenue and Brummel Street in Evanston, Illinois. Ridge was situated east of Asbury and west of Howard. Ridge opened on March 28, 1925, and closed on March 27, 1948, upon the closing of the Niles Center branch.
