= Jarvis station =

Chicago "L" station

Jarvis 7400N 1600W
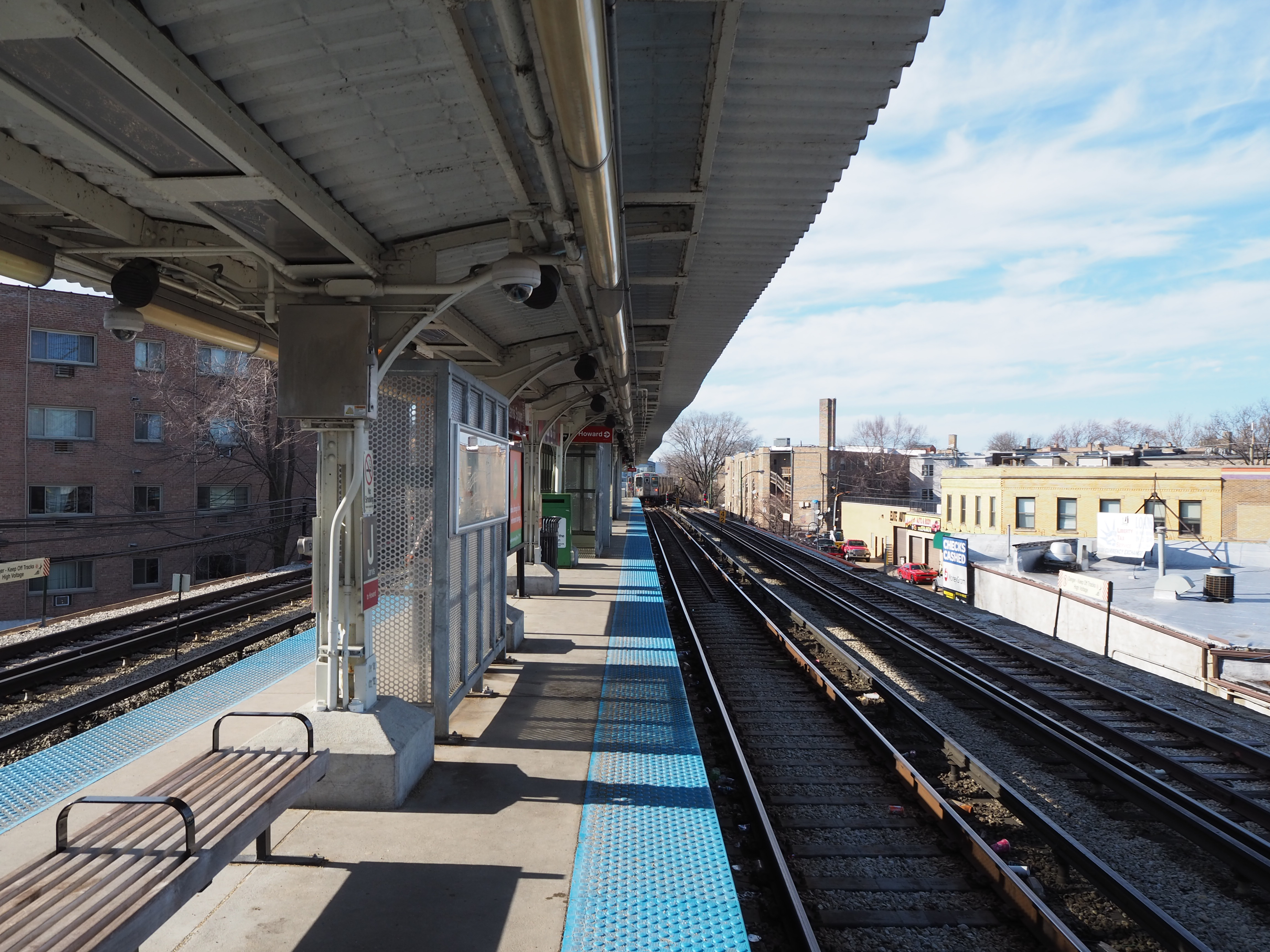

General information
- Location: 1523 West Jarvis Avenue; Chicago, Illinois 60626
- Coordinates: 42.015876°N 87.669092°W
- Owner: Chicago Transit Authority
- Line: North Side Main Line
- Platforms: 1 island platform
- Tracks: 4

Construction
- Structure type: Embankment
- Cycle facilities: Yes
- Accessible: No

History
- Opened: May 16, 1908; 118 years ago
- Rebuilt: 1921, 2012
- Former names: Birchwood

Passengers
- 2025: 349,819 ▲4.2%

Services
Preceding station	Chicago "L"	Following station
Howard Terminus	Red Line	Morse toward 95th/Dan Ryan
Purple Line does not stop here
Former services
Preceding station	Milwaukee Road	Following station
Calvary toward Llewellyn Park	Chicago – Evanston	Rogers Park toward Chicago
Track layout
Location

Jarvis is an 'L' station on the CTA's Red Line, located at 1523 W. Jarvis Avenue in the Rogers Park neighborhood of Chicago, Illinois.

The style of the station is typical for the intermediate Red Line stops between Howard and Wilson – a narrow platform in the middle of the tracks, with the Red Line stopping on the inner tracks, and the Purple Line Express running on the outside tracks during weekday rush hours.

== Closure for modernization project ==
The closure of the Jarvis CTA station (along with Lawrence, and Thorndale on the Red Line and South Boulevard and Foster on the Purple Line) was proposed in three of the CTA's six potential options for the renovation of the Purple Line and northern section of the Red Line in 2011. Under these plans that were never implemented, the station would have been replaced by a new auxiliary entrance to Howard at Rogers Avenue.
