= Loyola station =

Chicago "L" station

Loyola 6550N 1200W
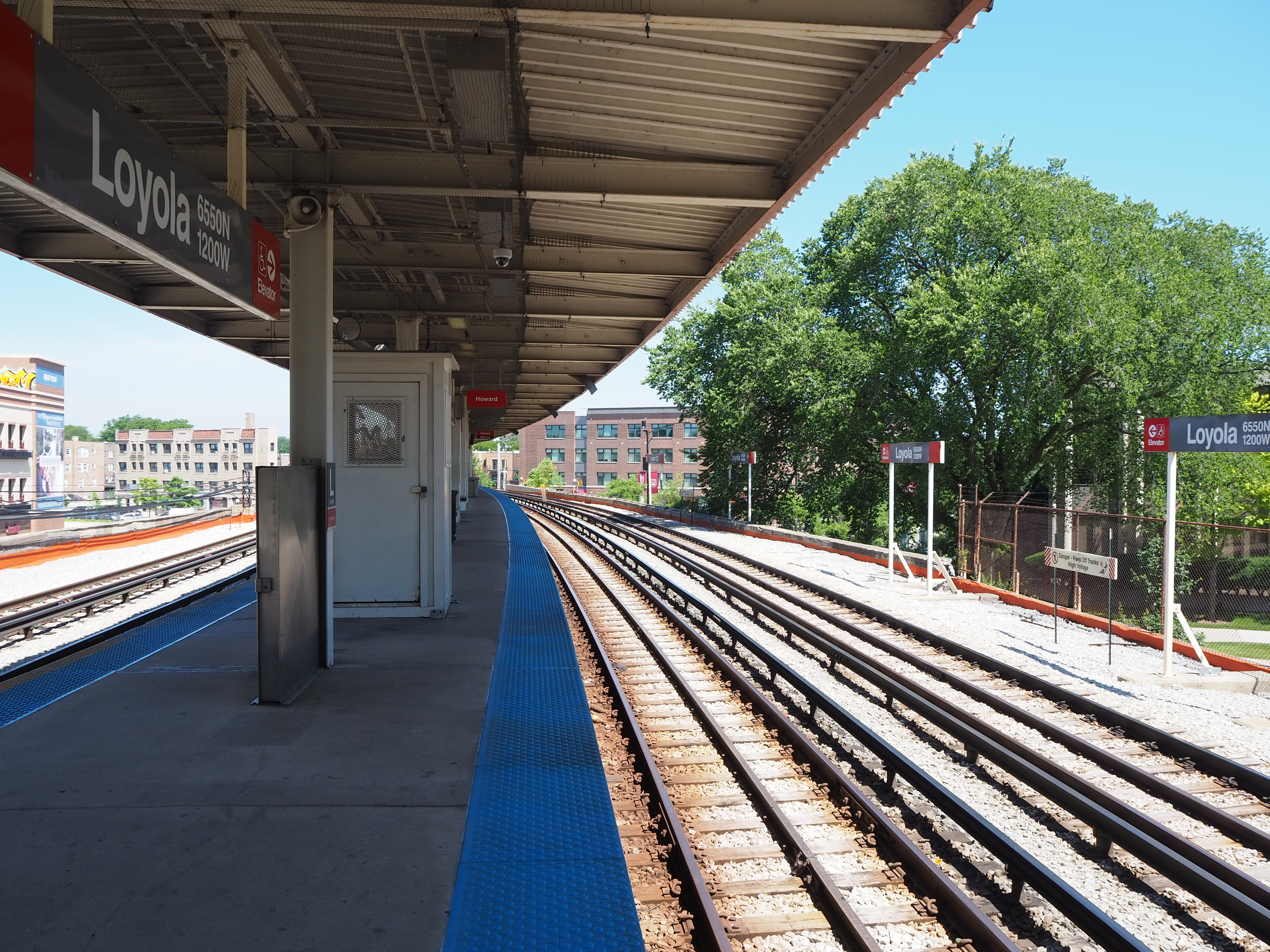
- Northbound section of the platform

General information
- Location: 1200 West Loyola Avenue; Chicago, Illinois 60626
- Coordinates: 42.001076°N 87.660974°W
- Owner: Chicago Transit Authority
- Line: North Side main line
- Platforms: 1 island platform
- Tracks: 4

Construction
- Structure type: Embankment
- Cycle facilities: Yes
- Accessible: Yes

History
- Opened: May 16, 1908; 118 years ago
- Rebuilt: 1921; 105 years ago, 1980–1982; 44 years ago, 2012–2013; 13 years ago
- Former names: Hayes Street

Passengers
- 2025: 1,100,006 ▲2.7%

Services
| Preceding station | Chicago "L" | Following station |
|---|---|---|
| Morse toward Howard | Red Line | Granville toward 95th/Dan Ryan |
Purple Line does not stop here
Track layout
Location

Loyola is a station on the Chicago Transit Authority's 'L' system, served by the Red Line. It is located at 1200 West Loyola Avenue in the Rogers Park neighborhood of Chicago, Illinois. The station has high ridership by students from the nearby Lakeshore Campus of Loyola University Chicago. The Red Line right-of-way runs directly through the southwest corner of the campus. Purple Line weekday rush hour express service use the outside tracks but do not stop at this station.

== History ==
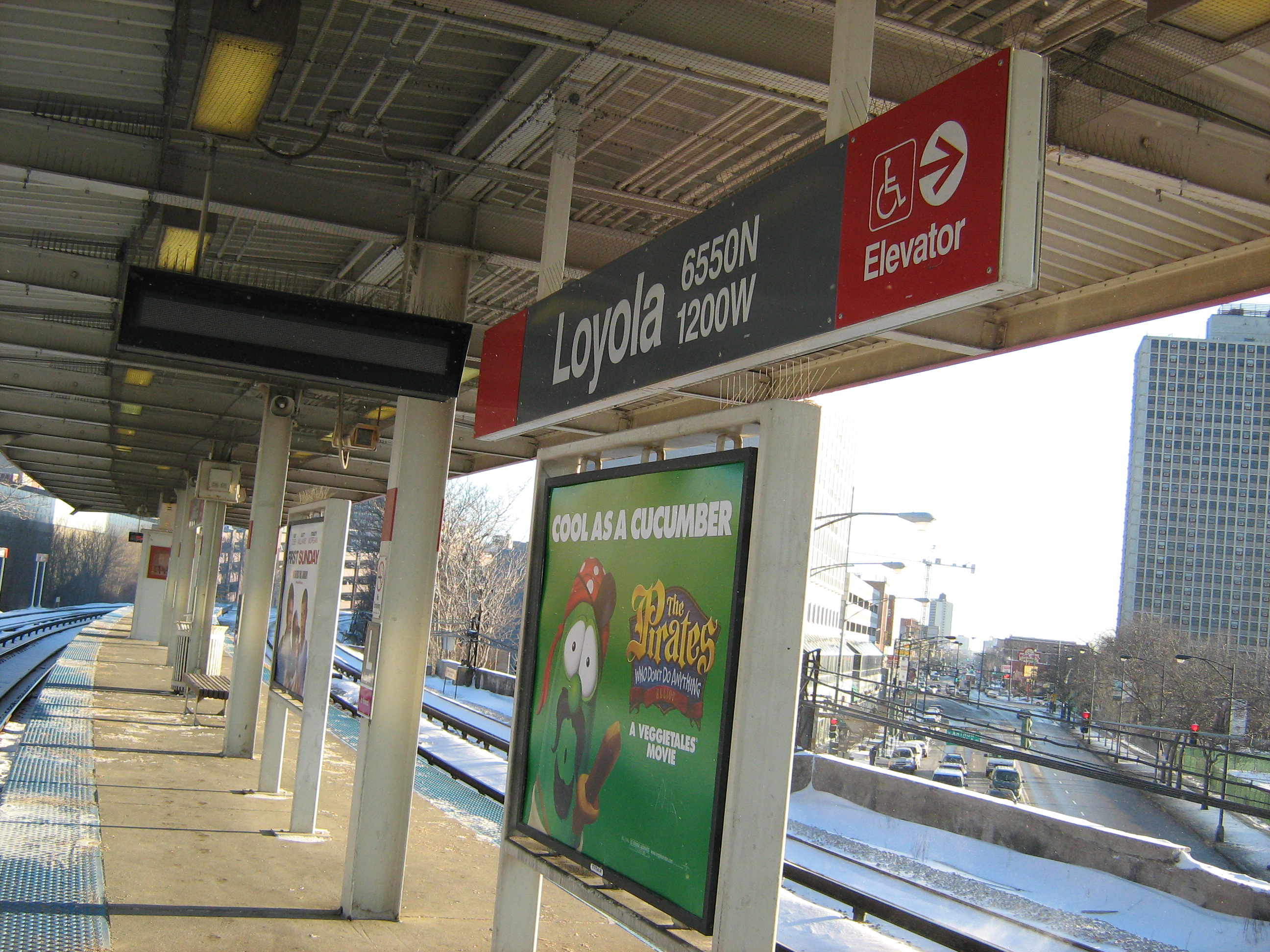

This is the third station at this location; the original opened in 1908 and was rebuilt in 1921, the current station was built from 1980 to 1982. The entrance to the original station was on Loyola Avenue, but the new station's entrance is technically on the west side of Sheridan Road, ideally situated across the street from a heavily used Loyola campus entrance. On Loyola Avenue, there is still a passageway leading to the turnstiles as well as an exit/entrance rotorgate operated by Ventra farecards. The station is accessible to those with disabilities.

The current platform is elevated on a fill embankment and an island between the southbound Red Line tracks to the west and the northbound Red Line tracks to the east. There is no platform access to the outside express tracks used by Purple Line Express trains during weekday rush hours. The station has an unusual layout. The platform is exceptionally long and narrow, over 1,000 feet (300 m) in length. It is also somewhat curved to the northwest. The platform is split in half by an elevator shaft. Southbound trains stop at the north portion of the platform while northbound trains stop at the south portion, although these locations were reversed prior to August 1998. Both halves of the platform can handle eight-car trains, the typical car length in use on the Red Line. A viaduct carries a portion of the southern platform over Sheridan Road.

The station house itself is also fairly large and boasts a great deal of concession space. As of 2024, the Loyola station is home to a Dunkin' Donuts franchise. A McDonald's restaurant formerly housed adjacent to the station closed in early 2012, in preparations for a renovation of the station house scheduled to begin in late-spring 2012. The planned renovations call for the construction of a pedestrian plaza adjacent to the station house. (see Loyola station renovation)

Between 1949 and 1976, Evanston Express trains (the service which would eventually be known as the Purple Line Express) also stopped at Loyola.

=== Loyola station renovation and Sister Jean Plaza ===
The station was renovated from 2012 to 2013, due to a new plaza that was built adjacent to the station, so the CTA decided to build a front entrance facing the plaza. The station remained open during construction and construction was staged in phases to maintain access and minimize impact on regular use of the station. The front entrance was renovated in 2013.

On August 21, 2022, the plaza was dedicated to Sister Jean in commemoration of her 103rd birthday. Sister Jean was the chaplain for the Loyola Ramblers men's basketball team, who became nationally known during the team's success in the 2018 NCAA tournament and return appearances in 2021 and 2022 tournaments.

== Bus connections ==
CTA

- 147 Outer DuSable Lake Shore Express
- 155 Devon
