= Howard Yard =

Chicago "L" rail yard

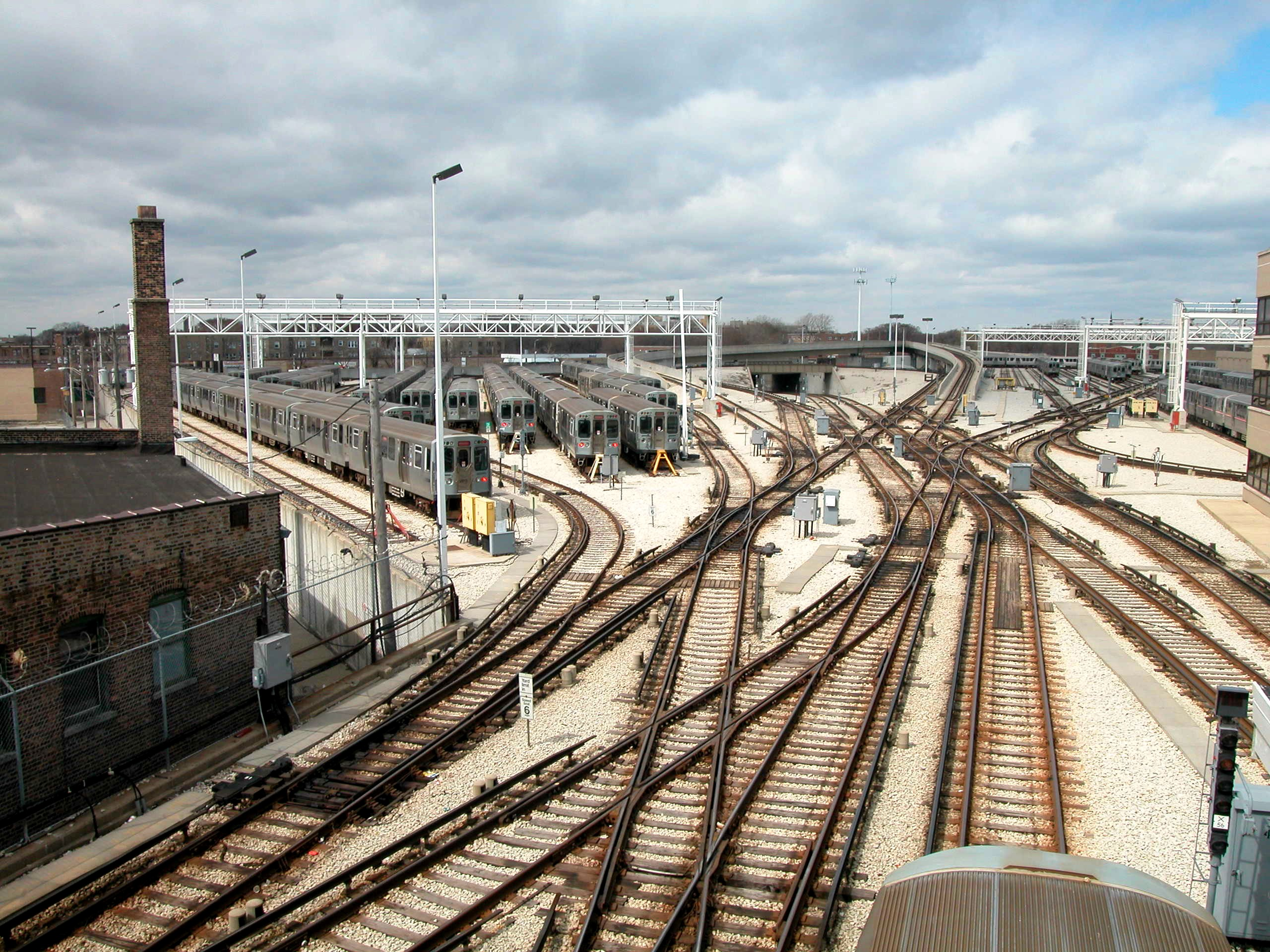
- Howard Yard, taken from Howard station facing North in 2003
- Interactive map of Howard Yard

Location
- Location: 1825 W. Juneway Terrace, Chicago, Illinois
- Coordinates: 42°01′20″N 87°40′32″W

Characteristics
- Owner: Chicago Transit Authority
- Type: Rapid transit
- Rolling stock: 5000-series
- Routes served: Purple Red Yellow

History
- Opened: 1919; 107 years ago

The Howard Yard is a CTA rail yard in the Rogers Park neighborhood on the North Side of Chicago, Illinois, on the border with Evanston, Illinois. It is the largest rail yard of the CTA, and stores cars from the Yellow, Red, and Purple Lines of the Chicago Transit Authority.

Currently, 5000-series railcars are stored here. It is adjacent to Howard station.

The yard was opened in 1919 and gradually replaced the functions of Wilson Yard, until the latter was destroyed by fire in 1996. The yard was rebuilt between 1991 and 1993.

A train derailed in the yard in 1990, disrupting rail traffic to Evanston. In 2023, a Yellow Line train collided with a CTA snowplow on tracks adjacent to the yard.
