= Yellow Line (CTA) =

Chicago "L" rapid transit line

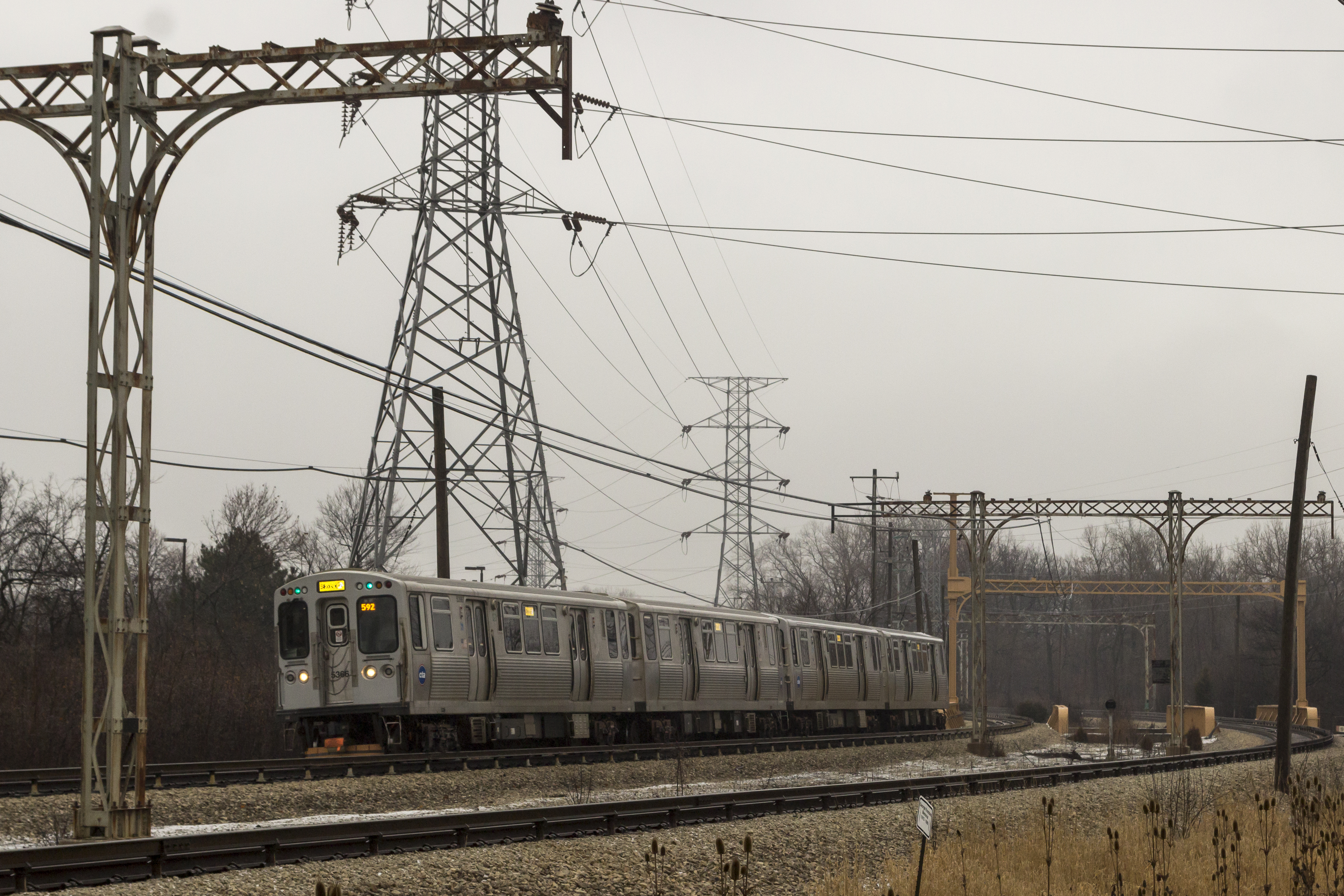
- A Yellow Line train approaches Oakton–Skokie

Overview
- Status: Operational
- Locale: Chicago and Skokie, Illinois, U.S.
- Termini: Howard; Dempster–Skokie
- Stations: 3

Service
- Type: Rapid transit, sometimes called Light metro by CTA
- System: Chicago "L"
- Operator(s): Chicago Transit Authority (1964–present); Chicago Rapid Transit Company (1925–1947)
- Depot: Howard Yard
- Rolling stock: 5000-series 2-car trains (typical); maximum 4 cars
- Daily ridership: 1,240 (avg. weekday 2024)

History
- Opened: March 28, 1925; 101 years ago
- Closed: March 27, 1948; 78 years ago
- Reopened: April 20, 1964; 62 years ago

Technical
- Line length: 4.7 mi (7.6 km)
- Character: Elevated and at-grade
- Track gauge: 4 ft 8 1/2 in (1,435 mm) standard gauge
- Electrification: Third rail, 600 V DC
- Operating speed: 35–55 mph (56–89 km/h)
Route map
Yellow Line highlighted in yellow
- All stations are accessible. Bus connections at all stations.

The Yellow Line, also known as the Skokie Swift, is a branch of the Chicago "L" train system in Chicago, Illinois. The 4.7-mile (7.6 km) route runs from the Howard Terminal on the north side of Chicago, through the southern part of Evanston and to the Dempster Terminal in Skokie, Illinois, making one intermediate stop at Oakton Street in downtown Skokie. It is the shortest line in the system when not counting the Purple Line during off-peak hours.

At Howard, Yellow Line passengers can transfer to the Purple or Red Lines of the "L". The Yellow Line is the only "L" line that does not go to The Loop and is the only "L" train route that is fully ADA accessible. It is also unique in that it runs in a below-grade trench for part of its length, even though it has no underground portions and does not run in an expressway median. It also includes grade segments and crossings at the western portion of the line. It was built using the tracks of the former Chicago North Shore and Milwaukee Railroad's high-speed Skokie Valley Route.

Extending the line to Old Orchard Mall in Skokie has been discussed. From its original opening in 1925 until 1948, the line had several intermediate stops in Evanston and Skokie, but these stations have long been out of use and dismantled. In June 2010, however, construction began on a new station at Oakton, which opened on April 30, 2012.

Trains operate using the Bombardier-built 5000-series railcars; each train consists of two cars. Average weekday boardings of 1,240 were reported in 2023, making it by far the least-used route in the CTA rail system. Until late 2009, the Yellow Line was operated with the 3200-series cars that were specially equipped with roof boards that, until late 2004, held pantographs (the roof boards remain on cars 3441-3456 to this day even after they were officially reassigned to the Brown Line). Occasionally, the Yellow Line borrows cars from the Red Line when short on cars.

== Route ==
The Yellow Line begins at the Dempster-Skokie terminal located at 5005 Dempster Street in Skokie. A stub track extends north of the station to allow trains to reverse. The line runs south from Dempster-Skokie at street level. After crossing Oakton Street, the Yellow Line turns east and crosses over Skokie Boulevard (U.S. Route 41). After the East Prairie Road grade crossing, the tracks rise to become an elevated route.

At this point, the route passes the Skokie Shops CTA maintenance facility and crosses over the North Shore Channel. After passing over Dodge Avenue, the tracks descend into a trench. The line remains in the trench for about 1 mile (1.6 km), then passes under the Metra Union Pacific North Line and Purple Line tracks to enter Howard Yard. The line then rises to serve the elevated Howard station. A small segment extends south of the station to allow Yellow and Purple Line trains to reverse.

== Operating hours and headways ==
The Yellow Line operates between Dempster-Skokie and Howard daily between 4:45 a.m. and 11:15 p.m. on weekdays, and between 6:15 a.m. and 11:15 p.m. on weekends and holidays. Service frequencies range from six trains per hour during rush hour to four trains per hour during other times.

== History ==
=== Niles Center Branch ===
The Yellow Line originally began as the Niles Center Branch of the old Chicago Rapid Transit Company (CRT). The rapid transit service began as part of the Chicago, North Shore, and Milwaukee Railroad's high-speed Skokie Valley interurban line on a 5-mile (8 km) section between Howard Terminal and Dempster Street, Niles Center. It was placed in operation on March 28, 1925.

The route included several intermediate stops through Evanston and Skokie (then called Niles Center) at Ridge, Asbury, Dodge, Crawford/East Prairie, Kostner, Oakton and Main. On March 27, 1948, the Chicago Transit Authority (who had just bought out the Chicago Rapid Transit Company in 1947) discontinued service over the Niles Center Branch and replaced it with the 97 Skokie bus route. The stations were closed and remained abandoned for the next 15 years.

On January 21, 1963, the Chicago North Shore and Milwaukee Railroad ceased all of its operations and later that year, 5 miles (8.0 km) of trackage between Howard and Dempster was purchased by the Chicago Transit Authority (CTA). The intermediate stations were not reopened. Some of the vacant station houses were used by other businesses, including a convenience store and an electrical supplier, before finally being demolished in the 1980s.

=== The Skokie Swift ===
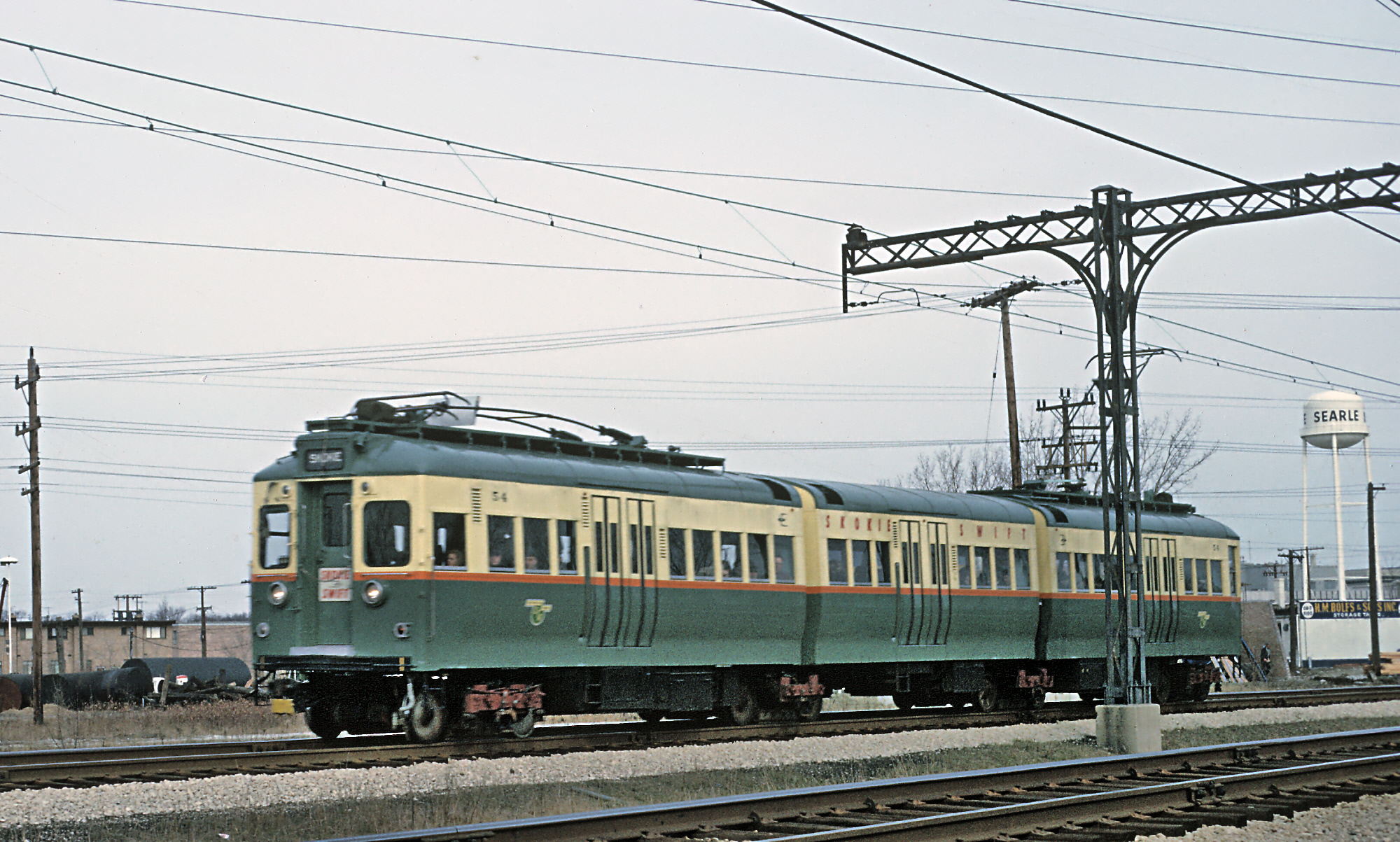
The Skokie Swift's rolling stock was dedicated of four 5000-series trainsets, seen here in April 1966.

The Skokie Swift high-speed (5 miles [8.0 km] in 6 1/2 minutes) shuttle service, between Howard Street in Chicago and Dempster Street in Skokie, was inaugurated on April 20, 1964, as a federally-aided mass transportation demonstration project. Participation in the net project costs was divided between the United States Department of Housing and Urban Development, CTA and the Village of Skokie.

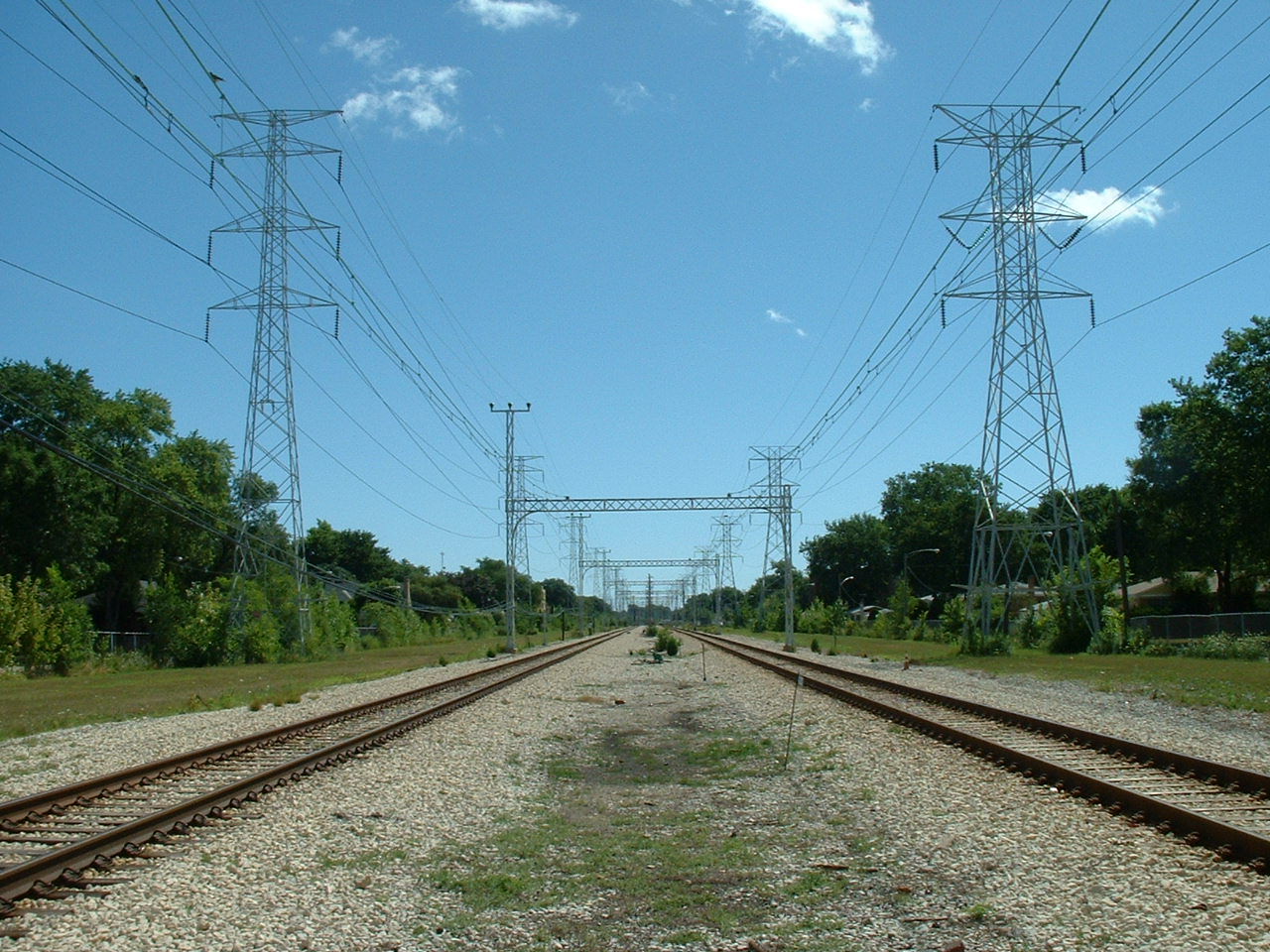
View eastbound from Kostner Avenue in 2002, prior to the installation of third rail

The success of this project had attracted nationwide attention. On its first day of service, the Skokie Swift carried nearly 4,000 passengers in a 16-hour period compared to approximately 1,600 passengers carried by the North Shore Line from the Dempster Terminal in a 12-hour period before the railroad terminated. Ridership continued to increase and by the end of the first year, nearly 6,000 passengers were riding the new line each weekday.

Because of the weekday success, Saturday service was inaugurated, with more than 2,000 riders. At the end of the two-year experimental period, 3.5 million people had used the new service and CTA authorized operation of the Skokie Swift as a permanent part of its rapid transit system.

The success of the Skokie Swift route demonstrated that many motorists will forsake their cars when high-speed mass transit is provided and to a minor extent, gave birth to the first use of light rail before the term was ever coined.

One of the distinctive features of the 5-mile (8 km) line was that approximately half was equipped with third rail while the other half was equipped with catenary left over from the Chicago North Shore & Milwaukee Railroad. Trains switched from third rail to overhead, and vice versa, without stopping, using distinctive pan trolleys designed by Skokie Swift Project Manager George Krambles.

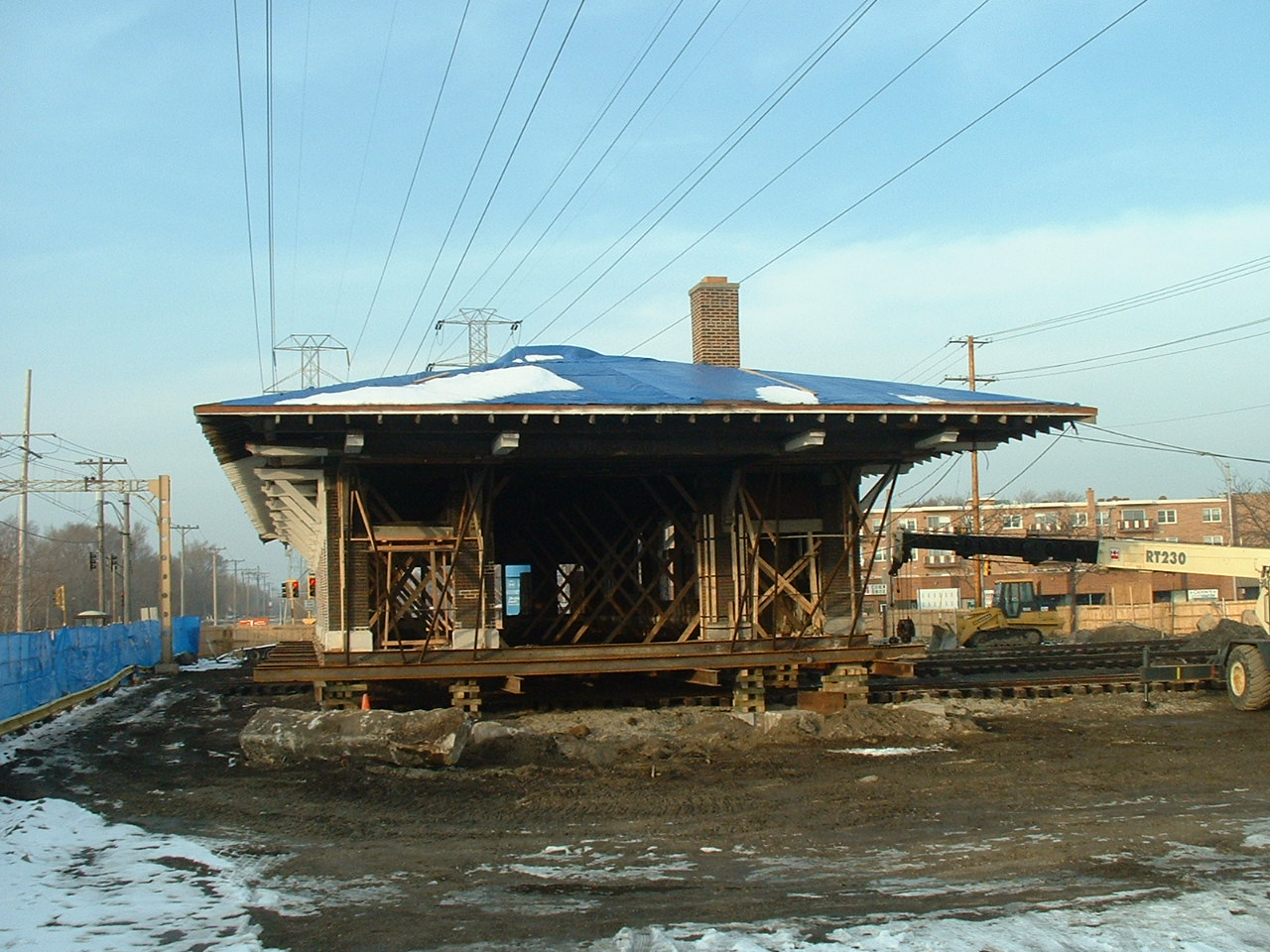
The old Dempster Street station building immediately prior to being moved

On February 9, 1992, Saturday service was discontinued during a service reduction by CTA. The "Skokie Swift" name was changed to the "Yellow Line" in 1993, when all Chicago 'L' lines were renamed for colors. The original name and logo of the Skokie Swift continues to be used today on station signage and route displays for Skokie-bound trains, making the Yellow Line the only "L" line to officially retain its original name. The Dempster Street Terminal was completely rebuilt from 1993 to 1994, with a new station house and train platforms. In 2003, the old brick station building (designed by architect Arthur U. Gerber) was moved 150 feet (46 m) to the east, then was restored and converted into commercial property.

The Skokie Swift was the only CTA rapid transit line to use overhead catenary for electrification. It was also the last CTA rapid transit line to use overhead, as portions of the Evanston and Lake Street lines used conventional trolley overhead until 1973 and 1962, respectively. Third-rail electrification was installed on the entire line in 2004 to increase reliability, allow compatibility with other rapid-transit lines and reduce maintenance costs.

In 2008, Saturday service was restored and brand new Sunday service was added.

==== Addition of downtown Skokie station ====
A groundbreaking ceremony marking the start of construction of a new intermediate stop on the Yellow Line, Oakton–Skokie, took place on June 21, 2010. The station is located in downtown Skokie and was the first new CTA station built since 2001. The new station opened on April 30, 2012.

=== Incidents ===
==== 2015 embankment collapse ====
On May 17, 2015, a section of the embankment west of McCormick Boulevard collapsed, causing the entire track to be damaged. The collapse was due to a failure in construction at the adjacent O'Brien Water Reclamation Plant. No trains could operate either way due to the track condition. At 10:00 PM on that day, an emergency closure of the Yellow Line was called. Yellow Line service returned on October 30, 2015, with the CTA offering free rides for one week and free parking at the Dempster-Skokie Terminal through the end of 2015.

==== 2023 collision ====
On November 16, 2023, a southbound Yellow Line train collided with a CTA snowplow, resulting in 38 injuries. The Yellow Line was promptly suspended and replaced with bus shuttles. Train service was eventually restored on January 5, 2024; however, the top speed of the train was reduced from 55 mph (89 km/h) to 35 mph (56 km/h). On April 20, 2025, the top speed was returned to 55 mph (89 km/h) for most of the route.

==== 2026 Derailments ====
On April 23, 2026, a railcar near Howard was derailed in the afternoon at around 5:30 PM, where service of the Yellow Line, the Purple Line and the Red Line between Howard and Thorndale was suspended and replaced with bus shuttles. Red Line service was restored around 9:15 PM and all other service to Howard was restored the following day.

=== Canceled projects ===
==== Additional infill station ====
Upon the successful reopening of the Oakton station, it was determined that stations at Dodge, Asbury or Ridge in southern Evanston could be built or rebuilt and added to the Yellow Line as well. In 2012, a local study found Asbury to be the most feasible of the three potential southern Evanston Yellow Line stations. As of 2019, the CTA website does not indicate that the Asbury project is being considered.

==== Extension to Old Orchard ====
In 2006, the Chicago Transit Authority was reviewing plans to extend the Yellow Line north from the current end-of-line terminal at Dempster–Skokie to a new end-of-line terminal at Old Orchard Mall, a distance of about 1.5 miles (2.4 km). After August 2008, two corridors remained for further study, the alignment along the Union Pacific Railroad (bus and heavy rail) as well as a combined track along Gross Point Road and Skokie Blvd (bus only). As of 30 April 2009, the two corridors had been narrowed down to one option – an elevated single track rail corridor that will follow the Union Pacific Railroad right of way. Under this plan, the Old Orchard terminal was to be elevated. However, as of 2010, the CTA was no longer pursuing the extension, in part because of local opposition to the planned terminal location in the parking lot of Niles North High School.

The Village of Skokie expressed renewed interest in a Yellow Line extension to the Old Orchard area in 2026, and had begun preliminary discussions on the subject with the state government. Unlike the 2009 proposal, this extension would not use the Niles North parking lot site as a terminal location. The Illinois Holocaust Museum and Westfield (which owns Old Orchard Mall) both expressed support for the hypothetical project.

== Station listing ==
Location	Station	Connections
Skokie	Dempster–Skokie	Pace Pulse: ■ Dempster Line; CTA buses: 54A 97; Pace buses: 250, 626; 42°02′25″N 87°45′08″W
Skokie	Main	Closed March 27, 1948; demolished
Skokie	Oakton–Skokie	CTA buses: 54A 97; Pace bus: 210; 42°01′38″N 87°44′51″W
Skokie	Kostner	Closed March 27, 1948; demolished
Skokie	Crawford–East Prairie	Closed March 27, 1948; demolished
Evanston	Dodge	Closed March 27, 1948; demolished
Evanston	Asbury	Closed March 27, 1948; demolished
Evanston	Ridge	Closed March 27, 1948; demolished
Chicago	Howard	Chicago "L": Red Purple; CTA buses: 22 97 147 201 206; Pace buses: 213, 215, 290; 42°01′09″N 87°40′23″W
