= Dempster–Skokie station =

Chicago "L" station

Dempster-Skokie 8800N 5000W
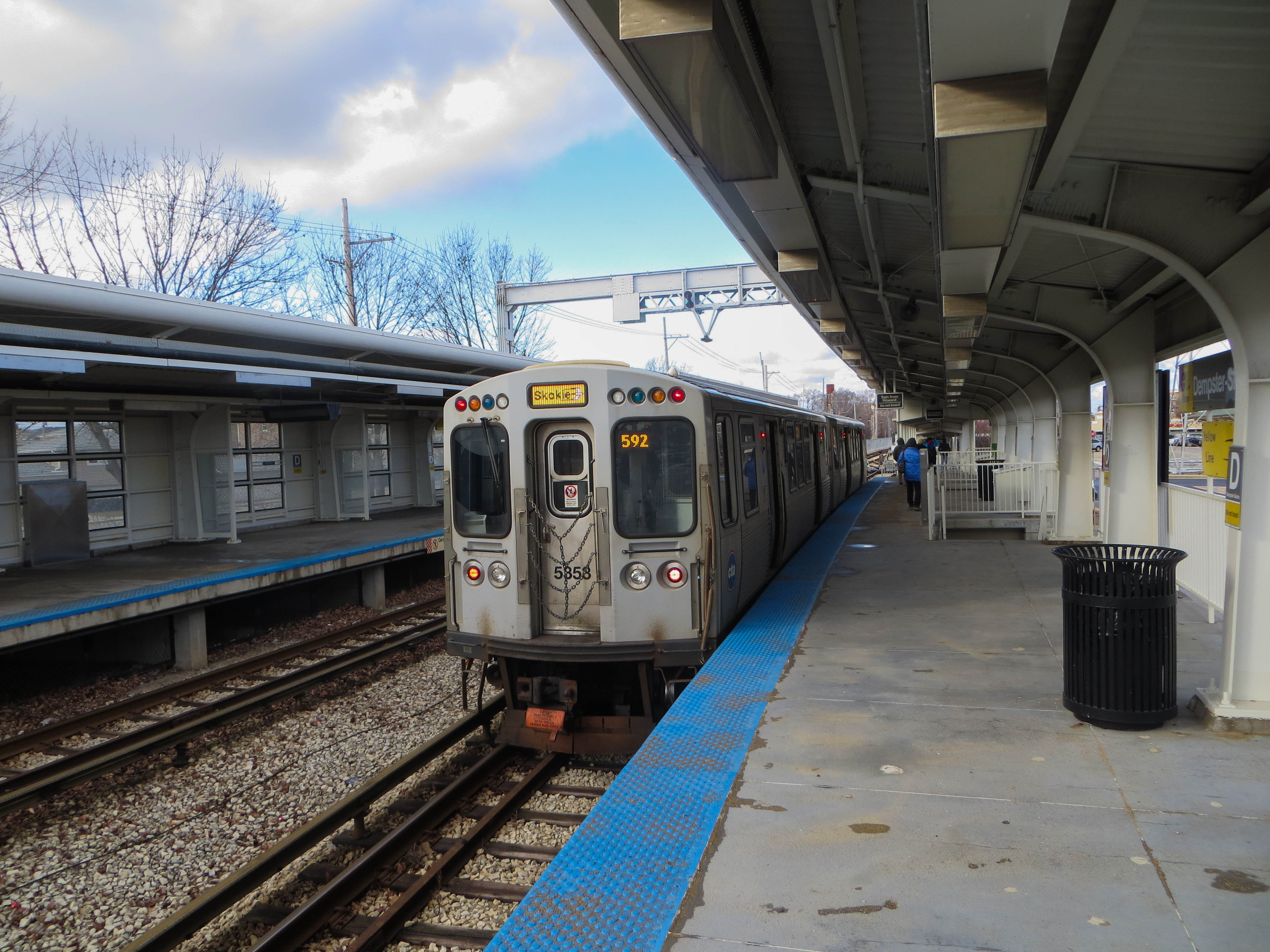
- A Yellow Line train discharges passengers at Dempster–Skokie.

General information
- Location: 5005 Dempster Street; Skokie, Illinois 60077
- Owner: Village of Skokie
- Line: Skokie Swift
- Platforms: 2 side platforms
- Tracks: 2

Construction
- Structure type: At-grade
- Parking: 441 spaces
- Cycle facilities: Yes
- Accessible: Yes

History
- Opened: March 28, 1925; 101 years ago
- Closed: March 27, 1948–April 20, 1964
- Rebuilt: 1993–1994
- Former names: Skokie Terminal; Dempster; Skokie

Passengers
- 2025: 295,997 ▲13.1%

Services
Preceding station	Chicago "L"	Following station
Terminus	Yellow Line	Oakton–Skokie toward Howard
Preceding station	Pace Pulse	Following station
Austin toward O'Hare MMF	Dempster Line	Crawford toward Davis CTA
Former services
Preceding station	Chicago North Shore and Milwaukee Railroad	Following station
Harmswoods toward Milwaukee	North Shore Line Skokie Valley Route	Howard Street toward Roosevelt Road
Preceding station	Chicago "L"	Following station
Terminus	Niles Center branch	Main Closed 1948 toward Howard
- Dempster Street Station
- U.S. National Register of Historic Places
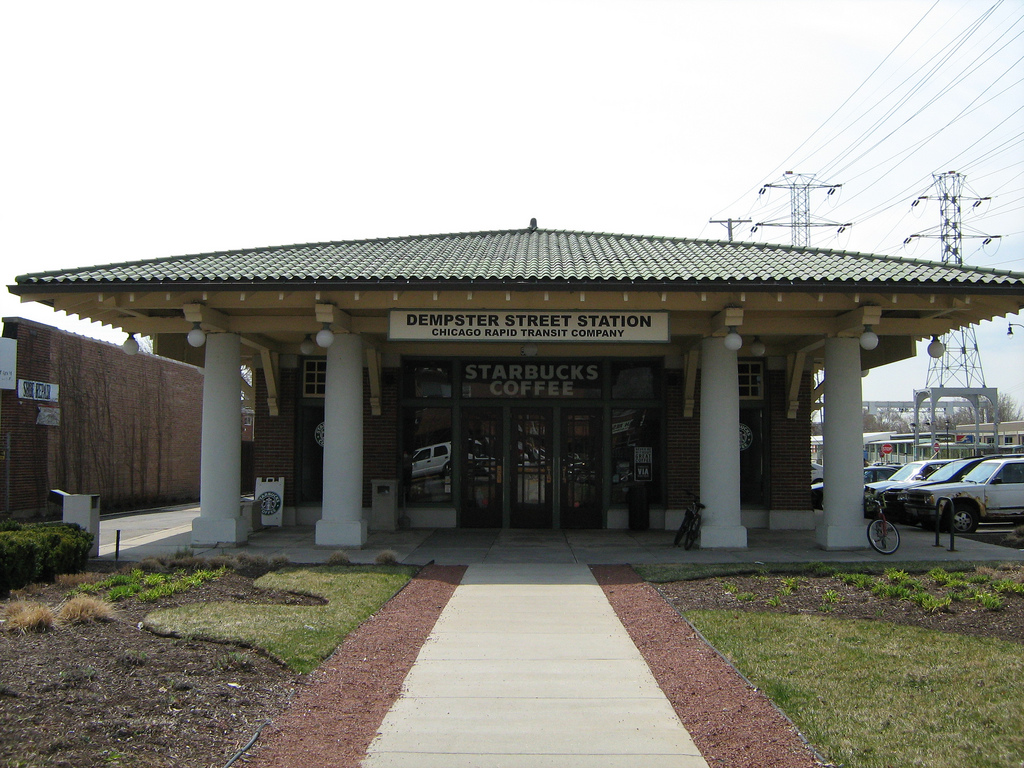
- Location: 5001 Dempster Street, Skokie, Illinois 60077
- Coordinates: 42°2′25″N 87°45′8″W
- NRHP reference No.: 95001005
- Added to NRHP: February 28, 1996
Track layout
Location

Dempster–Skokie, formerly known as Dempster, or Skokie, is an 'L' station on the CTA's Yellow Line at 5005 Dempster Street in Skokie, Illinois (directional coordinates 8800 north, 5000 west). It is one of three stops on the Yellow Line, and the line’s western terminus. Dempster–Skokie is one of two CTA rail stations in Skokie, and is at grade level.

== History ==
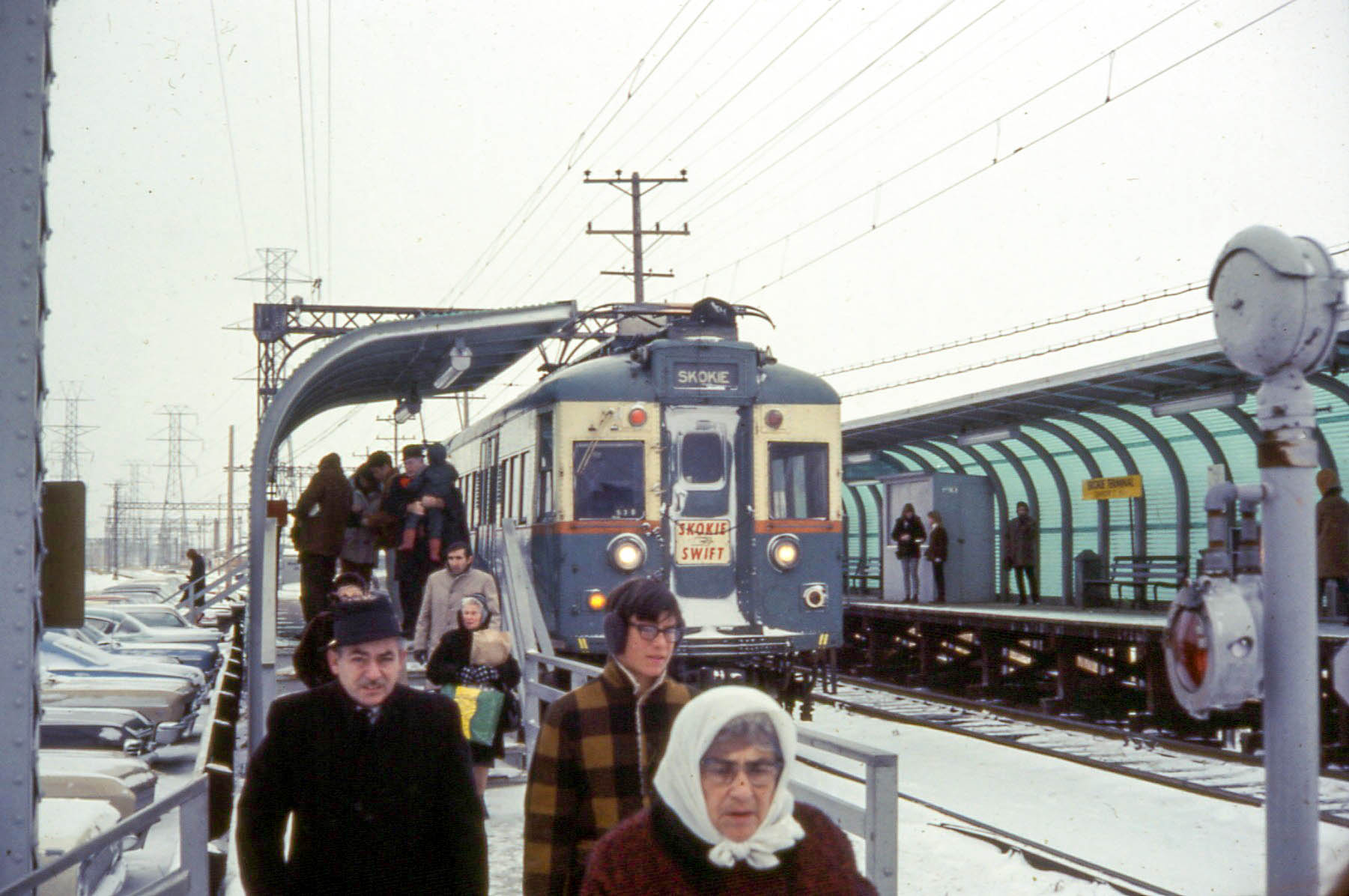
The "temporary" Skokie Swift platforms in 1968

The station was originally constructed in 1925 as part of a new high-speed bypass route for the North Shore Line known as the Skokie Valley Route. Trains of the Chicago Rapid Transit Company's Niles Center Route also used this station as a terminal until that service was ended by the CTA in 1948. The North Shore Line ceased operating in early 1963, but the CTA instated a new service the following year which served a "temporary" station on the same location. This service was, and to some extent still is, known as the Skokie Swift, and is currently called the Yellow Line.

The current stationhouse has been in place since 1994. The original Ludowici-tiled stationhouse, known as Dempster Street Station, is listed on the U.S. National Register of Historic Places and stands 130 feet (40 m) east of its original location, moved at a cost of $1 million in order to make space for the new station and its parking lot. The original station house is currently occupied by a Starbucks coffee shop and a law office; the Starbucks also has a drive-thru lane. The former station's address is 5001 Dempster Street.

== Service ==
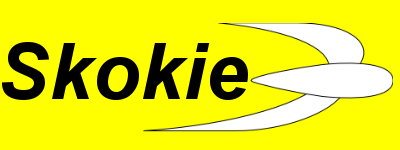
Skokie destination sign

The station houses bus stops for CTA and Pace buses and was once the Greyhound bus Skokie terminal. However, Greyhound discontinued service to Skokie in 2012.

Dempster–Skokie is one of two terminals on the "L" that uses only two side platforms instead of a single platform or island platforms (the other being Cottage Grove). The east platform does not have fare controls and only allows discharging. It is also one of three terminals to not have a yard assigned to it (the others being Cottage Grove and O'Hare).

On June 8, 2011, the Chicago Transit Board approved the renaming of the Skokie station to Dempster–Skokie. This was done with the announcement of the Oakton–Skokie name for the infill station at Oakton.

== Location ==
Dempster–Skokie is located at 5005 Dempster Street at Dempster Street and Bronx Avenue. It is 0.5 miles (0.80 km) from the I-94 Dempster ramp. It is located in the village of Skokie, Illinois, which borders Chicago at its southwest corner and Evanston to its east. Dempster–Skokie is one of the two 'L' stations to serve Skokie; the other is Oakton–Skokie. The station is the middle of a major commercial/transportation center of Skokie. The Skokie Valley Trail runs west of the station.

== Bus connections ==
CTA

- 54A North Cicero/Skokie Blvd (weekday rush hours only)
- 97 Skokie

Pace

- 250 Dempster Street
- 626 Skokie Valley Limited (weekday rush hours only)
- Pulse Dempster Line
