= Howard station (CTA) =

Chicago "L" station

Howard 7600N 1700W
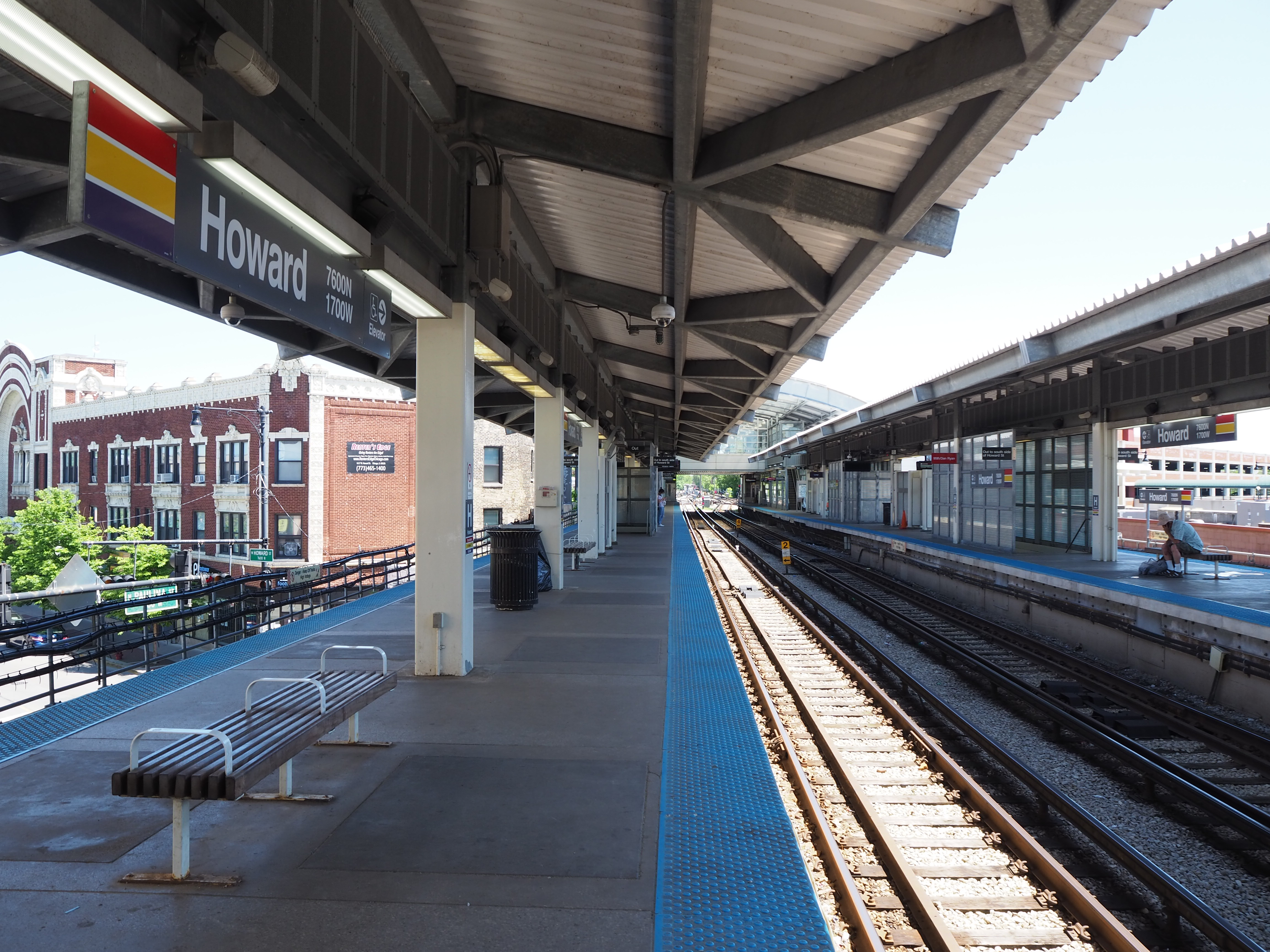
- Northbound platform for Yellow and Purple Line boarding and Red Line discharging

General information
- Location: 7519 North Paulina Street; Chicago, Illinois 60626
- Coordinates: 42.019161°N 87.673093°W
- Owner: Chicago Transit Authority
- Lines: North Side Main Line; Skokie Swift; Evanston Branch
- Platforms: 2 island platforms
- Tracks: 4
- Connections: CTA Buses; Pace Buses

Construction
- Structure type: Embankment
- Parking: 634 spaces
- Cycle facilities: Yes
- Accessible: Yes

History
- Opened: May 16, 1908; 118 years ago
- Rebuilt: 1921, 1964 (station house remodeled); 2000–03 (parking garage and bus terminal renovation); 2006–09 (station reconstruction)
- Former names: Howard Avenue

Passengers
- 2025: 1,063,673 ▲2.5%

Services
Preceding station	Chicago "L"	Following station
Terminus	Red Line	Jarvis toward 95th/Dan Ryan
Oakton–Skokie toward Dempster–Skokie	Yellow Line	Terminus
South Boulevard toward Linden	Purple Line	Terminus
South Boulevard toward Linden	Purple Line Express	Wilson toward Loop (Clark/Lake)
Former services
Preceding station	Chicago North Shore and Milwaukee Railroad	Following station
Church toward North Chicago Junction	North Shore Line Shore Line Route	Wilson Avenue toward Roosevelt Road
Skokie toward Milwaukee	North Shore Line Skokie Valley Route	Wilson Avenue toward Roosevelt Road
Preceding station	Chicago "L"	Following station
Ridge Closed 1948 toward Dempster	Niles Center branch	Terminus
Calvary Closed 1931 toward Linden	Evanston Line	Terminus
Track layout
Location

Howard is an 'L' station in Chicago, Illinois on the North Side Main Line. It is the northern terminus of the Red Line and the eastern terminus of the Yellow Line; it also serves the Purple Line, for which it is the southern terminus at non-rush hour times on weekdays and all day on weekends. Trains on the Chicago North Shore and Milwaukee Railroad (North Shore Line) also stopped at Howard from 1926 until that line was abandoned in 1963.

== Location ==
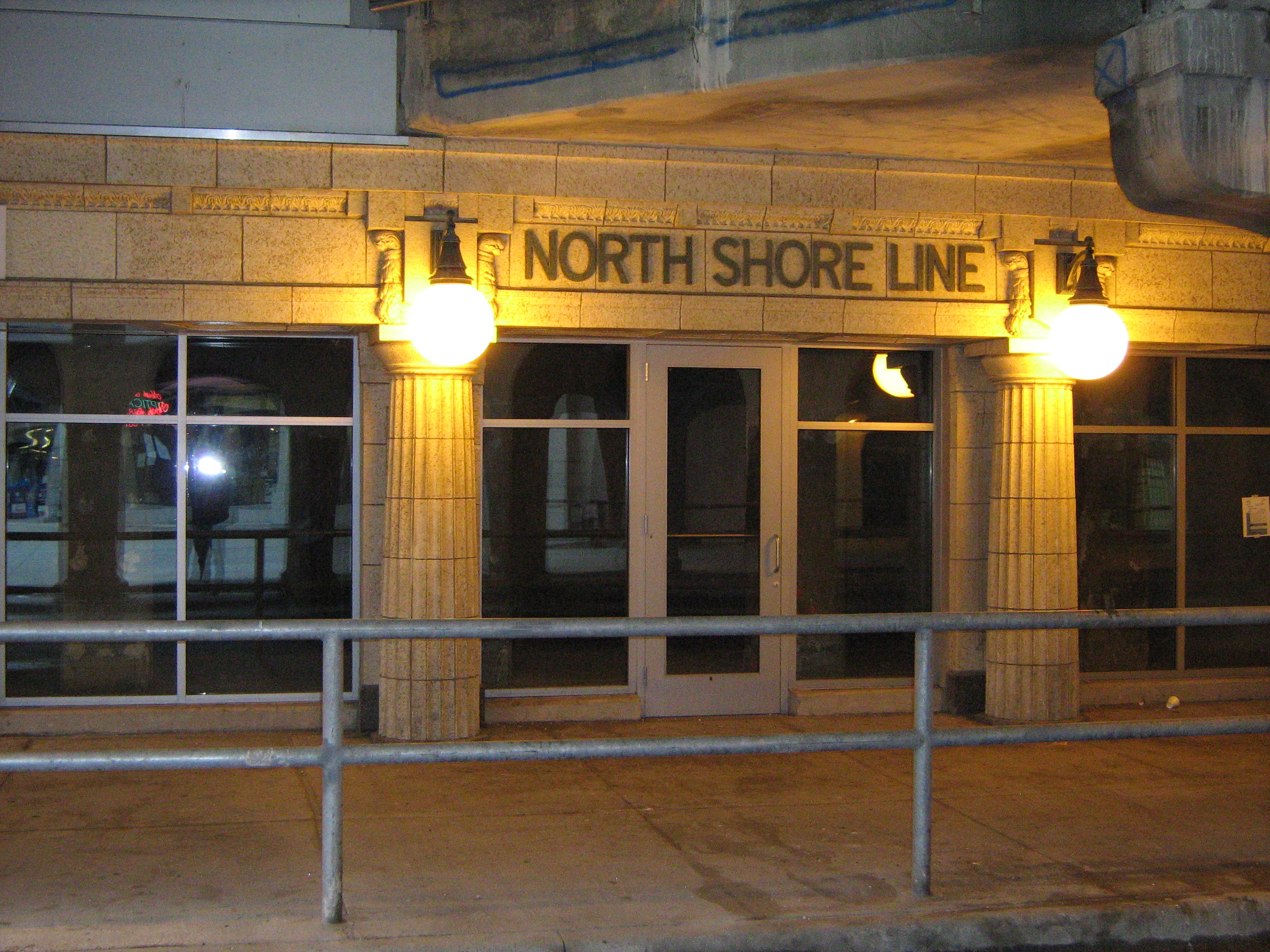
The former North Shore Line entrance on the north side of Howard Street has been preserved and restored to use, now as an auxiliary exit

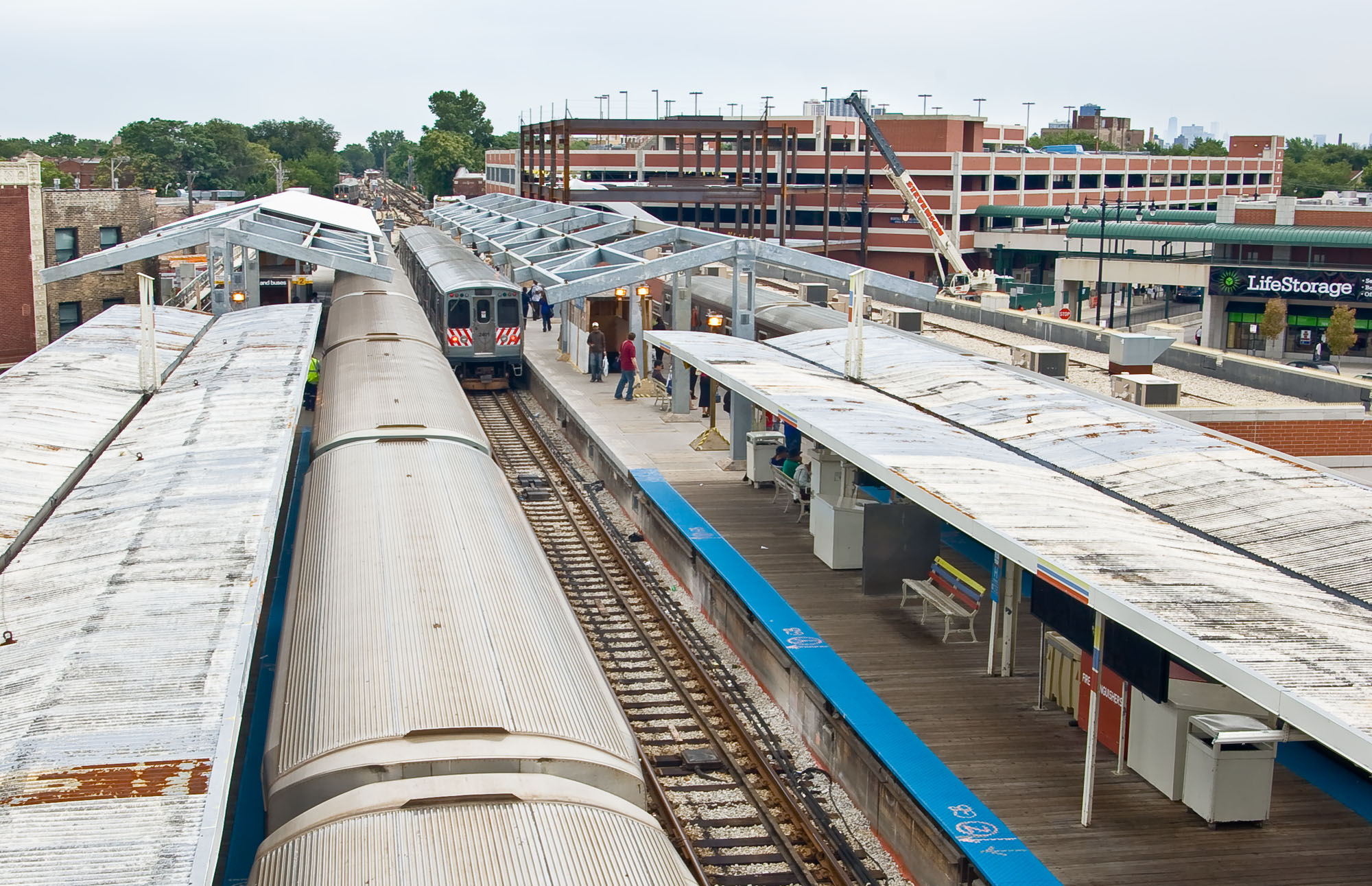
Howard station during reconstruction in August 2007. In the foreground are the wooden platforms and canopies dating from 1921; in the background new concrete platforms are under construction.

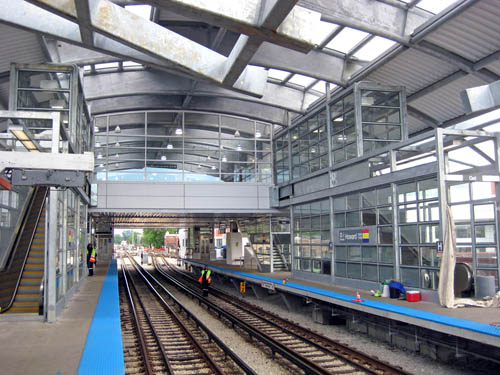
Platform, June 2008

Howard station is located at 7519 North Paulina Street in Chicago, Illinois, at Paulina Street and Howard Street. The station is in the Rogers Park community area of Chicago, just south of the border with the city of Evanston. It is one of four 'L' stations in Rogers Park, the others being Jarvis, Morse, and Loyola.

== History ==
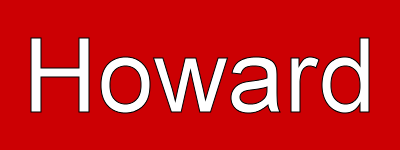
Red Destination sign

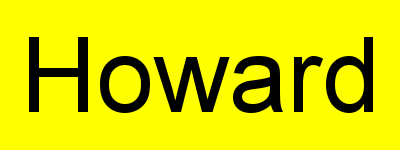
Yellow destination sign

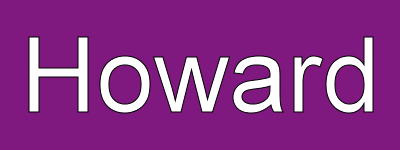
Purple destination sign

The Chicago and Evanston Railroad constructed a route from Union Station in Chicago into Evanston in 1885 that became the Chicago and Evanston branch of the Chicago, Milwaukee & St. Paul Railroad (Milwaukee Road). In 1908, the Northwestern Elevated Railroad extended service north from Wilson station and into Evanston using the right of way of the Milwaukee Road. The Northwestern Elevated took over the operation of passenger services from the Milwaukee Road, rebuilt the stations along the line, and added new stations including one at Howard Avenue (now Howard Street). The station was rebuilt in 1921 when the line through the station was elevated onto an embankment. An escalator was added in 1964.

Between 2006 and 2009, the station was rebuilt. A new station house was constructed on Paulina Street providing an accessible path between the station platforms and the multi-story parking garage and bus terminal to the west of the station. The platforms and canopies were rebuilt, and the former main entrance on Howard Street entrance was renovated to be used as an auxiliary entrance to the new station. The station remained open throughout reconstruction, which was completed on March 20, 2009.

== Station layout ==
A Park and Ride with 634 spaces, and sheltered bicycles are provided at this station. A large maintenance yard and rolling stock storage facility, known as Howard Yard, is just north of the station. Northbound Purple and Yellow Line trains pass through the yard on the way to their terminal, and Red Line trains travel from the northbound platform to the southbound platform via a balloon loop in the yard. Some Red Line trains will terminate at the southbound platform, skipping the balloon loop. Southbound Yellow Line trains terminate at this station using a stub track located between the Red Line tracks south of the station, while non-rush hour Purple Line trains terminate on track 4 near Fargo Avenue.

== Connecting bus routes ==
CTA

- 22 Clark
- 97 Skokie
- 147 Outer DuSable Lake Shore Express
- 201 Central/Ridge (Monday–Saturday only)
- 206 Evanston Circulator (weekday rush hours only)

Pace

- 213 Green Bay Road (Monday–Saturday only)
- 215 Crawford/Howard
- 290 Touhy Avenue
