= Red and Purple Modernization Project =

Rapid transit project in Illinois, U.S.

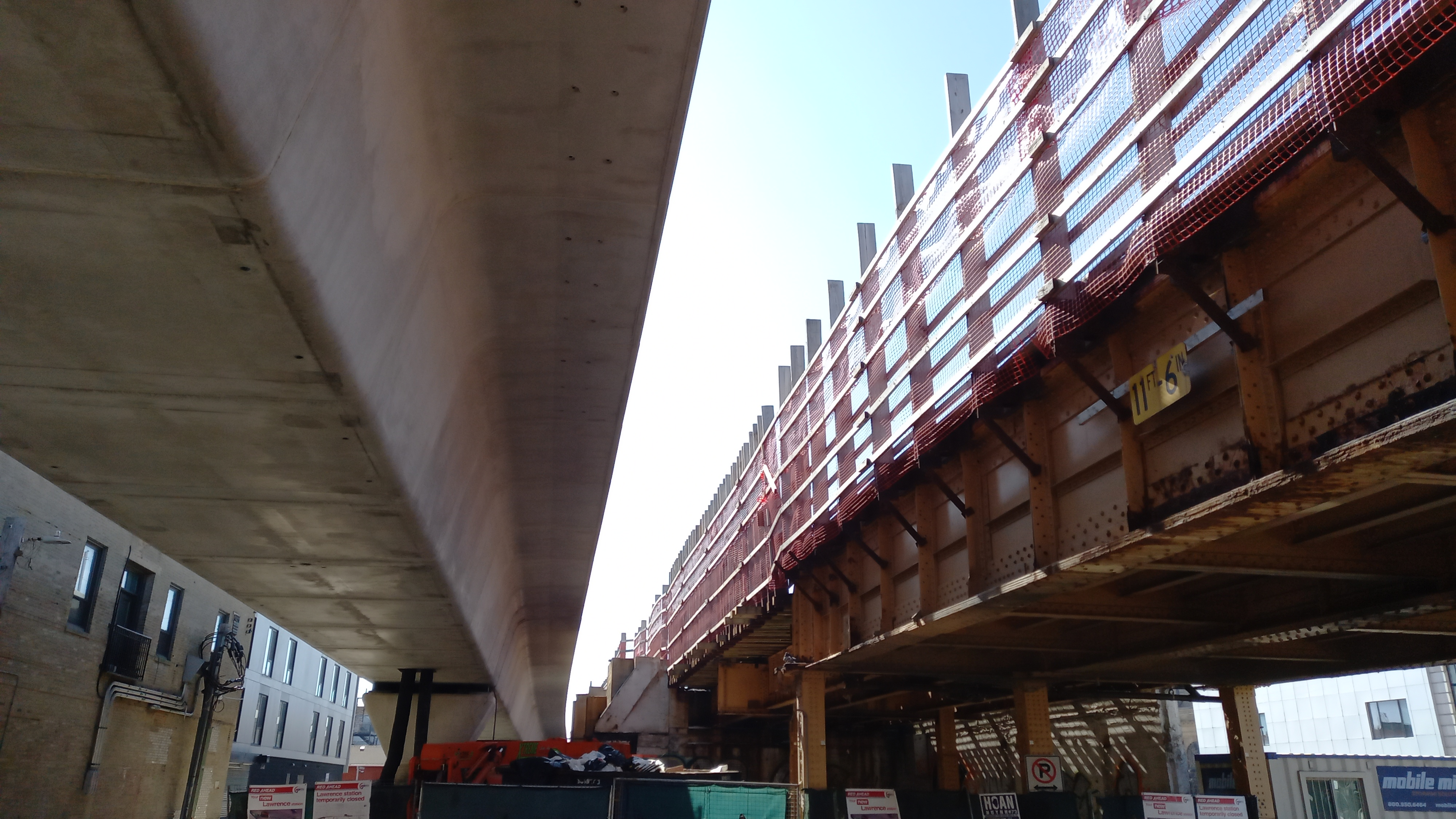
- Juxtaposition of old embankment (right) and new box-girder viaducts (left) in 2023

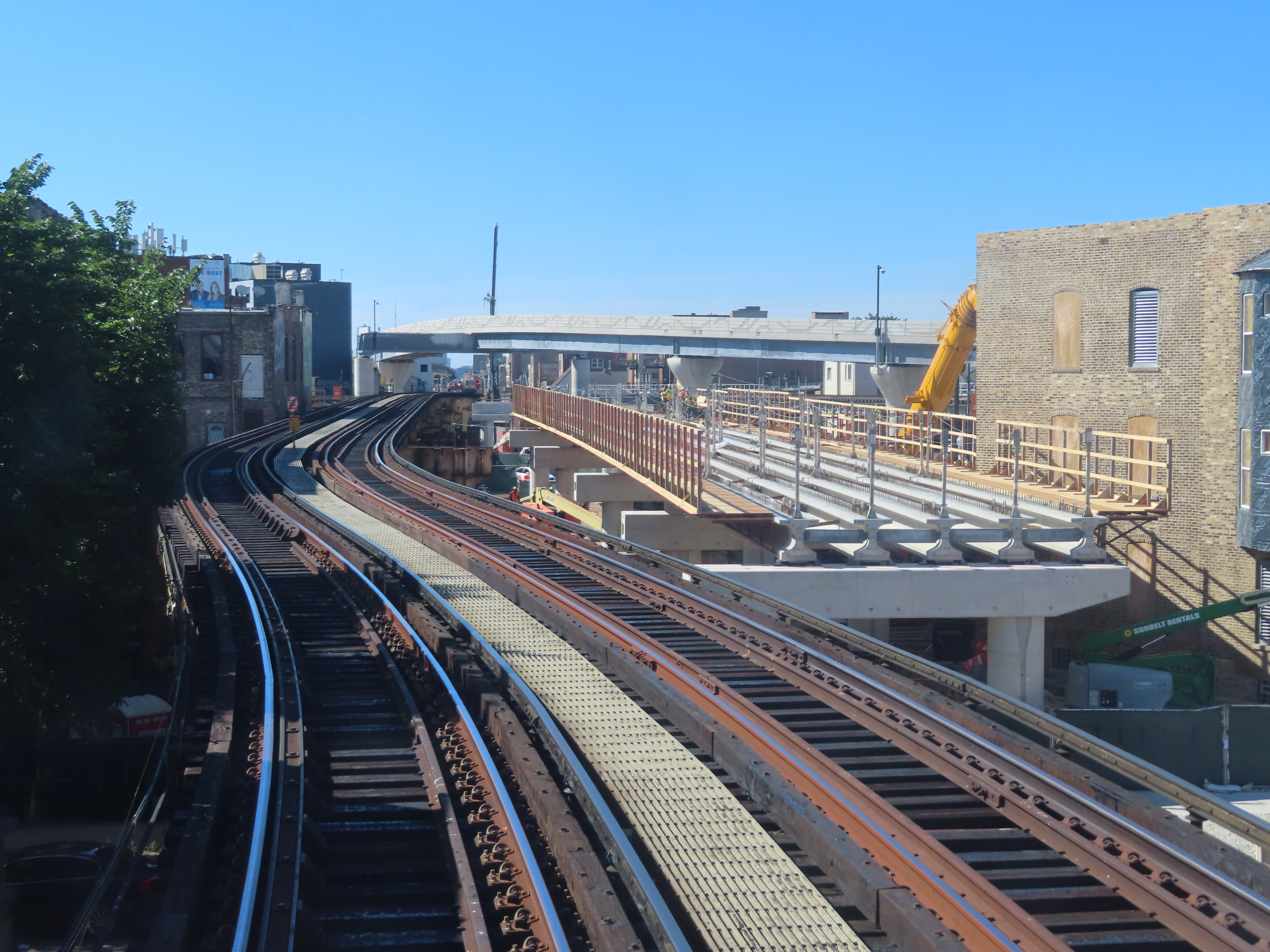
- Construction at Clark Junction in 2022
- Location: Chicago–Wilmette, Illinois, U.S.
- Proposer: Chicago Transit Authority
- Project website: www.transitchicago.com/rpm/
- Status: Complete (Phase 1); Proposed (Phase 2)
- Type: Rail rapid transit
- Cost estimate: $2.1 billion (Phase 1)
- Start date: October 2, 2019 (Phase 1)
- Completion date: July 20, 2025 (Phase 1)
- Stakeholders: Walsh Group (general contractor); Fluor Corporation (general contractor); Stantec (lead designer); EXP (design consultant); International Bridge Technologies (design consultant); Atlas Technical Consultants (design consultant)

The Red and Purple Modernization (RPM) Project is a multi-phased reconstruction project coordinated by the Chicago Transit Authority (CTA) in the North Side of Chicago, Evanston, and Wilmette. As part of the broader Red Ahead program, the RPM project plans to replace aging infrastructure on the North Side main line north of Belmont station and the Evanston branch. The latter branch is served by the Purple Line, while the former north of Belmont station is served by the Red Line and the Purple Line Express. Both of the Chicago "L" branches were built between 1900 and 1912, with most of the section north of Wilson station being embanked by 1931.

Early planning for the project began in 2009 with a vision study, which assessed the conditions of the two branches. The CTA opted for modernization in 2011. Construction for Phase One of the project occurred from October 2, 2019, to July 20, 2025. At the junction between the North Side main line and the Ravenswood branch (Clark Junction), the Red-Purple Bypass Project replaced a level junction with a flying junction, allowing northbound Brown Line trains to cross above main line tracks. Additionally, Lawrence, Argyle, Berwyn, and Bryn Mawr stations as well as a section of the viaduct hosting these stations were rebuilt.

== Background ==
On May 31, 1900, the Northwestern Elevated Railroad Company opened the North Side main line from the Loop Elevated to Wilson station. In 1907, the Ravenswood branch opened from the newly built Clark Junction north of Belmont station to Kimball station. In 1908, the main line was extended along an existing at-grade railroad, which was built by the Chicago and Evanston Railroad (C&E), to Central station in Evanston. In 1912, the line was extended to Linden station in Wilmette.

From 1908 to 1931, the North Side main line and the Evanston branch were being elevated piecemeal from Wilson to Isabella stations. An embankment was chosen to safely convey heavy C&E freight trains, which ran along the embanked "L" tracks until April 30, 1973. Embankment tracks remained in use for rapid transit service.

== Early planning ==
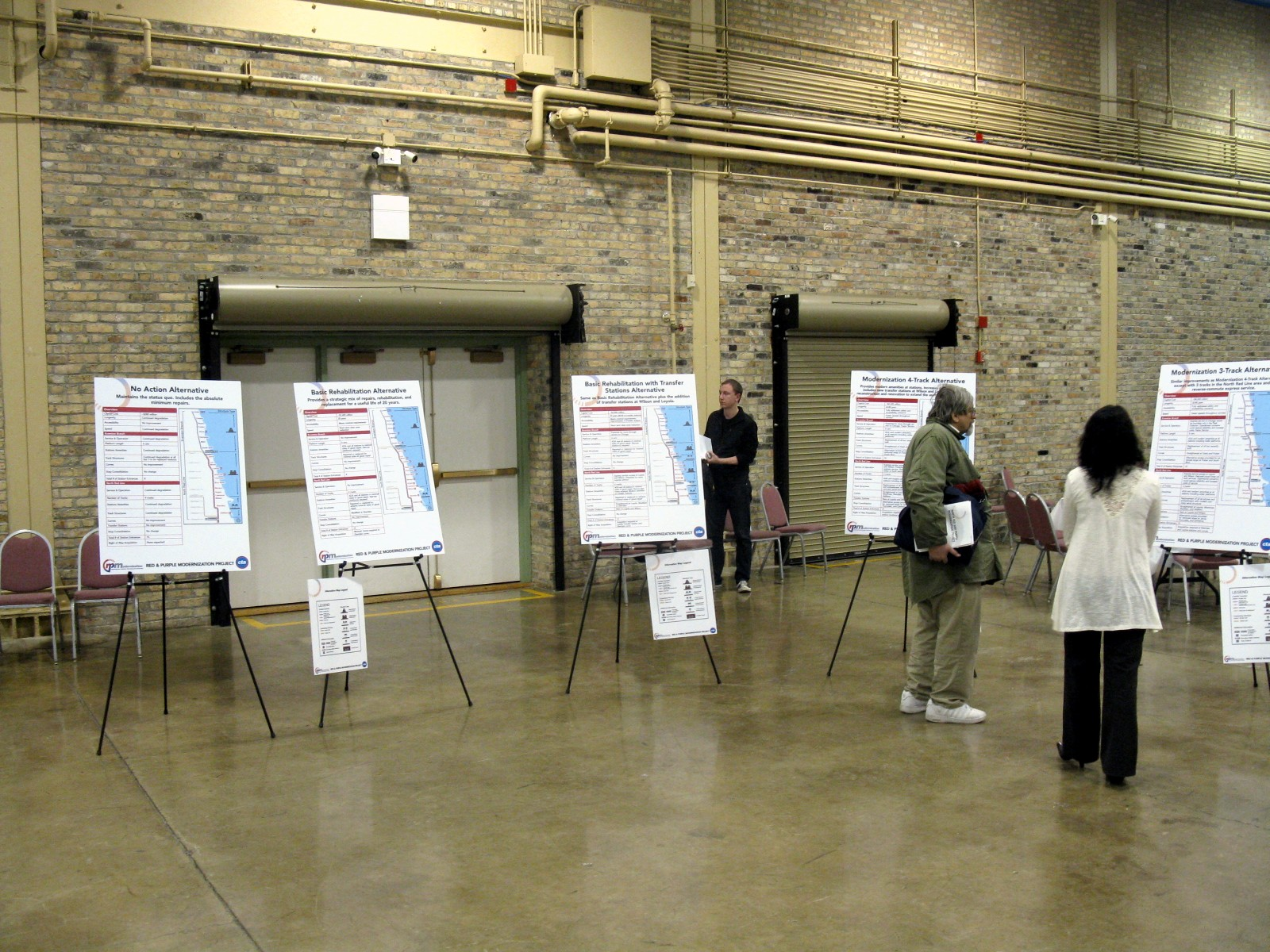
One of the public meetings being held for the modernization project, January 2011

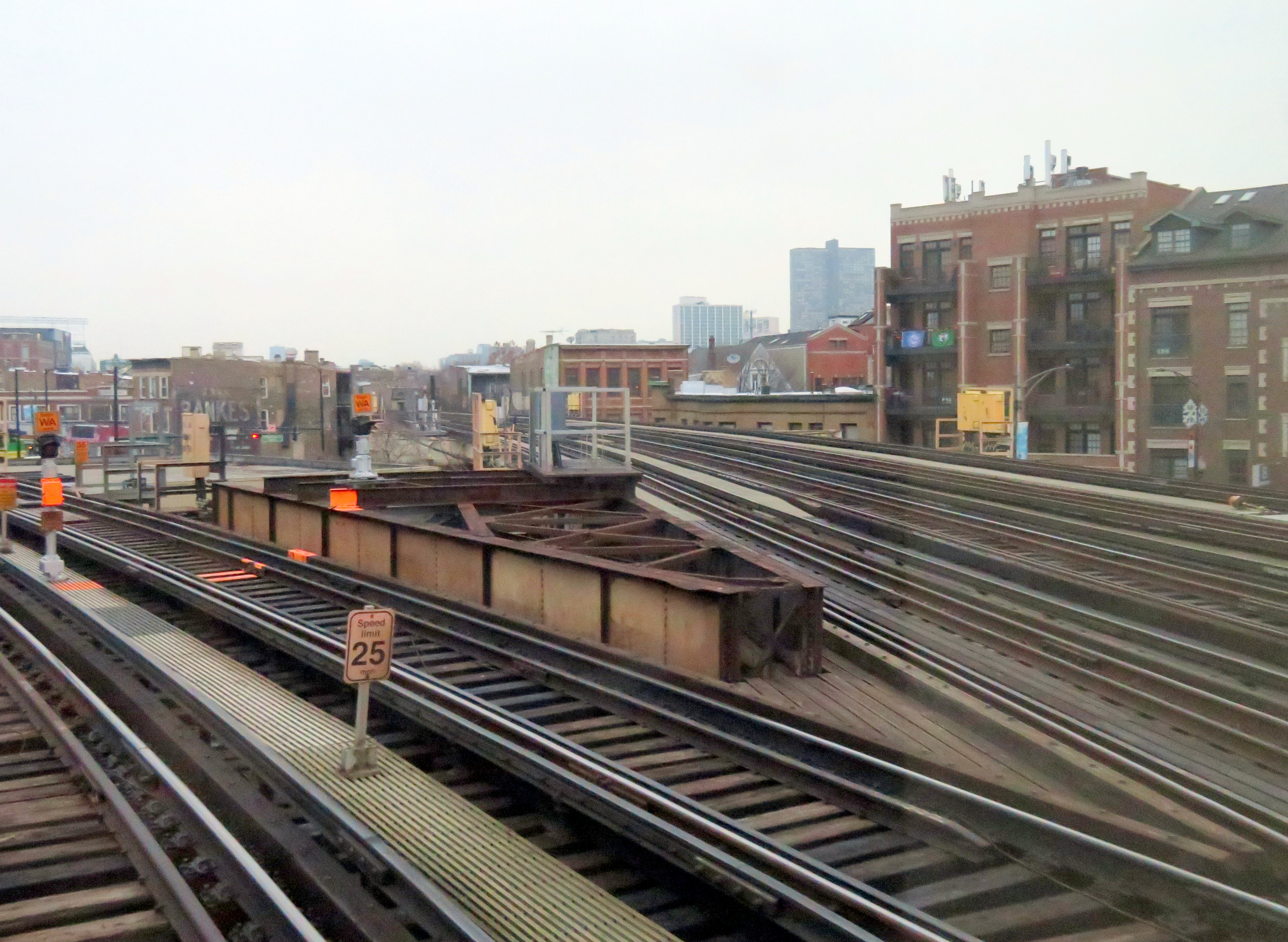
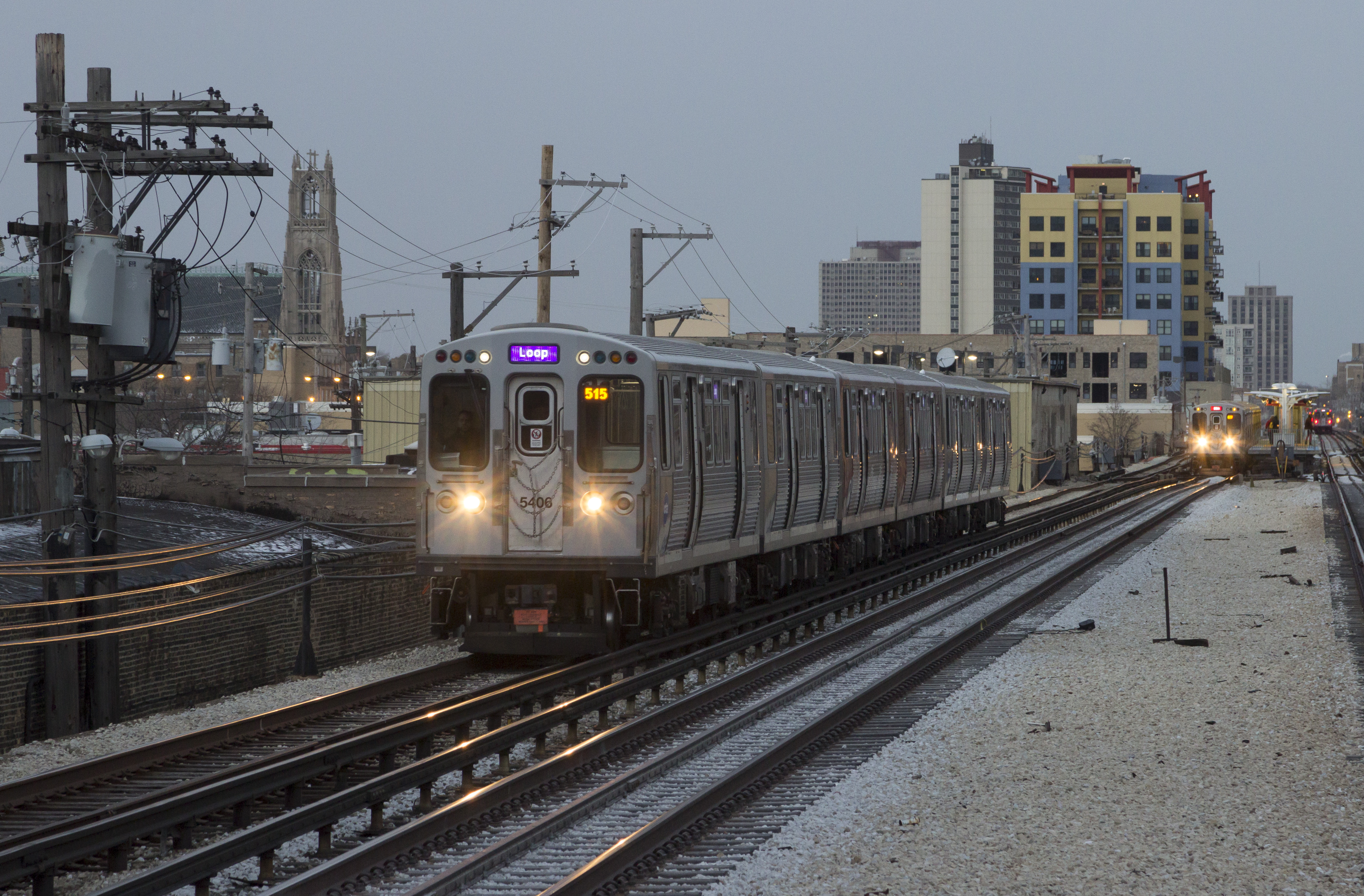
Clark Junction (top) and Lawrence–Bryn Mawr segment (bottom) prior to RPM construction

Between 2009 and 2010, the CTA conducted a vision study surrounding the North Side main line and the Evanston branch from Belmont to Linden stations. Deteriorating track conditions and old railroad signals have contributed to slow zones on both branches. In addition, many stations on the said branches were not compliant with the Americans with Disabilities Act (ADA) due to a lack of accessibility features, and existing station capacity was not enough to accommodate growing ridership. In October 2010, the CTA chose modernization as the locally preferred alternative.

In January 2011, the CTA and the Federal Transit Administration (FTA) began drafting the environmental impact statement (EIS) for the "Red and Purple Modernization Project". From that same month, public meetings on the project were held. During the planning process, several alternatives that were once considered were dropped, such as a new elevated viaduct with one fewer track and a double-track subway line.

In November 2013, the CTA applied for the Core Capacity grant from the FTA. The transit agency initially received $35 million in August 2014.

Earlier in 2014, the CTA made the decision to divide the RPM project into phases. A new EIS was being drafted for just Phase One (Red-Purple Bypass at Clark Junction and the Lawrence–Bryn Mawr segment), which concluded in 2015 with two Categorical Exclusions and two Findings of No Significant Impact.

On November 30, 2016, the Chicago City Council implemented a 36-year tax increment financing (TIF) district around much of the North Side main line for the modernization project. The potential revenue from TIF allowed the CTA to obtain a total of $1.1 billion in federal funding, which was finalized in January 2017 under a Full Funding Grant Agreement with the FTA. Federal funding included $956.61 million in Core Capacity grant and $115.73 million in Congestion Mitigation and Air Quality grant; local funding included $610.06 million from TIF revenue and $384.30 million from CTA sales tax revenue. The overall project cost for Phase One was set to $2.1 billion.

In June 2017, the CTA filed a Request for Qualifications in search of a project contractor. On December 13, 2018, through a $1.2 billion contract, the CTA selected Walsh-Fluor Design Build Team (Walsh Group and Fluor Corporation) as the general contractor for RPM Phase One.

=== Interim improvements ===
In 2012, a segment of the North Side main line between Wilson and Jarvis was rehabilitated as part of the $86-million Red North Station Interim Improvements project. Kiewit Infrastructure, the project contractor, received $57.4 million. Multiple stations except for Wilson, Bryn Mawr, and Loyola were temporarily closed and renovated in six-week phases from June to December 2012. In June 2013, the CTA announced the installation of public artworks in all of the rehabilitated stations.

In a separate project between 2012 and 2013, Loyola station received a $17 million renovation that included the addition of an adjacent public plaza. Kiewit Infrastructure was also the contractor for the renovation.

Before the mid-2010s, Wilson station had an unusual track configuration where the southbound express track briefly shifted away from the main line. The shift was designed to connect the North Side main line with the now-demolished C&E tracks. Between 2014 and 2017, the station was entirely reconstructed as part of a $203 million project, which added Purple Line Express service on the station.

=== Criticism ===
The CTA had originally considered consolidating closely spaced stations to reduce train travel times. This proposal was eventually dropped as nearby residents and aldermen criticized it as a form of service cuts.

Residents near Clark Junction criticized the Brown Line flyover, citing the demolition of 16 homes and the flyover being visually imposing. Then-mayoral candidate Chuy García also criticized the flyover as "an unnecessary expenditure of taxpayer funds that will generate little return on investment".

== Phase One construction ==
Phase One construction began with a groundbreaking ceremony on October 2, 2019. Construction took place around Clark Junction and a section between Lawrence and Bryn Mawr stations.

=== Lawrence to Bryn Mawr ===
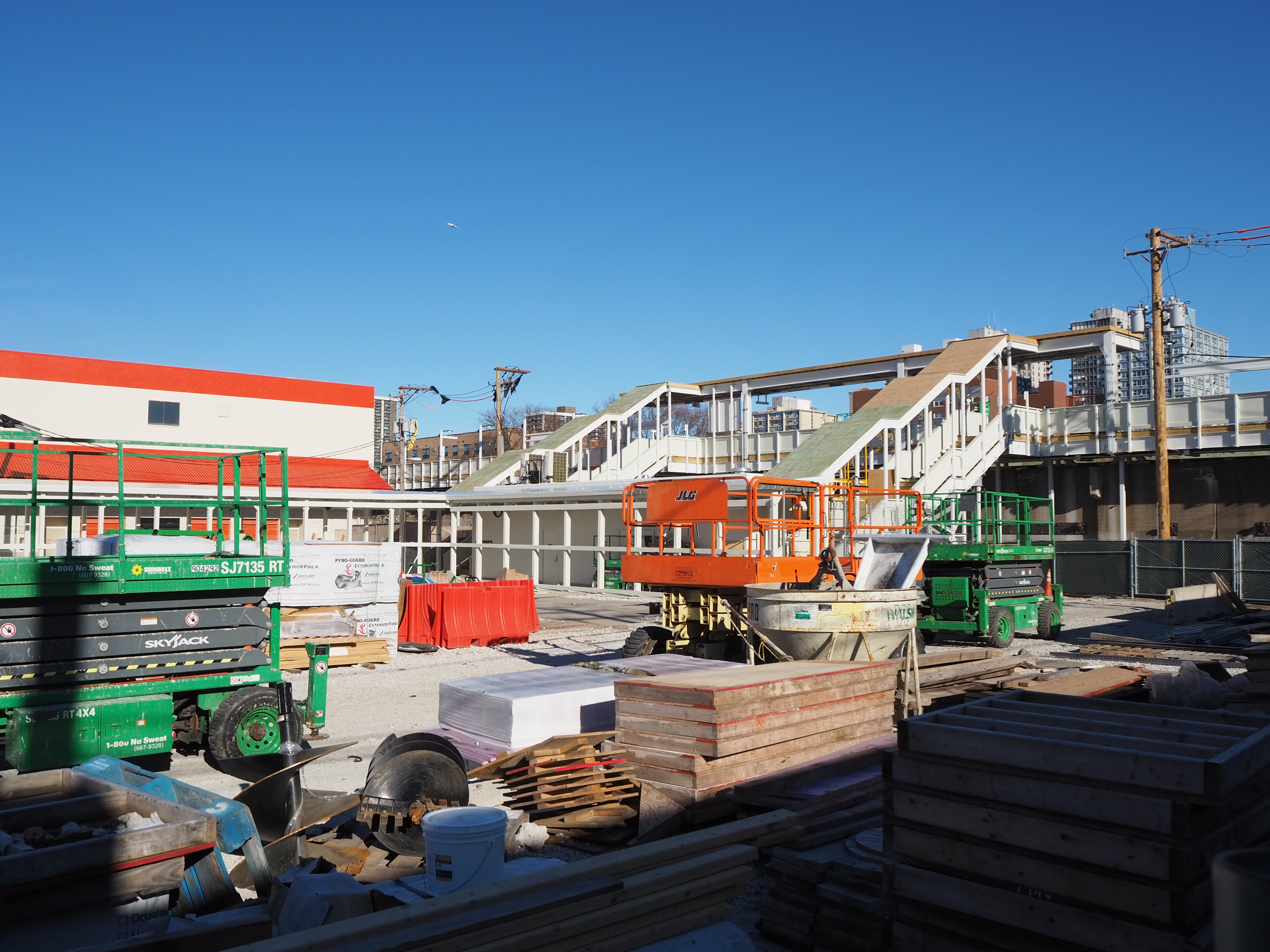
Temporary station facility at Bryn Mawr station, December 2020

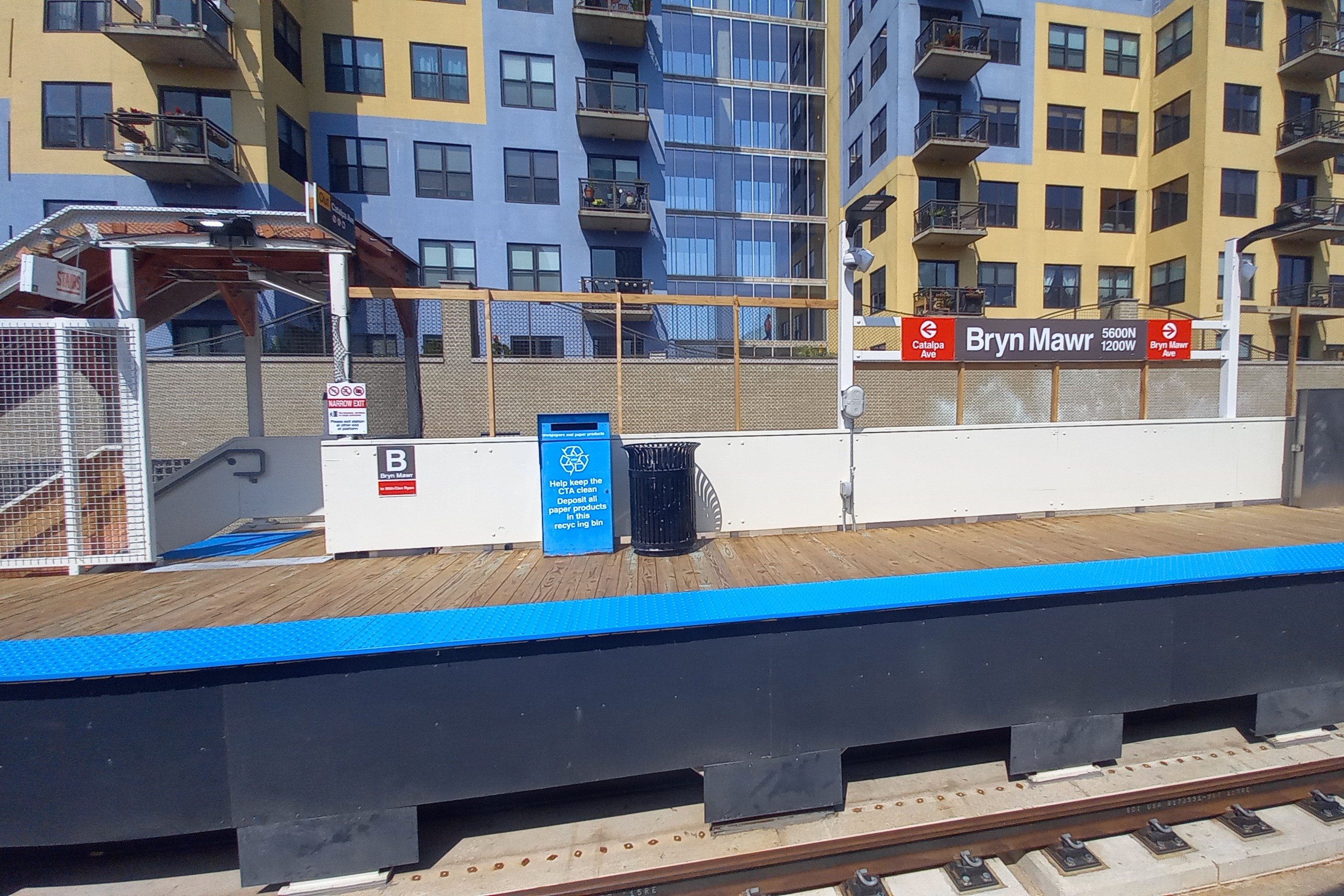
Bryn Mawr station platform during Stage B construction, July 2023

The project was divided into two stages, each of which involved temporarily rerouting trains onto a pair of tracks. The CTA constructed interlockings near Montrose and Thorndale Avenues in preparation for stage A. The CTA also constructed temporary station facilities for Argyle and Bryn Mawr stations; Lawrence and Berwyn stations were anticipated to be closed throughout two stages of construction. Due to a physically constrained construction area, the new viaduct was constructed out of precast segmental box girders using a launching gantry.

Stage A began on May 16, 2021, with the closure of Lawrence and Berwyn stations and the opening of temporary station facilities at Argyle and Bryn Mawr stations. Trains were rerouted onto the two westernmost tracks to make way for the replacement of the two easternmost tracks.

Stage A construction concluded on July 28, 2023, with the beginning of Stage B. Trains were rerouted onto two newly rebuilt tracks while construction began on the two westernmost tracks. Argyle station was relocated to Foster Avenue and Winona Street; Bryn Mawr station became only accessible to or from 95th-bound Red Line trains. Construction on permanent station facilities at Lawrence, Argyle, Berwyn, and Bryn Mawr stations began.

These permanent facilities opened on July 20, 2025.

==== Public space ====
The replacement of embankment tracks opened up ten blocks of public space below the rail line. In 2024, during construction, the CTA held a series of public meetings on the new public space and its potential amenities. The design for the space was finalized in February 2025 with the addition of a footpath, parking spaces, and recreational amenities. Construction on the space is slated to occur from 2026 to 2027.

=== Red-Purple Bypass ===
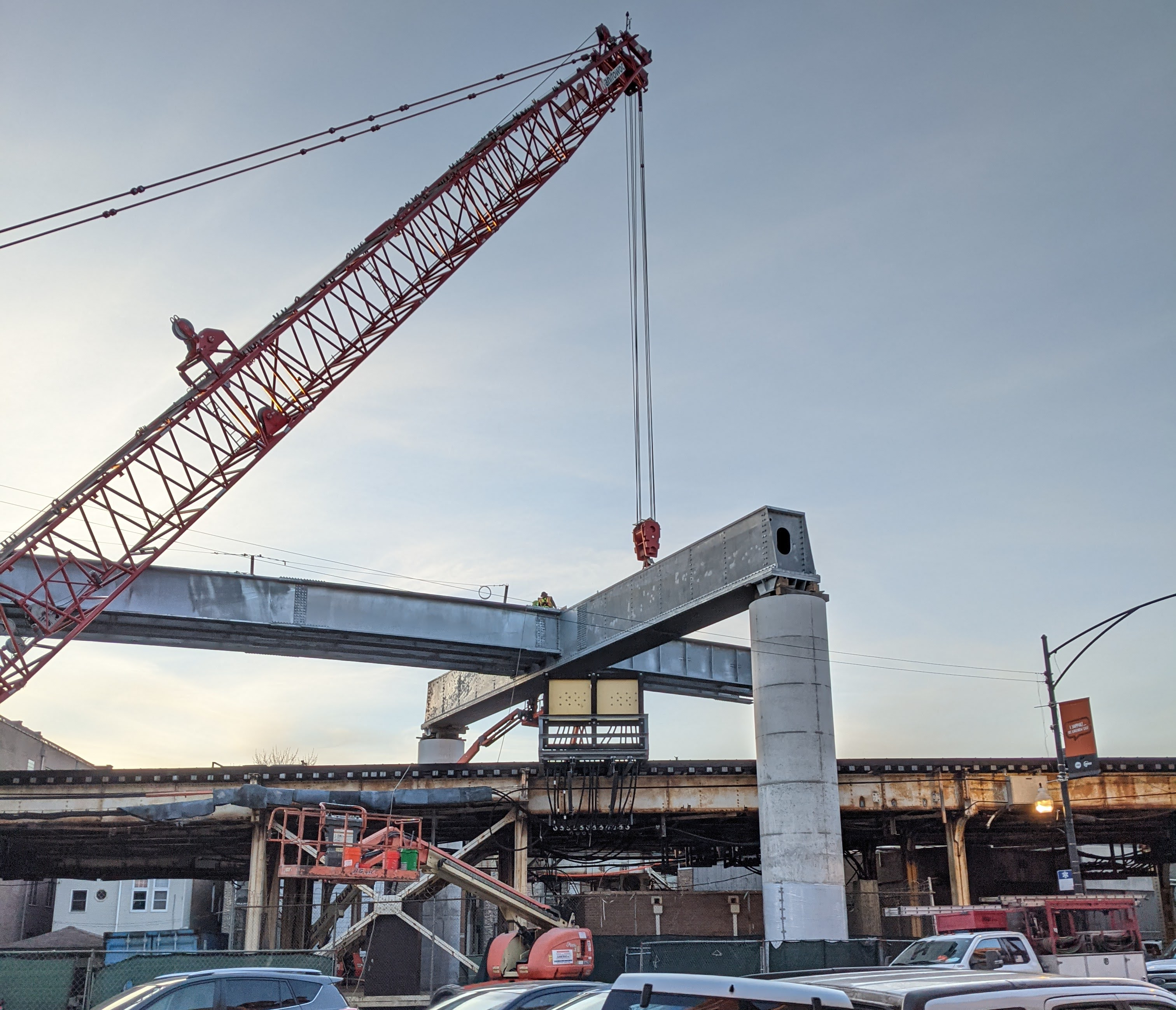
Brown Line flyover ramp during its construction, January 2021

Before the project, Clark Junction was a level junction, which required northbound Brown Line trains to cross main line tracks at grade.

The Red-Purple Bypass Project called for a 45-foot-high (14 m) Brown Line flyover ramp as well as a straighter alignment on the main line north of Belmont. The flyover was constructed out of steel plate girders, while the new main line viaduct was largely constructed out of precast prestressed concrete girders. With the exception of the straddle bent, which spans above the main line, the concrete piers for the flyover have decorative groove marks.

Construction began in 2019 with the installation of a flyover ramp. The flyover opened to Brown Line service on the early morning of November 19, 2021. On March 3, 2022, inspectors reported concrete spalling on the flyover walls as a result of frost weathering. Although the structural integrity of the flyover remained intact, these damages were fully repaired in December 2022.

In August 2021, the Vautravers Building was moved westward to make way for straightening the main line north of Belmont. Construction on the new alignment began in late 2021. The two westernmost tracks were rebuilt first, reopening to service in December 2023. The two easternmost tracks were then closed for reconstruction until May 2025.

== Future phases ==
The CTA is currently studying the rest of the phases surrounding the Evanston branch and the remaining segments of the North Side main line from Addison to Sheridan and from Thorndale to Howard. The RPM Next Phases Study was conducted from 2021 to 2024. Several public meetings were held: two in March 2023, one in November 2023, and one in February 2024.

The project timeline is currently undetermined due to a lack of federal funding. In October 2025, at the start of the 2025 United States federal government shutdown, Office of Management and Budget director Russell Vought withheld a combined $2.1 billion for the Red Line Extension and the Red and Purple Modernization Project, citing reports of diversity, equity, and inclusion practices that he described as "unconstitutional".

== See also ==
- Brown Line Capacity Expansion Project – reconstruction project on the Brown Line in the 2000s
- Red Line Extension – large-scale project on the Red Line as part of the Red Ahead program

== General references ==
- Borzo, Greg (2007). The Chicago "L". Arcadia Publishing. ISBN 978-0-7385-5100-5.
