= Red Ahead =

Modernization and extension of the Chicago 'L' Red Line

Overview
- Status: Under construction
- Locale: Chicago, Illinois, United States

Service
- Type: Rapid transit
- System: Chicago 'L'
- Services: Red Line; Purple Line
- Operator: Chicago Transit Authority

Technical
- Track gauge: 4 ft 8 1/2 in (1,435 mm)

In the spring of 2012, Chicago Transit Authority started a station and track rehabilitation program dubbed "Red Ahead," beginning on the North Side Main Line, which is called the "Red North" project. The program monitors the full route of the Red Line, which does not include the stations of Loyola, Bryn Mawr, Sheridan, or Wilson. Stations between Wilson through Fullerton, and the State Street subway, are also not included. In May 2012, the CTA started to work on the North Side Main Line stations which includes Jarvis, Morse, Granville, Thorndale, Berwyn, Argyle, and Lawrence. This project started in June 2012 and completed in December 2012. This project is also part of the Red Ahead's "Red and Purple Modernization Phase One Project."

== Red North Project ==
In November 2011, the CTA announced the Red North Project as part of the Red Line Capital Investment. The cost of the project was $86 million with a $57.4 million contract granted to contractor Kiewit Infrastructure. The project included the renovation of seven stations: Granville, Morse, Thorndale, Argyle, Berwyn, Lawrence, and Jarvis. The project started on June 1, 2012 at Granville and finished its renovation on December 13, 2012 at Jarvis. The project also included the elimination of slow zones in which trains were forced to travel at reduced speeds due to sub-optimal track conditions.

== Red and Purple Modernization Phase One Project ==
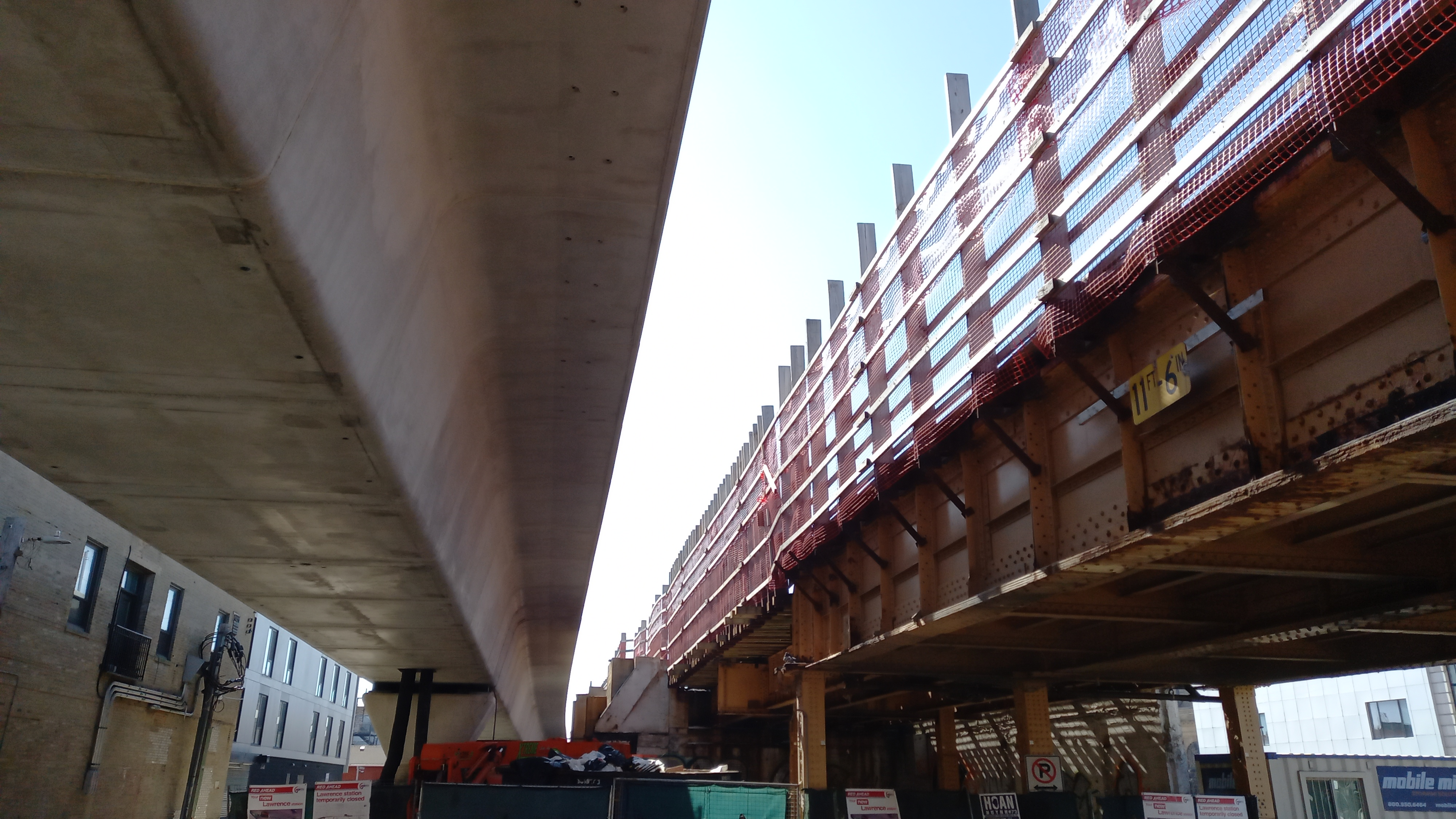
The project replaces embankment tracks (right) with elevated box girder tracks (left), located under the temporarily closed Lawrence station

This project completely rebuilt the Lawrence, Argyle, Berwyn, and Bryn Mawr stations and constructed a new Red-Purple Bypass. Construction on the project began on October 2, 2019, and was completed on July 20, 2025. Funding for this $2.1 billion project was secured in January 2017. Construction of the Lawrence through Bryn Mawr modernization began on May 16, 2021.

== Red Line South Reconstruction Project ==
On May 19, 2013, at 2 a.m., the Dan Ryan branch closed as part of the Red Line South Reconstruction project, which cost $425 million. Track conditions were causing Red Line riders to experience longer travel times, crowded trains and unreliable service. The tracks had extensive repairs over a five-month period with full closure, as opposed to four years had construction been limited to weekends. This project improved commute times, faster rides, and overall passenger experience. As part of the project, the Garfield, 63rd, and 87th stations were renovated and equipped with an elevator, making all Dan Ryan branch stations ADA (Americans with Disabilities Act) compliant. During the closure, Red Line trains were rerouted on the South Side Elevated to Ashland/63rd, while all Green Line trains went to Cottage Grove with some evening rush hour trains terminating at the Loop. A free shuttle bus system was implemented from Garfield to the Dan Ryan stations south of 63rd Street and from Roosevelt to Cermak-Chinatown. The newly reconstructed Dan Ryan branch and the nine stations reopened on October 20, 2013 at 4 a.m.

== Red Line Extension Project ==
The Red Line Extension is a rapid transit extension project that will extend the Red Line south from the 95th/Dan Ryan station to the future 130th station. Construction should last from 2026 until 2030, with the project costing $5.7 billion. The project began on April 24, 2026.
