= Chicago and Evanston Railroad =

Rail line in Illinois, United States

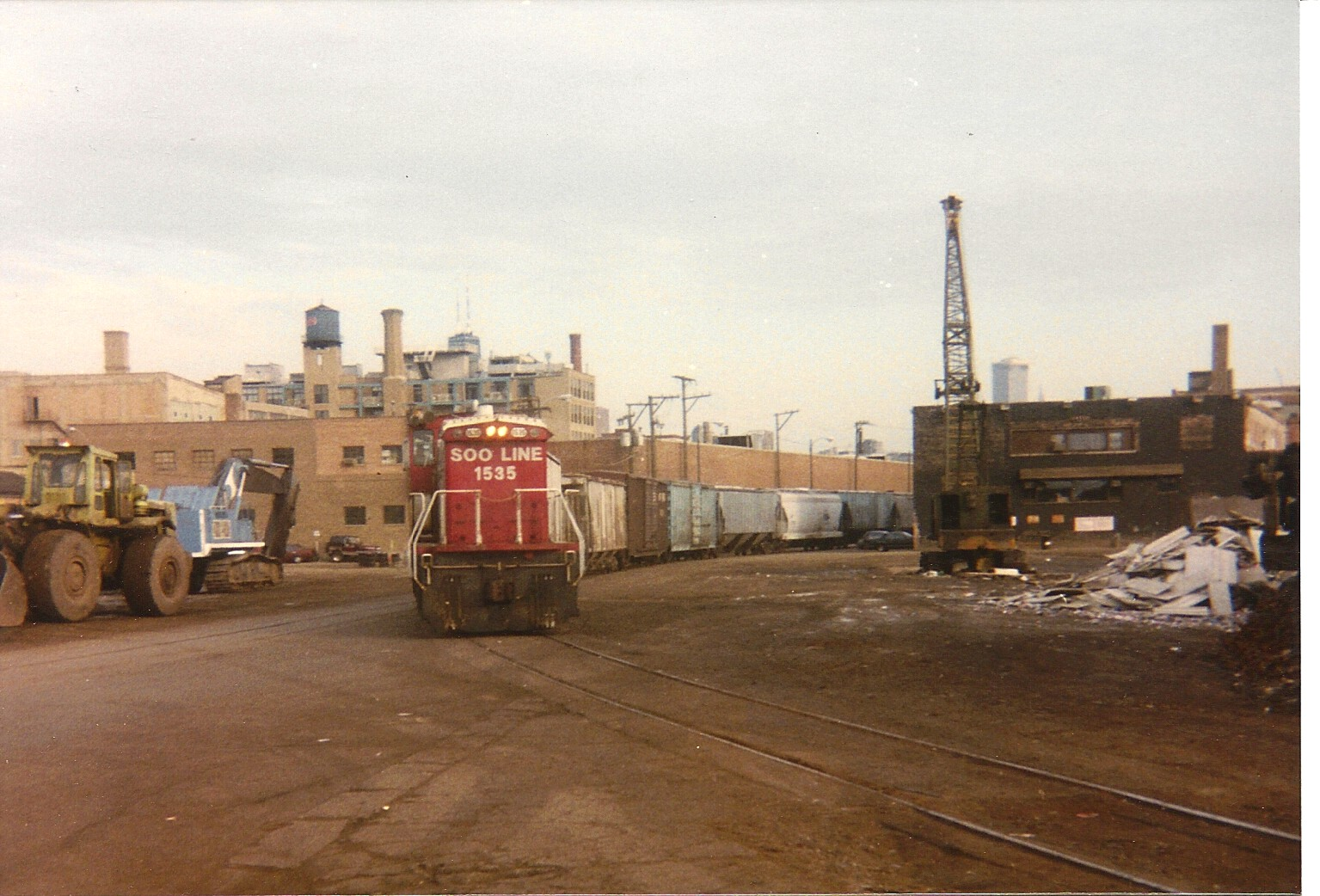
- Soo Line Railroad (SOO) train curving from the C&E to the Bloomingdale Line, 1991

Overview
- Status: Abandoned; partially ceded to the CTA and the CTM
- Owner: Milwaukee Road (later SOO)
- Locale: Chicago–Wilmette, Illinois
- Termini: Chicago Union Station; Llewellyn Park
- Stations: 22 (pre-1908)

Service
- Type: Commuter rail (pre-1917); Freight rail

History
- Opened: May 1, 1885
- Commuter rail truncated: May 16, 1908
- Commuter rail closed: June 1917
- Closed: see § Abandonment

Technical
- Line length: 13.59 mi (21.87 km)

The Chicago and Evanston Railroad (C&E), later the Evanston Division of Milwaukee Road, was a rail line in Chicago, Evanston, and Wilmette, Illinois. The northern half of the line became part of the North Side main line and the Evanston branch on the Chicago "L". The southern half was incrementally abandoned since the 1970s. From 2007 to 2019, the Chicago Terminal Railroad assumed the remaining section of the C&E between Division Street and Diversey Parkway. In 2019, the City of Chicago acquired the abandoned rail track.

The C&E right-of-way along Lakewood Avenue is colloquially called the Lakewood Line among railfans.

== History ==
=== Early history ===
Although the Chicago and Milwaukee Railroad (later a part of C&NW) provided passenger service between Chicago and Evanston, there was a need to provide alternative service between the two cities. In 1861, a charter was given to the Chicago and Evanston Railroad; however, the line began operation on May 1, 1885, after many years of funding and land acquisition issues.

Initially, the line ran from the intersection of Chicago Avenue and Larrabee Street to Calvary station at the eponymous cemetery. On May 20, service was extended to Kinzie Street at Kingsbury Street near the C&NW's Wells Street Station. In June, the line was extended further south to Chicago Union Station by crossing over the North Branch Chicago River and intersecting at-grade with C&NW tracks. By August 1886, the line was extended north to Church Street. By the end of 1888, the line was extended further north to Llewellyn Park (now Wilmette). Infill stations were constructed through the rest of the 19th century: Edgewater station, Birchwood station, North Edgewater station, and Sheridan Park station.

The line went through a few ownership changes. On December 31, 1885, the Chicago and Evanston Railroad was merged with the Chicago and Lake Superior Railroad—the latter company was formed on October 6, 1883—to form the Chicago, Evanston and Lake Superior Railway. The combined company was eventually acquired by the Chicago, Milwaukee and St. Paul Railway in April 1900.

=== Chicago "L" ===
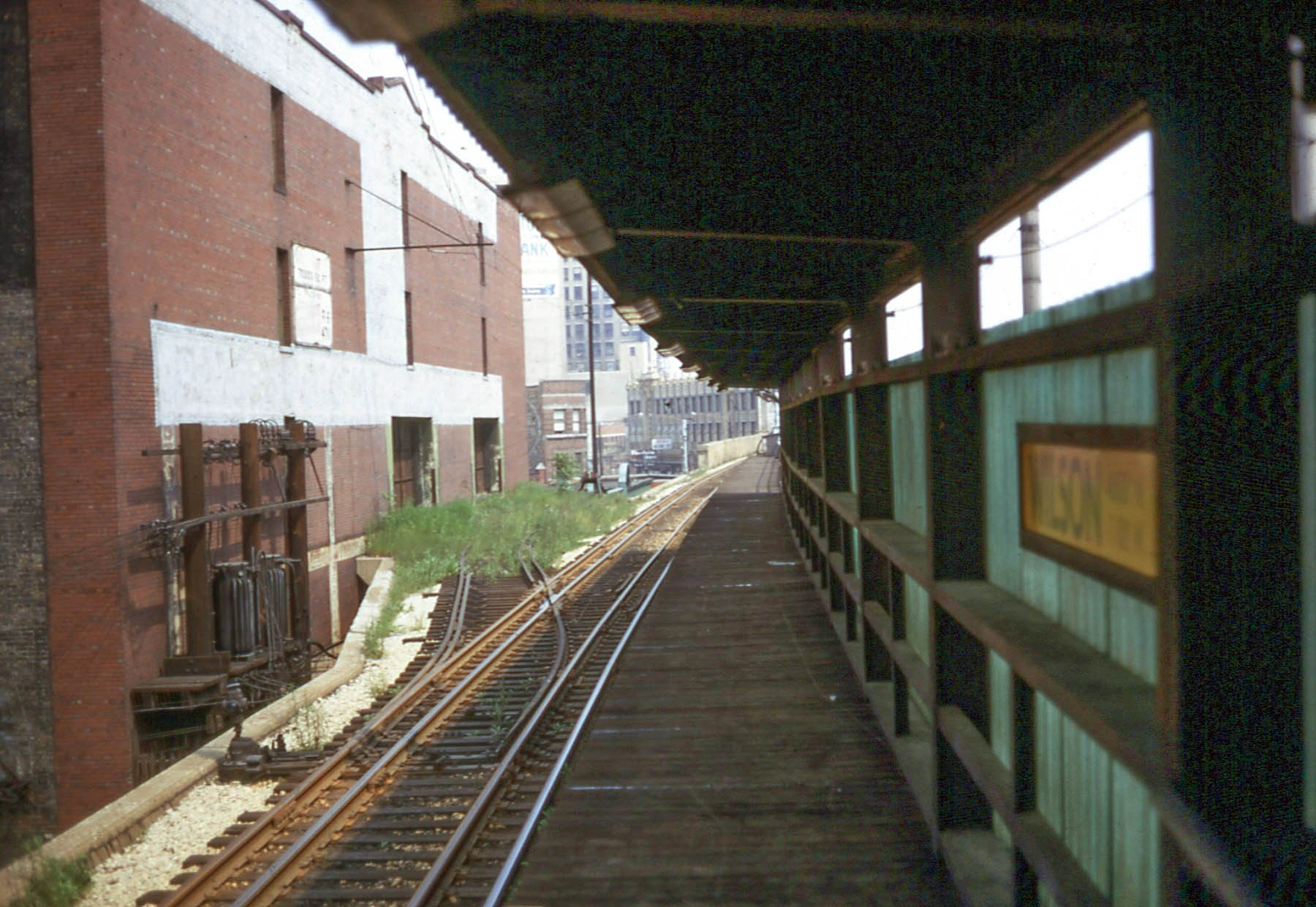
Gauntlet track, as shown at Wilson station in 1968, was used by trains of both the C&E and the Chicago "L"

On May 31, 1900, the Northwestern Elevated Railroad, part of the Chicago "L", opened the North Side main line from the Loop Elevated to Wilson station. Consequently, service on the C&E was reduced from 54 trains to 14 rush-hour trains. On May 16, 1908, the elevated railroad company extended its main line north from Wilson station to Central station along the existing C&E tracks. The extension replaced commuter service along the C&E except for a section south of Sheridan Park/Wilson; commuter service as a whole was eventually discontinued in 1917. The extension was electrified using overhead wire and a section between Wilson and Lawrence was embanked.

Within the next two decades, more stations were constructed on the "L": Loyola and Howard stations in 1908, Linden station in 1912, Thorndale station in 1915, Edgewater Beach station in 1916, Lawrence station in 1923, and South Boulevard station in 1931 (replacing Calvary "L" station). Furthermore, the section between Wilson and Isabella was being elevated piecemeal along an embankment structure, which was completed in 1931.

In 1953, the Chicago Transit Authority bought out the C&E right of way north of Montrose Avenue.

=== Freight service ===
After passenger service on the C&E ceased in 1917, freight trains continued to use the line. Earlier in 1907, the Northwestern Elevated Railroad Company made an agreement with Milwaukee Road to operate "L" service to Evanston, which opened in 1908. Under the agreement, the company and later its successors (the Chicago Rapid Transit Company and later the Chicago Transit Authority) assumed the role of providing freight service along the extension, with Milwaukee Road covering the expenses of freight; this assumption of freight service occurred in 1920. Because both "L" and heavy freight trains share tracks north of Wilson, the North Side main line was on an embankment structure, rather than a typical elevated structure present throughout the "L". Gauntlet tracks were added to avoid crashing into freight trains, station platforms, and third rails.

=== Abandonment ===
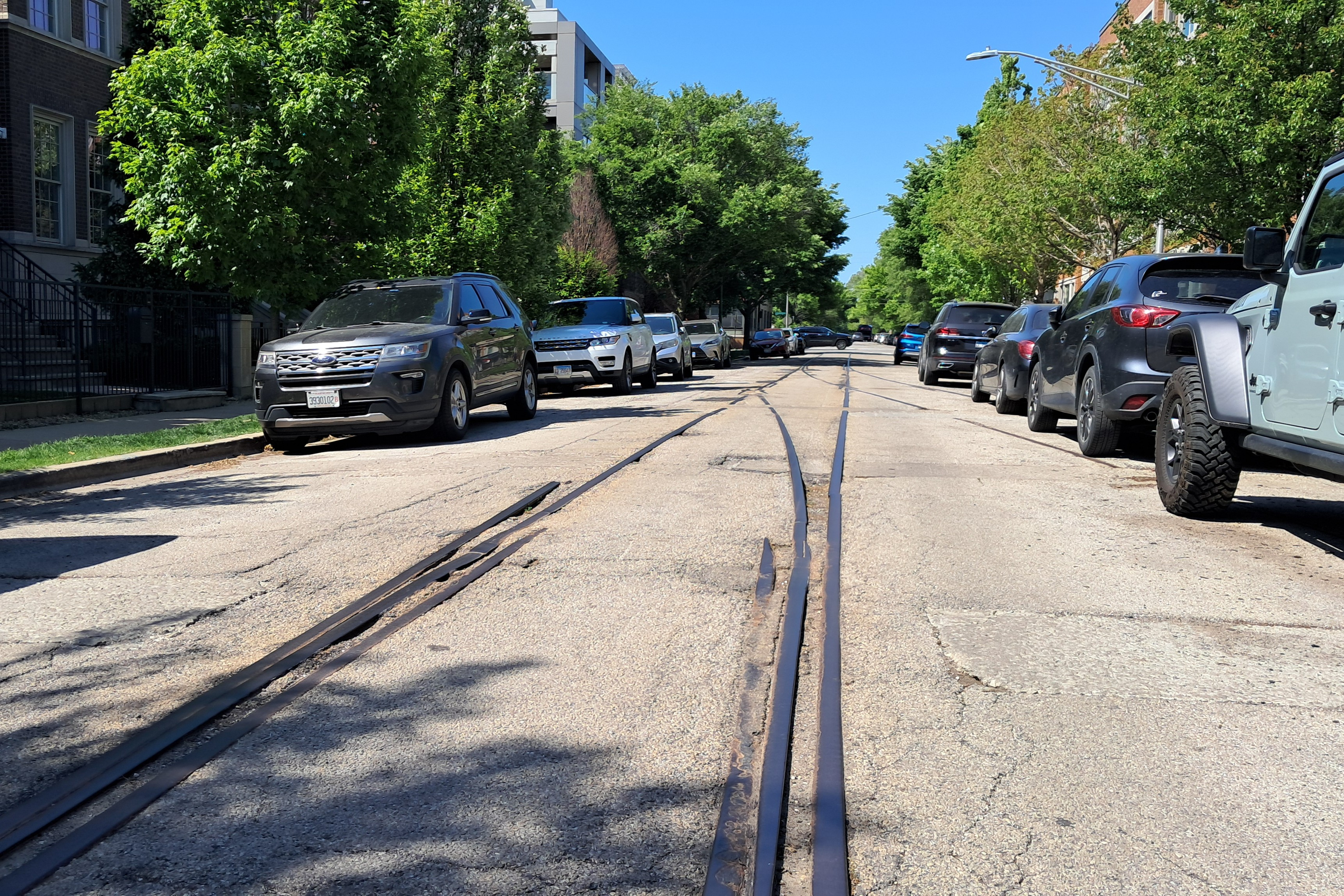
Abandoned C&E track along Lakewood Avenue, May 2026

In the second half of the 20th century, the demand for freight rail service was declining. In the case of the C&E, freight service was incrementally being cut as the number of customers decreased. On April 30, 1973, with Lill Coal Company being the last freight customer on the "L", freight service on the "L" ended. In many years since, more sections of the C&E were removed, including a river crossing to/from Chicago Union Station (demolished in 1973) and much of the street-running track.

In 1985, the Soo Line Railroad (now a subsidiary of the CPKC Railway) acquired the bankrupt Milwaukee Road, including its Evanston Division (C&E). In 2007, the Chicago Terminal Railroad (CTM) acquired the remaining segment of the C&E between Division Street and Diversey Parkway. In 2010, the City of Chicago requested an adverse abandonment on the Kingsbury Street section between the Halsted Street/Division Street intersection and Willow Street as well as the Lakewood Avenue section between Clybourn Avenue and Diversey Parkway. The track south of North Avenue was removed in 2012 as part of a beautification project along Kingsbury Street. The City of Chicago eventually acquired the C&E tracks from CTM in 2019 after the latter ceased operation a year earlier. In December 2024, a track segment along Lakewood Avenue between Wrightwood and Schubert avenues was dismantled to replace the underground sewer main.

=== Remnants ===
The C&E's right of way is fairly visible in the neighborhoods of Lincoln Park and Lake View.

The North Side main line uses two different methods of elevation. Historically, south of Wilson, the line ran along an elevated structure akin to most old elevated lines on the "L". North of Wilson, the line ran along an embankment as it originally had to accommodate heavy freight trains too. In the 2010s and the 2020s, long after freight service ceased on the "L", the Red and Purple Modernization Phase One Project replaced a section of embankment structure with an elevated box girder structure.

Before Wilson station was rebuilt from 2015 to 2017, the station had an unusual track configuration whereby the southbound express track briefly shifted away from the main line before returning. This shift was designed so that freight trains along the C&E can enter or exit the North Side main line.

== Route ==
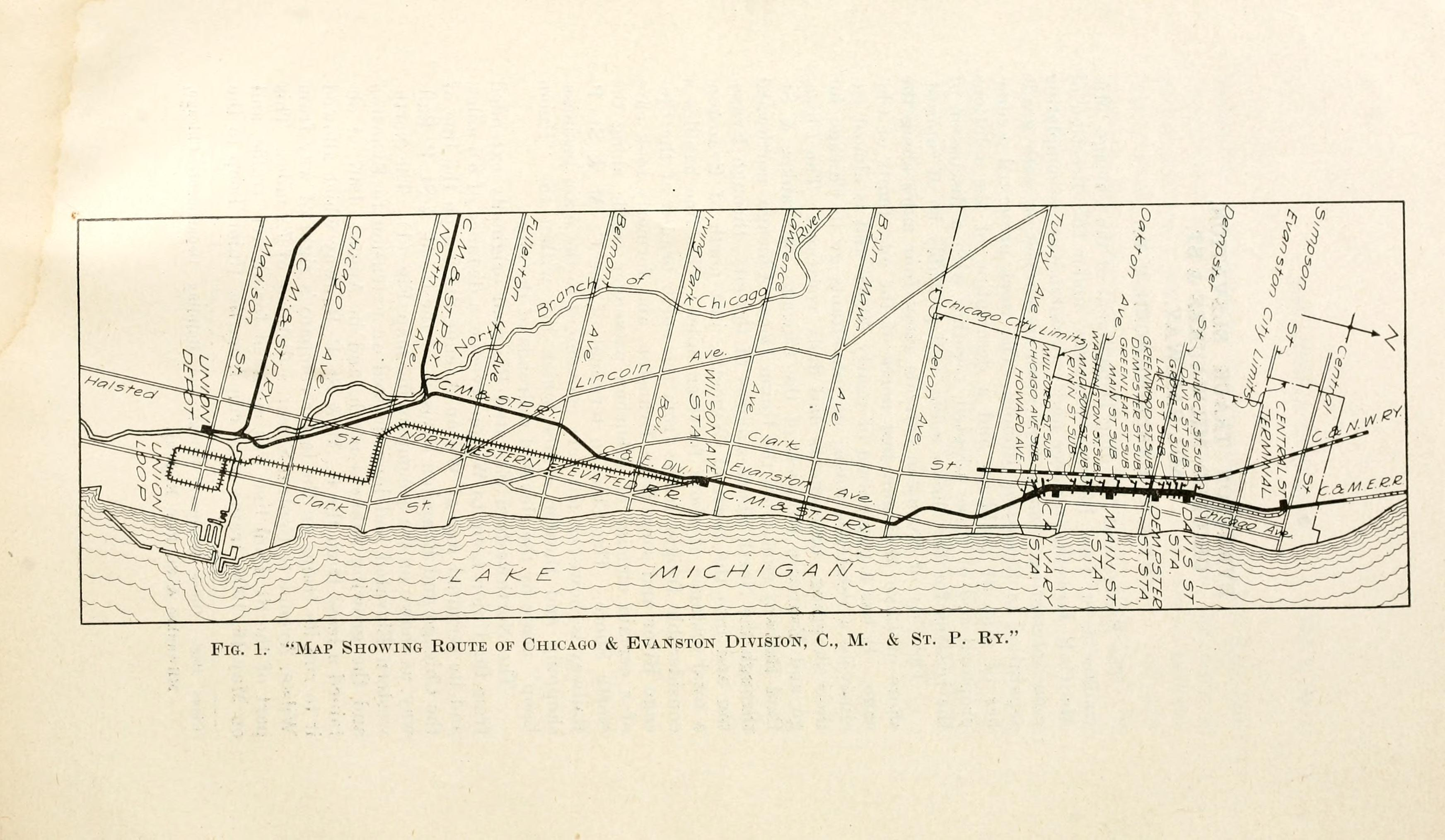
Map of the C&E and the North Side main line

At its greatest extent, the C&E began at Chicago Union Station and crossed the North Branch Chicago River north of Kinzie Street. The line then traveled northwest along Kingsbury Street and then north along Lakewood Avenue. North of Belmont Avenue, the line traveled north-northeast and then north past Wrigley Field. The line traveled north alongside Seminary Avenue before being sandwiched in between Graceland Cemetery and the North Side main line. From Wilson onwards, the line traveled north all the way to Wilmette via the North Side main line and the Evanston branch (today's Purple Line).

The segment along Lakewood Avenue is also called the Lakewood Line among railfans.

== See also ==
- Chicago North Shore and Milwaukee Railroad, also known as the North Shore Line
- Purple Line (CTA) and Red Line (CTA), parallel rapid transit lines on the Chicago "L"
- Union Pacific North Line, a parallel Metra commuter line operated on Union Pacific (ex-C&NW) tracks
