= Argyle station (CTA) =

Chicago "L" station

Argyle 5000N 1200W
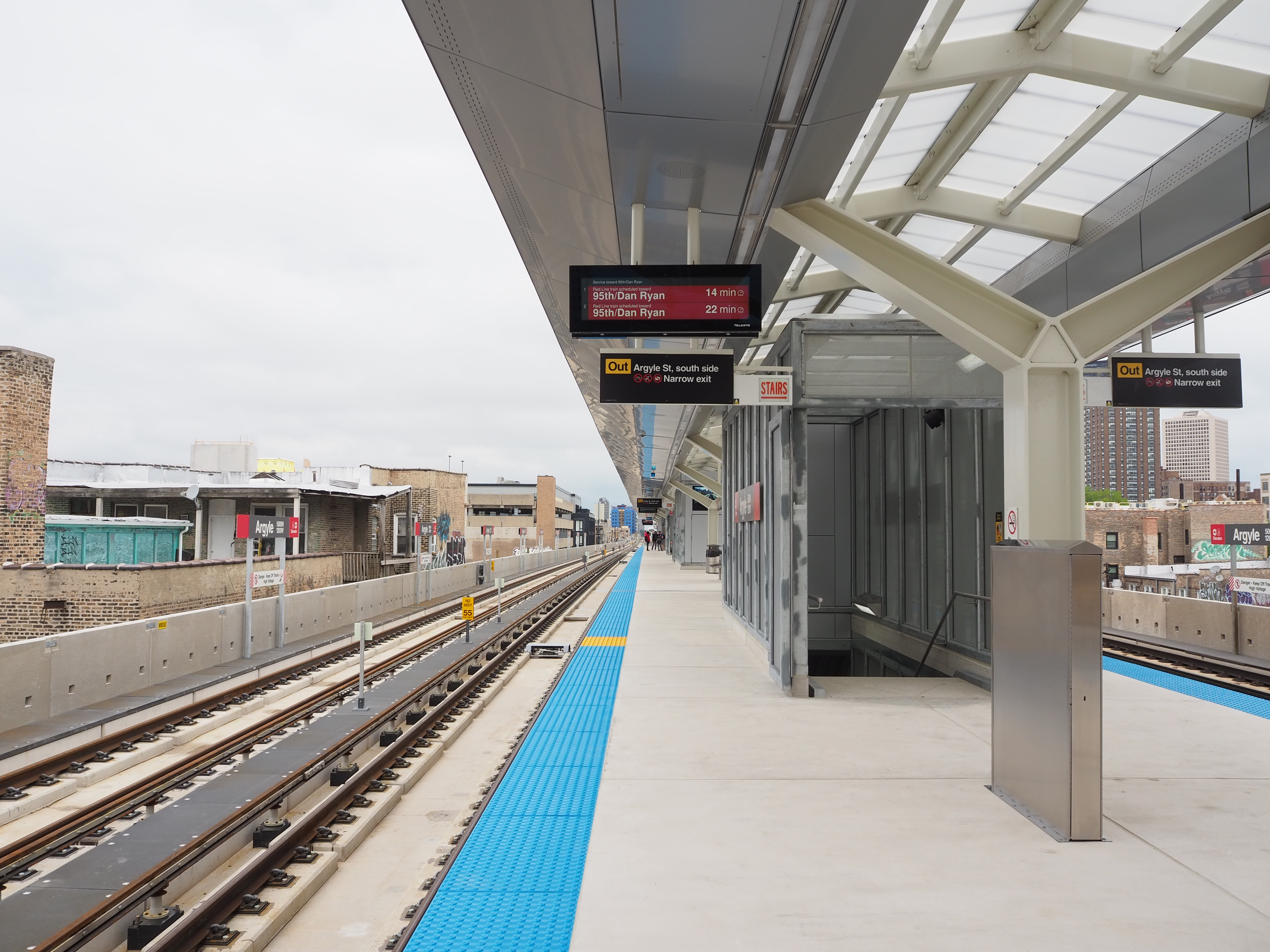
- Rebuilt platform on opening day

General information
- Location: 1118 West Argyle Street; Chicago, Illinois 60640
- Coordinates: 41.973365°N 87.658561°W
- Owner: Chicago Transit Authority
- Line: North Side Main Line
- Platforms: 1 Island platform
- Tracks: 4

Construction
- Structure type: Elevated
- Parking: No
- Cycle facilities: Yes
- Accessible: Yes

History
- Opened: Chicago & Evanston Railroad: May 21, 1885; 141 years ago Northwestern Elevated Railroad: May 16, 1908; 118 years ago
- Rebuilt: 1921, 2012, 2021–25
- Former names: Argyle Park

Passengers
- 2025: 826,578 ▼8.4%

Services
Preceding station	Chicago "L"	Following station
Berwyn toward Howard	Red Line	Lawrence toward 95th/Dan Ryan
Purple Line does not stop here
Former services
Preceding station	Milwaukee Road	Following station
Edgewater toward Llewellyn Park	Chicago – Evanston	Sheridan Park toward Chicago
Track layout
Location

Argyle is a station on the Chicago Transit Authority's Red Line, located at 1118 West Argyle Street in the Uptown neighborhood of Chicago, Illinois. It is an elevated station with an island platform. Purple Line weekday rush hour express service passes through this station but does not stop.

== Location ==
Argyle is situated on West Argyle Street, close to the intersection with Broadway. The surrounding neighborhood consists of a mixture of commercial and residential areas, and is particularly noted for the high concentration of Vietnamese restaurants, bakeries and shops; as well as Chinese, Cambodian, Laotian, and Thai businesses.

== History ==
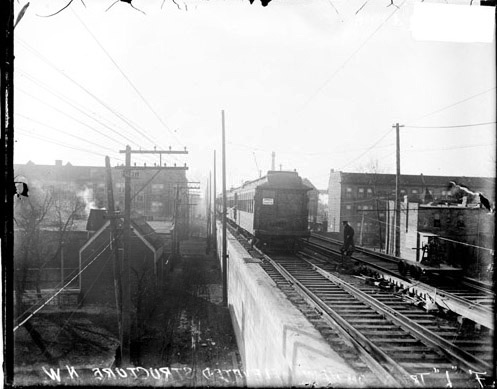
The new embankment at Argyle station in 1916

The site of Argyle station was first used as Argyle Park station on the Chicago and Evanston branch of the Chicago, Milwaukee & St. Paul Railroad route, which opened on May 21, 1885. On opening, the station houses along the route were described as "attractive frame structures built in the Gothic and Queen Anne styles."

In 1908, the Northwestern Elevated Railroad was extended north from Wilson, using the tracks of the Chicago, Milwaukee & St. Paul Railroad, and a new station was constructed on the site of the previous depot. The station was again rebuilt to a design by architect Charles P. Rawson when the tracks between Wilson and Howard were elevated onto an embankment between 1914 and 1922. In 1979, the station received a $250,000 facelift and, in 1991, a Chinese-style hipped-and-gabled roof was added to the platform canopy. The station was closed for renovation from August 24 to October 5, 2012.

=== Red & Purple Modernization Project ===
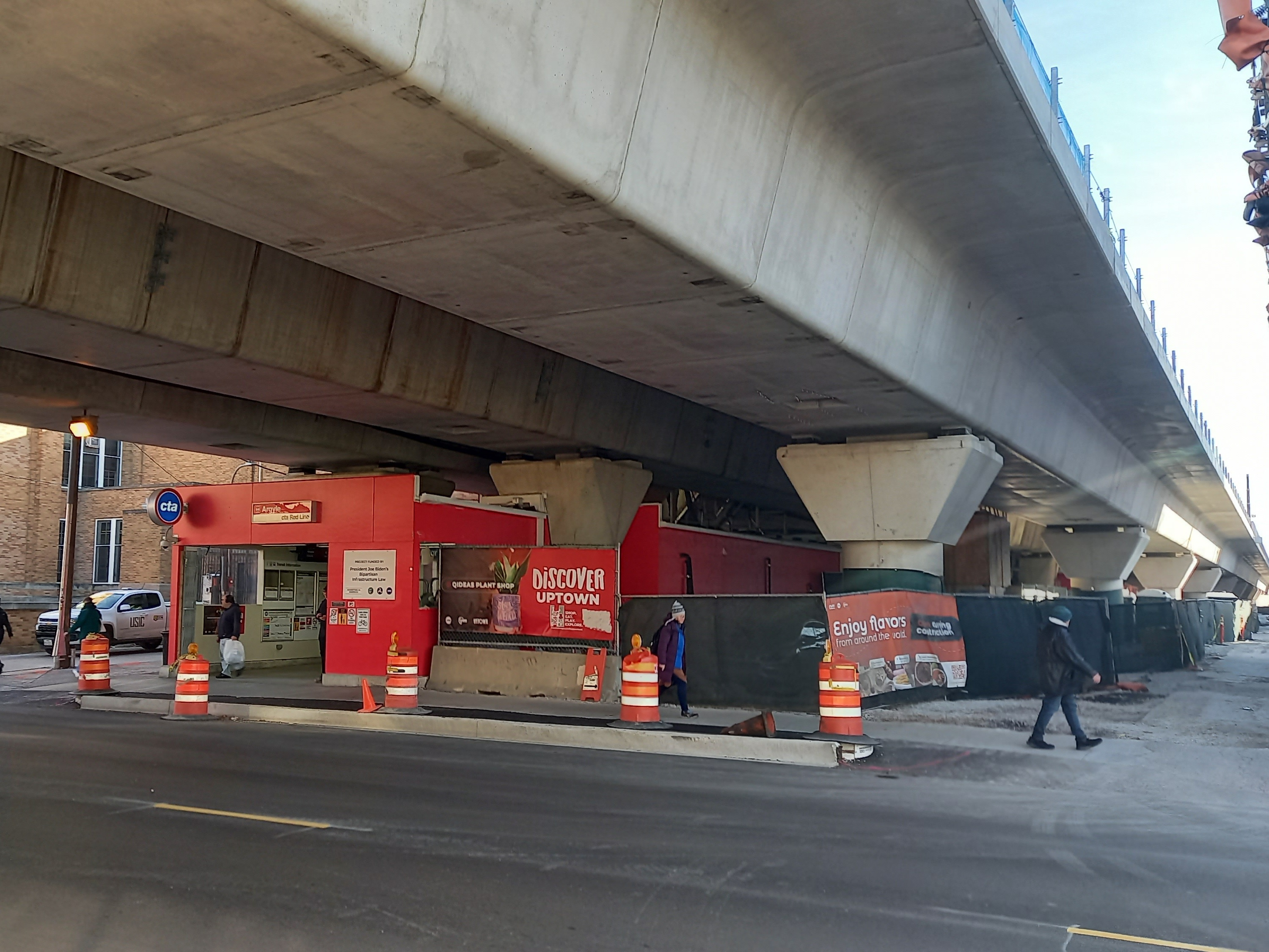
Entrance to temporary Argyle station at Foster Avenue

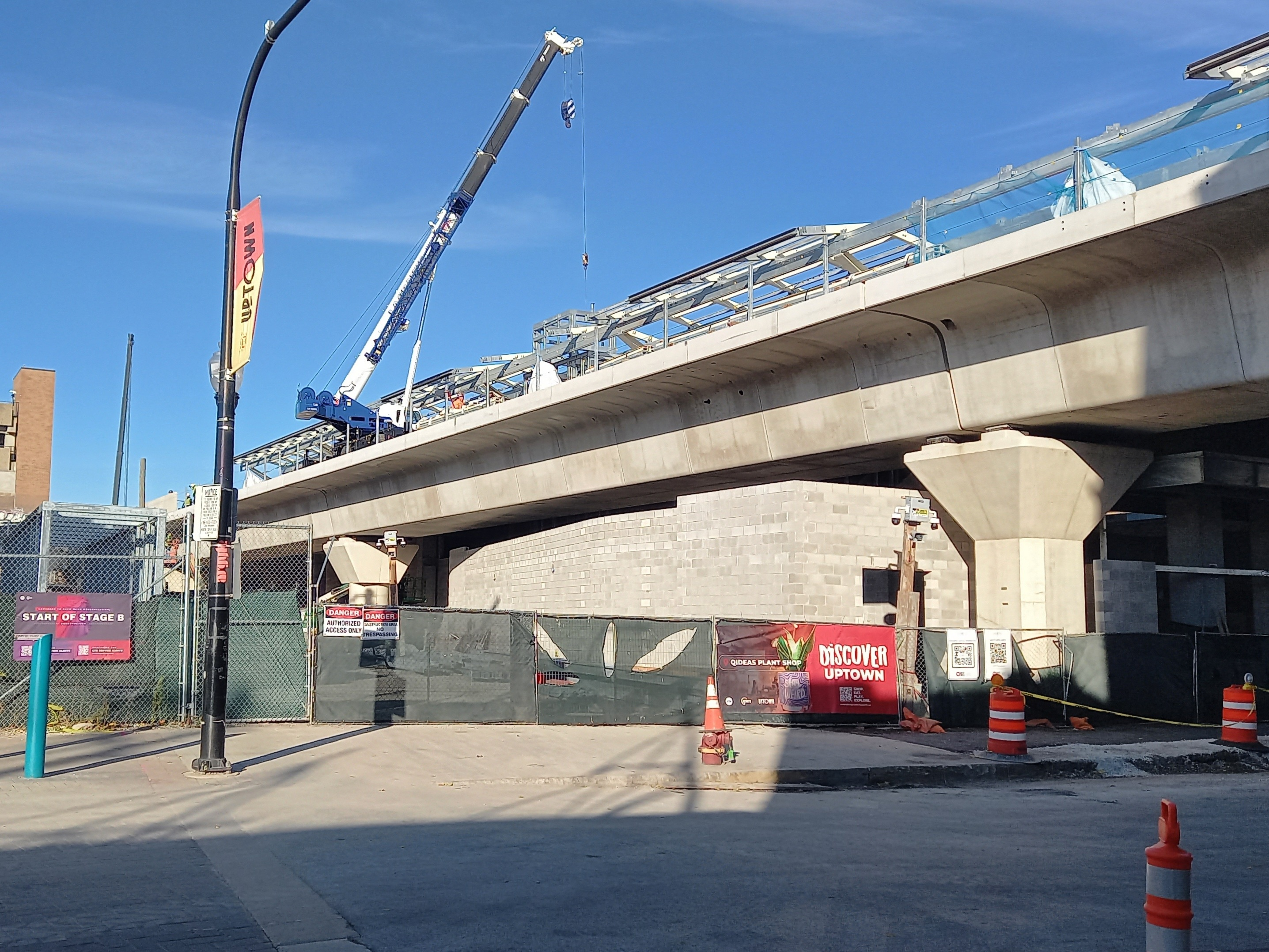
Argyle station under construction (November 2024)

As part of this project, the Argyle station was rebuilt with new signage, lights, security cameras, elevators, and wider platforms. Reconstruction began on May 16, 2021 and was completed on July 20, 2025. During Stage A, the two original northbound tracks were closed permanently, and the main entrance was closed with all northbound trains using what the original southbound Red Line track and platform and all southbound trains using the original southbound Purple Line Express track stopping at a temporary side platform. Purple Line Express trains continued to skip this station in both directions. Unlike a similar reconstruction that happened simultaneously at Bryn Mawr, both platforms used a single temporary entrance, as opposed to one platform using the normal entrance and one platform using a temporary entrance with no connection inside the paid area. After Stage A was completed in 2023, Stage B began, where the station was temporarily relocated a block north to a location between Foster Avenue and Winona Street with an entrance on each street. This time, the temporary station was an island platform located on what would be the new northbound Red Line track, located between what became a completely new pocket track (which had no equivalent on the original structure) immediately to the north of the site of both the original and permanent new stations (which was being used by all southbound trains), and the permanent Purple Line Express northbound track (which was being used by all northbound trains).

== Services ==
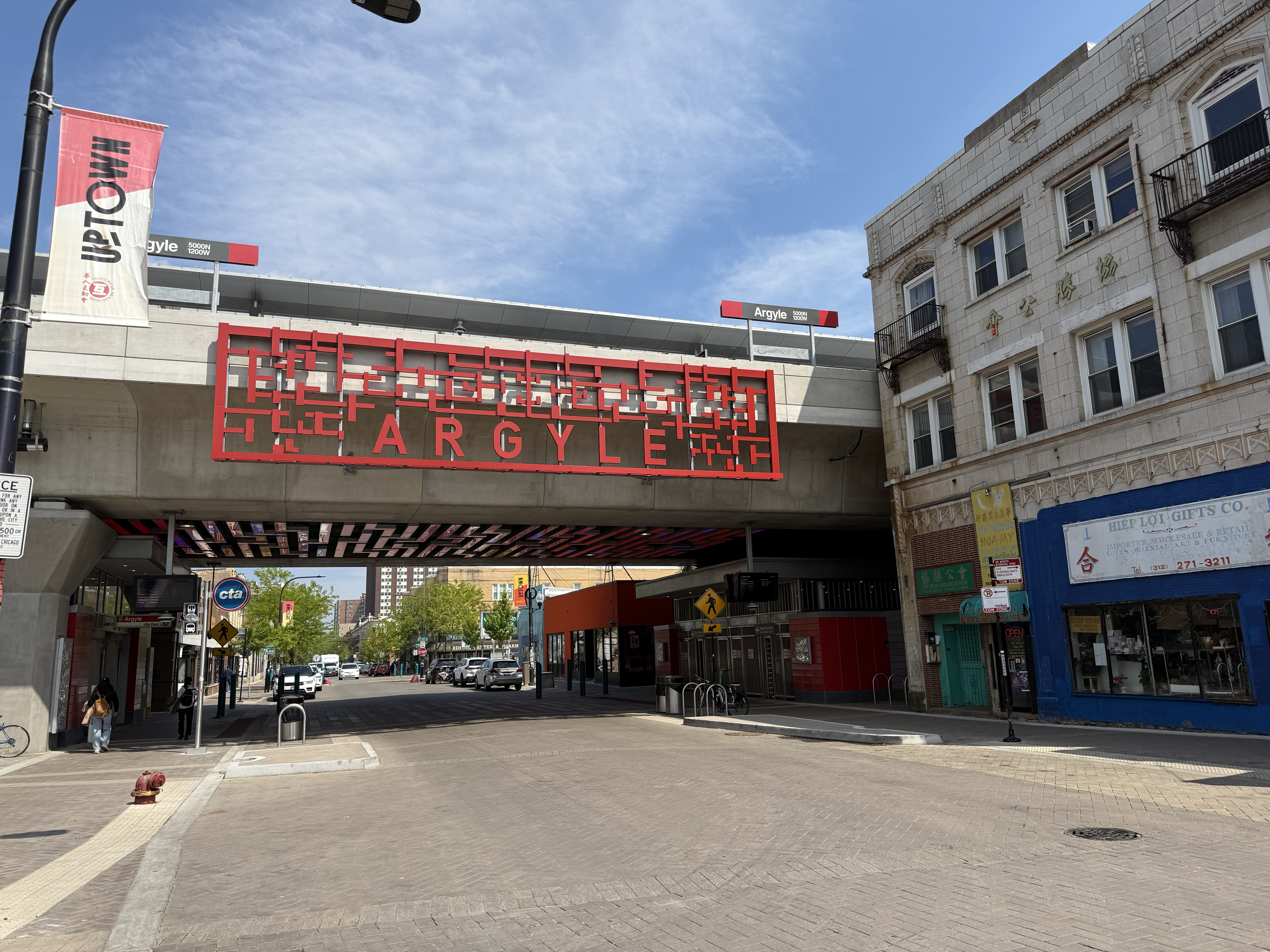
Street-level view of Argyle station, May 2026

Argyle is part of CTA's Red Line, which runs from the northern city limits at Howard Street to downtown Chicago and 95th Street. The station has an island platform on an elevated structure located between Broadway and Winthrop Avenue. It serves the Red Line's two tracks; the northbound track serves trains to Howard, while the southbound track serves trains to 95th. The station entrance was originally located on the north side of Argyle Street, built into the embankment. It is located between the Berwyn and Lawrence stations. Red Line trains serve Argyle 24 hours a day, every day of the year; trains operate roughly every 3 to 9 minutes during rush hour and midday operation, with longer headways of up to 15 minutes at night.

== Bus connections ==
CTA

- 36 Broadway (approximately one half block away on Broadway)
