= Thorndale station (CTA) =

Chicago "L" station

Thorndale 5900N 1200W
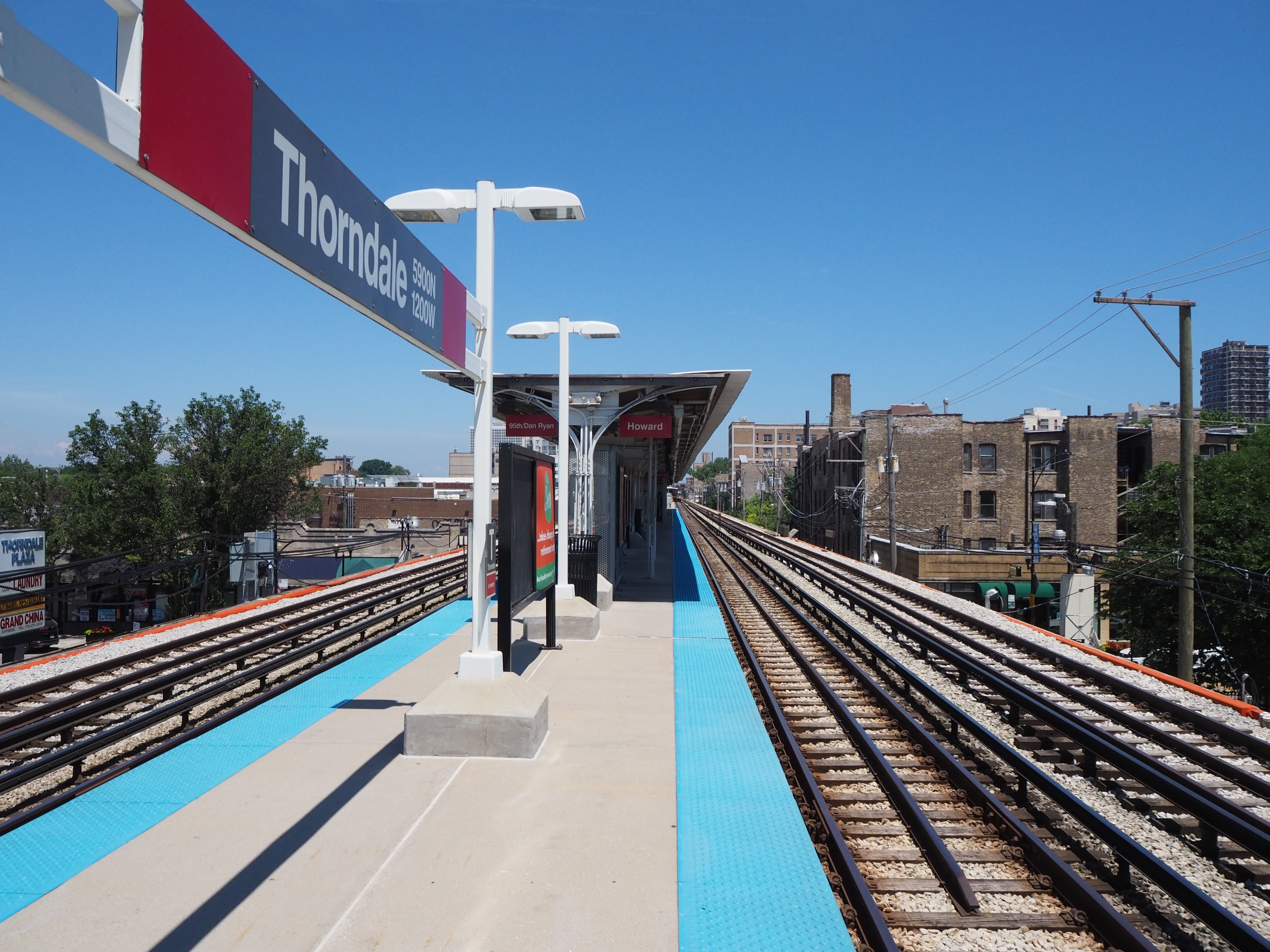

General information
- Location: 1118 West Thorndale Avenue; Chicago, Illinois 60660
- Coordinates: 41.990133°N 87.659082°W
- Owner: Chicago Transit Authority
- Line: North Side Main Line
- Platforms: 1 island platform
- Tracks: 4

Construction
- Structure type: Embankment
- Cycle facilities: Yes
- Accessible: No

History
- Opened: February 14, 1915; 111 years ago
- Rebuilt: 1921, 2012

Passengers
- 2025: 592,449 ▼1.7%

Services
Preceding station	Chicago "L"	Following station
Granville toward Howard	Red Line	Bryn Mawr toward 95th/Dan Ryan
Purple Line does not stop here
Track layout
Location

Thorndale is an 'L' station on the CTA's Red Line. It is located at 1118 West Thorndale Avenue in the Edgewater neighborhood of Chicago, Illinois. The adjacent stations are Granville, located about one quarter mile to the north, and Bryn Mawr, about one half mile to the south. Four tracks pass through the station, but there is only a single island platform in the center of the tracks; Purple Line weekday rush hour express service use the outside tracks but do not stop at this station.

== History ==
A temporary station opened at Thorndale in 1915. This was replaced with a permanent station built to a design by architect Charles P. Rawson in 1921 as part of a project by the Northwestern Elevated Railroad to raise the tracks between Wilson and Howard onto an embankment.

=== Modernization ===
Closure of the Thorndale station (along with Lawrence, and Jarvis on the Red Line and South Boulevard and Foster on the Purple Line) was proposed in three of the CTA's six potential options for the renovation of the Purple Line and northern section of the Red Line. In two plans, the station would be replaced by new auxiliary entrances at Glenlake from Granville and Hollywood from Bryn Mawr. In the third, replacement would be by auxiliary entrances at Elmdale from a new subterranean station at Glenlake and at Hollywood from a new station at Bryn Mawr.

== Bus connections ==
CTA

- 36 Broadway
