= Berwyn station (CTA) =

Chicago "L" station

Berwyn 5300N 1200W
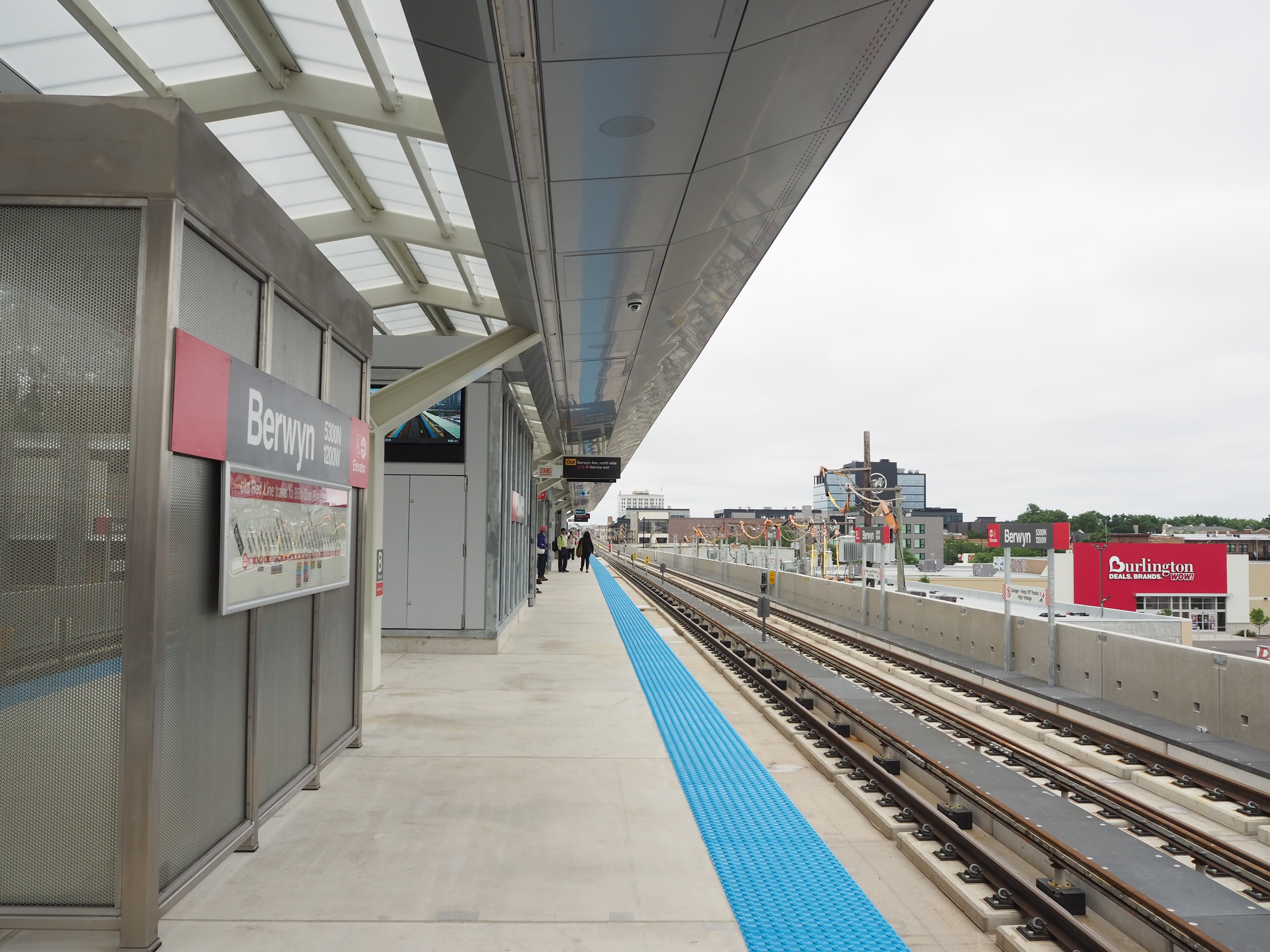
- The rebuilt Berwyn station on opening day

General information
- Location: 1121 West Berwyn Avenue; Chicago, Illinois 60640
- Coordinates: 41.977833°N 87.658683°W
- Owner: Chicago Transit Authority
- Line: North Side Main Line
- Platforms: 1 island platform
- Tracks: 4

Construction
- Structure type: Elevated
- Cycle facilities: Yes
- Accessible: Yes

History
- Opened: 1916; 110 years ago
- Rebuilt: 1921, 2012, 2021–25
- Former names: Edgewater Beach

Passengers
- 2025: 277,796
- Rank: 57 out of 143

Services
Preceding station	Chicago "L"	Following station
Bryn Mawr toward Howard	Red Line	Argyle toward 95th/Dan Ryan
Purple Line does not stop here
Track layout
Location

Berwyn is an 'L' station on the CTA's Red Line. It is located at 1121 West Berwyn Avenue in the Edgewater neighborhood of Chicago, Illinois. The adjacent stations are Bryn Mawr, located about 3/8 mile (0.60 km) to the north, and Argyle, about 1/3 mile (0.54 km) to the south. Four tracks pass through the station, but there is only single island platform in the center of the tracks; Purple Line weekday rush hour express service uses the outside tracks but does not stop at this station. Berwyn is named for the Berwyn station in the community of the same name, which is west of Philadelphia. Many of the roads (and thus CTA stations) in the Edgewater neighborhood are named after stations on the former Pennsylvania Railroad Main Line.

== History ==
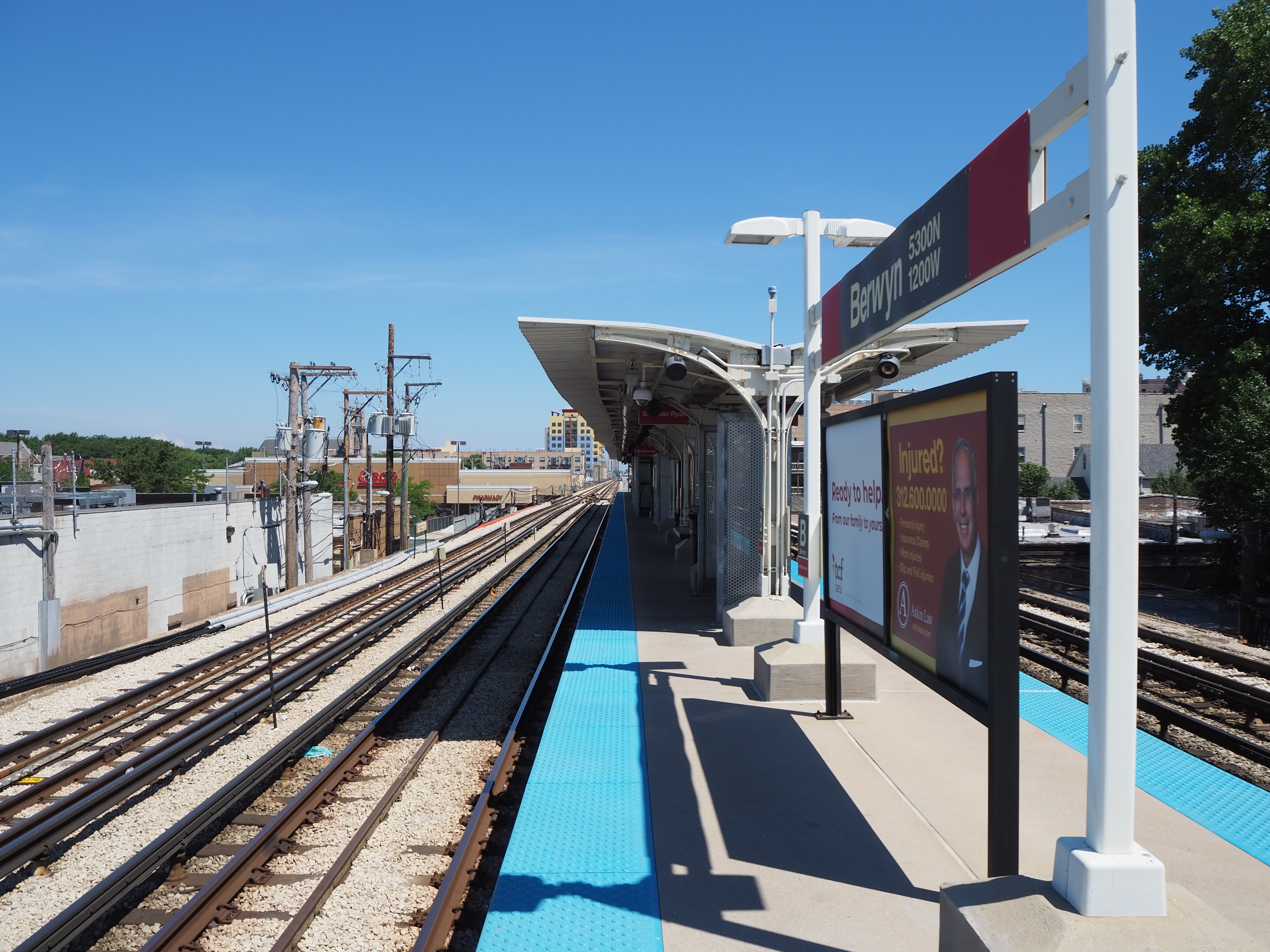
Station platform prior to reconstruction

The Northwestern Elevated Railroad extended its services north from Wilson to Central Street in Evanston in 1908, but they did not build a station at Berwyn Avenue until the tracks between Wilson and Howard were elevated onto an embankment between 1914 and 1922. This new station was built to a design by architect Charles P. Rawson; the date of opening is not known, but a station may have existed at Berwyn by 1916. At the time of its opening the station was named Edgewater Beach Station; the name was changed to Berwyn in the late 1950s, around the time that Lake Shore Drive was extended from Foster Avenue to Hollywood Avenue destroying the namesake Edgewater Beach.

=== Red & Purple Modernization Project ===
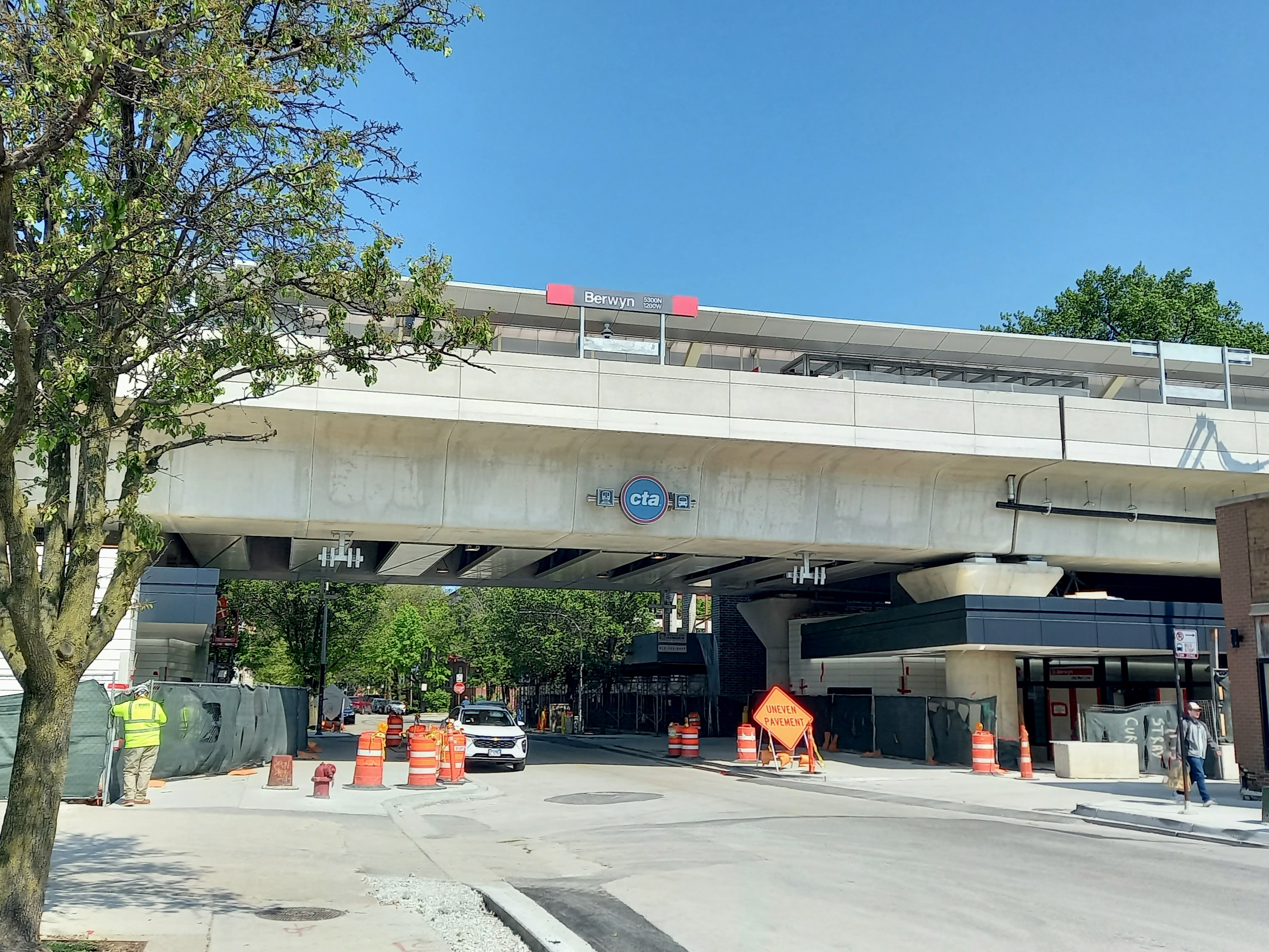
Berwyn station as of May 2025

As part of Phase I of the Red & Purple Modernization Project, the station closed for demolition beginning on May 16, 2021 and a newly constructed station reopened on July 20, 2025. The new station features wider platforms, better lighting, and is now accessible to passengers with disabilities.

== Bus connections ==
CTA

- 92 Foster
- 146 Inner Lake Shore/Michigan Express
