= Bryn Mawr station (CTA) =

Chicago "L" station

Bryn Mawr 5600N 1200W
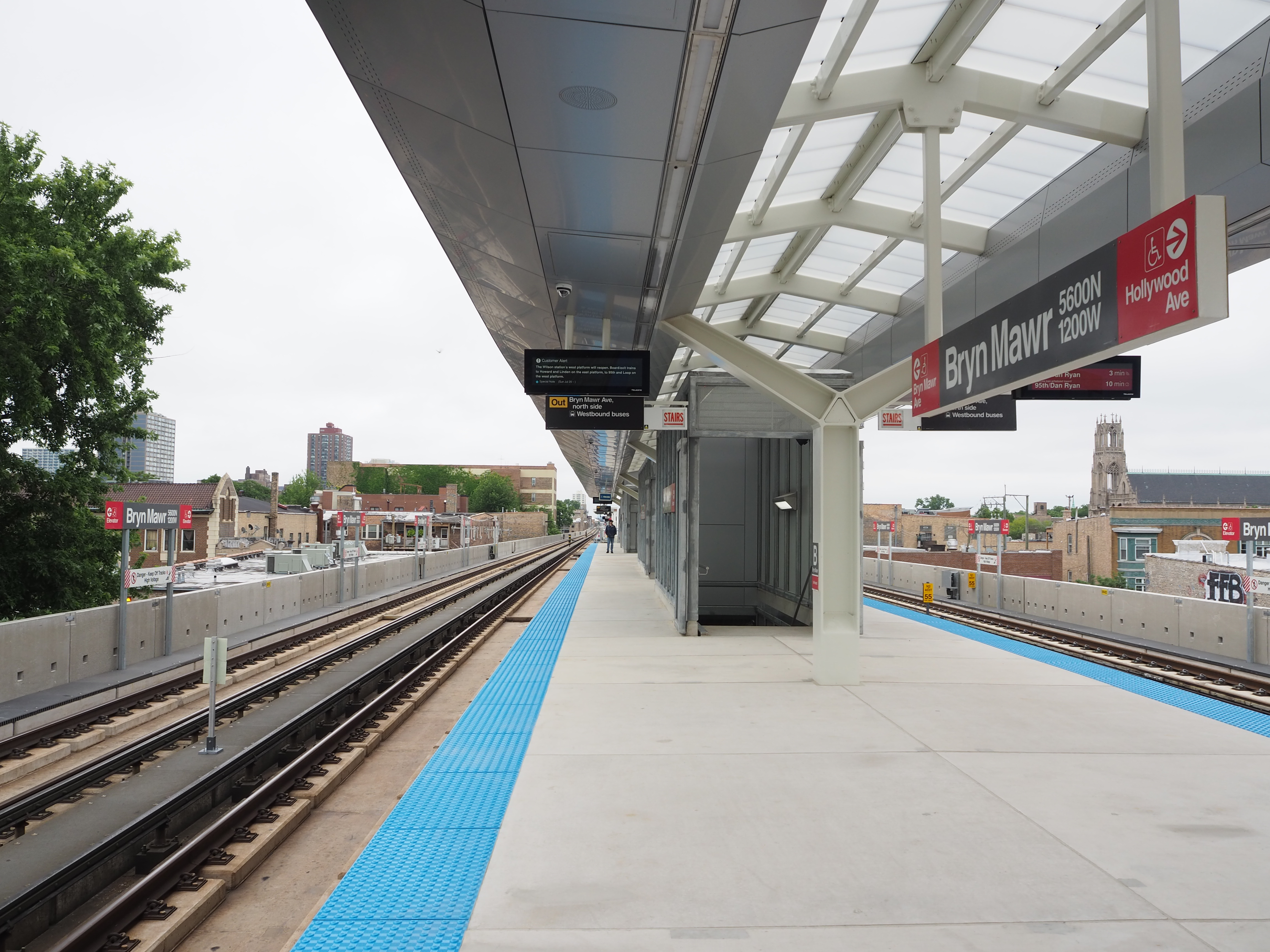
- Rebuilt platform on reopening day

General information
- Location: 1116 West Bryn Mawr Avenue; Chicago, Illinois 60660
- Coordinates: 41.983572°N 87.658862°W
- Owner: Chicago Transit Authority
- Line: North Side Main Line
- Platforms: 1 island platform
- Tracks: 4

Construction
- Structure type: Elevated
- Cycle facilities: Yes
- Accessible: Yes

History
- Opened: May 16, 1908; 118 years ago
- Rebuilt: 1921, 1974, 2021–25
- Former names: Edgewater

Passengers
- 2025: 652,188 ▲21.3%

Services
Preceding station	Chicago "L"	Following station
Thorndale toward Howard	Red Line	Berwyn toward 95th/Dan Ryan
Purple Line does not stop here
Former services
Preceding station	Milwaukee Road	Following station
North Edgewater toward Llewellyn Park	Chicago – Evanston	Argyle Park toward Chicago
Track layout
Location

Bryn Mawr is an 'L' station on the Chicago Transit Authority's (CTA's) Red Line. It is located at 1116 West Bryn Mawr Avenue in the Bryn Mawr Historic District of the Edgewater neighborhood of Chicago, Illinois. The adjacent stations are Thorndale, located about 1/2 mile (0.8 km) to the north, and Berwyn, about 3/8 mile (0.6 km) to the south. Four tracks pass through the station, with an island platform in the center of the tracks; Purple Line weekday rush hour express trains pass through the station on the outer tracks, but do not stop. The name "Bryn Mawr" comes from the SEPTA Regional Rail (and former Pennsylvania Railroad Main Line) station located northwest of Philadelphia in the community of the same name. The name was given to the area in the 1880s by Edgewater developer John Lewis Cochran; it is Welsh for "Big Hill".

== History ==
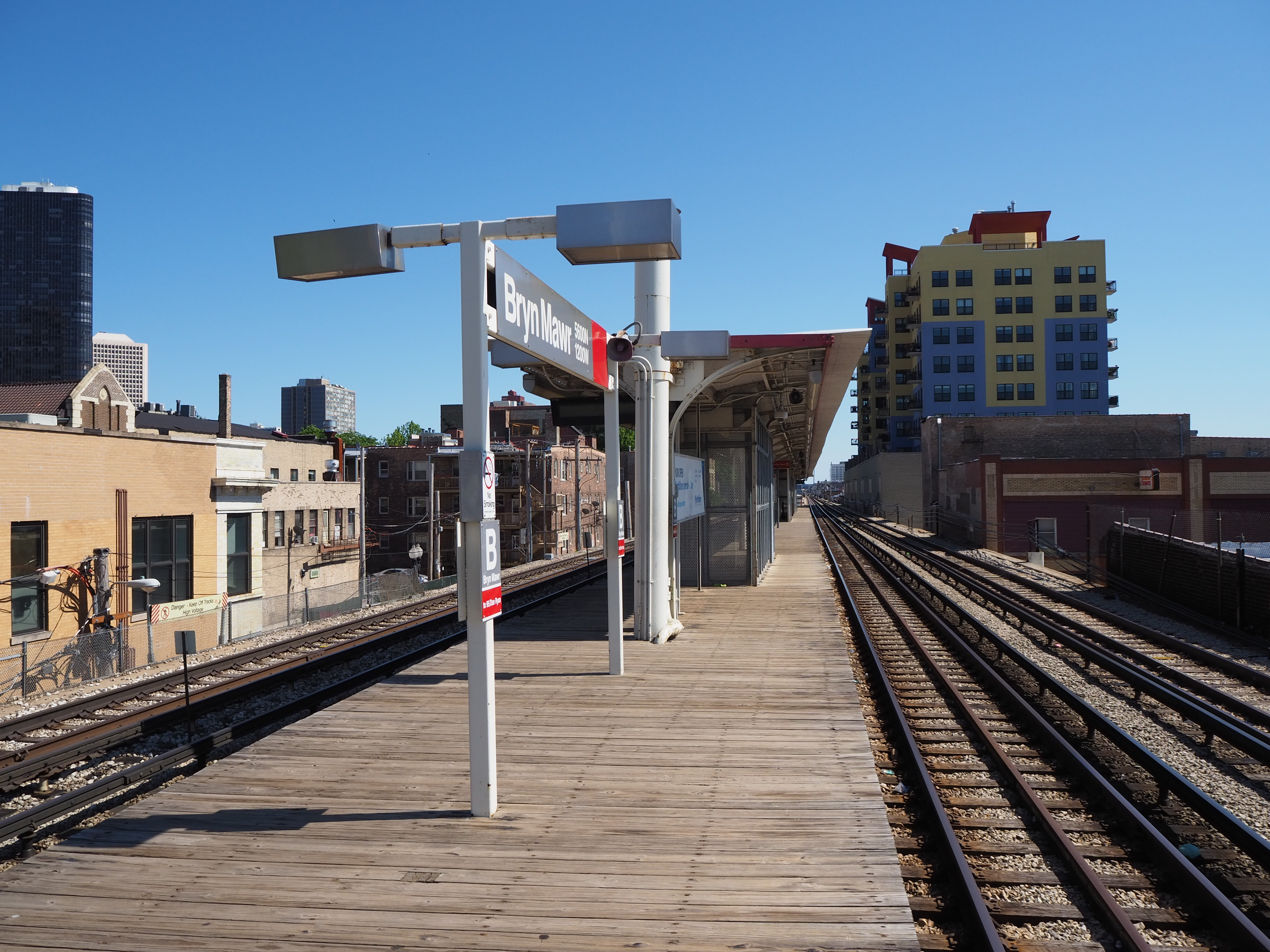
Station platform before reconstruction

A depot on the Chicago, Milwaukee, and St. Paul Railroad Evanston route was constructed at Bryn Mawr in about 1886. When the Northwestern Elevated Railroad was extended north from Wilson in 1908, taking over from Chicago, Milwaukee & St. Paul Railroad, they opened a station at Bryn Mawr called Edgewater Station. This station was rebuilt to a design by architect Charles P. Rawson when the tracks between Wilson and Howard were elevated onto an embankment in 1921 – the name was changed to Bryn Mawr soon after. The station was extensively renovated in 1974, and an escalator was added. In 2006, the signage at Bryn Mawr was replaced, and three-sided pylons which display maps and schedules were installed in the station house and on the platform.

=== Red & Purple Modernization Project ===
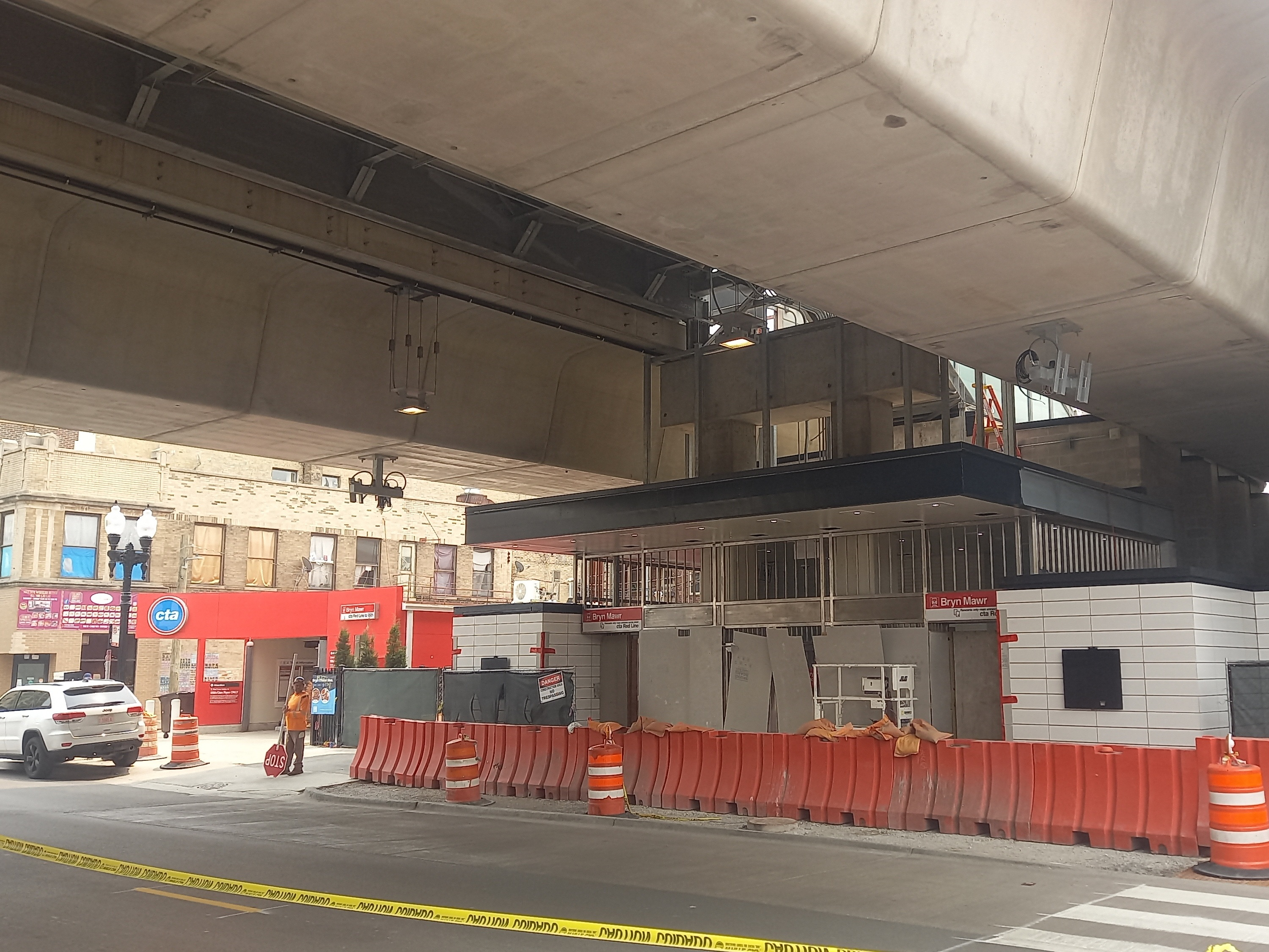
Temporary (left) and permanent (right) station houses during construction (June 2025)

As part of this project, the Bryn Mawr station was rebuilt with a wider platform and new signage, lights, security cameras, and elevators. Reconstruction began in May 2021 and was completed in July 2025. During Stage A of the reconstruction, the northbound tracks were closed, with northbound trains using the southbound side of the original platform and southbound Red Line trains stopping at a temporary side platform on the original Purple Line Express track. Unlike a similar renovation at the same time at Argyle, where both platforms used a common temporary entrance, northbound trains used the original entrance while southbound trains used a temporary entrance half a block north, not connected to each other inside the paid area. During Stage B (2023–25), the two western tracks were out of service, with the new eastern tracks carrying all trains, with a side platform located between each set of tracks just south of the original and permanent new platform. Only southbound trains stopped at Bryn Mawr since there is no space to build a temporary northbound platform. When Stage B finished on July 20, 2025, the station returned to its original track configuration.

== Services ==
Bryn Mawr is used by passengers traveling between the Edgewater neighborhood and other parts of Chicago. The station is open 24 hours a day. Trains service Bryn Mawr every four to ten minutes on weekdays, and every six to ten minutes on weekends. Nighttime "owl" service operates every 15 minutes or more.

The main station house at Bryn Mawr is located on the north side of Bryn Mawr Avenue. There are two auxiliary exits: one on the south side of Bryn Mawr Avenue and another a block north on Hollywood Avenue. Outside of the station house are three granite compass roses to help exiting passengers orient themselves. The fare controls at Bryn Mawr are located at ground level inside the station house; past the fare controls, passengers take stairs, an elevator, or an escalator to the island platform. Bicycle storage is available at Bryn Mawr.

== Bus connections ==
CTA

- 36 Broadway
- 84 Peterson
