= Lawrence station (CTA) =

Chicago "L" station

Lawrence 4800N 1200W
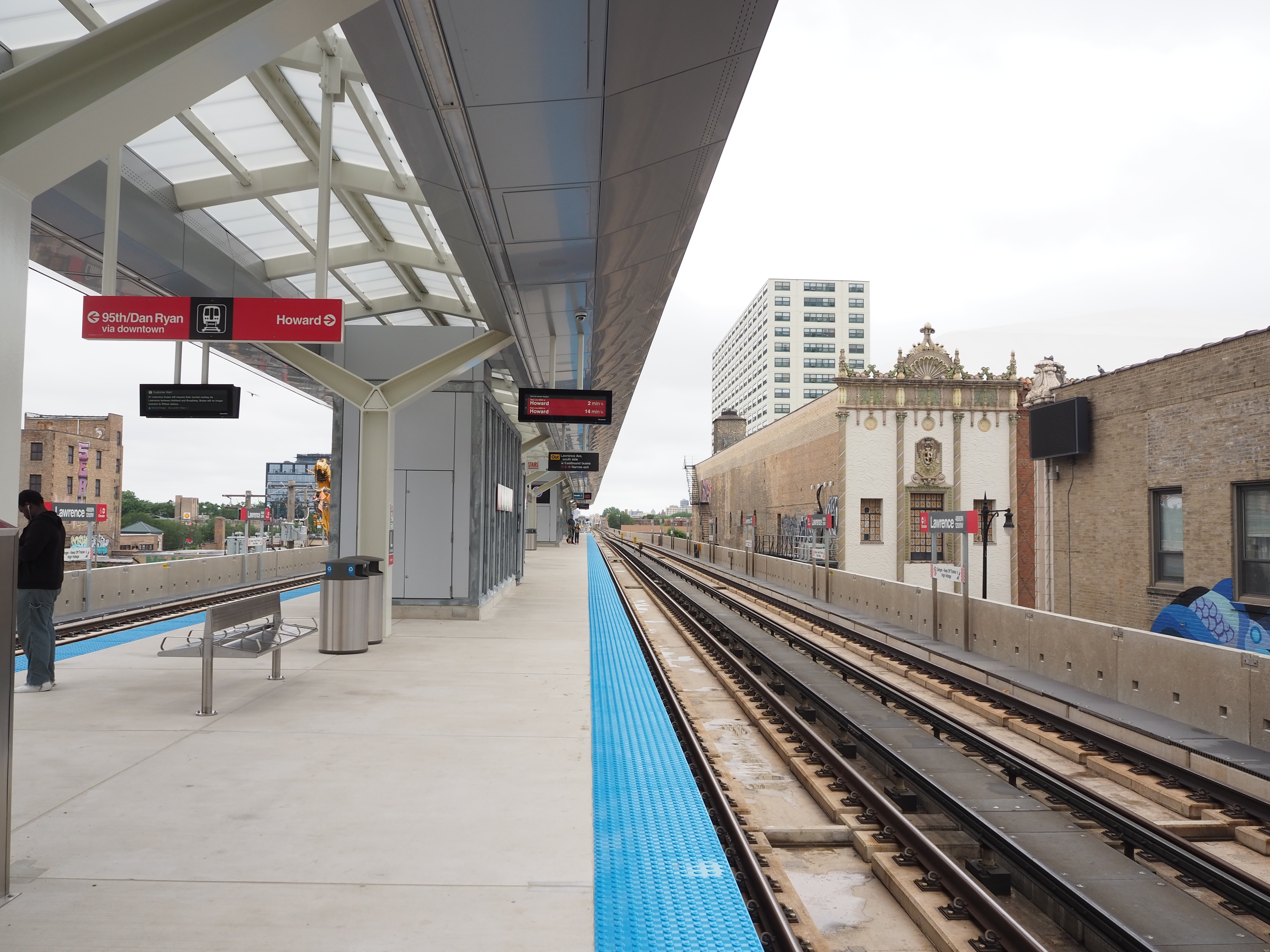
- Rebuilt Lawrence station on opening day

General information
- Location: 1120 West Lawrence Avenue; Chicago, Illinois 60640
- Coordinates: 41.969139°N 87.658493°W
- Owner: Chicago Transit Authority
- Line: North Side Main Line
- Platforms: 1 island platform
- Tracks: 4

Construction
- Structure type: Elevated
- Cycle facilities: Yes
- Accessible: Yes

History
- Opened: February 27, 1923; 103 years ago
- Rebuilt: 1995, 2012, 2021–25

Passengers
- 2025: 294,906

Services
Preceding station	Chicago "L"	Following station
Argyle toward Howard	Red Line	Wilson toward 95th/Dan Ryan
Purple Line does not stop here
Track layout
Location

Lawrence is an 'L' station on the Chicago Transit Authority's Red Line. It is an elevated station located at 1120 West Lawrence Avenue in the Uptown neighborhood of Chicago, Illinois. The adjacent stations are Argyle, located about 1/3 mile (0.54 km) to the north, and Wilson, about 1/4 mile (0.40 km) to the south. Four tracks pass through the station, with a single island platform in the center of the tracks. Purple Line weekday rush hour express service uses the outside tracks and does not stop.

Lawrence station is located in the historic Uptown entertainment district. Nearby attractions include the Aragon Ballroom, the Green Mill Cocktail Lounge, the Riviera Theatre, and the Uptown Theatre.

== History ==
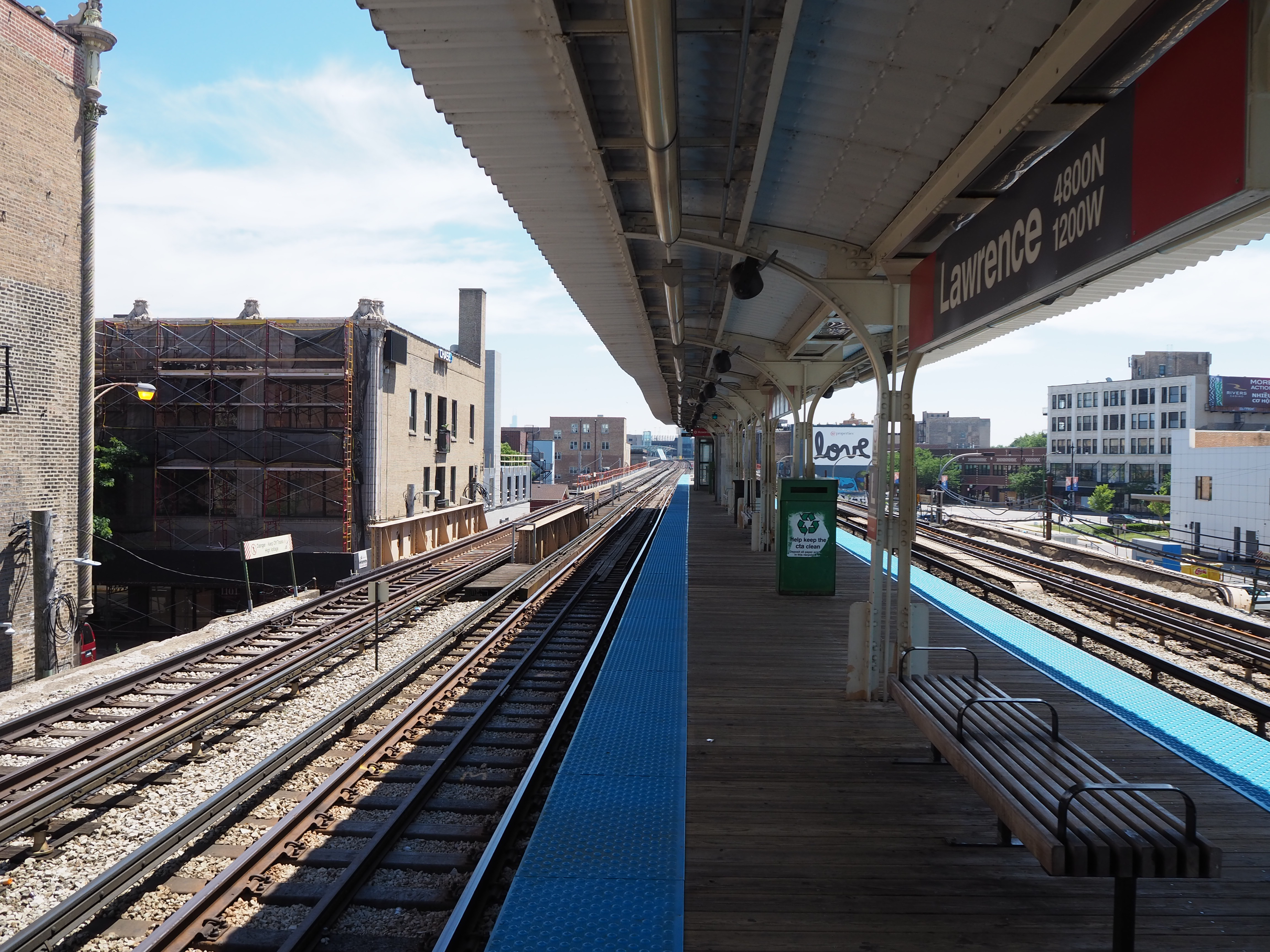
Station platform prior to reconstruction

Lawrence station opened in 1923, shortly after the Northwestern Elevated Railroad was elevated between Wilson and Howard. The original station house was demolished and replaced with a temporary structure in 1995.

=== Red & Purple Modernization Project ===
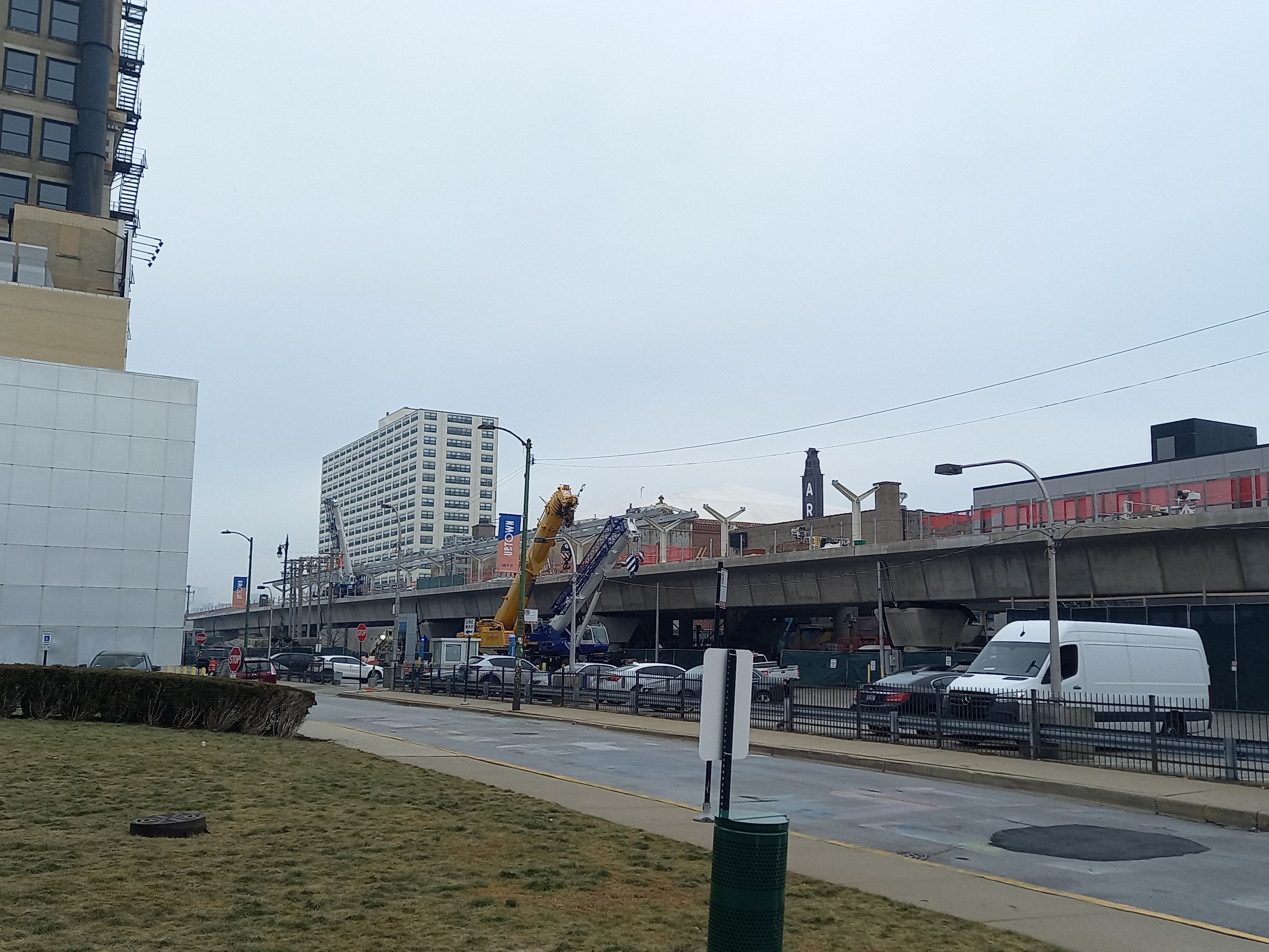
Lawrence station during construction (December 2024)

Closure of the Lawrence station (along with Thorndale, and Jarvis on the Red Line and South Boulevard and Foster on the Purple Line) was proposed in three of the CTA's six potential options for the renovation of the Purple Line and northern section of the Red Line. In two plans, the station would be replaced by a new auxiliary entrance at Ainslie from Argyle, while in the third replacement would be by an auxiliary entrance at Winona from a new subterranean station at Foster.

As part of Phase I of the Red & Purple Modernization Project, the station closed for demolition beginning on May 16, 2021, and a newly constructed station reopened on July 20, 2025. The new station features wider platforms, better lighting, and is accessible to passengers with disabilities.

== Bus connections ==
CTA

- 36 Broadway (approximately one half block away on Broadway)
- 81 Lawrence (Owl Service)
