= Granville station (CTA) =

Chicago "L" station

Granville 6200N 1200W
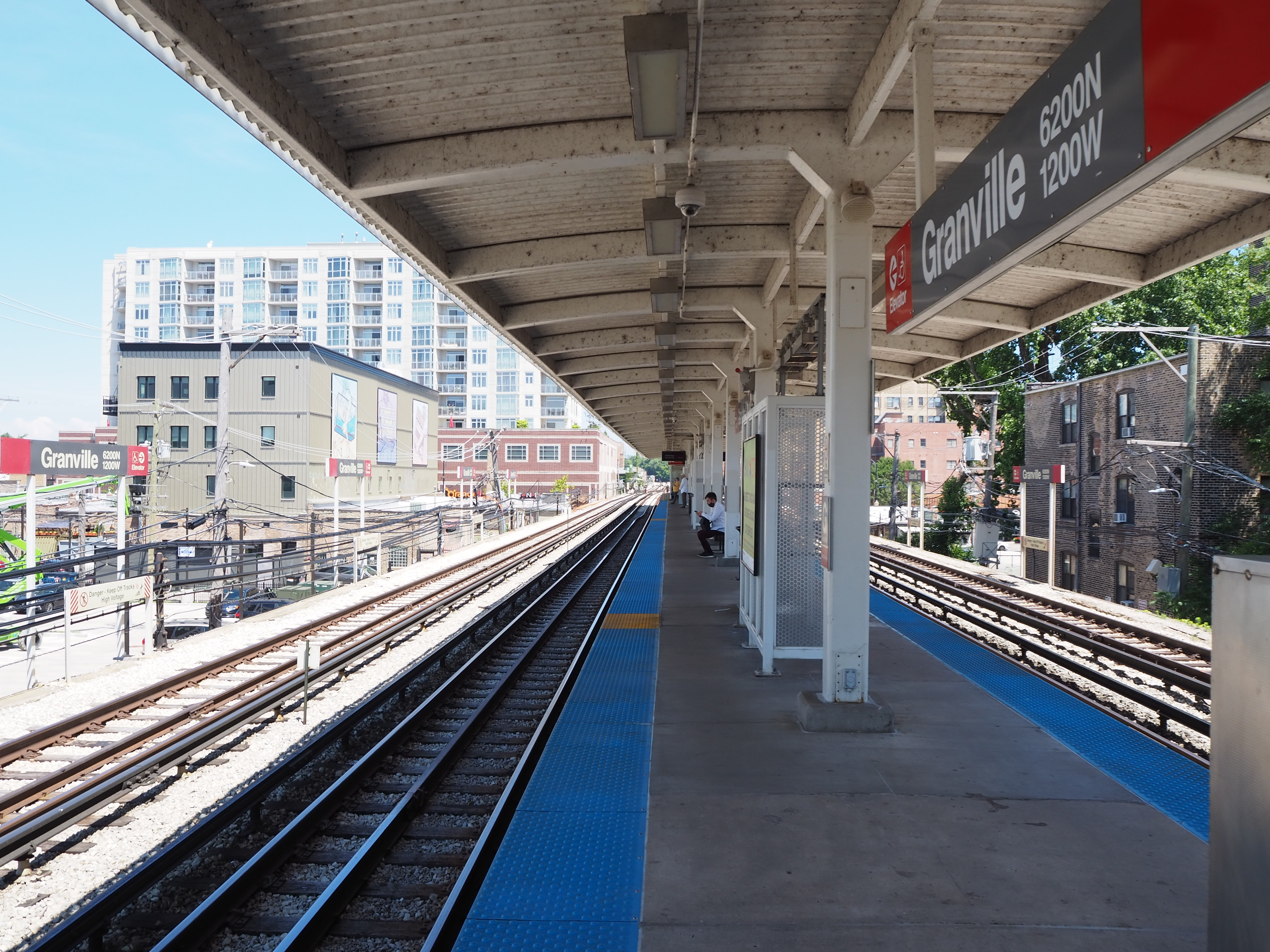

General information
- Location: 1119 West Granville Avenue; Chicago, Illinois 60660
- Coordinates: 41.993731°N 87.659148°W
- Owner: Chicago Transit Authority
- Line: North Side main line
- Platforms: 1 island platform
- Tracks: 4

Construction
- Structure type: Embankment
- Cycle facilities: Yes
- Accessible: Yes

History
- Opened: May 16, 1908; 118 years ago
- Rebuilt: 1921, 1980, 2012
- Former names: North Edgewater

Passengers
- 2025: 787,021 ▲4%

Services
Preceding station	Chicago "L"	Following station
Loyola toward Howard	Red Line	Thorndale toward 95th/Dan Ryan
Purple Line does not stop here
Former services
Preceding station	Milwaukee Road	Following station
Rogers Park toward Llewellyn Park	Chicago – Evanston	Edgewater toward Chicago
Track layout
Location

Granville is a station on the Chicago Transit Authority's Red Line, part of the Chicago 'L' rapid transit system. It is located at 1119 West Granville Avenue in Chicago, Illinois. It is in the Edgewater neighborhood, close to the Rogers Park border. From Granville, trains take 36 minutes to reach the Chicago Loop. Purple Line weekday rush hour express service use the outside tracks and do not stop at this station.

== History ==
Granville station was opened as North Edgewater in 1908. The station was rebuilt in 1921, and the name was changed to Granville. The current station dates to 1980 when an escalator and elevator were added, making this the first Chicago ‘L’ station to feature an elevator for accessibility.

A police station, jointly administered by Loyola University Chicago, the Chicago Transit Authority, and the Chicago Police Department was opened outside the Granville station on March 13, 2006.

=== 2012 renovation ===
As part of an $86 million (equivalent to $121 million in 2025) rehabilitation project on the Red Line, the Granville station closed on June 1, 2012, for renovation. The project lasted approximately one month. Other north side stations were renovated following Granville's completion. The Granville station reopened at 10 p.m. on July 13, 2012.

== Bus connections ==
CTA

- 36 Broadway
- 136 Sheridan/LaSalle Express
- 147 Outer DuSable Lake Shore Express
- 151 Sheridan

The 36 bus stops approximately 1/2 block west of the station entrance, while the 136, 147, and 151 buses stop 2 blocks east on Sheridan Road.
