= Northwestern Elevated Railroad =

Elevated railroad line in Chicago

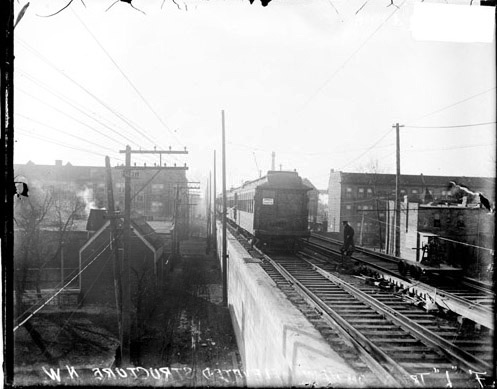
- A wooden 'L' train at Argyle on the newly elevated tracks in 1916

Overview
- Locale: Chicago, Illinois

Service
- Type: Rapid transit
- Operator(s): Northwestern Elevated Railroad Company (1893–1924)

History
- Opened: May 31, 1900
- Closed: 1924 (merged into Chicago Rapid Transit Company)

Technical
- Character: Elevated
- Track gauge: 4 ft 8 1/2 in (1,435 mm) standard gauge
- Electrification: Third rail, Trolley wire 600 V DC

The Northwestern Elevated Railroad was the last of the privately constructed rapid transit lines to be built in Chicago. The line ran from the Loop in downtown Chicago north to Wilson Avenue in Chicago's Uptown neighborhood with a branch to Ravenswood and Albany Park that left the main line at Clark Street. The Ravenswood line is now operated as the Brown Line, while the Main Line is used by the Purple and Red Lines.

== History ==
=== Beginnings ===
The Northwestern Elevated Railroad Company was incorporated on October 30, 1893, and on January 8, 1894, it was granted a 50-year franchise by the City of Chicago. The original franchise stipulated that service between a downtown location to the south of the Chicago River and Wilson Avenue was to begin by December 31, 1897. This franchise was altered in 1895 to allow the line to connect to the new Union Loop. The deadline for completion was later extended to May 31, 1899.

Construction of the line started in February 1896. The project experienced financial difficulties and work was paused later in the year and stopped completely in 1897. New financing was found, and construction began again in July 1899. In order to meet the franchise requirements, an inaugural train ran north from the Loop on December 31, 1899. On January 1, 1900, city officials declared that the railroad was unsafe and that the franchise had expired.

Defiantly, the company ran another train the next day. Police stopped the train and arrested the crew, but company officials took the controls and managed to run the train into the Loop. In order to stop its return, police opened the Wells Street bridge and blocked the track with railroad ties, but the officials managed to evade the police by having the train switched on to the Lake Street Elevated Railroad. Eventually the company reached a new agreement with the city, and the first 6.41-mile (10.32 km) section of the railroad was officially opened on May 31, 1900.

=== Expansion ===
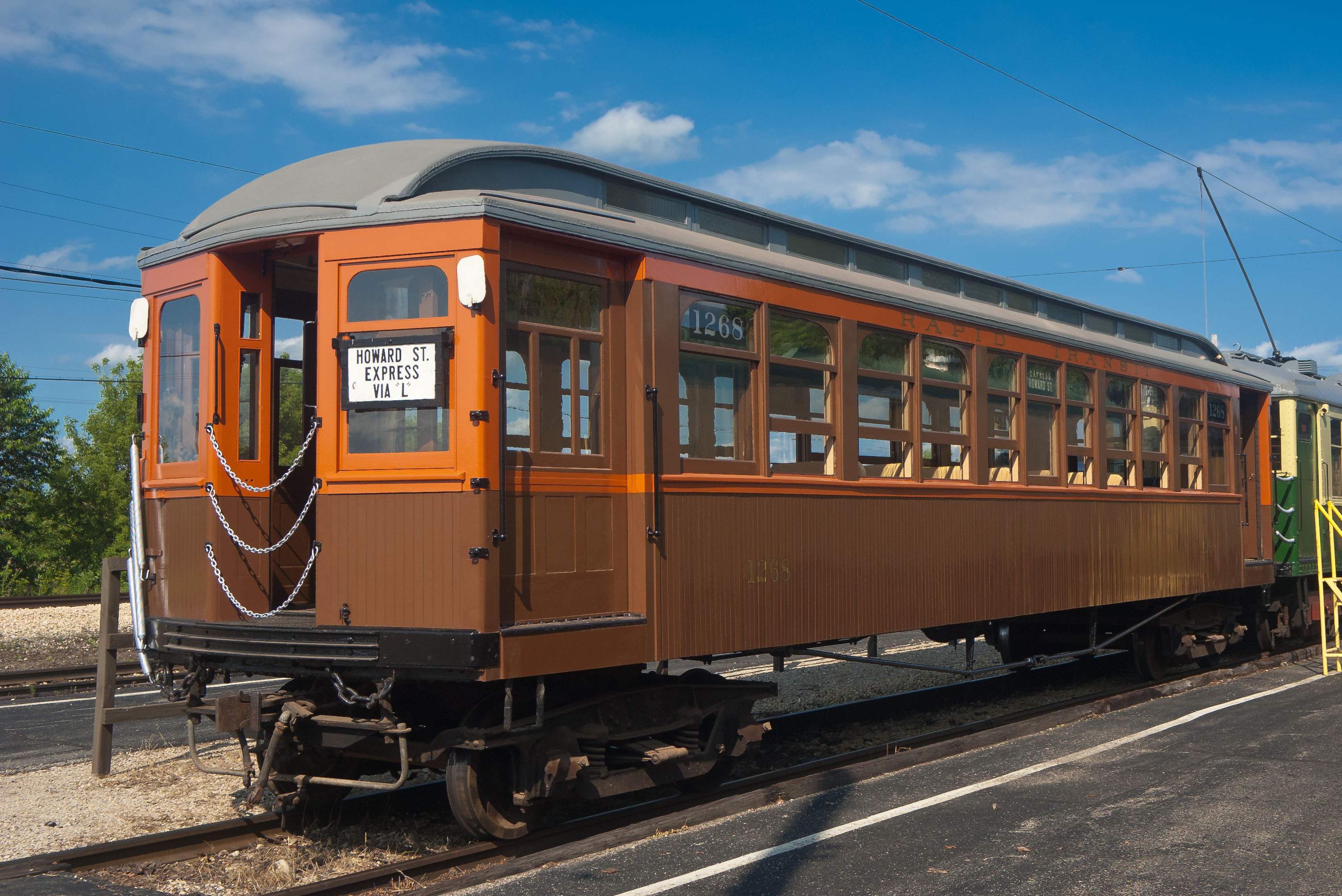
A preserved Northwestern Elevated Railroad car dating from 1907

In May 1907, the Northwestern opened a branch to Ravenswood. The new branch left the main line just south of Clark Street and operated to Western Avenue. An at-grade extension to the branch's final terminal at Kimball opened in December 1907.

Service was extended 7 miles (11 km) north from the Wilson terminal to Central Street in suburban Evanston in May 1908. This route was over the electrified trackage of the Milwaukee Road's Chicago and Evanston line. Initially the elevated tracks at Wilson were linked to the street level tracks of the Milwaukee Road by a wooden trestle incline.

The Milwaukee Road depots at Argyle Park, Edgewater, North Edgewater, Rogers Park, Birchwood, Calvary, Main, Dempster, Davis, Noyes and Central were demolished and the tracks spread to allow their replacement with new temporary island platform stations. New stations were also added at Hayes Street and Howard Avenue. The section of the line in southern Evanston between Howard Avenue and University Place was elevated onto an embankment by 1910, and the tracks between Lawrence and Howard were elevated between 1914 and 1922.

A short extension from Central to Linden Avenue in Wilmette was hurriedly built over one night in April 1912.

=== Consolidation ===
In 1913, Chicago's four elevated railroad companies came together to form the Chicago Elevated Railways Collateral Trust, establishing crosstown services for the first time. In 1924, all four companies were formally united to form the Chicago Rapid Transit Company. The Chicago Transit Authority took over the assets of the CRT in 1947.

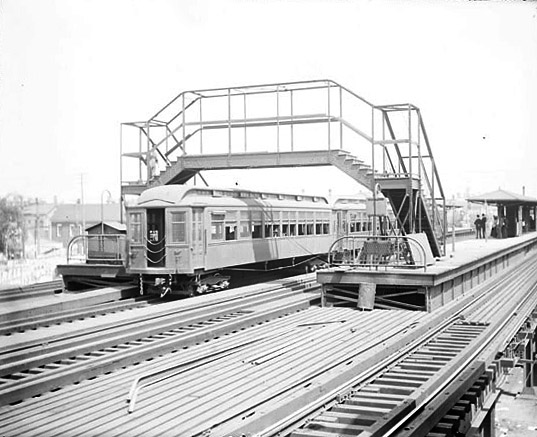
Belmont

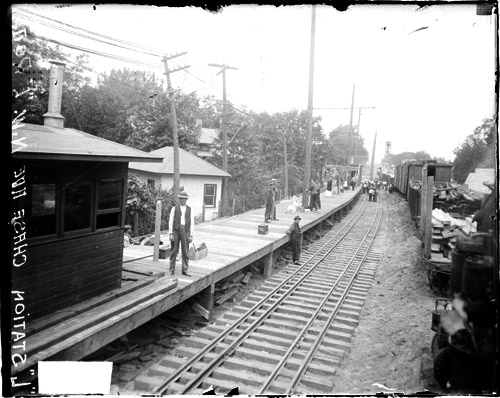
Jarvis
