= Chicago "L" =

Rapid transit system in Chicago, Illinois

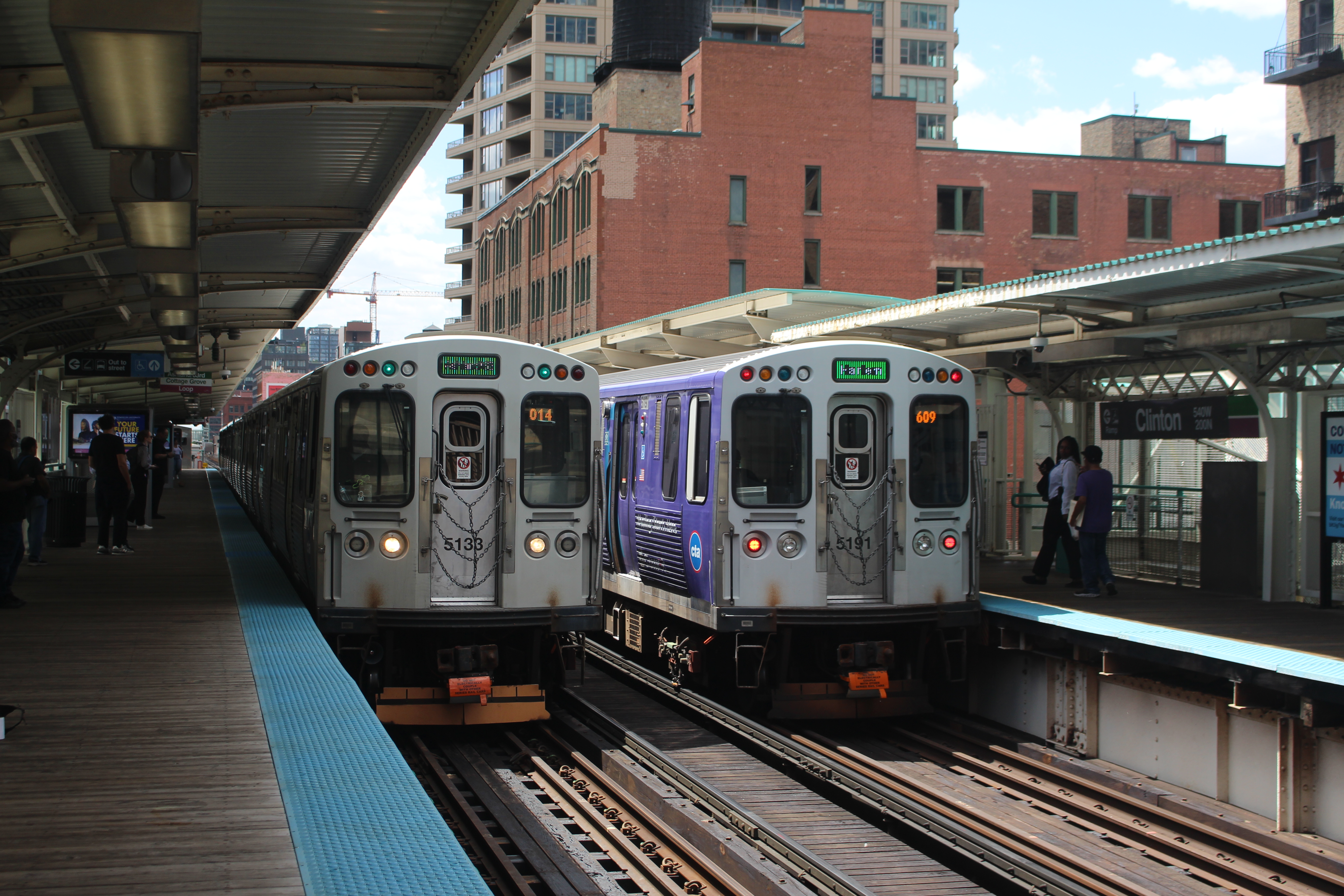
- Two Green Line trains, Ashland/63rd-bound (left) and Harlem/Lake-bound (right), at Clinton station

Overview
- Owner: Northern Illinois Transit Authority
- Locale: Chicago, Illinois, and suburbs, United States
- Transit type: Rapid transit
- Number of lines: 8
- Line number: Blue Line; Brown Line; Green Line; Orange Line; Pink Line; Purple Line; Red Line; Yellow Line
- Number of stations: 146
- Daily ridership: 447,000 (weekdays, Q2 2026)
- Annual ridership: 135,202,800 (2025)
- Chief executive: Nora Leerhsen
- Headquarters: 567 West Lake Street; Chicago, Illinois
- Website: www.transitchicago.com

Operation
- Began operation: June 6, 1892; 134 years ago
- Operator: Chicago Transit Authority

Technical
- System length: 102.8 mi (165.4 km) (Note: This figure comes from the sum of the following figures from the accompanying reference (i.e. "CTA Facts at a Glance". Chicago: Chicago Transit Authority. Archived from the original on December 19, 2008.): 35.8 miles of elevated route, 35.0 miles at grade level, 20.6 miles on embankments, and 11.4 miles of subway.)
- Track gauge: 4 ft 8 1/2 in (1,435 mm) standard gauge
- Minimum radius of curvature: 90 feet (27.432 m)
- Electrification: Third rail, 600 V DC
- Top speed: 55 mph (90 km/h)
System map
Map of the Chicago "L"
- ‡ = temporarily closed for reconstruction ◇ = under construction
Key

The Chicago "L" (short for "elevated") is a rapid transit system serving the city of Chicago and some of its surrounding suburbs in the U.S. state of Illinois. The system is operated by the Chicago Transit Authority (CTA), one of the three service boards of the Northern Illinois Transit Authority (NITA). It is the fourth-largest rapid transit system in the United States in terms of total route length, at 102.8 miles (165.4 km), as of 2014, and the third-busiest rapid transit system in the United States after the New York City Subway and the Washington Metro. As of January 2024, the "L" had 1,480 rail cars operating across eight different routes on 224.1 miles of track. CTA trains make about 1,888 trips each day servicing 146 train stations. In 2025, the system had 135,202,800 rides, or about 447,000 per weekday in the second quarter of 2026.

The "L" provides 24-hour service on the Red and Blue Lines, making Chicago, New York City, London and Copenhagen the only four cities in the world to offer 24-hour train service on some of their lines throughout their respective city limits. (Note: (PATCO Speedline (until 2025) and PATH have 24-hour service but do not run throughout their respective primary cities, but rather serve to connect the cities and suburbs of different states with the primary city, functioning more akin to a commuter railroad.)) The Orange Line has planned 24-hour service beginning in 2026. The oldest sections of the Chicago "L" started operations in 1892, making it the second-oldest rapid transit system in the Americas, after New York City's elevated lines. The "L" gained its name from "el" because most parts of the system run on elevated track, although portions of the network are in subway tunnels, at grade level, or in open cuts.

The "L" has been credited for fostering the growth of Chicago's dense city core that is one of the city's distinguishing features. And according to urban engineer Christof Speiler, the system stands out in the United States because it continued to invest in services even through the post-World-War era growth of the expressway; its general use of alleyways instead of streets throughout its history, and expressway medians after the war, better knit the system into the city, and in pioneering ways. It consists of eight rapid transit lines laid out in a spoke–hub distribution paradigm focusing transit toward the Loop.

In a 2005 poll, Chicago Tribune readers voted it one of the "seven wonders of Chicago", behind the lakefront and Wrigley Field, and ahead of Willis Tower (formerly the Sears Tower), the Water Tower, the University of Chicago, and the Museum of Science and Industry.

== History ==
=== Pre-CTA era ===
The first "L", the Chicago and South Side Rapid Transit Railroad, began revenue service on June 6, 1892, when a steam locomotive pulling four wooden coaches, carrying more than a couple of dozen people, departed the 39th Street station and arrived at the Congress Street Terminal 14 minutes later, over tracks that are still in use by the Green Line. Over the next year, service was extended to 63rd Street and Stony Island Avenue, then the Transportation Building of the World's Columbian Exposition in Jackson Park.

In 1893, trains began running on the Lake Street Elevated Railroad and in 1895 on the Metropolitan West Side Elevated, which had lines to Douglas Park, Garfield Park (since replaced), Humboldt Park (since demolished), and Logan Square. The Metropolitan was the United States' first non-exhibition rapid transit system powered by electric traction motors, a technology whose practicality had been demonstrated in 1893 on the Columbian Intramural Railway at the World's Columbian Exposition in Chicago. Two years later the South Side "L" introduced multiple-unit control, in which the operator can control all the motorized cars in a train, not just the lead unit. Electrification and MU control remain standard features of most of the world's rapid transit systems.

A drawback of early "L" service was that none of the lines entered the central business district. Instead trains dropped passengers at stub terminals on the periphery due to a state law at the time requiring approval by neighboring property owners for tracks built over public streets, something not easily obtained downtown. This obstacle was overcome by the legendary traction magnate Charles Tyson Yerkes, who went on to play a pivotal role in the development of the London Underground, and who was immortalized by Theodore Dreiser as the ruthless schemer Frank Cowperwood in The Titan (1914) and other novels.

Yerkes, who controlled much of the city's streetcar system, obtained the necessary signatures through cash and guile—at one point he secured a franchise to build a mile-long "L" over Van Buren Street from Wabash Avenue to Halsted Street, extracting the requisite majority from the pliable owners on the western half of the route, then building tracks chiefly over the eastern half, where property owners had opposed him. Designed by noted bridge builder John Alexander Low Waddell, the elevated tracks used a multiple close-rivet system to withstand the forces of the passing trains' kinetic energy.

The Union Loop opened in 1897 and greatly increased the rapid transit system's convenience. Operation on the Yerkes-owned Northwestern Elevated, which built the North Side "L" lines, began three years later, essentially completing the elevated infrastructure in the urban core although extensions and branches continued to be constructed in outlying areas through the 1920s.

After 1911, the "L" lines came under the control of Samuel Insull, president of the Chicago Edison electric utility (now Commonwealth Edison), whose interest stemmed initially from the fact that the trains were the city's largest consumer of electricity. Insull instituted many improvements, including free transfers and through routing, although he did not formally combine the original firms into the Chicago Rapid Transit Company until 1924. He also bought three other Chicago electrified railroads, the Chicago North Shore and Milwaukee Railroad, Chicago Aurora and Elgin Railroad, and South Shore Line interurban lines, and ran the trains of the first two into downtown Chicago via the "L" tracks.

This period of relative prosperity ended when Insull's empire collapsed in 1932, but later in the decade the city, with the help of the federal government, accumulated sufficient funds to begin construction of two subway lines to supplement and, some hoped, permit eventual replacement of the Loop elevated; as early as the 1920s some city leaders wanted to replace the "ugly" elevated tracks. These plans advanced in the 1970s under mayors Richard J. Daley and Michael Bilandic until a public outcry against tearing down the popular "L" began, led by Chicago Tribune columnist Paul Gapp and architect Harry Weese. Instead, then new Mayor Jane Byrne protected the elevated lines and directed their rehabilitation.

The State Street subway opened on October 17, 1943. The Dearborn Subway, on which work had been suspended during World War II, opened on February 25, 1951. The subways were constructed with a secondary purpose of serving as bomb shelters, as evidenced by the close spacing of the support columns (a more extensive plan proposed replacing the entire elevated system with subways). The subways bypassed a number of tight curves and circuitous routings on the original elevated lines (Milwaukee trains, for example, originated on Chicago's northwest side but entered the Loop at the southwest corner), speeding service for many riders.

==== Gallery ====
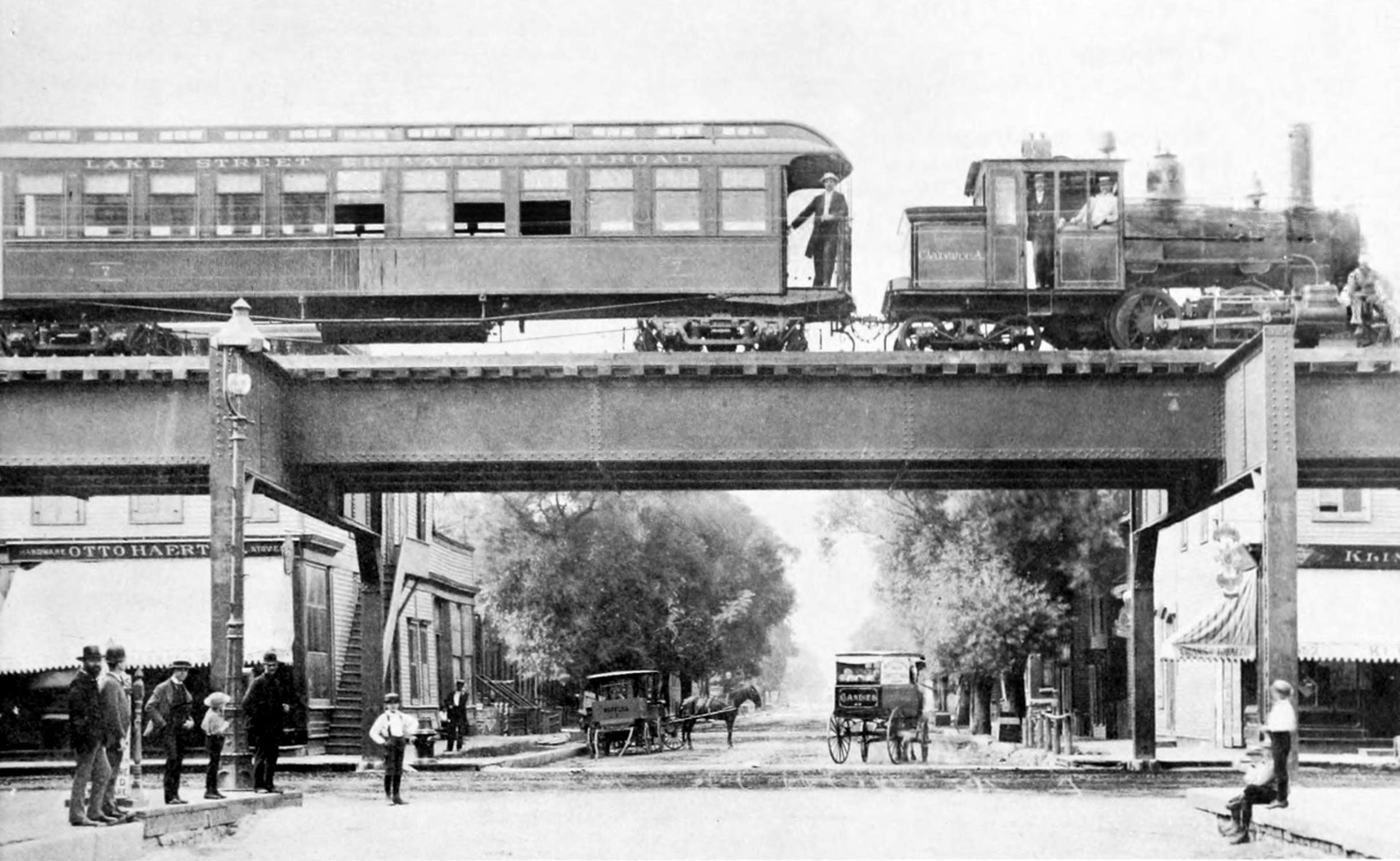
A steam train on the Lake Street Elevated Railroad, 1893

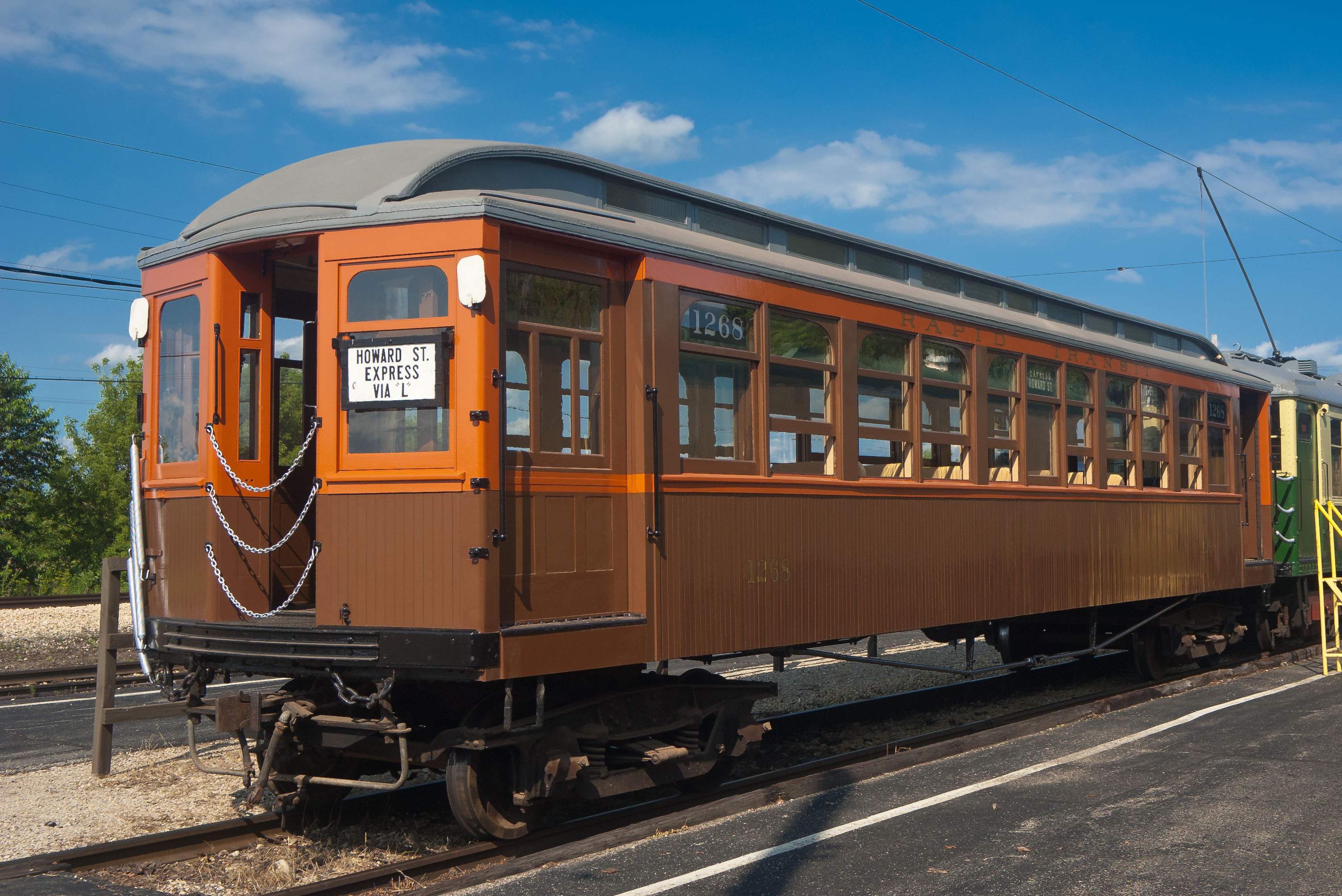
A preserved Northwestern Elevated Railroad car dating from 1907

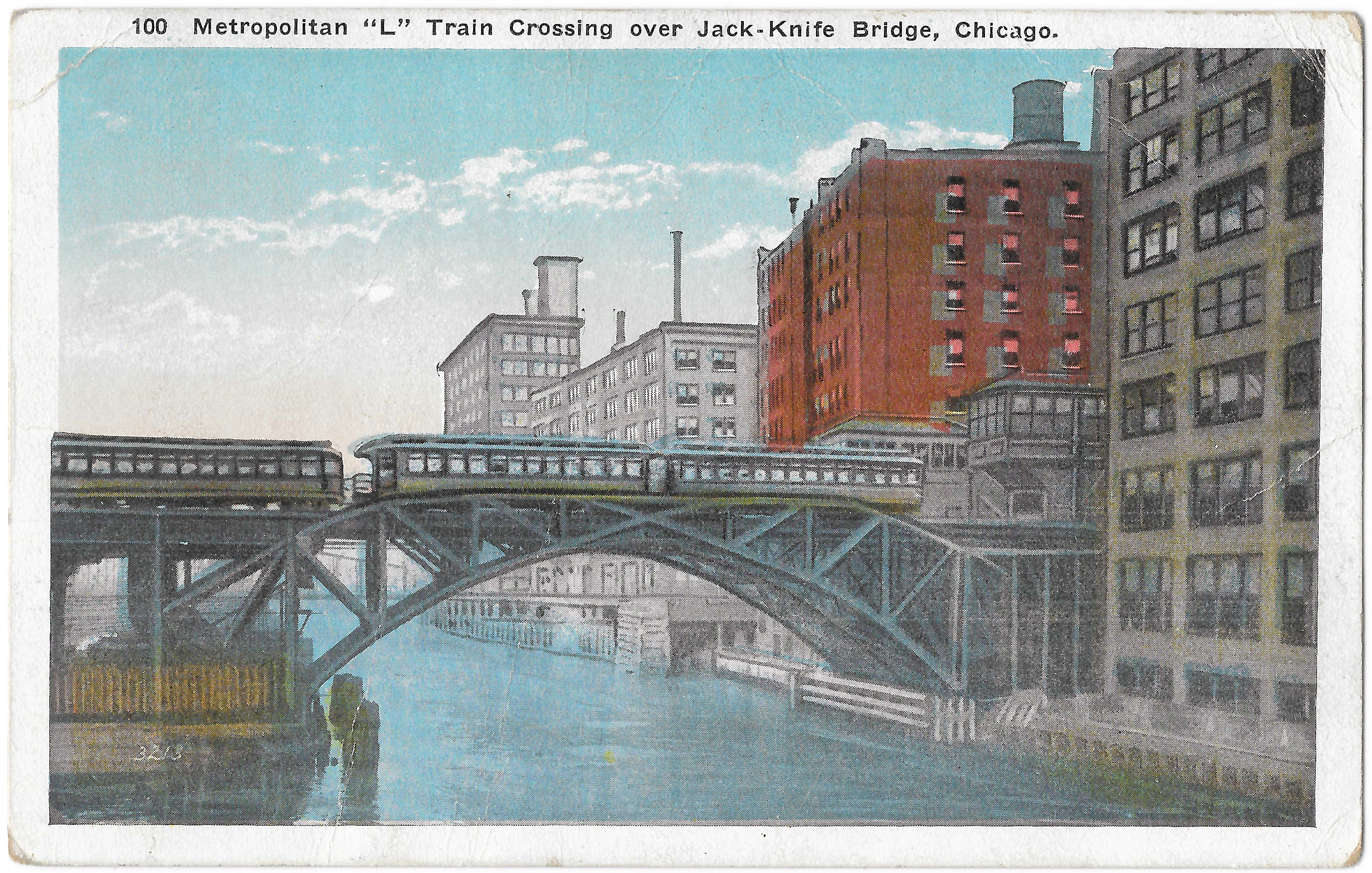
A Metropolitan West Side Elevated Railroad "L" train passing over the Chicago River in 1918

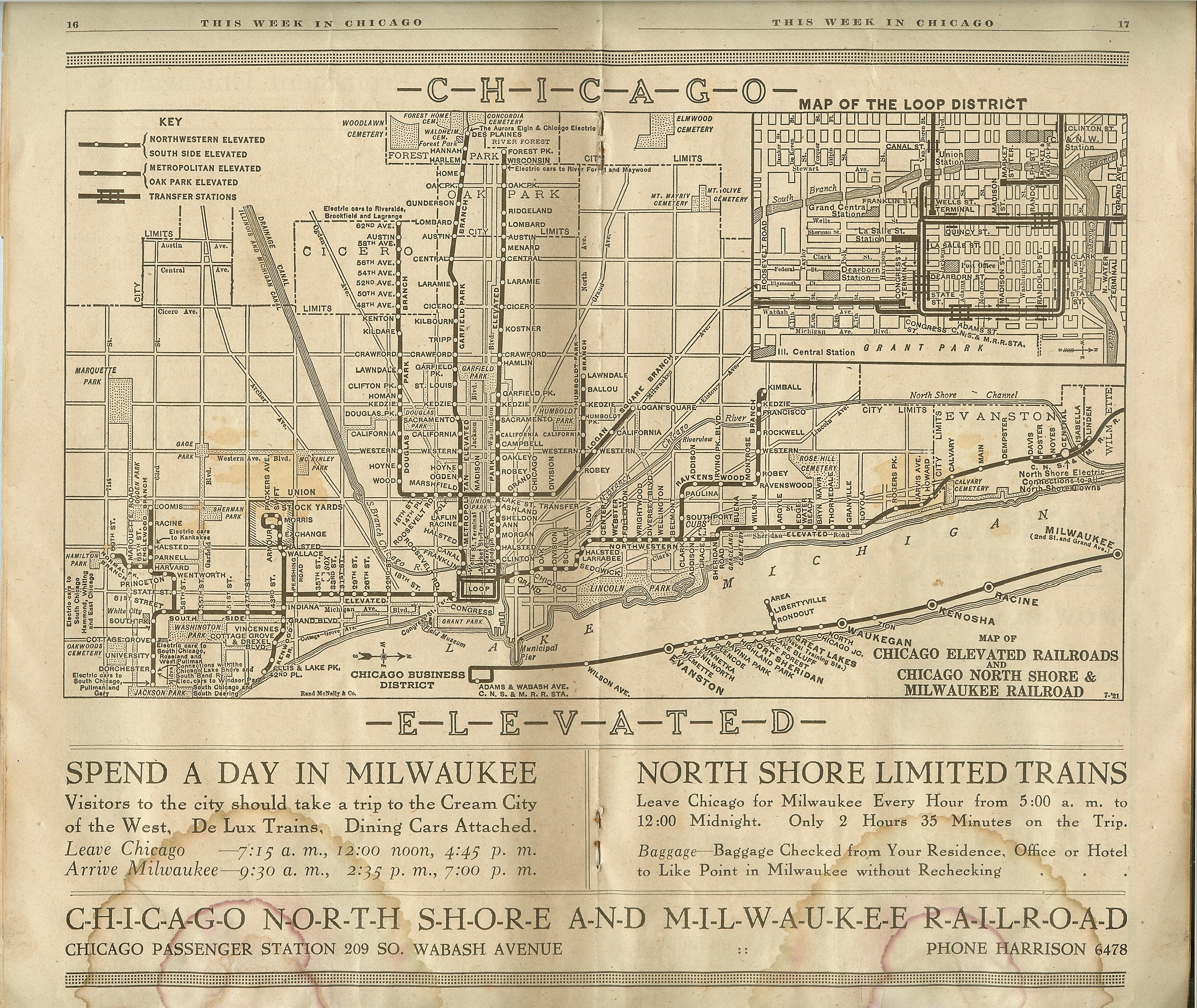
Map of the "L" in 1921

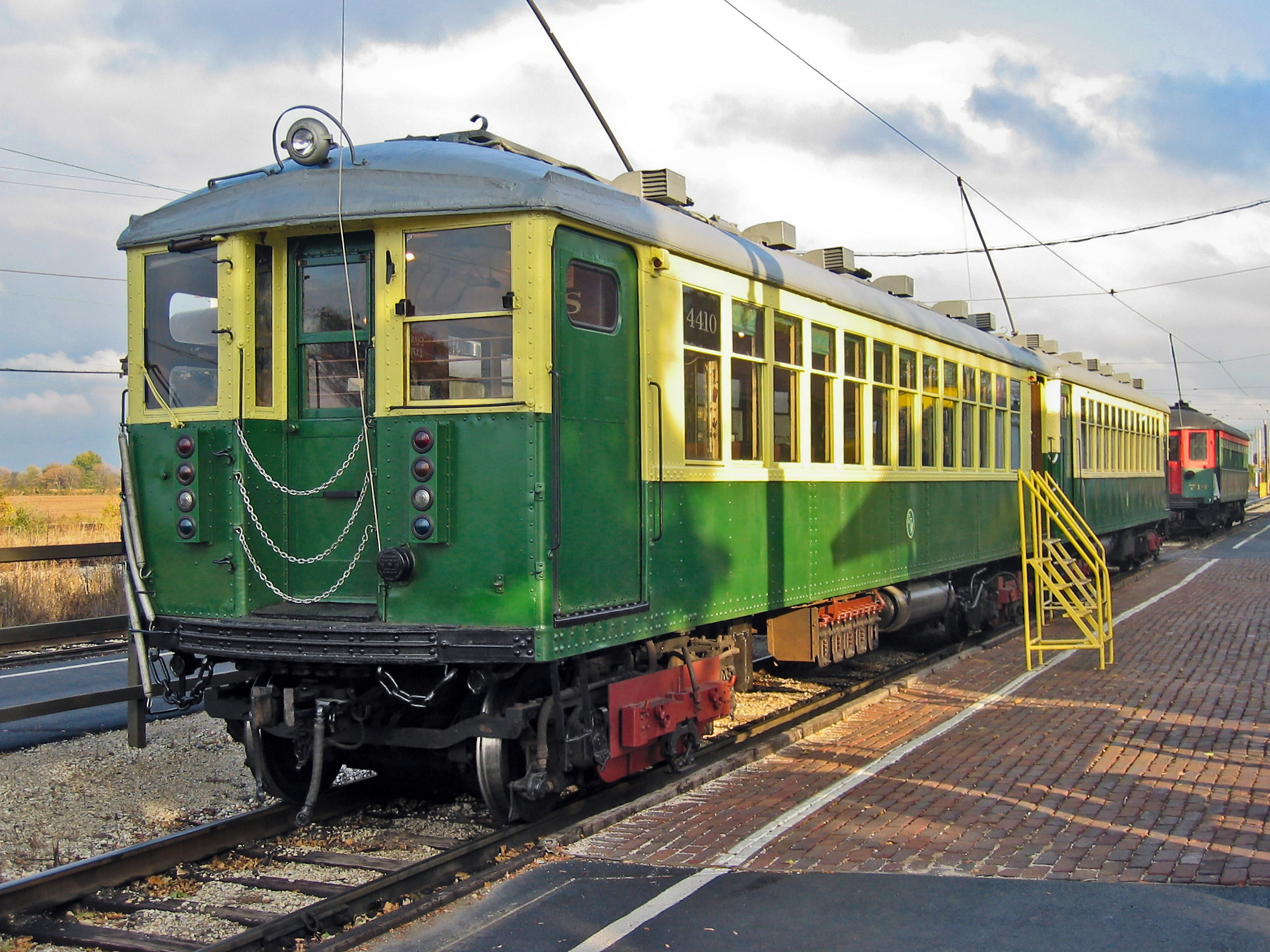
1922 vintage Chicago Rapid Transit Company 'L' cars. This car had a trolley pole in addition to contact shoes on the trucks.

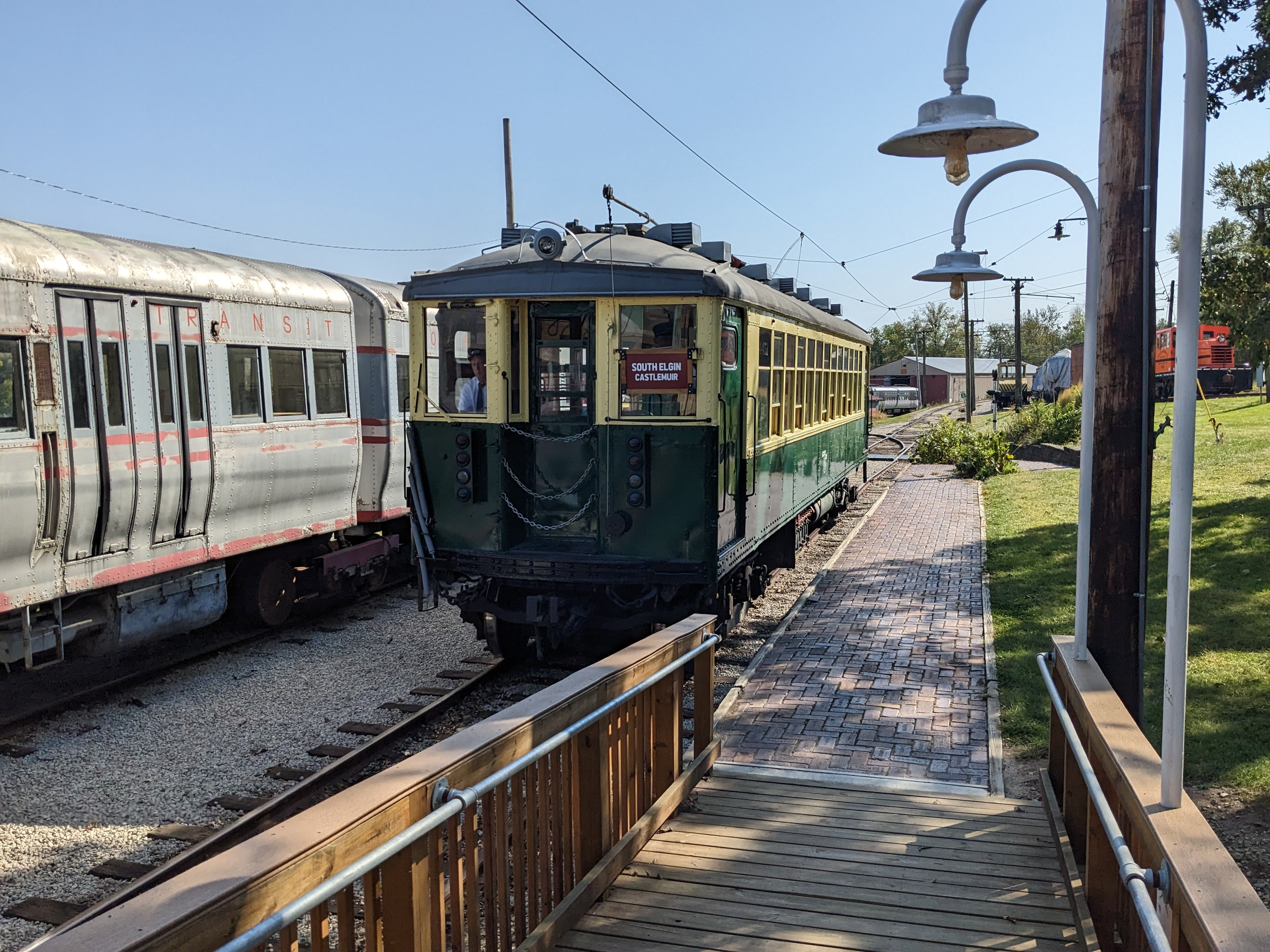
A preserved 1924 Chicago Transit Authority steel "L" car at the Fox River Trolley Museum

=== CTA assumes control ===
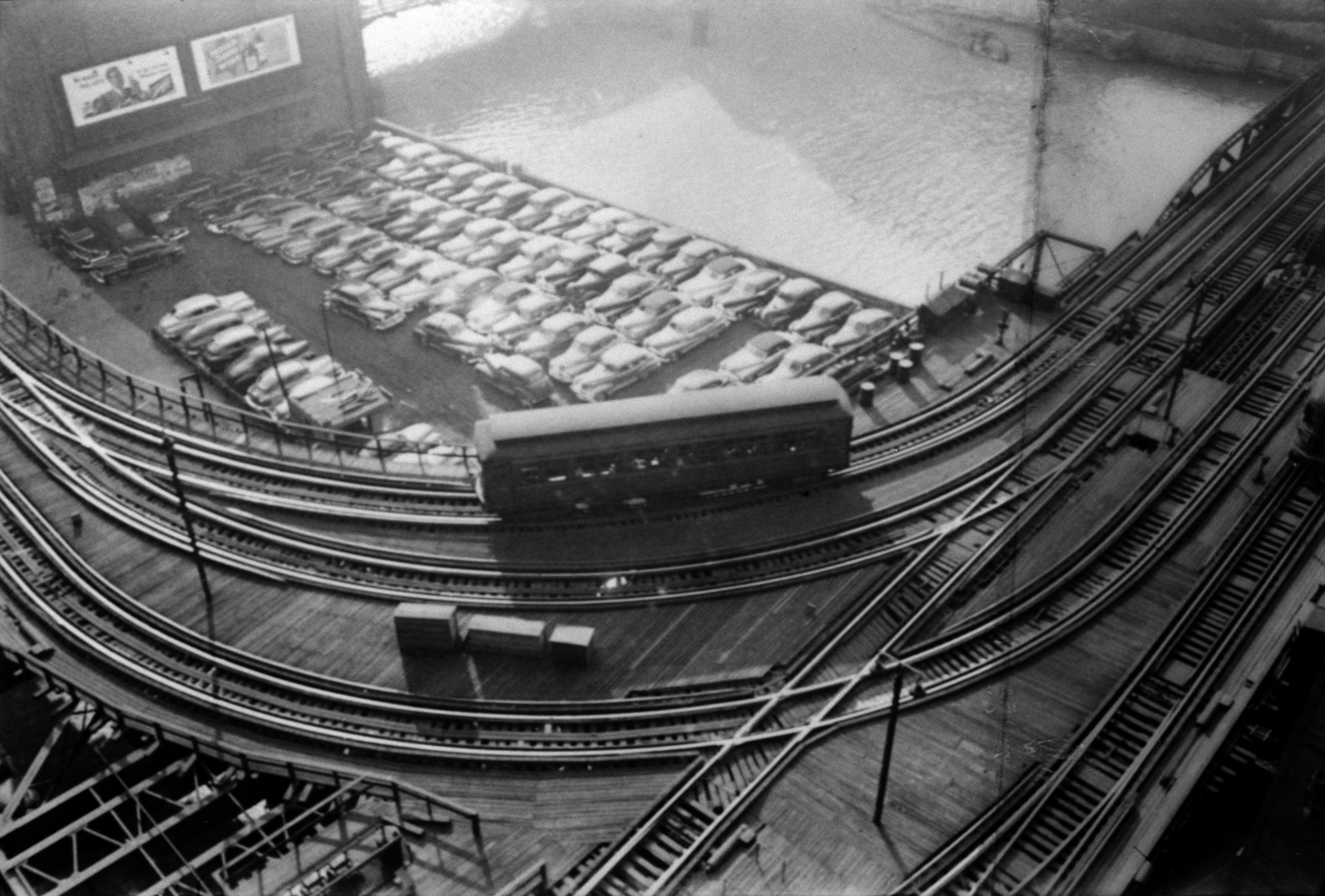
A train on the "L" in 1949 as photographed by Stanley Kubrick for Look magazine

By the 1940s, the financial condition of the "L", and of Chicago mass transit in general, had become too precarious to permit continued operation without subsidies, and the necessary steps were taken to enable a public takeover. In 1947, the Chicago Transit Authority (CTA) acquired the assets of the Chicago Rapid Transit Company and the Chicago Surface Lines, operator of the city's streetcars. Over the next few years CTA modernized the "L", replacing wooden cars with new steel ones and closing lightly used branch lines and stations, many of which had been spaced only a quarter-mile apart.

Rail service to O'Hare International Airport first opened in 1984 and to Midway International Airport in 1993. That same year, the CTA renamed all of its rail lines; they are now identified by color. The CTA introduced fare cards for the first time in 1997.

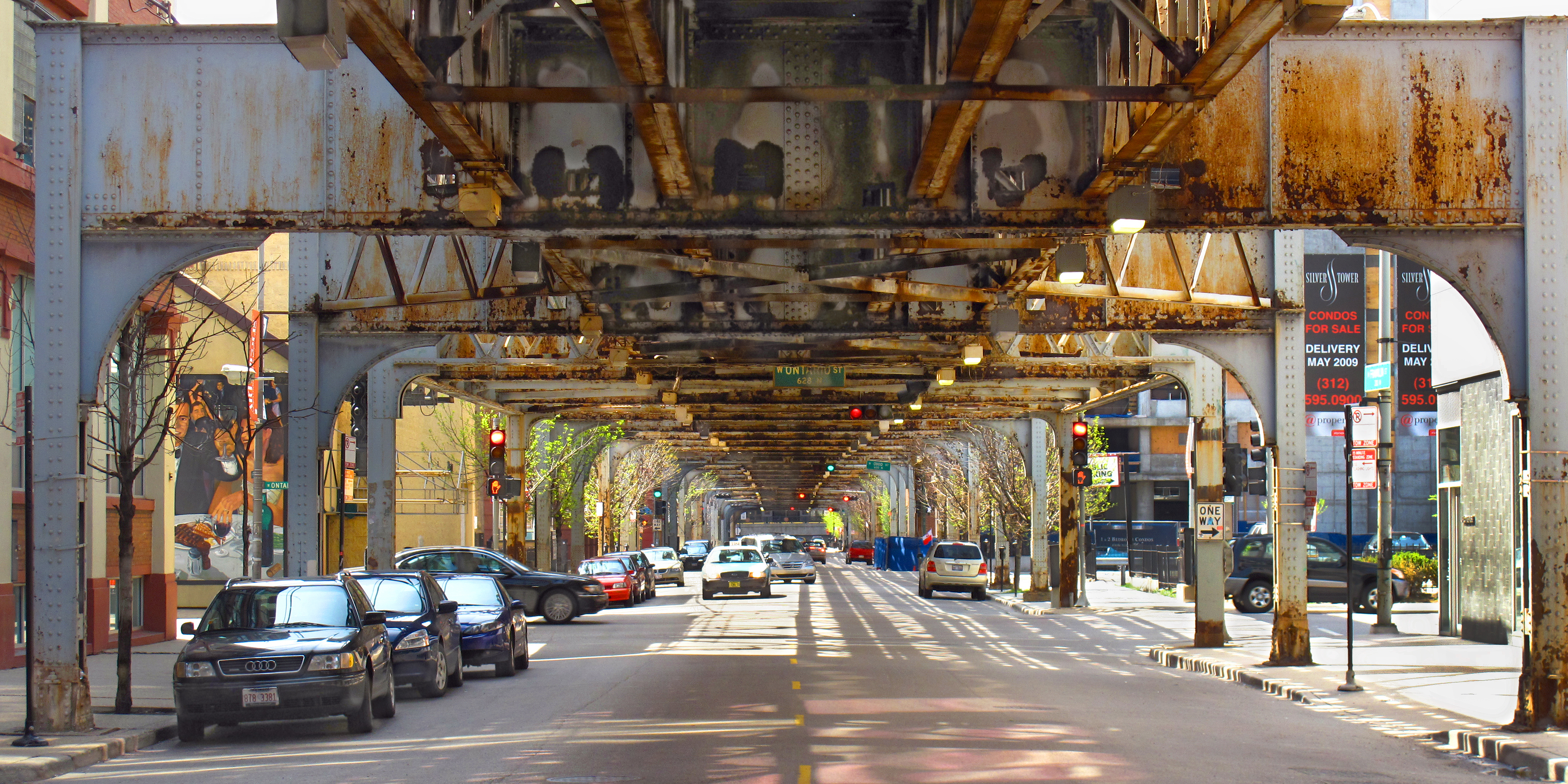
The Brown and Purple Chicago "L" lines run above vehicular traffic on Franklin Street in the Near North Side community area.

==== Skip-stop service ====
Later, after assuming control of the "L", the CTA introduced A/B skip-stop service. Under this service, trains were designated as either "A" or "B" trains, and stations were alternately designated as "A" stations or "B" stations, with heavily used stations designated as both – "AB". "A" trains would stop only at "A" and "AB" stations, and "B" trains would stop only at "B" and "AB" stations. The system was designed to speed up lines by having trains skip stations while still allowing for frequent service at the heavily used "AB" stations.

A/B skip-stop service debuted on the Lake Street Elevated in 1948, and the service proved effective as travel times were cut by a third. By the 1950s, the service was used throughout the system. All lines used the A/B skip-stop service between the 1950s and the 1990s with the exception of the Evanston and Skokie lines, which were suburban-only lines and did not justify skip-stop service.

On the lines with branches, skip-stop service sent all "A" trains to one branch and "B" trains to another branch. Individual stops were not skipped beyond the points where those branches diverged. As time went by, the time periods which employed skip-stop service gradually decreased, as the waits at "A" and "B" stations became increasingly longer during non-peak service.

By the 1990s, use of the A/B skip-stop system was only used during rush hour service. Another problem was that trains skipping stations to save time still could not pass the train that was directly ahead, so skipping stations was not advantageous in all regards. In 1993, the CTA began to eliminate skip-stop service when it switched the southern branches of the West-South and North-South Lines to improve rider efficiency, creating the current Red and Green Lines. From this point, Green Line trains made all stops along the entire route, while Red Line trains stopped at all stations south of Harrison. The elimination of A/B skip-stop service continued with the opening of the all-stop Orange Line and the conversion of the Brown Line to all-stop service.

In April 1995, the last of the A/B skip-stop system was eliminated with the conversion of the O'Hare branch of the Blue Line and the Howard branch of the Red Line to all-stop service. The removal of skip-stop service resulted in some increases in travel times, and greatly increased ridership at former "A" and "B" stations due to increased train frequencies. Station signage highlighting the former skip-stop patterns would remain into the 2000s, when it was gradually replaced across the system.

==== New rolling stock ====
The first air-conditioned cars were introduced in 1964. The last pre–World War II cars were retired in 1973. New lines were built in expressway medians, a technique implemented in Chicago and followed by other cities worldwide. The Congress branch, built in the median of the Eisenhower Expressway, replaced the Garfield Park "L" in 1958. The Dan Ryan branch, built in the median of the Dan Ryan Expressway, opened on September 28, 1969, followed by an extension of the Milwaukee elevated into the Kennedy Expressway in 1970.

=== System renovation and service improvements ===
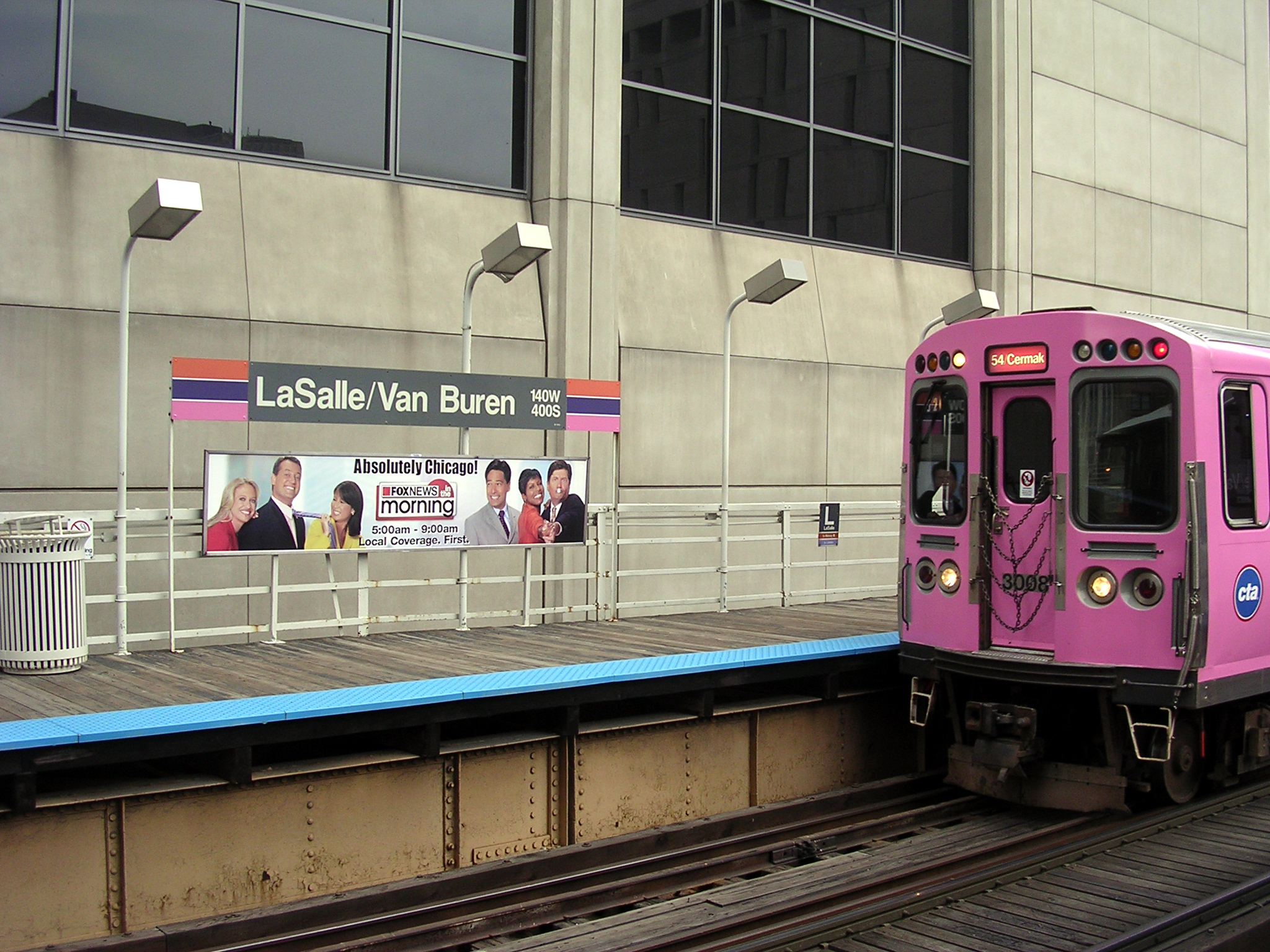
"L" train wrapped in pink to mark the start of the Pink Line trial service

==== 2000–2010 ====
During the 2000s and 2010s, the CTA has completed several renovation and new construction projects.

Pink Line service began on June 25, 2006, though it did not include any new tracks or stations. The Pink Line travels over what was formerly a branch of the Blue Line from the 54th/Cermak terminal in Cicero to the Polk station in Chicago. Pink Line trains then proceed via the Paulina Connector to the Lake Street branch of the Green Line and then clockwise around the Loop elevated via Lake-Wabash-Van Buren-Wells. Douglas trains used the same route between April 4, 1954, and June 22, 1958, after the old Garfield Park "L" line was demolished to make way for the Eisenhower Expressway. The new route, which serves 22 stations, offered more frequent service for riders on both the Congress and Douglas branches. Pink Line trains could be scheduled independently of Blue Line trains, and ran more frequently than the Douglas branch of the Blue Line did.

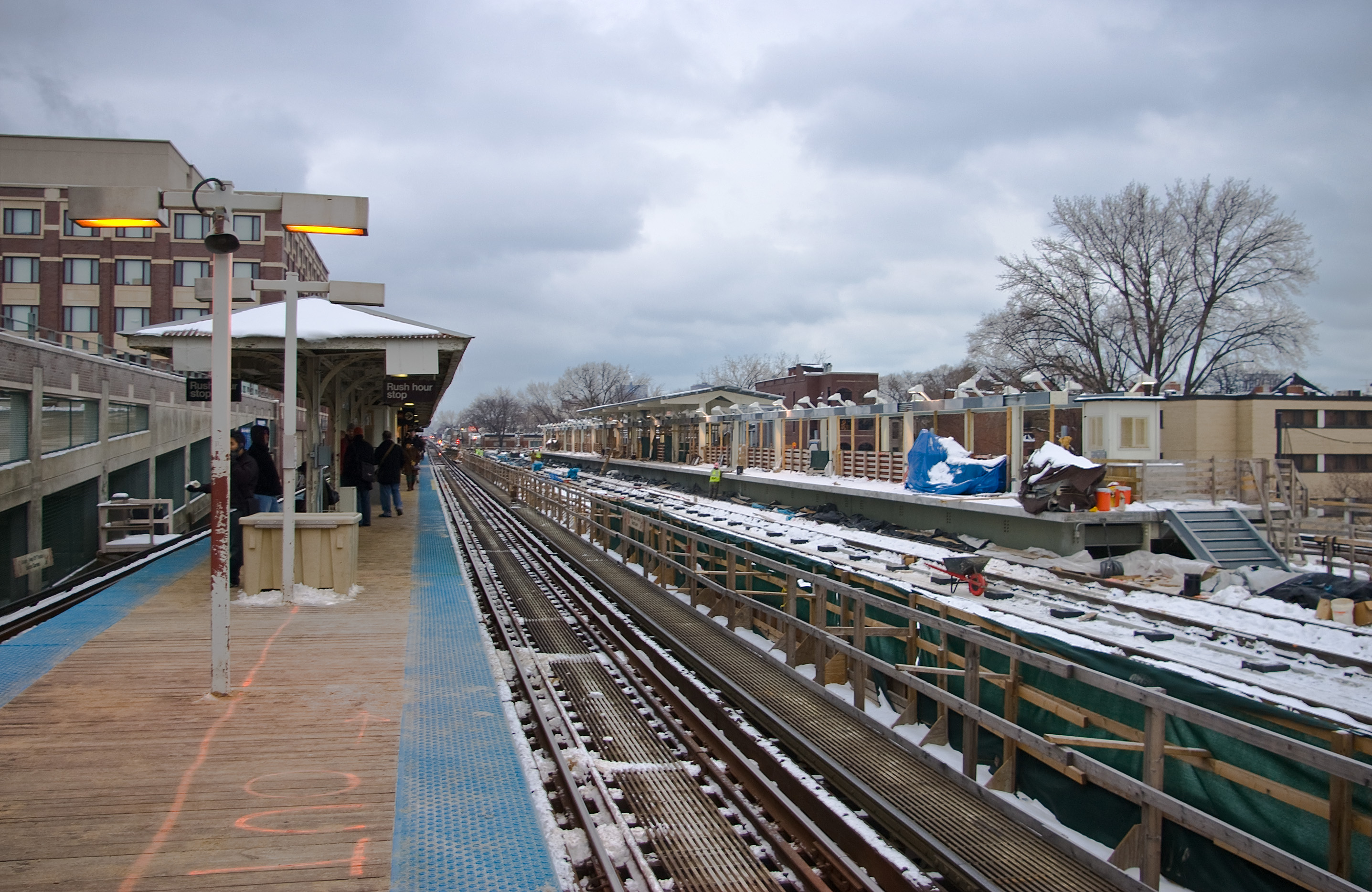
Fullerton station on the North Side for the Red, Brown, and Purple Lines, midway through reconstruction in December 2007

In late 2007, trains were forced to operate at reduced speed over more than 22% of the system due to deteriorated track, structure, and other problems. By October 2008, system-wide slow zones had been reduced to 9.1% and by January 2010, total slow zones were reduced to 6.3%. CTA's Slow Zone Elimination Project is an ongoing effort to restore track work to conditions where trains no longer have to reduce speeds through deteriorating areas. The Loop received track work in 2012–2013. The Purple Line in Evanston received track work and viaduct replacement in 2011–2013. The Green Line Ashland branch received track work in 2013, prior to the Red Line Dan Ryan branch reconstruction.

The Brown Line Capacity Expansion Project enabled CTA to run eight-car trains on the Brown Line, and rebuilt stations to modern standards, including accessibility. Before the project, Brown Line platforms could only accommodate six-car trains, and increasing ridership led to uncomfortably crowded trains. After several years of construction, eight-car trains began to run at rush hour on the Brown Line in April 2008. The project was completed in December 2009, on time and on budget, with only minor punch list work remaining. The project's total cost was expected to be around $530 million.

==== 2010–present ====
While various mayors of Chicago had recognized the importance of reliable public transit, Rahm Emanuel received credit for making improving service a top priority. In addition to local funding, he managed to secure federal dollars by lobbying.

One of the largest reconstruction projects in the CTA's history, at a cost of $425 million, was the Red Line South reconstruction project. From May 19, 2013, through October 20, 2013, the project closed and rebuilt the entire Dan Ryan branch—replacing and rebuilding all the tracks, ties, ballast and drainage systems—from Cermak-Chinatown to 95th/Dan Ryan. The station work involved renewing and improving eight stations, including new paint and lights, bus bridge improvements, new elevators at the Garfield, 63rd, and 87th stations and new roofs and canopies at some stations. "We are looking forward to providing our south Red Line customers with improved stations that are cleaner, brighter and better than they have been in years," said CTA President Forrest Claypool. Shutting down a portion of the railway instead of relegating work to the weekends enabled the project to be completed in months rather than years.

In 2014, the CTA initiated station and track upgrades on the Blue Line between Grand and O'Hare. This $492 million project has modernized stations (some of which were originally built in 1895), rebuilt tracks, replaced station platforms, upgraded water utilities, installed public art, and improved access to some stations (by adding elevators). This project, nearing completion as of 2022, is expected to cut travel time between the Loop and O'Hare by ten minutes.

In late 2015, extensive 4G wireless coverage was added to both Blue and Red Line subways, with the $32.5 million installation cost paid for by T-Mobile, Sprint, AT&T, and Verizon. Upon the project's completion, Chicago became the largest American city with 4G Internet service in all of its subways and tunnels, a total of 22 miles (35 km). Besides adding to passenger convenience, it also improved security by allowing CTA personnel and first responders to communicate more easily in case of an emergency.

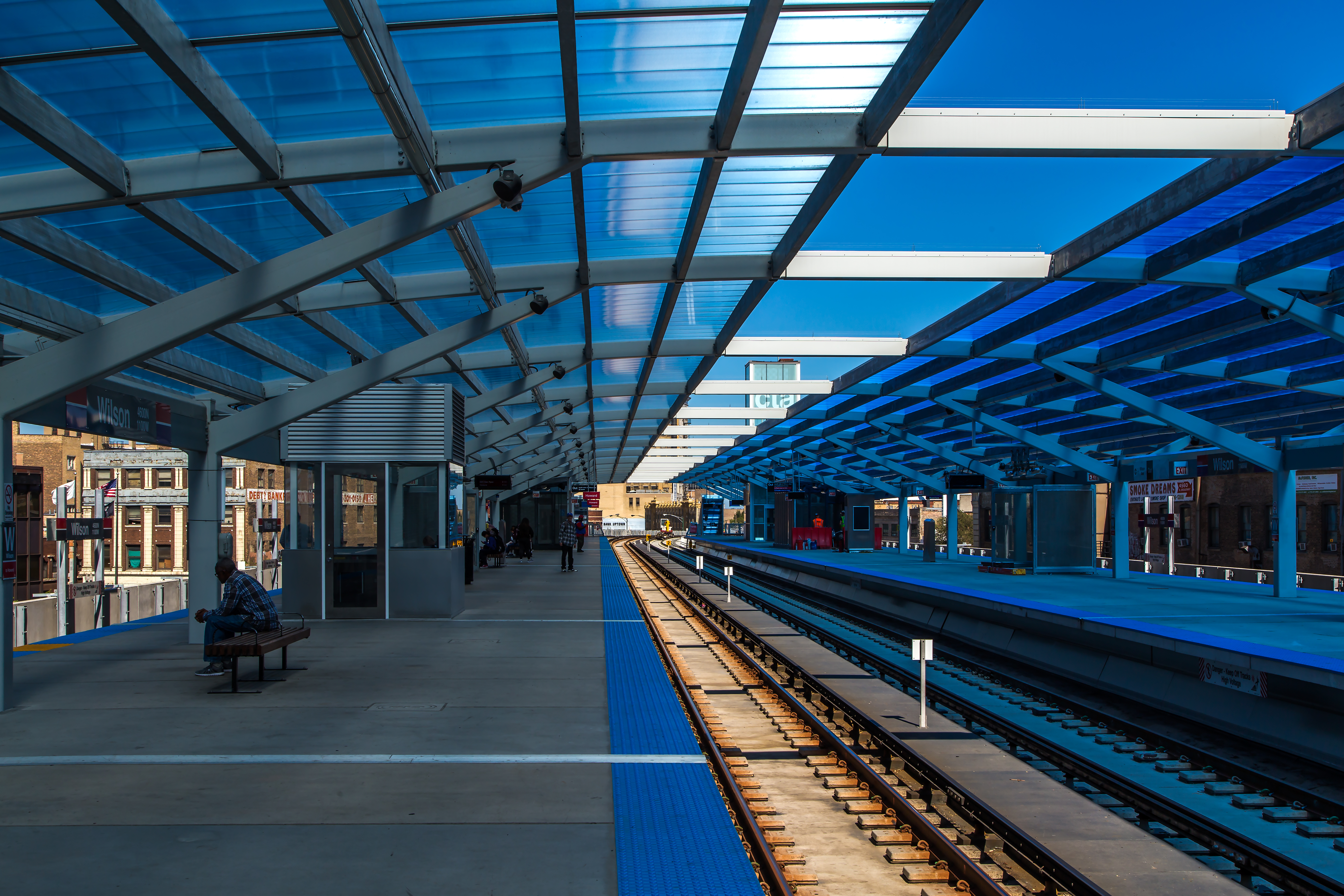
The newly rebuilt Wilson Station, September 2017

The new Wilson Station officially reopened in October 2017. The century-old station now includes accessible elevators, escalators, new security cameras, three entrances, wider stairwells, additional turnstiles, larger platforms, new lights and signage, as well as bus and train trackers.

FastTracks is a program intended to address the slow zones and to make train rides smoother and more reliable. In order to achieve this, crews would replace worn tracks, rail ties, and ballasts. An upgraded power system along the O'Hare Blue Line branch would enable more trains to operate during peak periods. The Blue, Brown, Green, and Red lines would be worked on. This program was set to begin in early 2018 and would continue through 2021. Funding for this $179 million project comes from a fee increase imposed on mobile app–based vehicle for hire companies in Chicago, the first of its kind in the country. In Mayor Emanuel's 2018 budget proposal, the fee went from 52 cents to 67 cents per trip. First introduced in 2015, this fee rose by another five cents in 2019.

In December 2018, The CTA Board approved $2.1 billion worth of contracts for the modernization of the Red and Purple Lines. The largest and most expensive in CTA history, this project includes the reconstruction of the junction between the Brown Line and Red/Purple line into a flying junction to reduce delays, and the reconstruction of the Lawrence, Argyle, Berwyn, and Bryn Mawr stations. Construction of the project began on October 2, 2019, and was completed on July 20, 2025. $100 million in federal funding for the reconstruction of the Red Line was approved September 2019. In the final days of the Barack Obama administration, the federal government agreed to provide $957 million in funding in total; the rest would come from a tax hike on property owners who lived within 0.5 miles (800 m) of the Red Line.

Google announced in November 2024 that it would pay for the redesign of the Clark/Lake station in a project related to the company's new Chicago headquarters at the former Thompson Center.

The Chicago Department of Transportation (CDOT) announced in December 2025 that the State/Lake station would close on January 5 for demolition. The station is to be rebuilt with greater accessibility, wider platforms, a continuous canopy, a pedestrian flyover bridge by 2029. The project is estimated to cost $444 million.

On September 1, 2026, the CTA's parent agency, the former Regional Transportation Authority (RTA), was replaced by the new Northern Illinois Transit Authority (NITA).

== Operations ==
As of 2014, Chicago "L" trains run over a total of 224.1 miles (360.7 km) of track.

=== Ridership ===
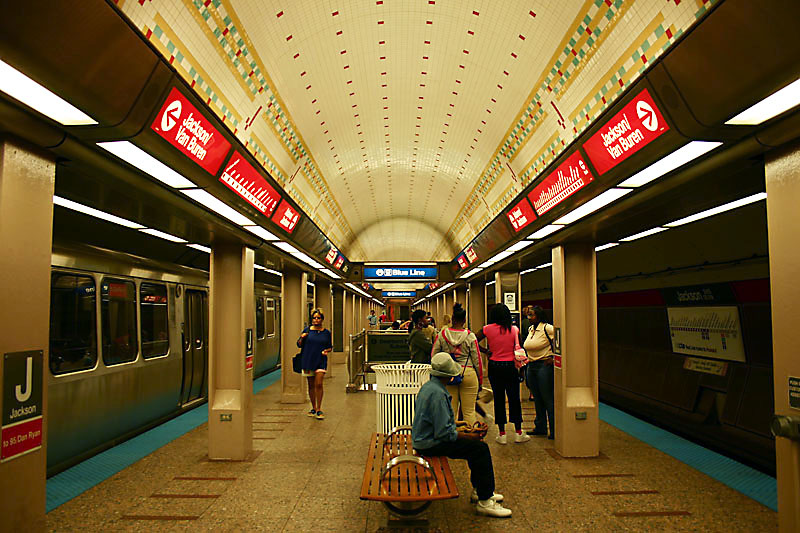
The Jackson/State subway stop on the Red Line (2004)

Ridership has been growing steadily after the CTA takeover despite declining mass transit usage nationwide, with an average of 594,000 riders boarding each weekday in 1960 and 759,866 in 2016 (or 47% of all CTA rides). Due to the Loop Flood in April 1992, ridership was at 418,000 that year because CTA was forced to suspend operation for several weeks in both the State and Dearborn subways, used by the most heavily traveled lines.

Growing ridership has not been uniformly distributed. Use of North Side lines is heavy and continues to grow, while that of West Side and South Side lines tend to remain stable. Ridership on the North Side Brown Line, for instance, has increased 83% since 1979, necessitating a station reconstruction project to accommodate longer trains.

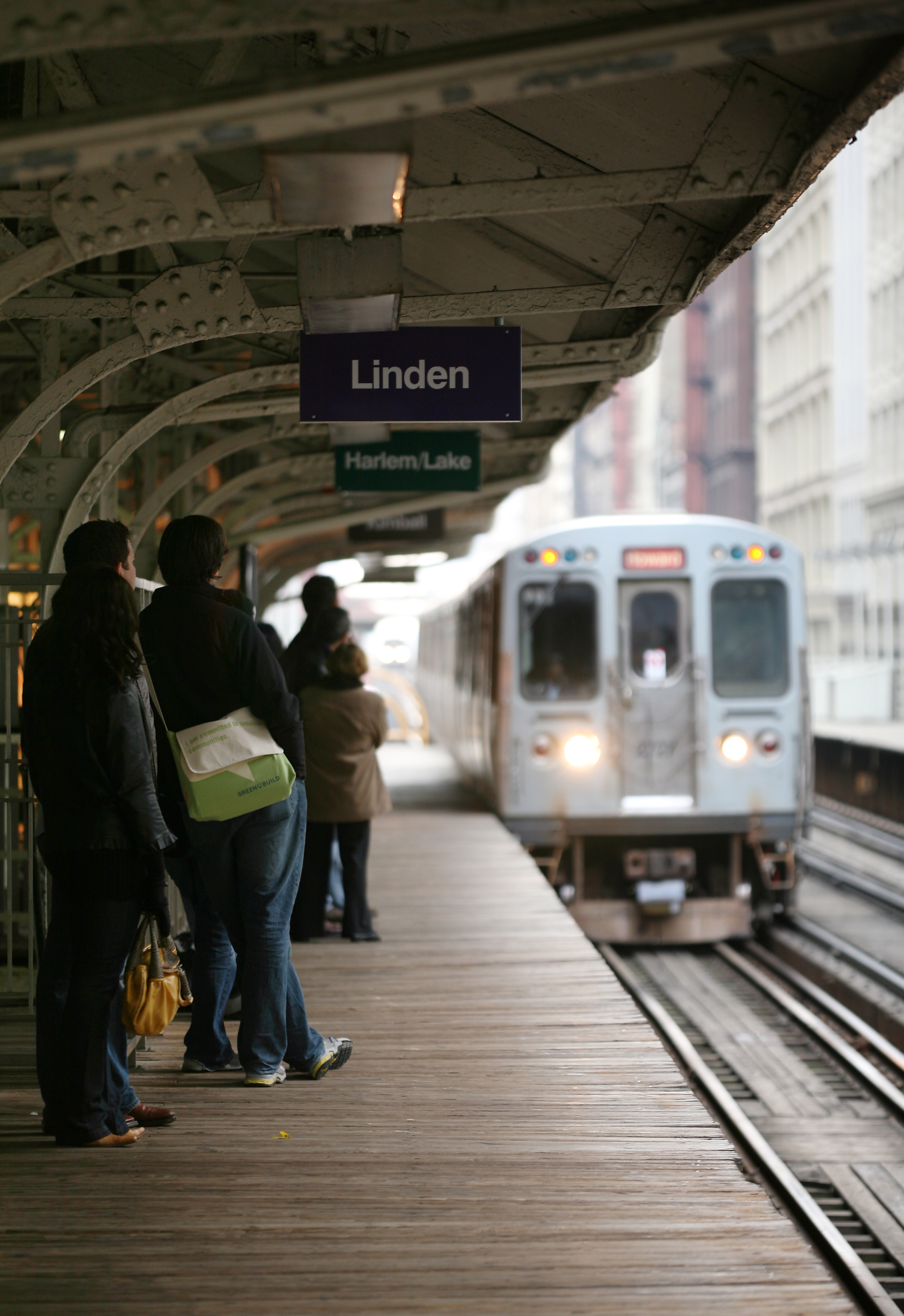
A Red Line train pulls into Adams/Wabash, being rerouted over elevated tracks due to construction in the State Street subway (2007)

Annual traffic on the Howard branch of the Red Line, which reached 38.7 million in 2010 and 40.9 million in 2011, has exceeded the 1927 prewar peak of 38.5 million. The section of the Blue Line between the Loop and Logan Square, which serves once-neglected but now bustling neighborhoods such as Wicker Park, Bucktown, and Palmer Square, has seen a 54% increase in weekday riders since 1992. On the other hand, weekday ridership on the South Side portion of the Green Line, which closed for two years for reconstruction from January 1994 to May 1996, was 50,400 in 1978 but only 13,000 in 2006.

Boardings at the 95th/Dan Ryan stop on the Red Line, though still among the system's busiest at 11,100 riders per weekday as of February 2015, are less than half the peak volume in the 1980s. In 1976, three North Side "L" branches – what were then known as the Howard, Milwaukee, and Ravenswood lines − accounted for 42% of non-downtown boardings. Today (with the help of the Blue Line extension to O'Hare), they account for 58%.

The North Side, which has historically been the highest density area of the city, reflects the Chicago building boom between 2000 and 2010, which has focused primarily on North Side neighborhoods and downtown. It may ease somewhat in the wake of the current high level of residential construction along the south lakefront. For example, ridership at the linked Roosevelt stops on the Green, Orange, and Red Lines, (Note: The Roosevelt elevated stop on the Orange and Green Lines, which opened in 1994, is connected to the Roosevelt Red Line subway stop by a pedestrian passage, so CTA reports the two as a single station. Ridership in 1992 is for the subway stop only.) which serve the burgeoning South Loop neighborhood, has tripled since 1992, with an average of 8,000 boardings per weekday.

Patronage at the Cermak-Chinatown stop on the Red Line, with 4,000 weekday boardings, is at the highest level since the station opened in 1969. The 2003 Chicago Central Area Plan proposed construction of a Green Line station at Cermak, between Chinatown and the McCormick Place convention center, in expectation of continued density growth in the vicinity. This station opened in 2015.

=== Service ===
Currently, the Red Line and the Blue Line provide 24-hour service, while all other lines operate from early morning to late night. Prior to 1998, the Green Line, the Purple Line, and the Douglas branch of the Blue Line (now the Pink Line) also had 24-hour service. In the years of private ownership, the South Side Elevated Railroad (now the South Side Elevated portion of the Green Line) provided 24-hour service, a major advantage when compared to Chicago's cable railroads, which required daily overnight shutdown for cable maintenance. There are plans to add 24-hour service to the Orange Line with some of the funding received from Senate Bill 2111.

=== Fares ===
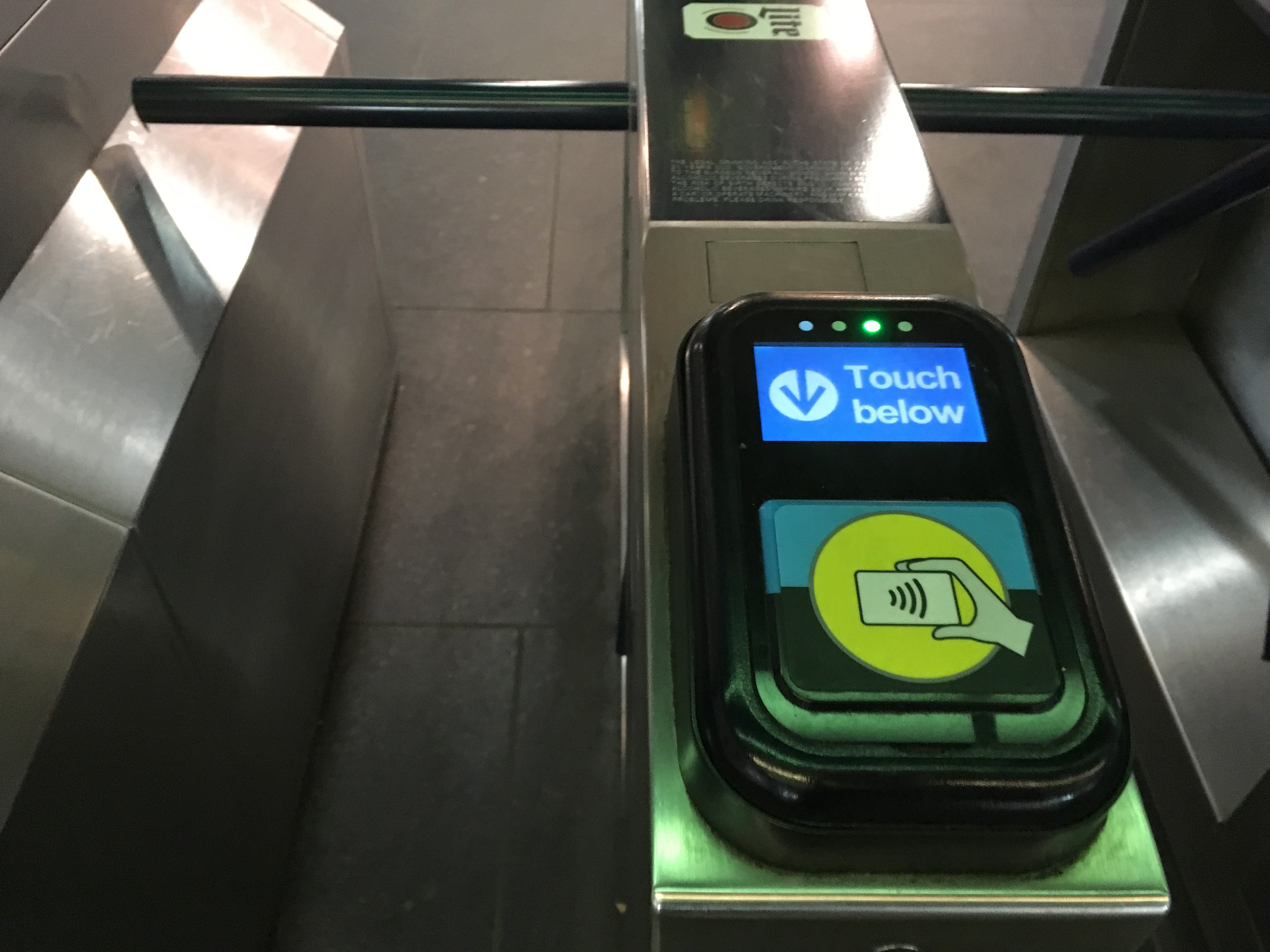
A touchless Ventra smart card reader on a turnstile (2017)

In 2013, the CTA introduced a new fare payment system called Ventra. Ventra enables passengers to purchase individual tickets, passes, or transit value online, by smart phone, or at participating retail locations. Ventra also works with CTA buses, Pace (suburban buses), and Metra (commuter rail). Payment by a smartphone app, the Ventra app, or by a contactless bankcard is possible.

As of 2018, the "L" uses a flat fare of $2.50 for almost the entire system, the only exception being O'Hare International Airport on the Blue Line, at which passengers entering the station are charged a higher fare of $5.00 (passengers leaving the system at this station are not charged this higher fare). The higher fare is being charged for what the CTA considers "premium-level" service to O'Hare. Use of the Midway International Airport station does not require this higher fare; it only requires the $2.50 regular fare.

In 2013, the higher charge at O'Hare has been the source of some controversy, because of the CTA's plan to eliminate the exemption from the premium fare for airport workers, Transportation Security Administration workers, and airline workers. After protests from those groups, the CTA extended the exemptions for six months.

=== Fare control ===
The CTA uses fare gates to verify that passengers have paid their fare. As of 2026, most gates at staffed stations use a rotating single bar that only rotates when you pay your fare. Some entrances that are unstaffed use high barrier fare gates, which are much harder to open making fare evasion levels go down. In order to comply with the Americans with Disabilities Act of 1990, the CTA has wider gates that allow wheelchairs and suitcases to pass through easily. Such gates were updated in 2023 to make them taller and improve the locking mechanism, further discouraging fare evasion. In March 2026, the CTA announced in response to their funding being cut by the FTA that they would install more high barrier fare gates at stations with high levels of fare evasion.

== Lines ==
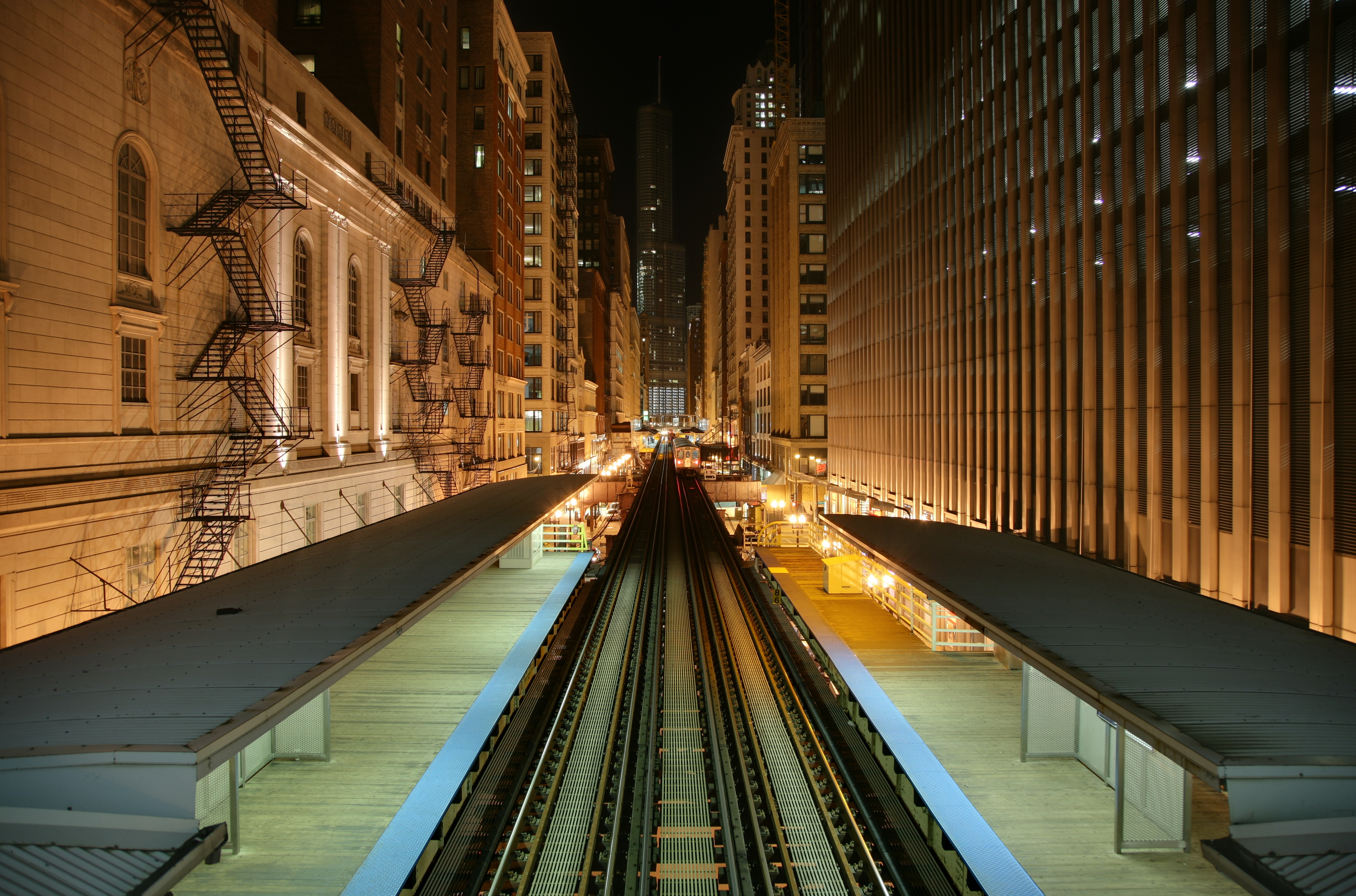
A view of the Chicago "L" in the Loop (2009)

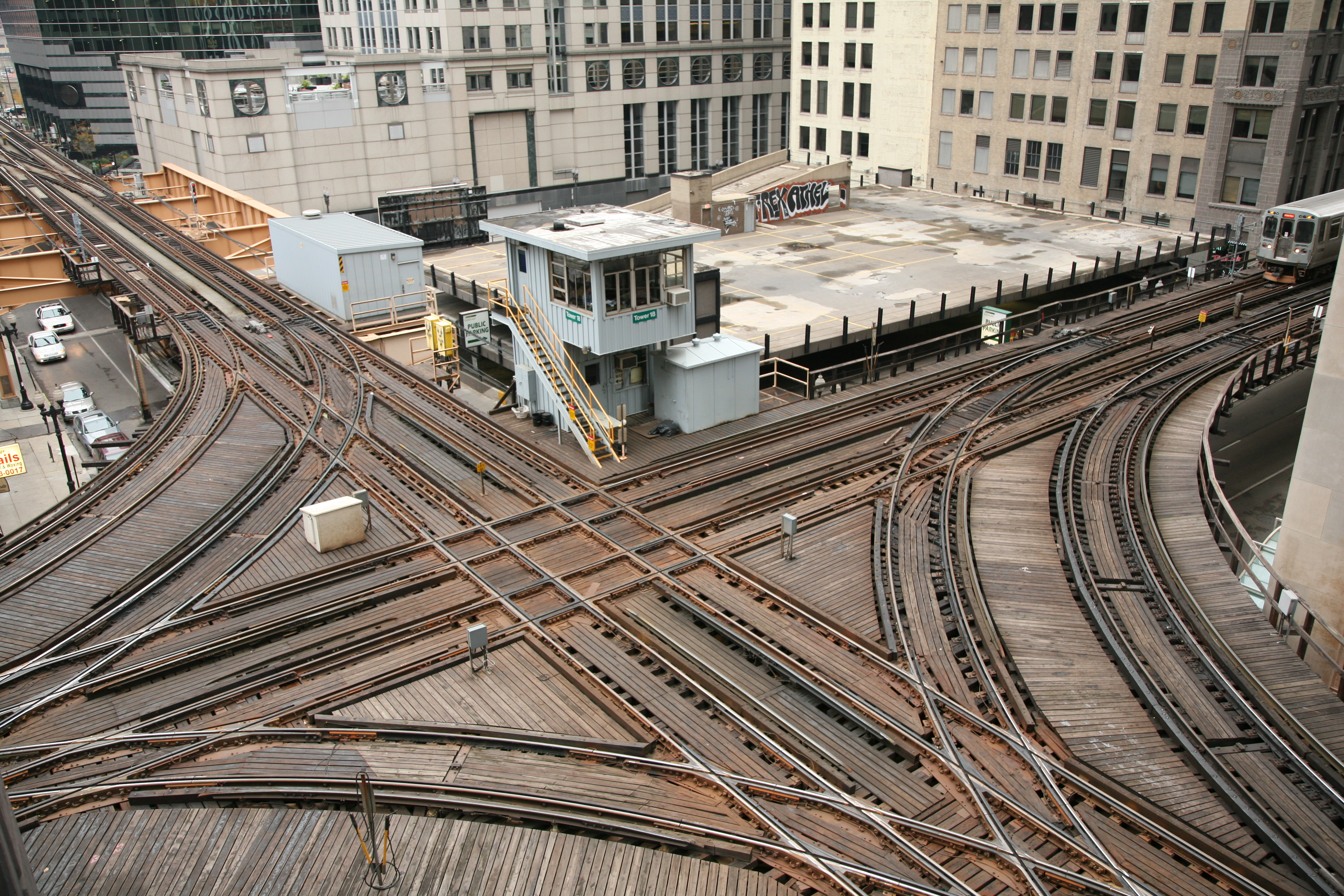
Chicago Transit Authority control tower 18 guides elevated north and southbound Purple and Brown lines intersecting with east and westbound Pink and Green lines and the looping Orange line above the Wells and Lake street intersection in the loop (2007).

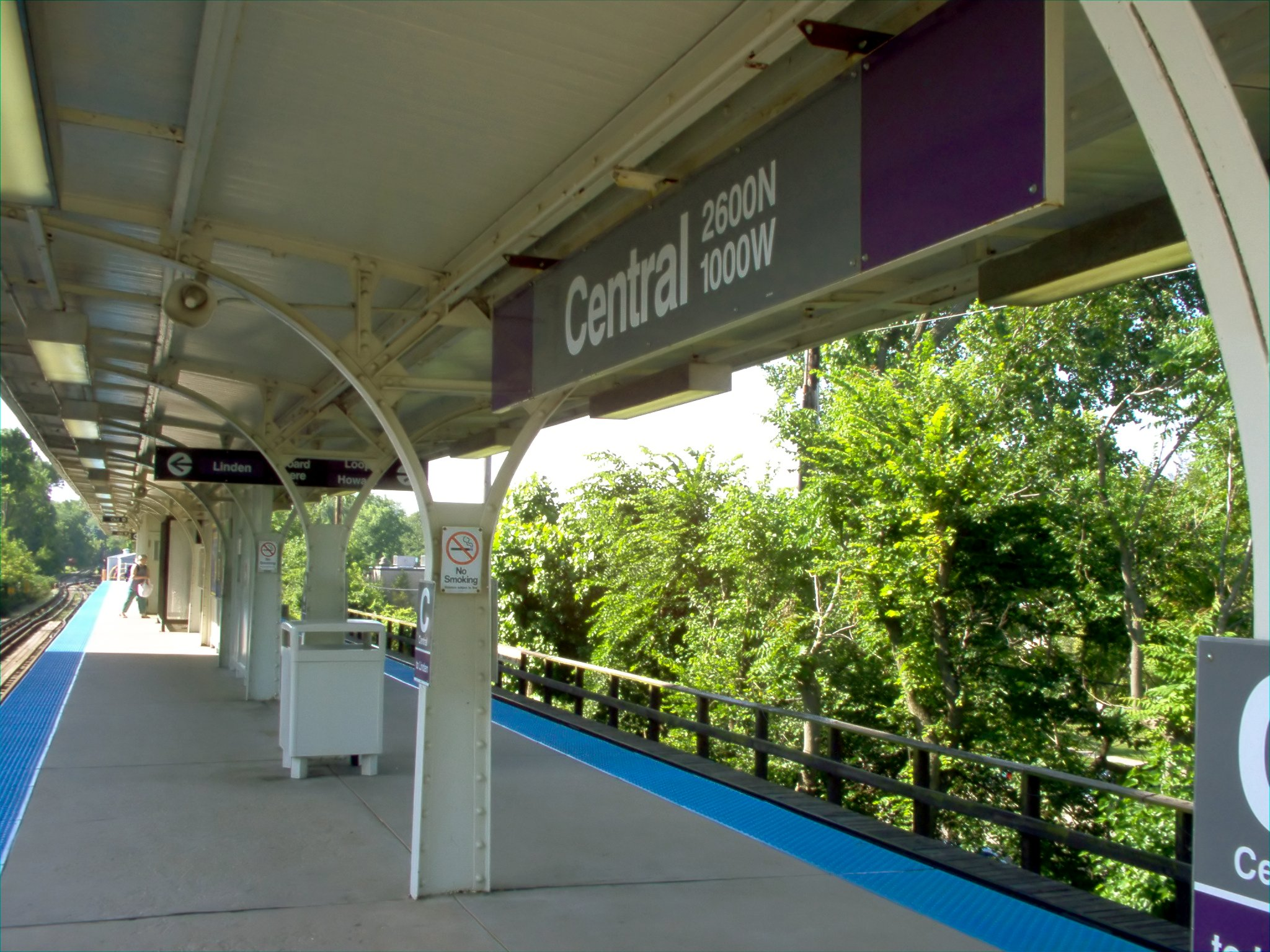
The Purple Line serves Evanston and Wilmette with weekday rush-hour express service to downtown Chicago (2006).

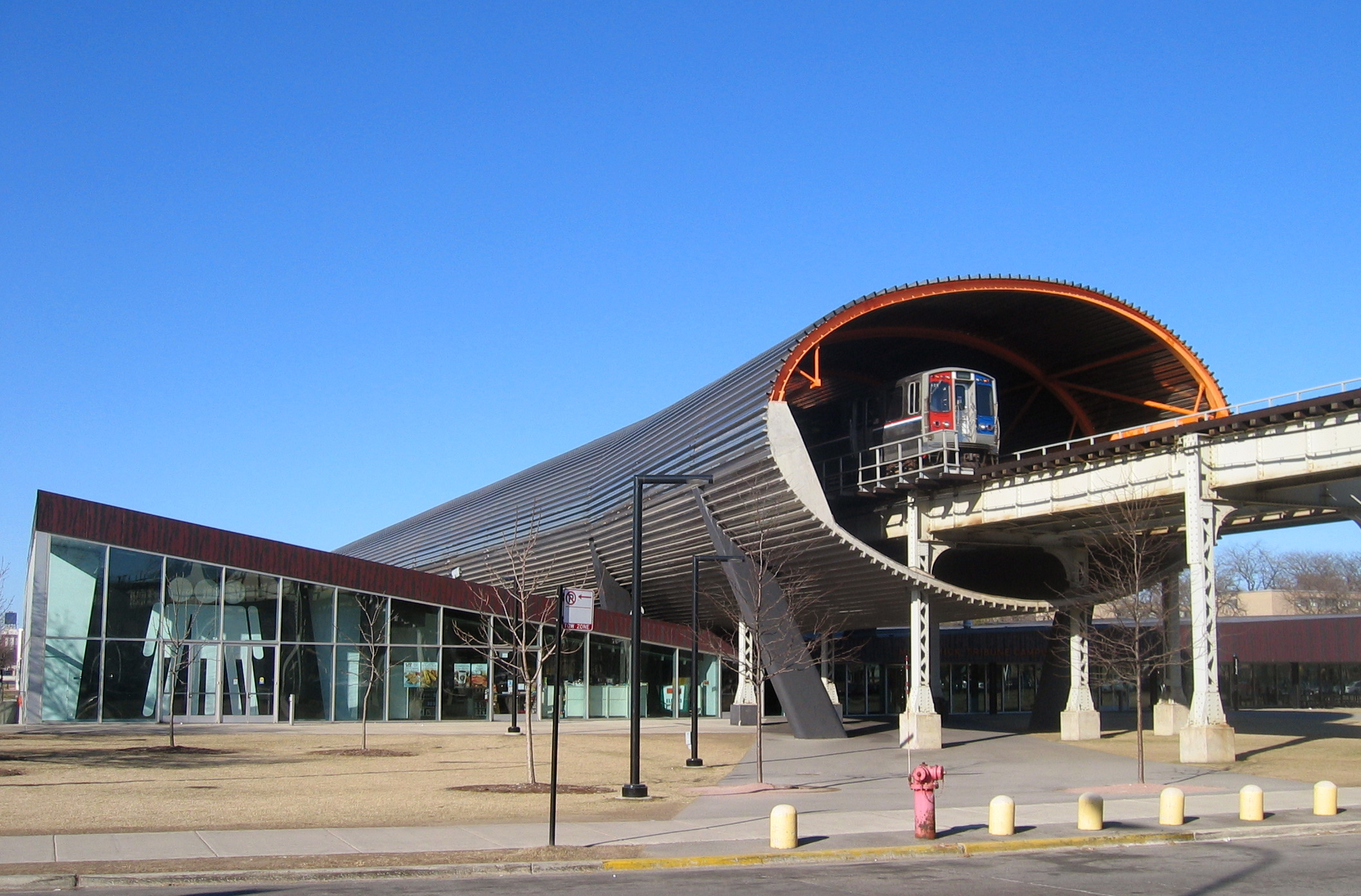
A south-bound Green Line train travels through a tube near the McCormick Tribune Campus Center of the Illinois Institute of Technology in Bronzeville (2006)

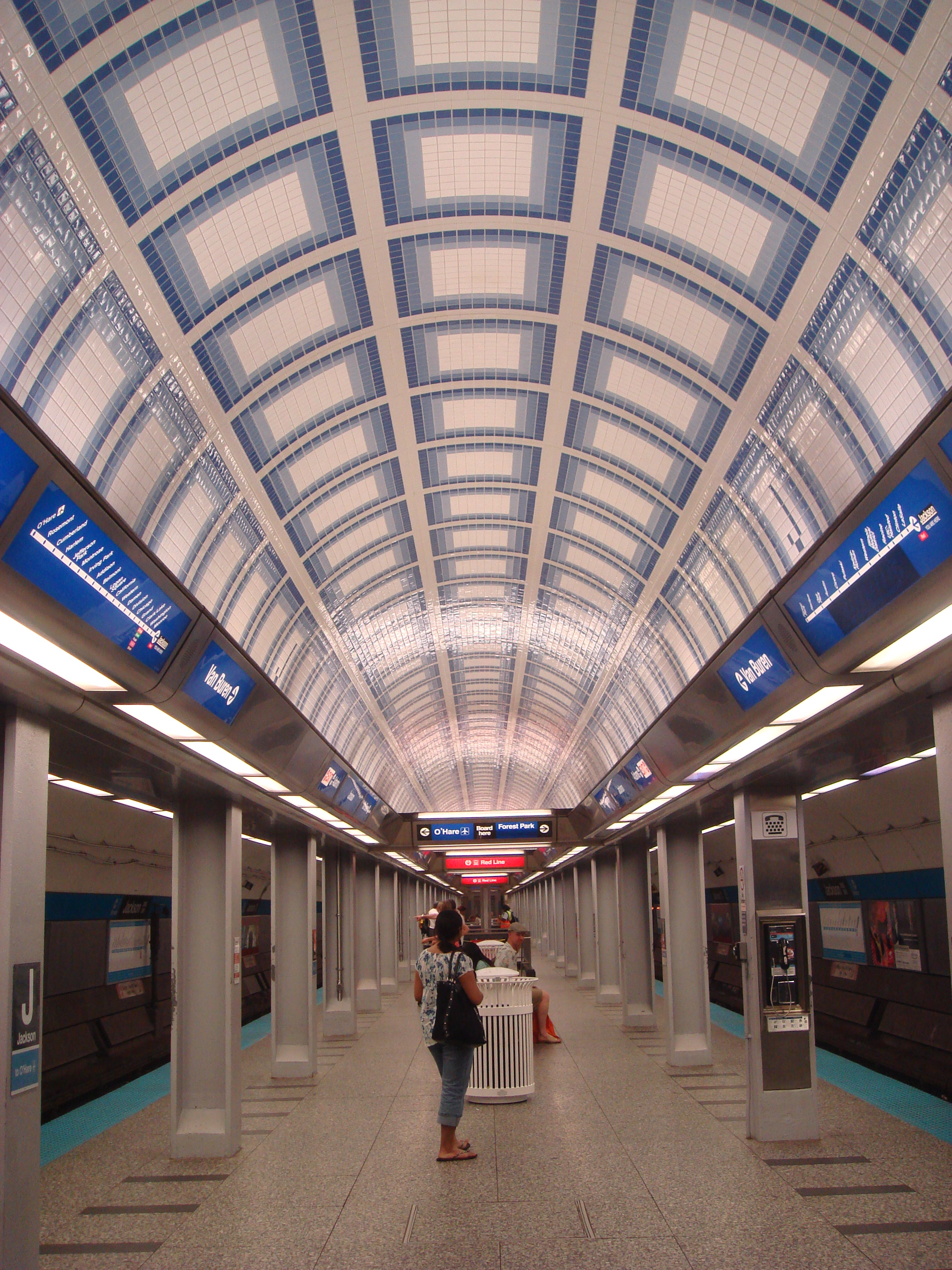
Jackson Station on the Blue Line (2008)

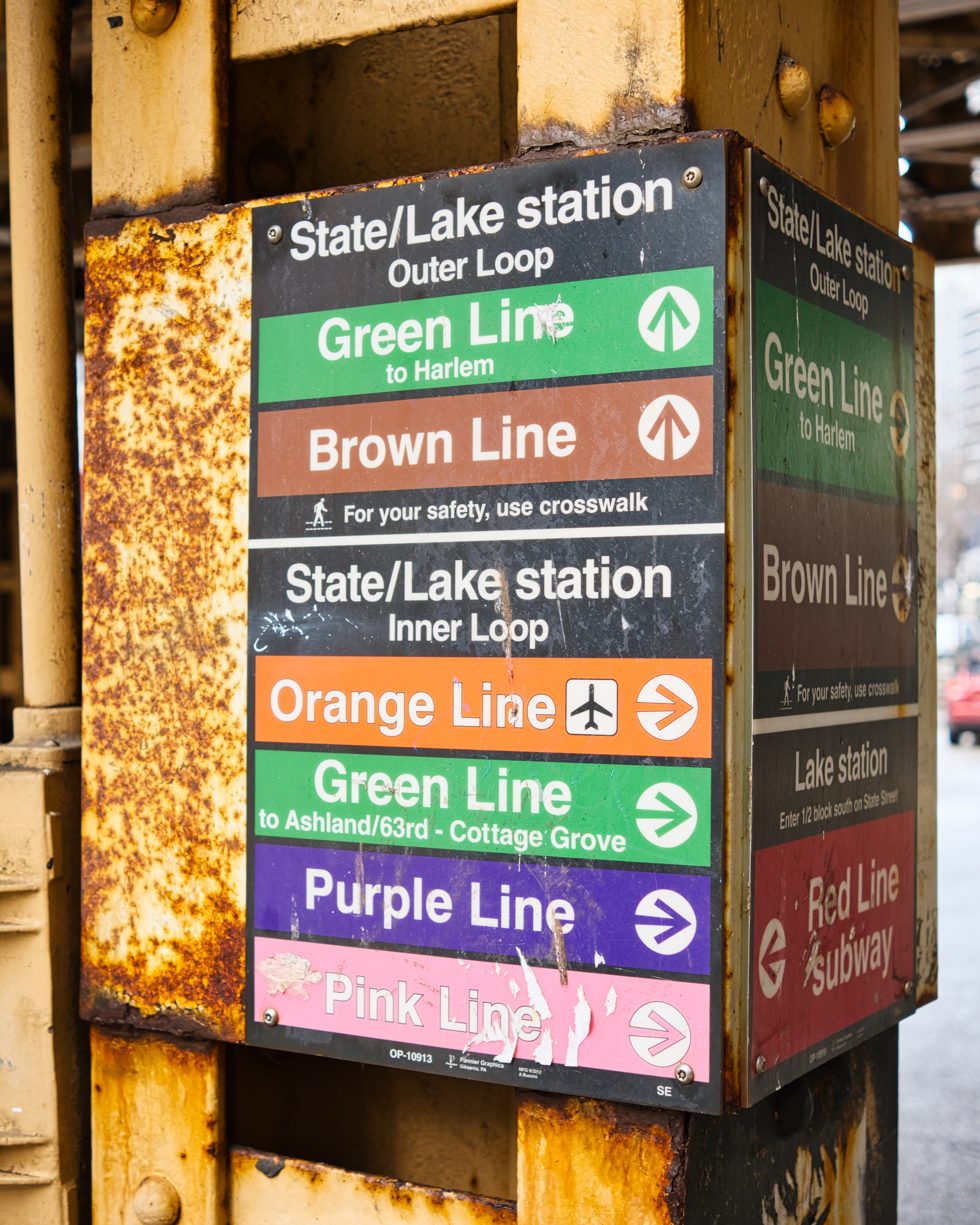
Sign at the State/Lake station (2022)

Since 1993, "L" lines have been officially identified by color, although older route names survive to some extent in CTA publications and popular usage to distinguish branches of longer lines. Stations are found throughout Chicago, as well as in the suburbs of Forest Park, Oak Park, Evanston, Wilmette, Cicero, Rosemont, and Skokie.

Blue Line, consisting of the O'Hare, Milwaukee–Dearborn subway, and Congress branches
The Blue Line extends from O'Hare International Airport through the Loop via the Milwaukee-Dearborn subway to the West Side. Trains travel to Des Plaines Avenue in Forest Park via the Eisenhower Expressway median. The route from O'Hare to Forest Park is 26.93 miles (43 km) long, with 33 stations. Until 1970, the northern section of the Blue Line terminated at Logan Square. During that time, the line was called the Milwaukee route after Milwaukee Avenue, which runs parallel to it; in that year, service was extended to Jefferson Park via the Kennedy Expressway median, and in 1984 to O'Hare. The Blue Line is the second-busiest, with 176,120 weekday boardings. It operates 24 hours a day, 7 days a week.
Brown Line or Ravenswood branch
The Brown Line follows an 11.4-mile (18 km) route, between the Kimball terminal in Albany Park and the Loop in downtown Chicago. In 2013, the Brown Line had an average weekday ridership of 108,529.
Green Line, consisting of the Lake Street Elevated, South Side Elevated, Ashland, and East 63rd branches
A completely elevated route utilizing the system's oldest segments (dating back to 1892), the Green Line extends 20.8 miles (33.5 km) with 31 stations between Forest Park and Oak Park (Harlem/Lake), through The Loop, to the South Side. South of the Garfield station the line splits into two branches, with trains terminating at Ashland/63rd in West Englewood and terminating at Cottage Grove/63rd in Woodlawn. The East 63rd branch formerly extended to Jackson Park, but the portion of the line east of Cottage Grove, which ran above 63rd Street, was demolished in the 1980s and 1997 due to structural problems and was never rebuilt due to community demands. The average number of weekday boardings in 2013 was 68,230.
Orange Line or Midway Line
The 13-mile (21 km) long Orange Line was constructed from 1987 until 1993 on existing railroad embankments and new concrete and steel elevated structure. It runs from a station adjacent to Midway International Airport on the Southwest Side to The Loop in downtown Chicago. Average weekday ridership in 2013 was 58,765.
Pink Line consisting of the Cermak branch and Paulina connector
The Pink Line is an 11.2-mile (18 km) rerouting of former Blue Line branch trains from 54th/Cermak in Cicero via the previously non-revenue Paulina Connector and the Green Line on Lake Street to the Loop. Its average weekday ridership in 2013 was 31,572. The branch formerly ran to Oak Park Avenue in Berwyn, 2.1 miles (3.4 km) west of its current terminal. In 1952, service on the portion of the line west of 54th Avenue closed and, over the next decade, the stations and tracks were demolished. The street level right-of-way is used to this day as parking, locally known as the " 'L' Strip".
Purple Line, consisting of the Evanston Shuttle and Evanston Express
The Purple Line is a 3.9-mile (6 km) branch serving north suburban Evanston and Wilmette with express service to the Loop during weekday rush hours. The local service operates from the Linden terminal in Wilmette through Evanston to the Howard terminal on the north side of Chicago where it connects with the Red and Yellow lines. The weekday rush-hour express service continues from Howard to the Loop, running nonstop on the four-track line used by the Red Line to Wilson station, then serving Belmont station, followed by all Brown Line stops to the Loop. Its 2013 average weekday ridership was 42,673 passenger boardings. The stops from Belmont to Chicago Avenue were added in the 1990s to relieve crowding on the Red and Brown lines. Its purple color is a reference to nearby Northwestern University, with four stops (Davis, Foster, Noyes, and Central) located just two blocks west of the university campus.
Red Line, consisting of the North Side main line, State Street subway, and Dan Ryan branch
The Red Line is the busiest route, with 234,232 passenger boardings on an average weekday in 2013. It includes 33 stations on its 26-mile (42 km) route, traveling from the Howard terminal on the city's north side, through downtown Chicago via the State Street subway, then down the Dan Ryan Expressway median to 95th/Dan Ryan on the South Side. Despite its length, the Red Line stops 5 miles (8.0 km) short of the city's southern border. An extension to 130th Street is currently being constructed. The Red Line is one of two lines operating 24 hours a day, seven days a week and is the only CTA "L" line that goes to both Wrigley Field and Rate Field, the homes of Chicago's Major League Baseball teams, the Chicago Cubs and Chicago White Sox. Rail cars are stored at the Howard Yard on the north end of the line and at the 98th Yard at the south end. A new yard near 120th Street will be built as part of the Red Line Extension (RLE) project.
Yellow Line, or Skokie Swift
The Yellow Line is a 4.7-mile (8 km) three-station line that runs from the Howard Street terminal to the Dempster–Skokie terminal in north suburban Skokie. The Yellow Line is the only "L" route that does not provide direct service to the Loop. This line was originally part of the North Shore Line's rail service, and was acquired by the CTA in the 1960s. The Yellow Line previously operated as a nonstop shuttle, until the downtown Skokie station Oakton–Skokie opened on April 30, 2012. Its average weekday ridership in 2013 was 6,338 passenger boardings.
The Loop
Brown, Green, Orange, Pink, and Purple Line Express trains serve downtown Chicago via the Loop elevated. The Loop's eight stations average 72,843 weekday boardings. The Orange Line, Purple Line and the Pink Line run clockwise; the Brown Line runs counter-clockwise. The Green Line runs in both directions through the north and east sides; the other four lines circle the Loop and return to their starting points. The Loop forms a rectangle roughly 0.4 miles (640 m) long east-to-west and 0.6 miles (970 m) long north-to-south. The Loop three-quarter union at Lake and Wells has been described in the Guinness Book of World Records as the world's busiest railroad crossing.

== Rolling stock ==
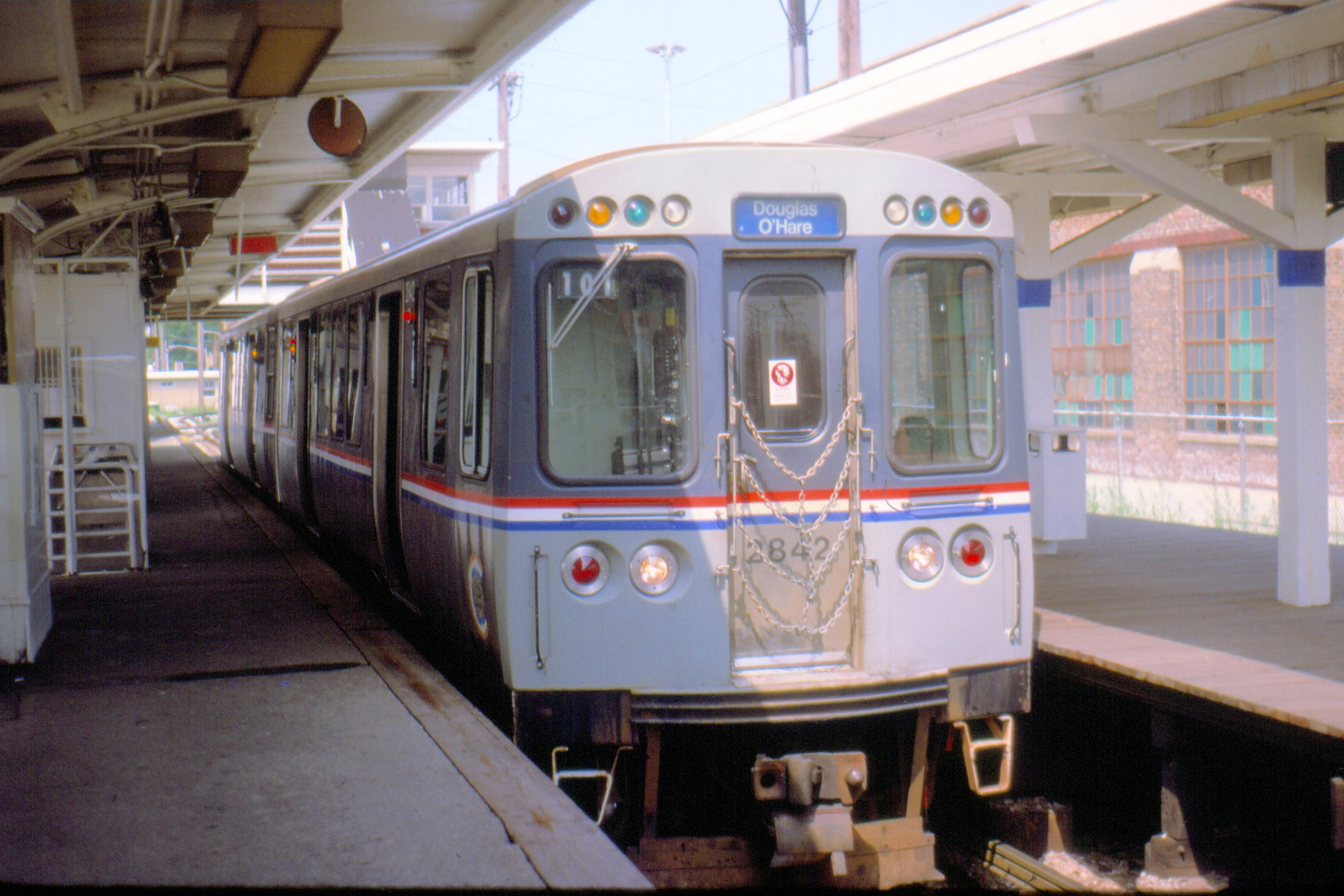
A 2600-series cars as-built at the Cicero-Berwyn Terminal on July 17, 1994

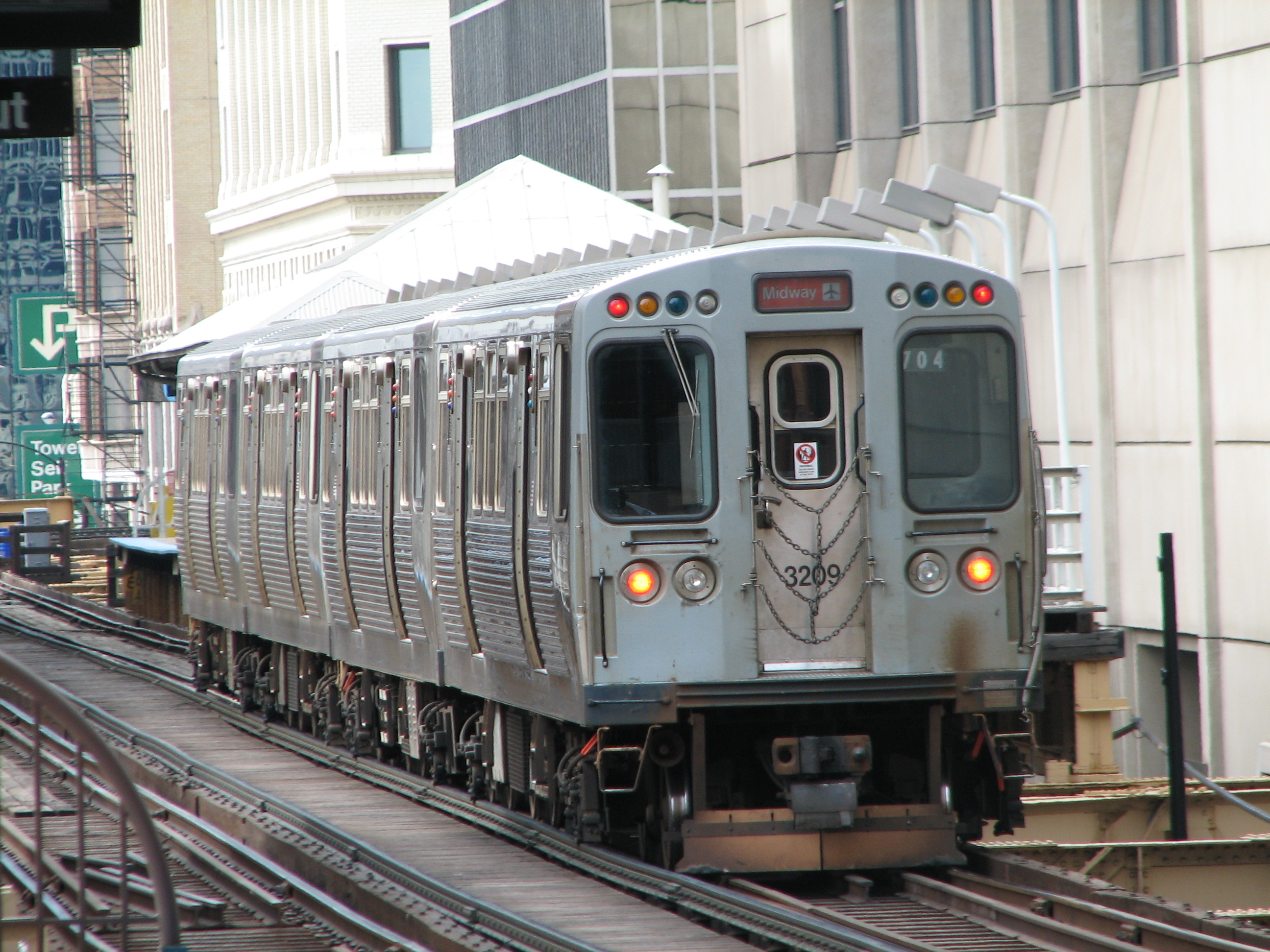
A 4-car train of 3200-series cars pulls into State/Lake (2006)

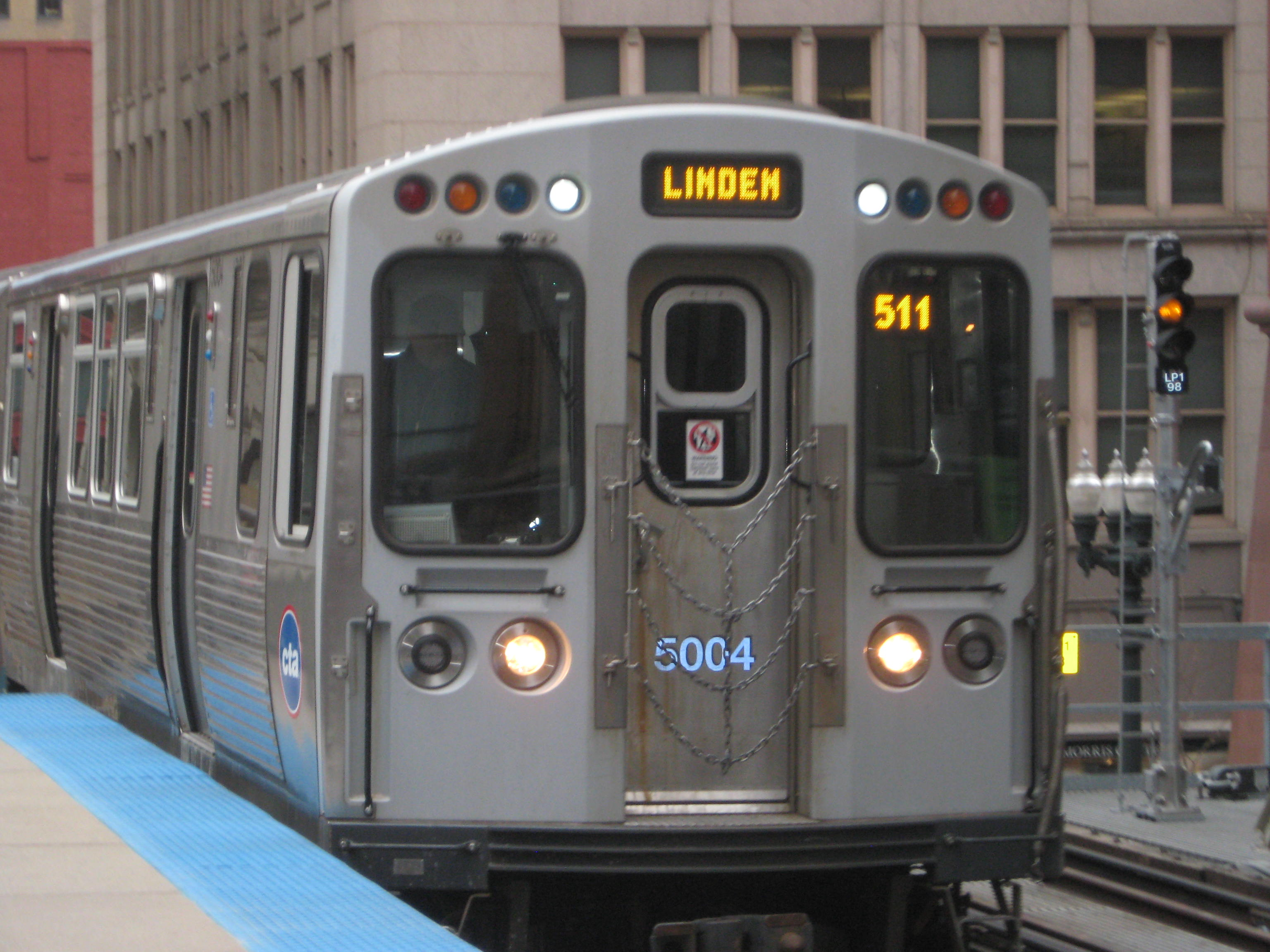
A 5000-series Purple Line train entering Harold Washington Library-State/Van Buren (2011)

The CTA operates over 1,350 "L" cars, divided among four series, all of which are semi-permanently coupled into married pairs. All cars on the system utilize 600-volt direct current power delivered through an uncovered third rail.

The 2600-series was built from 1981 until 1987 by the Budd Company of Philadelphia, Pennsylvania. After the completion of the order of the 2600-series cars, Budd changed its name to Transit America and ceased production of railcars. With 509 cars in operation, the 2600-series is the largest of the four series of "L" cars in operation. The cars were rebuilt by Alstom of Hornell, New York, from 1999 until 2002.

The 3200-series, was built from 1992 until 1994 by Morrison–Knudsen of Hornell, New York. These cars have fluted, stainless steel sides similar to the now-retired 2200-series.

The 5000-series train cars are equipped with AC propulsion; interior security cameras; aisle-facing seating, which allow for greater passenger capacity; LED destination signs, interior readouts, and interior maps; GPS; glow-in-the-dark evacuation signs; operator-controlled ventilation systems; among other features. AC propulsion allows for smoother acceleration, lower operational costs, less wear and tear, and greater energy efficiency. The AC propulsion can take advantage of regenerative braking, meaning the train returns excess energy to the third rail as it slows down. With the DC propulsion of the previous series, they utilize dynamic braking which converts the excess kinetic energy into heat within a resistor bank.

Next-generation train cars, the 7000-series, have been ordered and are beginning to enter service. Each 7000-series rail car will feature LEDs, 37 to 38 seats, and is a hybrid of the 3200-series and 5000-series. The design and arrangement of seats were modified to improve ergonomics and increase leg room. Enhanced air conditioning will circulate air more efficiently during hot summer days. Laser sensors above the doors will count the number of passengers, allowing the CTA to track passenger volumes and change its schedules accordingly. State-owned manufacturer CRRC Sifang America (China Rail Rolling Stock Corporation) won the contract, besting the other major competitor, Bombardier from Canada by $226 million. Concerns have been raised over possible malware, cyber attacks, and mass surveillance by the Chinese government. The computer and software components and the automatic train control system will be made by U.S. and Canadian firms. The cars are being built at a new CRRC Sifang America rail car manufacturing plant at 13535 South Torrence Avenue in Chicago's Hegewisch neighborhood. Production of the 7000-series cars commenced in June 2019. This is the first time in more than 50 years CTA rail cars are manufactured in Chicago. Ten cars in the 7000-series began testing revenue service on April 21, 2021. The base order is for 400 cars and will be used to replace the 2600-series cars. If the CTA ordered the additional 446 cars, they would also replace the 3200-series cars.

In May 2023, the CTA announced it has received $200 million funding from the Federal Transit Authority; this money will go towards the development of the 9000-series rail cars. The plan is to acquire up to 300 new train sets.

== Nickname ==
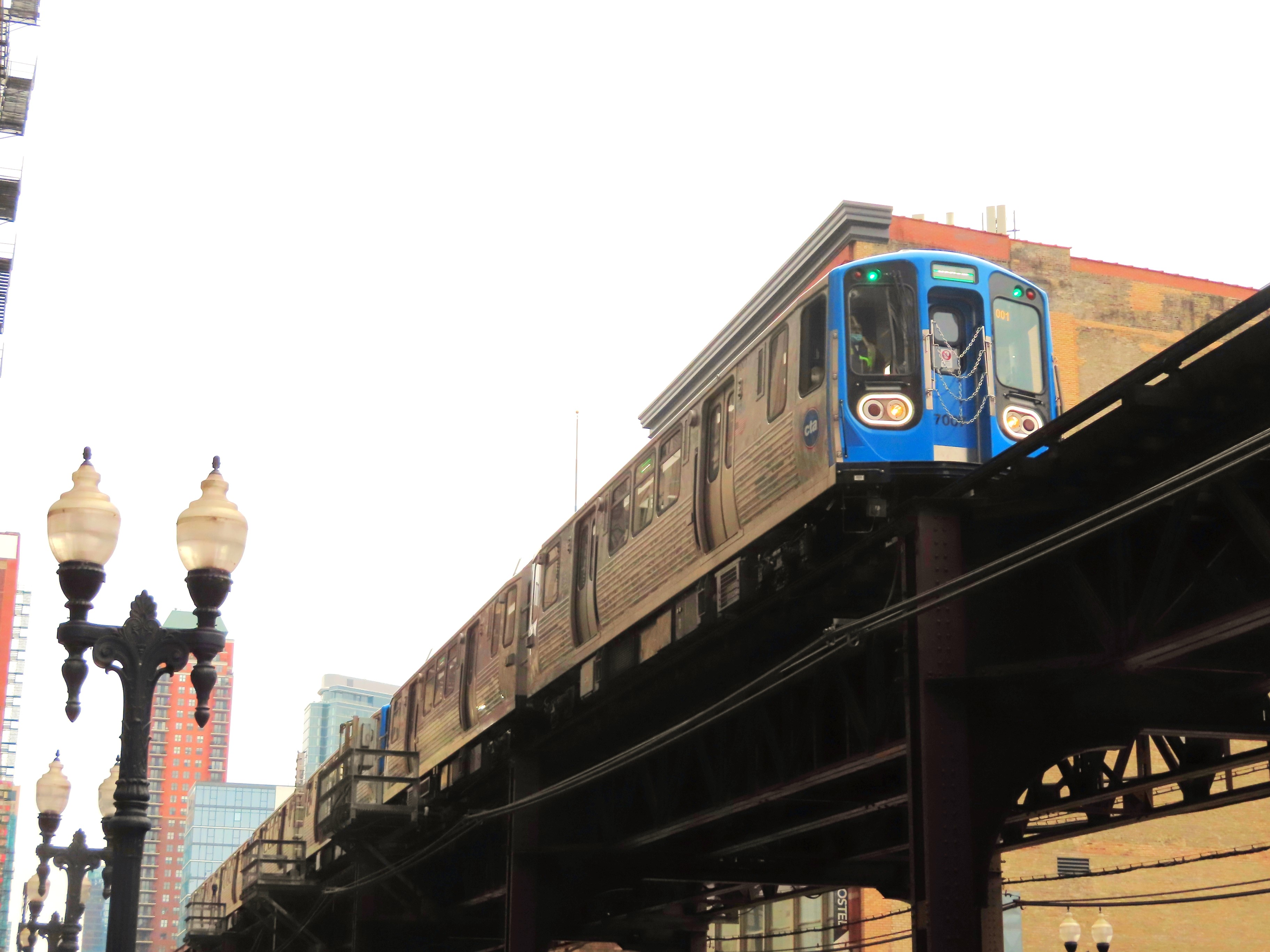
A 7000-series train being tested on the Green Line near Congress Street (2022)

Chicago's rapid-transit system is officially nicknamed the "L". This name for the CTA rail system applies to the whole system: its elevated, subway, at-grade, and open-cut segments. The use of the nickname dates from the earliest days of the elevated railroads. Newspapers of the late 1880s referred to proposed elevated railroads in Chicago as "'L' roads." The first route to be constructed, the Chicago and South Side Rapid Transit Railroad gained the nickname "Alley Elevated", or "Alley L" during its planning and construction, a term that was widely used by 1893, less than a year after the line opened.

In discussing various stylings of "Loop" and "L" in Destination Loop: The Story of Rapid Transit Railroading in and around Chicago (1982), author Brian J. Cudahy quotes a passage from The Neon Wilderness (1947) by Chicago author Nelson Algren: "beneath the curved steel of the El, beneath the endless ties." Cudahy then comments, "Note that in the quotation above ... it says 'El' to mean 'elevated rapid transit railroad.' We trust that this usage can be ascribed to a publisher's editor in New York or some other east coast city; in Chicago the same expression is routinely rendered 'L'."

As used by CTA, the name is rendered as the capital letter 'L', in single quotation marks. "L" (with double quotation marks) was often used by CTA predecessors such as the Chicago Rapid Transit Company; however, the CTA uses single quotation marks (') on some printed materials and signs rather than double. In Chicago, the term "subway" only applies to the State Street and Milwaukee–Dearborn subways and is not applied to the system as a whole, unlike in New York City where both the elevated and underground portions make up the New York City Subway.

== Planned extensions ==
Like other large and aging rapid transit systems, the Chicago "L" faces problems of delays, breakdowns, and a multi-billion-dollar backlog of deferred maintenance. The CTA is currently focused on eliminating slow zones, modernizing the Red, Blue, and Purple lines, and improving "L" stations. In addition, CTA has studied numerous other proposals for expanded rail service and renovations, some of which may be implemented in the future. As of April 2026, only one extension is currently being considered by the CTA.

=== Red Line Extension ===
An extension of the Red Line was first proposed by then Mayor Richard J. Daley in 1969. It would provide service from the current terminus at 95th/Dan Ryan to 130th Street, decreasing transit times for Far South Side residents and relieving crowding and congestion at the current terminus, The CTA presented its locally preferred alternative at meetings in August 2009. This consists of a new elevated rail line between 95th/Dan Ryan and a new terminal station at 130th Street, paralleling the Union Pacific Railroad and the South Shore Line, through the Far South Side neighborhoods of Roseland, Washington Heights, West Pullman, and Riverdale.

In addition to the terminal station at 130th, three new stations would be built at 103rd, 111th, and Michigan. Basic engineering, along with an environmental impact statement, were underway in 2010. Alignment commenting was opened in 2016. The CTA announced the route, 5.3 miles (8.5 km) in length, and four new stations on January 26, 2018. Construction of the extension would begin in late 2025 and be scheduled to be completed in 2030. Contracts for preliminary work were approved in December 2018.

In August 2022, the Red Line Extension reached the Federal Funding Phase. In December 2022, the City Council approved the creation of a district that will send nearly $1 billion in tax revenue over the next few decades to extend the Red Line south of 95th Street, a major step toward completing the project after a half-century of false starts. In March 2023, President Biden’s proposed 2024 budget includes $350 million in federal funding for the Red Line Extension project. In September 2023, the Federal Transit Administration announced $1.973 billion for the extension. In October 2023, the CTA received another $100 million for the extension. In August 2024, the CTA awarded a $2.3 billion construction contract to Walsh-VINCI Transit Community Partners for the 4-stop extension, with a total project cost (including financing) of $5.3 billion. Advance construction work began in fall 2024. In January 2025, the CTA signed a full funding grant agreement for the extension. A groundbreaking ceremony for the extension occurred on April 24, 2026. As of April 2026, it is scheduled to be completed in 2030.

=== Previously studied projects ===
These projects are currently not being pursued by the CTA because of the cost and the concerns of residents.

==== Circle Line ====
The proposed Circle Line would form an "outer loop", traversing downtown via the State Street subway, then going southwest on the Orange Line and north along Ashland, before re-joining the subway at North/Clybourn or Clark/Division. The Circle Line would connect several different Metra lines with the "L" system, and would facilitate transfers between existing CTA lines; these connections would be situated near the existing Metra and "L" lines' maximum load points. CTA initiated official "Alternatives Analysis" planning for the Circle Line in 2005. The Circle Line concept garnered significant public interest and media coverage.

Early conceptual planning divided the Circle Line into three segments. Phase 1 would be a restoration of the dilapidated "Paulina Connector", a short 0.75 miles (1.21 km) track segment that links Ashland/Lake with Polk. This track section has since been restored and service on the 54th/Cermak branch was transferred to the Pink Line. Phase 2 would link 18th on the Pink Line to Ashland on the Orange Line, with a new elevated structure running through a large industrial area. Phase 3, the final phase, would link Ashland/Lake to North/Clybourn with a new subway running through the dense neighborhoods of West Town and Wicker Park. With the completion of all three phases, the perimeter area would be served by Circle Line trains.

In 2009, CTA released the results of its Alternatives Analysis Screen 3, in which it decided to begin early engineering work on Phase 2, due to its simple alignment through unpopulated areas and its relatively low cost (estimated to be $1.1 billion). Preliminary engineering work was performed on Phase 2. In addition to the new line, CTA planned to build four new stations as part of Phase 2. Three out of the four would be located along existing lines that the Circle Line will utilize. These would be at 18th/Clark, Cermak/Blue Island, Roosevelt/Paulina, and Congress/Paulina.

18th/Clark would be along the Orange Line in the Chinatown neighborhood, and would include a direct transfer connection to the Cermak/Chinatown station on the Red Line. Cermak/Blue Island would be located on the newly built elevated tracks in the Pilsen neighborhood. Roosevelt/Paulina would be located on the Pink Line in the Illinois Medical District. Congress/Paulina would be built above the Eisenhower Expressway, with a direct transfer connection to the Illinois Medical District station on the Blue Line. Existing stations would provide service near the United Center.

Phase 3 was not implemented, and planning stopped after 2009. Phase 3 ran through dense residential areas, so alignment must be considered carefully to avoid adversely impacting those neighborhoods. CTA estimated that Phase 3 would be far more costly than Phase 2 due to its being underground. After a number of alternate plans were evaluated, in 2009, CTA adopted the "locally preferred alternative" (LPA), which stopped Circle Line work after Phase 2, and Phase 3 was relegated to a "long term vision".

==== Orange Line Extension ====
A proposed extension of the Orange Line would have provided transit service from the current terminus, Midway International Airport, to the Ford City Mall, which was originally meant to be the Orange Line's southern terminus when the line was planned in the 1980s. This would have alleviated congestion at the current Midway terminal. The CTA presented its locally preferred alternative at meetings in August 2009. This consisted of a new elevated rail line that would have run south from the Midway terminal along Belt Railway tracks, crossing the Clearing Yard while heading southwest to Cicero Avenue, then would have run south in the median of Cicero to a terminal on the east side of Cicero near 76th Street. Basic engineering, along with an environmental impact statement, were underway in 2010. This extension was canceled.

==== Yellow Line Extension ====
A proposed extension of the Yellow Line would have provided transit service from the current terminus, at Dempster Street, to the corner of Old Orchard Road and the Edens Expressway, just west of the Westfield Old Orchard shopping center. The CTA presented its locally preferred alternative at meetings in August 2009. This consisted of a new elevated rail line from Dempster north along a former rail right-of-way to the Edens Expressway, where the line would have turned to the north and run along the east side of the expressway to a terminus at Old Orchard Road.

Basic engineering, along with an environmental impact statement, were underway in 2010. Unlike extensions to the Red and Orange Lines, the Yellow Line extension had attracted significant community opposition from residents of Skokie, as well as parents of students at the Niles North High School, on whose land the new line would have been constructed. Residents and parents cited concerns about noise, visual pollution, and crime. As a result, the extension was canceled.

=== Canceled projects ===
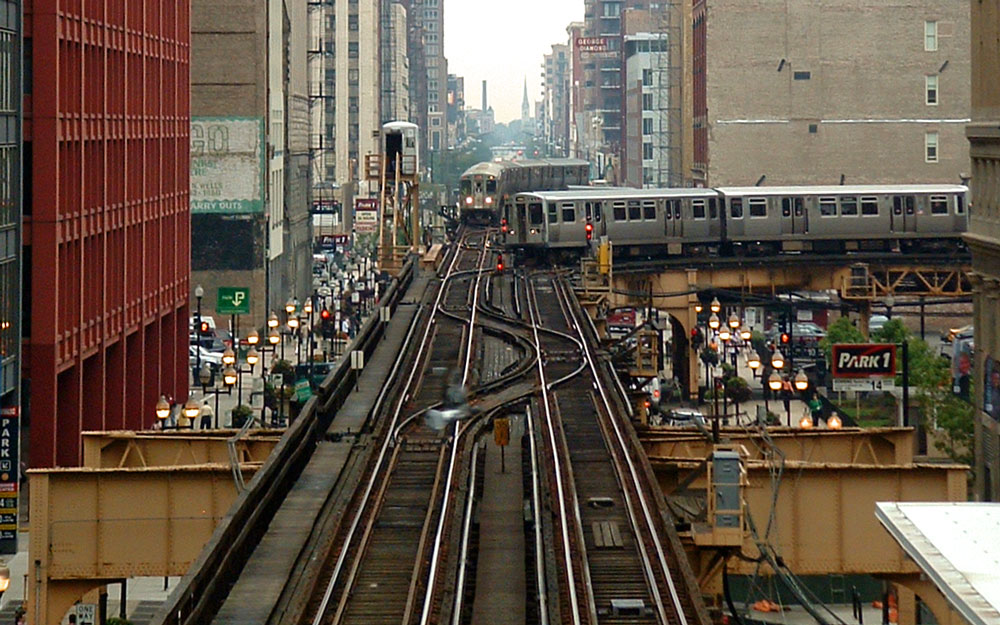
A Brown Line train passes through Tower 12 while an Orange Line train waits its turn to enter the Loop (2005).

Numerous plans have been advanced over the years to reorganize downtown Chicago rapid transit service, originally with the intention of replacing the elevated Loop lines with subways. That idea has been largely abandoned as the city seems keen on keeping an elevated/subway mix.

There have been continued calls to improve transit within the city's greatly enlarged central core. At present the "L" does not provide direct service between the Metra commuter rail terminals in the West Loop and Michigan Avenue, the principal shopping district, nor does it offer convenient access to popular downtown destinations such as Navy Pier, Soldier Field, and McCormick Place. Plans for the Central Area Circulator, a $700 million downtown light rail system meant to remedy this, were shelved in 1995 for lack of funding. An underground line running along the lake shore would connect some of the city's major tourist destinations, but this plan has not been widely discussed. Recognizing the cost and difficulty of implementing an all-rail solution, the Chicago Central Area Plan was introduced. It proposes a mix of rail and bus improvements, the centerpiece of which was the West Loop Transportation Center. The top level would be a pedestrian mezzanine, buses would operate in the second level, rapid transit trains in the third level, and commuter/high-speed intercity trains in the bottom level.

The rapid transit level would connect to the existing Blue Line subway at its north and south ends, making possible the "Blue Line loop", envisioned as an underground counterpart to the Loop elevated. Alternatively, this level might be occupied by the Clinton Street subway. Among other advantages, the West Loop Transportation Center would provide a direct link between the "L" and the city's two busiest commuter rail terminals, Ogilvie Transportation Center and Union Station.

The plan proposed transitways along Carroll Avenue, a former rail right-of-way north of the main branch of the Chicago River, and under Monroe Street in the Loop, which earlier transit schemes had proposed as rail routes. The Carroll Avenue route would provide faster bus service between the commuter stations and the rapidly redeveloping Near North Side, with possible rail service later. These new busways would tie into the bus level of the West Loop Transportation Center.

These are canceled projects, identified in various city and regional planning studies. The CTA has not begun official studies of these expansions, so it is unclear whether they will ever be implemented, or simply remain as visionary projects.

==== Clinton Street Subway ====
It would run through the West Loop, connecting the Red Line near North/Clybourn to the Red Line again, near Cermak-Chinatown. From North/Clybourn, the subway would run south along Larrabee Street, then under the Chicago River to Clinton Street in the West Loop. Running south under Clinton, the subway would pass Ogilvie Transportation Center and Union Station, with short connections to Metra trains. It would then continue south on Clinton until 16th Street, where it would turn east, cross the river again, and rejoin the Red Line just north of the current Cermak-Chinatown stop. The estimated cost of this line was $3 billion, with no local funding source identified.

==== Airport Express ====
Airport Express service to O'Hare International Airport and Midway International Airport to and from a downtown terminal on State Street. On the 3200 series cars, black Midway and O'Hare destination signs exist, suggesting a possible Airport Express service, since the sign used for Express trains is written in a black background. A business plan prepared for the CTA called for a private firm to manage the venture with service starting in 2008. The project has been criticized as a boondoggle.

The custom-equipped, premium-fare trains would offer nonstop service at faster speeds than the current Blue and Orange Lines. Although the trains would not run on dedicated rails (construction of such tracks could cost more than $1.5 billion), several short sections of passing track built at stations would allow the express trains to pass Blue and Orange trains while they sit at those stations. The CTA has pledged $130 million and the city of Chicago $42 million toward the cost of the downtown station.

In comments posted to her blog in 2006, CTA chair Carole Brown said, "I would support premium rail service only if it brought significant new operating dollars, capital funding, or other efficiencies to CTA... The most compelling reason to proceed with the project is the opportunity to connect the Blue and Red subway tunnels," which are one block apart downtown. In the meantime, The CTA announced that due to cost overruns, it would only complete the shell of the Block 37 station; its president said "it would not make sense to completely build out the station or create the final tunnel connections until a partner is selected because final layout, technology and finishes are dependent on an operating plan."

==== Mid-City Transitway ====
It would run around, rather than through the Chicago Loop. The line would follow the Cicero Avenue/Belt Line corridor (former Crosstown Expressway alignment) between the O'Hare branch of the Blue Line at Montrose and the Dan Ryan branch of the Red Line at 87th Street. It may be an "L" line, but busway and other options are being considered.

== Security and safety ==
Violent crime on the CTA has increased since the COVID-19 pandemic, and as of March 2, 2022, was up 17% compared to the year before. The CTA Union has called for conductors, which were dropped in 1997, to be brought back, while the city has promised more security guards.

The CTA has had incidents where operators apparently overrode automatic train stops on red signals. These include the 1977 collision at Wabash and Lake, when four cars of a Lake-Dan Ryan train fell from the elevated structure, killing 11. There were two minor incidents in 2001, and two more in 2008, the more serious involving a Green Line train that derailed and straddled the split in the elevated structure at the 59th Street junction between the Ashland and East 63rd Street branches, and a minor one near 95th Street on the Red line. In 2014, the O'Hare station train crash occurred when a Blue Line train overran a bumper at the airport station and ascended up an escalator.

In 2002, 25-year-old Joseph Konopka, self-styled as "Dr. Chaos", was arrested by Chicago police for hoarding potassium cyanide and sodium cyanide in a Chicago Transit Authority storeroom in the Chicago "L" Blue Line subway. Konopka had picked the original locks on several doors in the tunnels, then changed the locks so that he could access the rarely used storage rooms freely.

Some studies have highlighted the Belmont and 95th stops on the Red Line being the "most dangerous".

As of 2018, the Chicago Police Department (CPD)'s Public Transportation Unit, and the police departments of Evanston, Skokie, Forest Park, and Oak Park patrol the CTA system. The CPD provides random screenings for explosives. In addition, the CTA has its own K-9 patrol units and has installed more than 23,000 surveillance cameras.

From 2008 to 2019, there have been a total of 27 derailments. Most were minor, but some resulted in serious injuries for passengers.

On September 24, 2019, a Brown Line train collided with a Purple Line train near Sedgwick on the North Side Main Line during the morning rush hour. Fourteen injuries were reported and the cause is under investigation. According to the Chicago Fire Department, the injured were later found to be in stable condition. No derailments occurred. The CTA said service resumed about an hour after the incident.

On October 3, 2019, a train operating Pink Line service on the Cermak branch struck a car that had driven past and around the gates at the level crossing on 47th Avenue near Cermak Road. Six injuries were reported.

On June 7, 2021, a Red Line train derailed near Bryn Mawr. 24 passengers were aboard. No injuries were reported.

On November 16, 2023, a Yellow Line train collided with a CTA snowplow at Howard Yard, resulting in 16 injuries.

On September 2, 2024, four people were killed in a mass shooting aboard a Blue Line train as it traveled between the Oak Park and Harlem stations.

On November 17, 2025, a 26-year-old woman was set on fire in an arson attack on a Blue Line train in the Loop near Clark/Lake. Two injuries including the victim and suspect were reported. The suspect, was arrested the following day and later charged federally with a terrorist attack on a mass transportation system.

== In popular culture ==
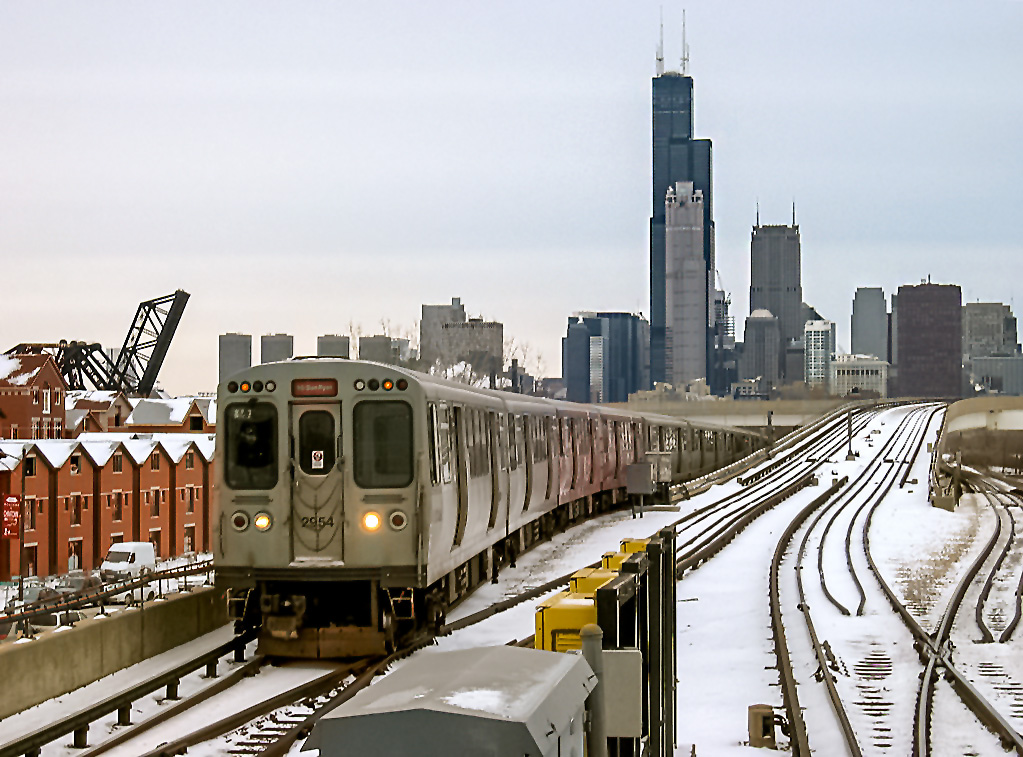
A Red Line "L" train approaches Cermak–Chinatown station through the Cermak Junction in 2004. The Sears Tower is prominent in the background.

Movies and television shows use establishing shots to orient audiences to the location. For media set in Chicago, the "L" is a common feature because it is a distinctive part of the city.

=== Films ===
- The Blues Brothers (1980)
- High Fidelity (2000) follows Rob, the protagonist, on his commute from to his record store in Wicker Park.
- Running Scared (1986) shows a car chase taking place on the "L" tracks. The sounds of the "L" are also distinctive and are therefore also used to establish location
- The Fugitive (1993), which also contained a short scene inside of an "L" train
- While You Were Sleeping (1995) includes a main character, Lucy, who works as an "L" fare collector
- Spider-Man 2 (2004), despite taking place in New York City, the fight between Spider-Man and Doctor Octopus was filmed at the Loop on an "L" train, since Manhattan lacks extensive elevated tracks.

=== Television series ===
- Dick Wolf's Chicago franchise of four TV shows is set in and filmed on site in the city, and features the "L" in various episodes.
- In the American version of the series Shameless, set on the South Side of Chicago, several main characters take the "L" for transportation. Many scenes take place underneath or adjacent to the elevated tracks, and the trains frequently appear in the background and in establishing shots.
- On the Showtime sitcom, The Chi, the "L" is featured in the episodes.

== See also ==
- List of metro systems
- List of United States rapid transit systems
- Transportation in Chicago
