= Dorval Carter =

American business executive

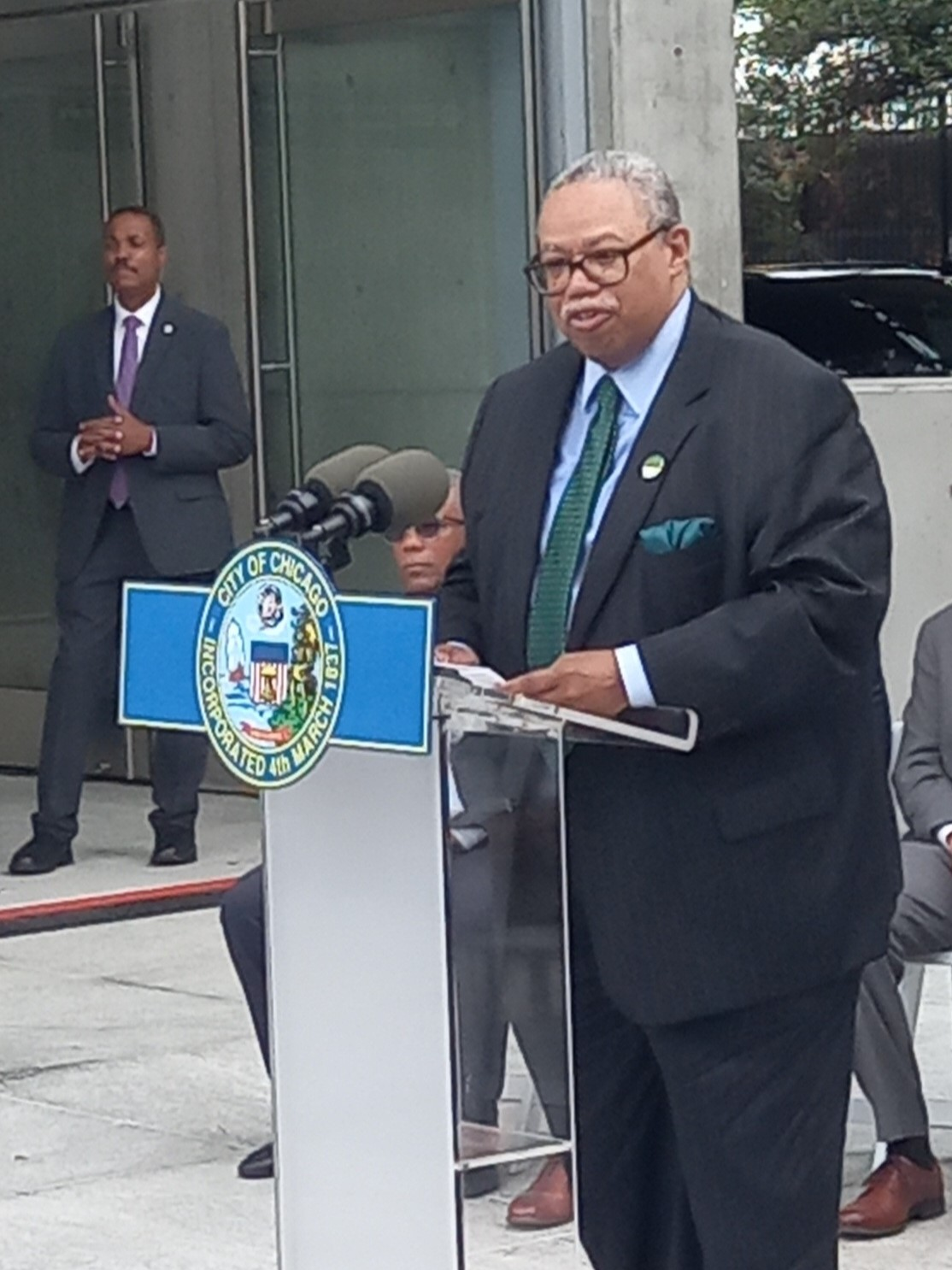
- Carter at the Damen (Green Line) station (2024)

President of the Chicago Transit Authority
- In office May 13, 2015 – January 31, 2025
- Preceded by: Forrest Claypool
- Succeeded by: Nora Leerhsen (acting)

Personal details
- Born: Dorval Ronald Carter Jr. 1958 or 1959 (age 67–68)
- Education: Carroll University (BS); Howard University (JD)

Dorval Ronald Carter Jr. (born 1958/1959) is an American businessman and executive who served as the President of the Chicago Transit Authority (CTA) from 2015 until resigning in January 2025; he also served as acting president of the CTA from January to April 2009. He has previously worked in transportation-related organizations including the Federal Transit Administration and the United States Department of Transportation.

== Education and career ==
Carter received a B.S. in Business Administration and Economics from Carroll University in 1979, and his J.D. from Howard University School of Law. After his education, he began working in local and Federal levels.

Carter became the President of the Chicago Transit Authority (CTA) in May 2015. He was appointed by the Mayor of Chicago, Rahm Emanuel and succeeds Forrest Claypool. The board members consequently elected him as Head of the Board. While serving as the president, he was also in charge of the Red and Purple Modernization Phase One Project (RPM), and the Red Line Extension Project (RLE).

Carter announced his retirement from the CTA on January 13, 2025, shortly after finalizing a Full Funding Grant Agreement for the RLE with the Department of Transportation.

== Criticism ==
A nationwide decline in public transportation during the COVID-19 pandemic also afflicted the CTA and severely reduced revenues, ridership, and transit frequencies. Though other transportation systems across the US have seen recoveries to pre-pandemic service levels, Carter has faced criticism over a slow recovery for the CTA. Dorval has faced calls for his resignation from Chicago Aldermen and activists as far back as November 2022; however, after an article was released about the death of Antia Lyons, a CTA bus operator who experienced a heart attack while in her bus and was unconscious for an hour before an employee called 911, and the subsequent failure of the CTA to report her death to the IL Occupational Safety and Health Administration, there have been calls for a change in leadership from a greater number of elected officials including IL Governor J.B. Pritzker.
