= Nora Leerhsen =

American lawyer and executive

President of the Chicago Transit Authority
- Acting
- Assumed office February 1, 2025
- Preceded by: Dorval Carter

Personal details
- Born: 1982 or 1983 (age 43–44)
- Education: George Washington University (BA); Chestnut Hill College (MEd); University of Chicago (MA); University of Wisconsin, Madison (JD)

Nora Leerhsen (born 1982/1983) is an American lawyer and executive who has served as the Acting President of the Chicago Transit Authority (CTA) since February 2025, replacing Dorval Carter. Leerhsen is the first woman to lead the CTA since its establishment in 1947.

== Education and career ==
Leerhsen has earned a B.A. in history from George Washington University, a Master of Education from Chestnut Hill College, a M.A. in social science from the University of Chicago, and a J.D. from University of Wisconsin, Madison.

Leerhsen joined the CTA in 2014 and served as a project coordinator, senior advisor to the chief of staff and chief operating officer, and deputy chief of staff before becoming chief of staff in 2018.

On January 31, 2025, CTA President Dorval Carter resigned after nearly ten years in the office. Leerhsen became acting CTA President the following day.
