= Chicago Transit Authority bus services =

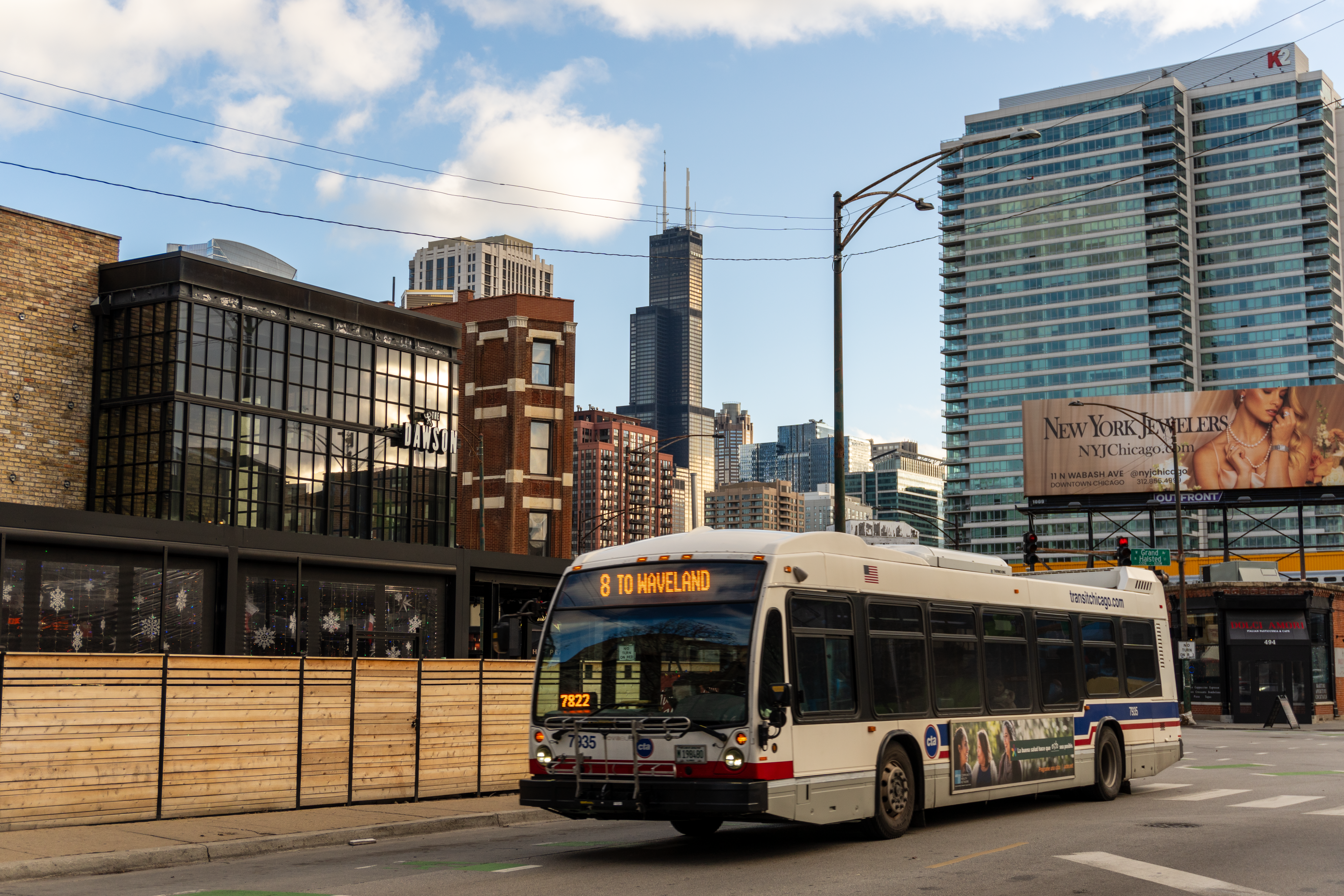
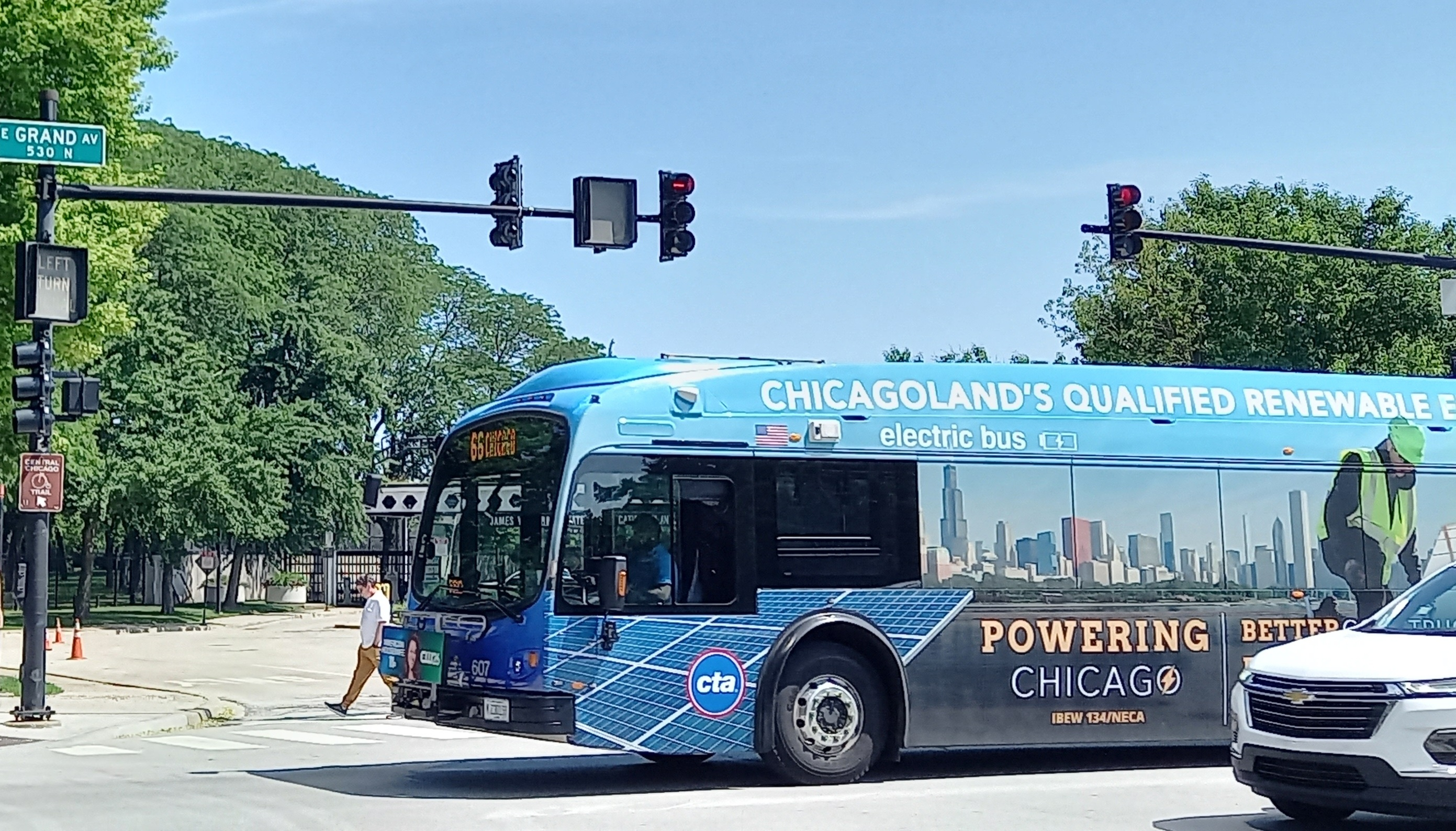
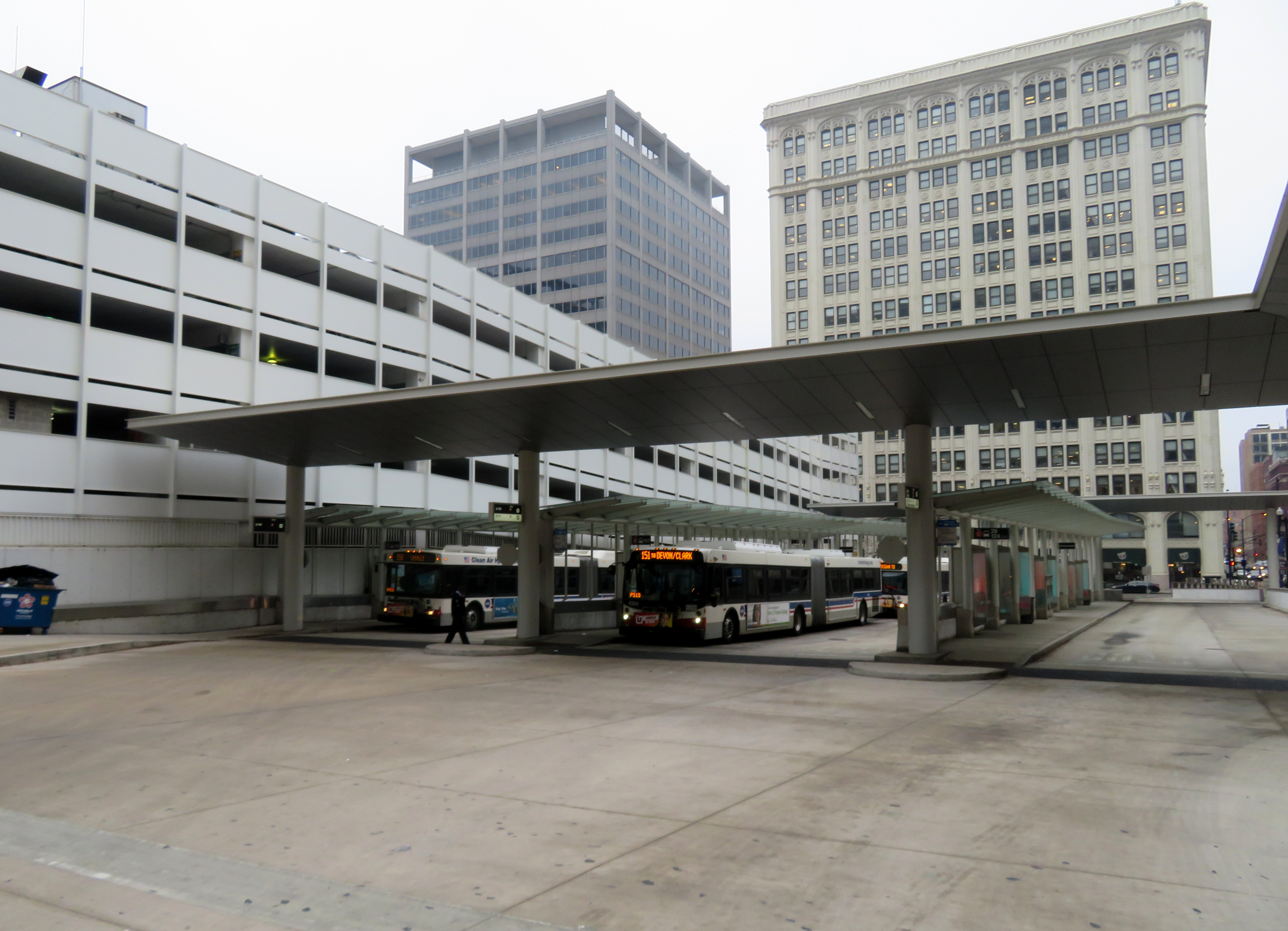
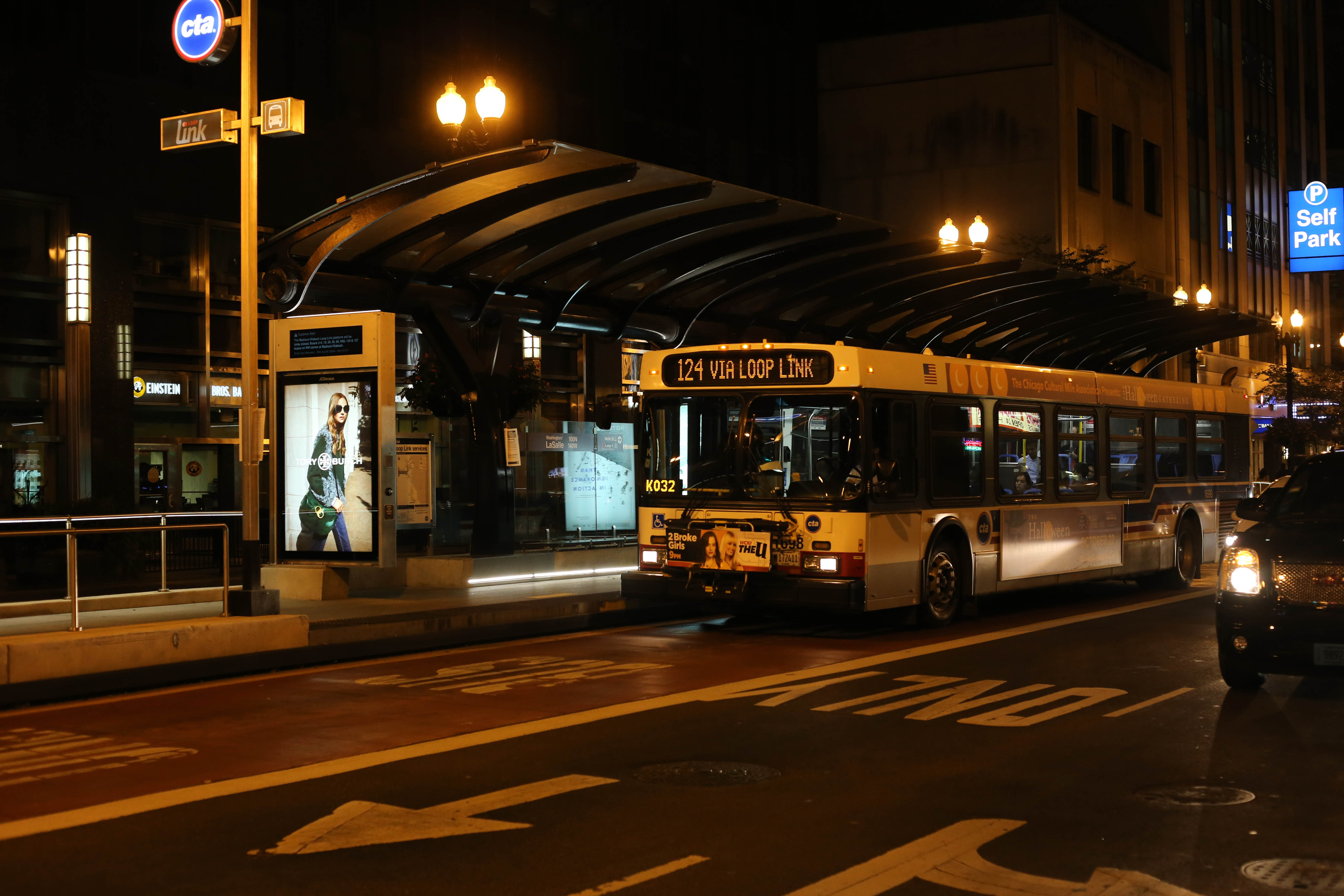
Gallery of CTA bus services: two local services (one diesel, one electric), the Union Station Transit Center, and Loop Link bus lanes

Chicago Transit Authority bus services are provided throughout Chicago, Illinois, and the surrounding suburbs, operated by the Chicago Transit Authority (CTA), one of the three service boards of the Northern Illinois Transit Authority (NITA). As of January 2025, the CTA has 1,966 buses that operate 127 routes. In 2025, the CTA bus system had a ridership of 183,958,100, or about 654,600 per weekday as of the second quarter of 2026.

== History ==
=== Streetcar services ===
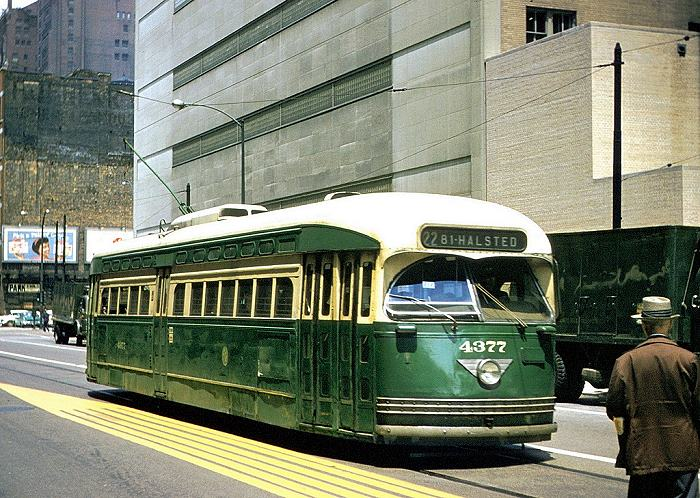
Streetcar at Clark and Harrison streets, 1950

The first street railway service began in 1859 along State Street. At the time, the service was operated using horsecars. Within the next few decades, additional horsecar services, which were operated by multiple companies, entered operation. Throughout the 1880s, these lines were converted to cable cars. Between the 1890s and the 1900s, cable cars were replaced with electric streetcars.

In 1914, the streetcar companies operating in Chicago were consolidated into the Chicago Surface Lines. In 1947, the consolidated company was acquired by the newly created Chicago Transit Authority.

Within the next decade after the acquisition, the CTA oversaw the removal of streetcar lines in favor of motor buses. On June 21, 1958, the last streetcar service, the Clark-Wentworth route, was removed.

=== Trolleybus services ===
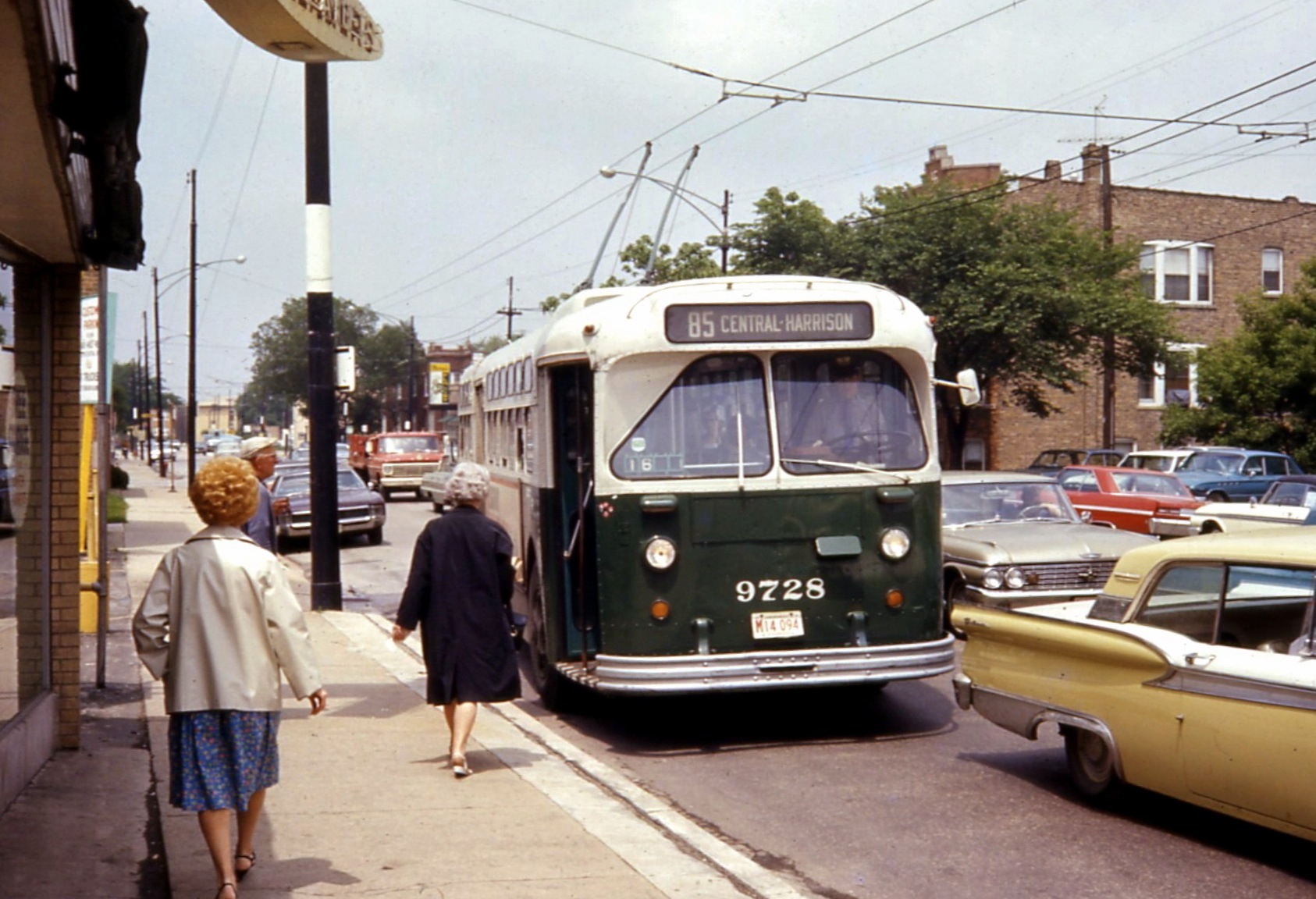
A trolley bus serving route 85-Central in 1968

In 1953, the CTA placed an order for Flxible buses after the latter's absorption of the Fageol Twin Coach Company.

Until 1973, CTA's fleet included a large number of electric trolley buses – or "trolley coaches", as they were commonly known at the time. In the 1950s, the fleet of around 700 trolley coaches was the largest such fleet in the U.S., and represented about one-quarter of CTA's total number of surface-transit vehicles (motor bus, trolley bus and, until 1958, streetcar).

Possibly influenced by the 1967 Chicago blizzard, during which CTA trolley buses were unable to maneuver around abandoned automobiles without dewiring, CTA decided to discontinue trolley bus service. Trolley bus service was phased out in the late 1960s and early 1970s, and trolley buses ran for the last time on March 25, 1973.

=== Motor bus services before the CTA ===
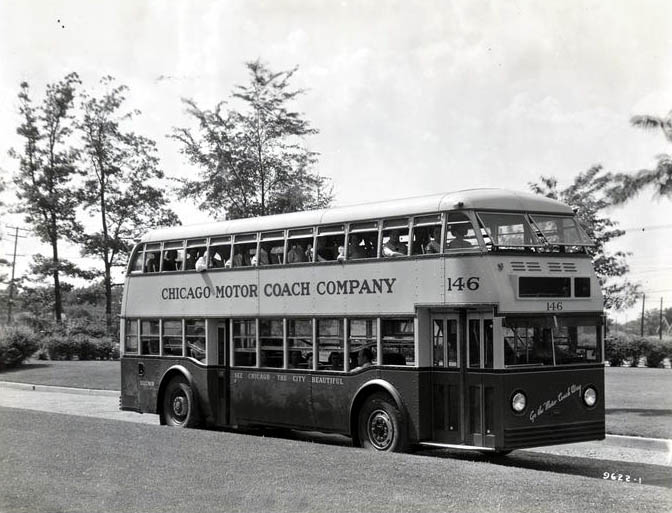
Double-decker bus of the Chicago Motor Coach Company

The Chicago Motor Bus Company was formed in December 1913. On June 19, 1916, the Lincoln Park Board granted the bus company a franchise to run bus services in the North Side. On March 25, 1917, the company began operation on the first motor bus service in Chicago. The first bus route, which used 11 double-decker buses, ran primarily along Sheridan Road and Lake Shore Drive from Devon Avenue and Sheridan Road to Adams Street and State Street. This route was named Route 51 Sheridan Road.

Two other bus companies were established in Chicago: the Chicago Stage Company and the Depot Motor Bus Lines. In the early 1920s, the three bus companies merged into the Chicago Motor Coach Company. In 1924, the newly consolidated company became a subsidiary of The Omnibus Corporation.

In late 1922, the South Side Board and the Illinois Commerce Commission permitted the bus company to run 42 miles (68 km) of bus services to parks in the South Side. Buses would run along Michigan Avenue to access the Chicago Loop. On April 15, 1923, the first bus service in the South Side entered operation as Route 1 Drexel and Hyde Park Boulevards. The rest of the network in the South Side became operational by October 1923. The first bus services in the West Side began a year later on March 16, 1924, as the following routes: Route 26 Jackson Boulevard and Route 31 Washington Boulevard. Both routes ran from the Chicago Loop to Austin Boulevard.

Although the newly formed Chicago Transit Authority (CTA) purchased both the Chicago Surface Lines and the Chicago Rapid Transit Company on September 30, 1947, the CTA purchased the Chicago Motor Coach Company on September 30, 1952, for $16.6 million. The CTA promptly prepended the number 1 to several existing route numbers to avoid numbering conflicts with other routes. For example, Route 51 was renumbered to 151.

=== Bus services under the CTA ===
CTA buses were known as the "green limousine" or the "big green" — buses were one or more shades of green from the CTA's establishment until the end of the 1980s. With the delivery of the TMC RTS buses in 1991, a more patriotic color scheme was adopted, and the green scheme was fully phased out by 1996. A notable color scheme was the "Bicentennial" of about 1974 to 1976.

CTA bought very few buses between the mid-1970s and the end of the 1980s. During this time, purchases were only made in 1979 (20 MAN/AM General SG 220 articulated buses), 1982-83 (200 Flyer D901 buses and 125 additional MAN articulateds), and 1985 (362 MAN Americana standard-length buses). Another aspect of this period was that with the exception of the 1979 and 1983 MAN orders, none of those buses had air-conditioning, a budget saving move by the CTA. The 1972-76 fleet of GM "New Look" buses, 1870 total, which were originally air-conditioned (although there were problems with the air-conditioning systems, eventually being disabled and sliding windows installed in the buses), composed the majority of vehicles in service into the early 1990s.

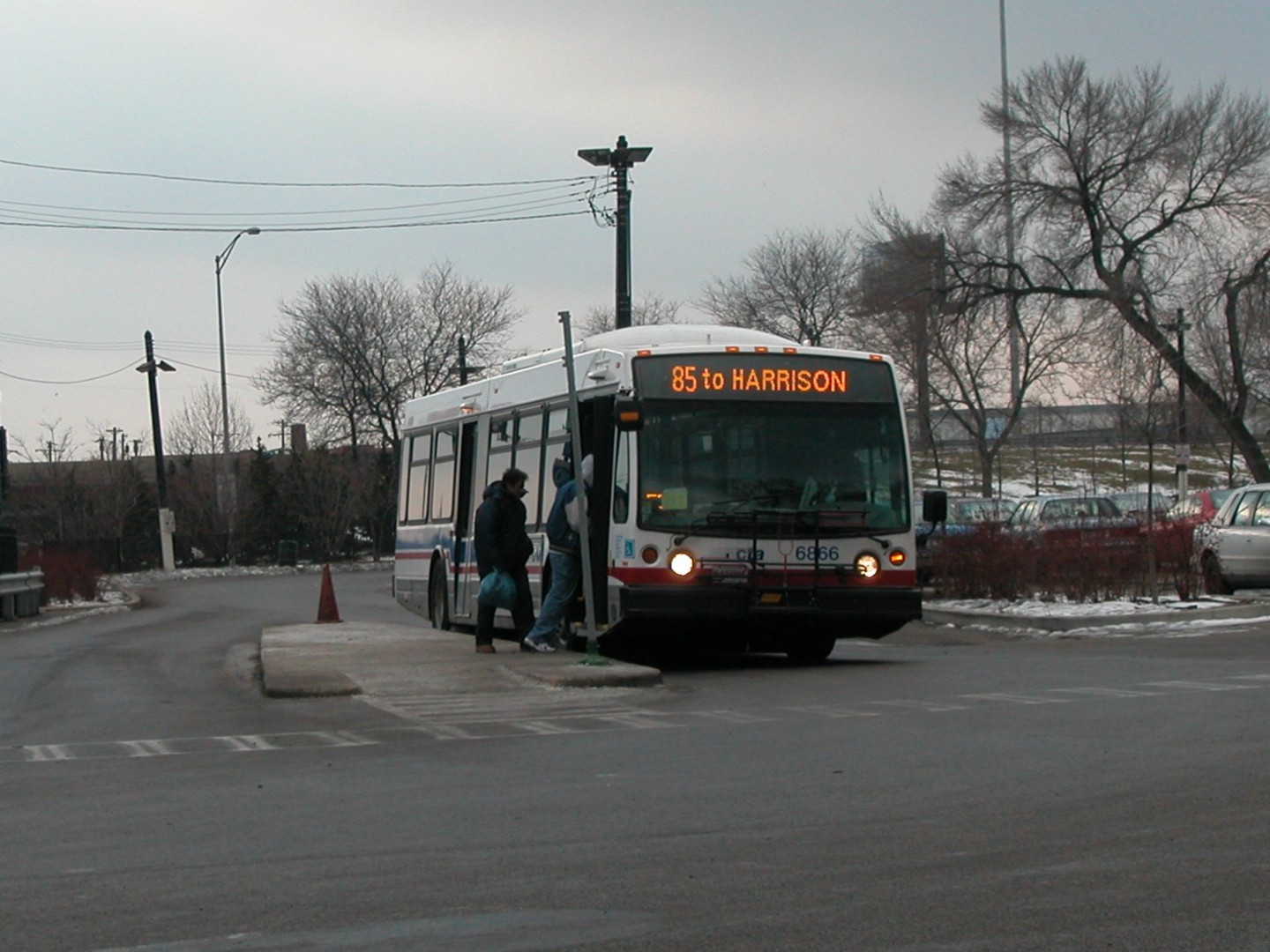
CTA Nova LFS on Central Ave in 2004

In 1995, the CTA placed an experimental order of their first 65 low floor transit buses from New Flyer Industries, the D40LF. Also, that same year, the CTA received its last order of high floor buses from Flxible Corporation, shortly before the manufacturer folded. In 1998, the CTA placed an order for 484 new low floor transit buses from Canadian bus-building firm Nova Bus. This executed move billed the CTA as Nova's American launch customer for the latter's signature product, the LFS series. This was also done to meet the "Buy American" requirements for buses in the United States transit bus market, since General Motors ceased bus production and Flxible went out of business. Lastly, these buses replaced the ones that were built in 1983 and 1985 due to their age as well as their lack of air conditioning and ADA compliance.

In the 2010s, bus projects that sought to implement some features of bus rapid transit were conducted. The Jeffery Jump opened in November 2012, and the Loop Link opened in December 2015.

== Fleet ==
As of 2026, CTA's fleet is mostly dominated by the New Flyer D40LF which replaced buses that were built in 1991 and 1995. In 2014, CTA ordered 400 new buses from Nova. The number increased to 425 after it exercised an option. The CTA exercised another option for an additional twenty-five buses, from Nova Bus. Nova Bus delivered an additional 600 new buses which replaced the remainder of the older Nova buses that were delivered between 2000 and 2002, in addition to starting the retirement of New Flyer D40LF buses delivered between 2006 and 2009.

In 2014, the CTA received their first electric buses from New Flyer, making the CTA the first major U.S. transit agency to use the new wave of electric buses as part of a regular service.

=== Active fleet ===
Year	Manufacturer & Model	Length	Photo	Engine Type	Numbers	Assigned Garages	Notes
2006–2009	New Flyer; D40LF	40 ft (12 m)		Diesel	1000–2029 (1,030 buses)	74th, 77th, 103rd, Chicago, Forest Glen, Kedzie, North Park	Many units are currently being retired.
2008–2009	New Flyer; DE60LF	60 ft (18 m)		Diesel-Electric; Hybrid	4000–4207 (208 buses)	103rd, Kedzie, North Park	
2012–2013	New Flyer; DE60LFR	60 ft (18 m)		Diesel-Electric; Hybrid	4300–4332 (33 buses)	103rd, North Park	
2012–2013	New Flyer; D60LFR	60 ft (18 m)		Diesel	4333–4399 (67 buses)	North Park	
2014	New Flyer; XE40	40 ft (12 m)		Electric	700–701 (2 buses)	77th	700 & 701 out of service since 2021
2014–2019	NovaBus; LFS	40 ft (12 m)		Diesel	7900–8349 (450 buses)	74th, 77th, 103rd, Chicago, Forest Glen, Kedzie	
2019–2022	Proterra; Catalyst BE40/ZX5	40 ft (12 m)		Electric	600–624 (25 buses)	74th, Chicago	
2022–2025	NovaBus; LFS	40 ft (12 m)		Diesel	8350–8949 (600 buses)	74th, 77th, 103rd, Chicago, Forest Glen, Kedzie, North Park	Replaced all of the 6400s; Will replace the 1000s

Notes:

- Source: Chicago Transit Authority Presentation on Alternative Fuels, April 20th, 2009, p. 4 (accessed 1 July 2009), unless otherwise indicated.
- Some individual numbers may no longer be in service.
- See Chicago Transit and Railfan for historic rosters.

=== Bus garages ===
- Forest Glen Garage, 5419 W. Armstrong Avenue, (Elston/Bryn Mawr)
- North Park Garage, 3112 W. Foster Avenue, (Foster/Albany)
- Chicago Garage, 642 N. Pulaski Road, (Chicago/Pulaski)
- Kedzie Garage, 358 S. Kedzie Avenue, (Van Buren/Kedzie)
- 74th Garage, 1815 W. 74th Street, (74th/Wood)
- 77th Garage, 210 W. 79th Street, (79th/Wentworth)
- 103rd Garage, 1702 E. 103rd Street, (103rd/Stony Island)

== Current routes ==
Local Local (part-time) Express Express (part-time) Jump Limited-stop (part-time) Owl
Route Name	Northern/Western Terminus	Southern/Eastern Terminus	Operates	Annual ridership (2025)	Garage
1 Bronzeville/Union Station	Near West Side; Desplaines/Harrison	Douglas; 34th/Michigan (SB); 35th/Indiana (NB)	Weekday rush	280,347	77th
2 Hyde Park Express	Streeterville; Navy Pier	Hyde Park; 60th/Cottage Grove	Weekday rush	485,813	77th
3 King Drive	Streeterville; Erie/Fairbanks	Roseland; 95th/Dan Ryan ( ■)	Daily	4,926,709	77th
4 N4; Cottage Grove	New Eastside; Columbus/S. Water	Pullman; 115th/Cottage Grove	Daily	4,702,942	77th
4 N4; Cottage Grove	The Loop; State/Washington	Roseland; 95th/Dan Ryan ( ■)	Night	4,702,942	77th
X4; Cottage Grove Express	New Eastside; Columbus/Randolph	Roseland; 95th/Dan Ryan ( ■)	Weekday rush	710,491	77th
N5; South Shore Night Bus	Grand Crossing; 69th ( ■)	Roseland; 95th/Dan Ryan ( ■)	Night	60,685	103rd
6 Jackson Park Express	New Eastside; Wacker/Columbus	South Chicago; 79th/Lakefront	Daily	2,238,870	103rd
7 Harrison	South Austin; Harrison/Central	The Loop; Michigan/Ida B. Wells	Weekdays	1,075,822	Kedzie
8 Halsted	Northalsted; Broadway/Waveland	Gresham; 79th/Halsted	Daily	5,375,467	77th
8A; South Halsted	Grand Crossing; 79th/Perry ( ■)	West Pullman; 127th/Lowe; 119th/Halsted (rush hour)	Daily	797,025	77th
9 N9; Ashland	Ravenswood; Ravenswood Metra	Beverly; 95th/Ashland	Daily	5,874,174	74th
9 N9; Ashland	Ravenswood; Ravenswood Metra	East Beverly; 104th/Vincennes (rush hour)	Daily	5,874,174	74th
9 N9; Ashland	Lincoln Park; North/Clark	Roseland; 95th/Dan Ryan ( ■)	Night	5,874,174	74th
X9; Ashland Express	Buena Park; Irving Park/Broadway	Beverly; 95th/Ashland	Weekday rush	1,440,875	74th
10; Obama Presidential Center/ Museum of Science & Industry Express	Streeterville; Michigan/Chestnut	Woodlawn; Obama Presidential Center	Daily	48,915	Kedzie
11; Lincoln	Skokie; Howard/McCormick	Lincoln Square; Western ( ■)	Daily	323,155	North Park
12; Roosevelt	South Austin; Central/Harrison	Central Station; 15th Place/Indiana	Daily	3,034,431	Kedzie/ Chicago
J14; Jeffery Jump	West Loop Gate; Washington/Jefferson	South Deering; 103rd/Stony Island	Daily	2,476,386	103rd
15; Jeffery Local	Fuller Park; 47th ( ■)	South Deering; 103rd/Stony Island	Daily	1,777,496	103rd
18; 16th/18th	Cicero; 16th/Cicero	Near South Side; Roosevelt ( ■■■)	Daily	1,023,976	Kedzie
19; United Center Express	New Eastside; Michigan/Randolph	Near West Side; United Center	Special events	23,317	Chicago/ Kedzie
20 N20; Madison	South Austin; Madison/Austin	The Loop; Washington/Michigan; Washington/State (night); Randolph/Columbus (rush hour)	24 hours	4,321,475	Chicago
21; Cermak	North Riverside; North Riverside Mall	Near South Side; Mercy Hospital	Daily	2,466,648	Kedzie
21; Cermak	Cicero; 54th/Cermak ( ■)	Near South Side; Mercy Hospital	Daily	2,466,648	Kedzie
22 N22; Clark	Rogers Park; Howard ( ■■■)	South Loop; Clark/Harrison	24 hours	4,604,400	North Park
24; Wentworth	The Loop; Clark/Lake ( ■■■■■■)	Grand Crossing; 79th ( ■)	Weekdays	486,397	77th
24; Wentworth	The Loop; Clark/Lake ( ■■■■■■)	Gresham; 87th/Racine (rush hour only)	Weekdays	486,397	77th
26; South Shore Express	Streeterville; Chicago/Fairbanks	South Deering; 103rd/Stony Island	Weekdays	726,920	103rd
28; Stony Island	Kenwood; 47th/Lake Park	South Deering; 103rd/Stony Island	Daily	1,333,013	103rd
28; Stony Island	Kenwood; 47th/Lake Park	Pullman; Olive–Harvey College (weekdays)	Daily	1,333,013	103rd
28; Stony Island	West Loop Gate; Union Station (rush hour)	Pullman; Olive–Harvey College (weekdays)	Daily	1,333,013	103rd
29; State	Streeterville; Navy Pier	Roseland; 95th/Dan Ryan ( ■)	Daily	2,849,951	103rd
30; South Chicago	Grand Crossing; 69th ( ■)	Hegewisch; Hegewisch Station	Daily	733,333	103rd
30; South Chicago	Avalon Park/South Shore; 79th/South Chicago (Sunday)	Hegewisch; Hegewisch Station	Daily	733,333	103rd
31; 31st	Pilsen; Ashland ( ■)	Lake Meadows; 33rd Place/King Drive	Weekdays	148,468	77th
34 N34; South Michigan	Roseland; 95th/Dan Ryan ( ■)	Altgeld Gardens; 131st/Ellis	24 hours	1,190,057	103rd
35; 31st/35th	Brighton Park; 36th/Kedzie	Lake Meadows; 35th/Cottage Grove; Douglas; Lakefront/31st (summer weekends)	Daily	1,116,053	Kedzie
35; 31st/35th	Cicero; Cicero/24th Pl	Lake Meadows; 35th/Cottage Grove; Douglas; Lakefront/31st (summer weekends)	Daily	1,116,053	Kedzie
36; Broadway	Rogers Park; Arthur/Clark	The Loop; LaSalle Metra	Daily	3,723,726	North Park
37; Sedgwick	Lincoln Park; Fullerton ( ■■■)	Near West Side; Clinton ( ■)	Weekdays	384,722	Chicago
39; Pershing	Brighton Park; 38th/St. Louis	Oakland; 40th/Lake Park	Daily	417,183	77th
43; 43rd	Canaryville; 41st/Emerald	Oakland; 43rd/Oakenwald	Daily	268,750	77th
43; 43rd	Fuller Park; 47th ( ■) (weekday eves)	Oakland; 43rd/Oakenwald	Daily	268,750	77th
44; Wallace/Racine	Bridgeport; Halsted ( ■)	Gresham; 87th/Racine	Daily	818,035	74th
47; 47th	Brighton Park; Kedzie ( ■)	Kenwood; 47th/Lake Park	Daily	2,946,309	74th
47; 47th	Garfield Ridge; Midway ( ■)	Kenwood; 47th/Lake Park	Daily	2,946,309	74th
48; South Damen	Brighton Park; Western ( ■)	Gresham; 87th/Damen	Weekday rush	191,241	74th
49 N49; Western	Budlong Woods; Berwyn/Western	Wrightwood; 79th/Western	24 hours	4,623,625	North Park/ 74th
X49; Western Express	Budlong Woods; Berwyn/Western	Wrightwood; 79th/Western	Weekday rush	1,193,295	North Park/ 74th
49B; North Western	West Ridge; Western/Birchwood	Lincoln Square; Western ( ■)	Daily	1,245,254	North Park
50; Damen	Andersonville; Edgewater/Clark	McKinley Park; 35th/Archer ( ■)	Daily	2,500,264	North Park
51; 51st	Brighton Park; Kedzie ( ■)	Fuller Park; 47th ( ■)	Daily	324,996	77th
52; Kedzie	Humboldt Park; Kedzie/Chicago	Marquette Park; Kedzie/63rd	Daily	2,260,614	Kedzie
52A; South Kedzie	Brighton Park; Kedzie ( ■)	Mount Greenwood; 115th/Springfield	Daily	985,914	77th
53 N53; Pulaski	North Park; Pulaski/Peterson	West Lawn; Ford City Mall	Daily	5,259,714	Chicago
53 N53; Pulaski	Irving Park; Irving Park ( ■)	Archer Heights; Pulaski ( ■)	Night	5,259,714	Chicago
53A; South Pulaski	West Elsdon; Pulaski ( ■)	Mount Greenwood; 115th/Springfield (weekdays); 111th/Pulaski (weekends)	Daily	1,377,250	77th
54; Cicero	Portage Park; Cicero/Pensacola	Cicero; Cicero/24th Place	Daily	2,805,648	Chicago
54A; North Cicero/Skokie Blvd	Skokie; Old Orchard/Skokie Courthouse	Irving Park; Irving Park ( ■)	Weekday rush	124,934	Forest Glen
54B; South Cicero	North Lawndale; Cermak/Kenton	West Lawn; Ford City Mall	Daily	672,695	Chicago
55 N55; Garfield	Garfield Ridge; Midway ( ■)	Hyde Park; Museum of Science & Industry	Daily	2,494,584	74th
55 N55; Garfield	Gage Park; 55th/St. Louis	Hyde Park; Museum of Science & Industry	Night	2,494,584	74th
55A; 55th/Austin	Clearing; 65th/Austin	Garfield Ridge; Midway ( ■)	Weekday rush	35,952	74th
55N; 55th/Narragansett	Clearing; Narragansett/63rd	Garfield Ridge; Midway ( ■)	Monday–Saturday	105,746	74th
56; Milwaukee	Jefferson Park; Jefferson Park ( ■)	The Loop; Madison/Wabash ( ■■■■■)	Daily	1,942,999	Forest Glen/ North Park
57; Laramie	Belmont Cragin; Grand/Latrobe	Austin; Cicero ( ■)	Daily	518,210	Chicago
59; 59th/61st	Garfield Ridge; Midway ( ■)	Woodlawn; 60th/Stony Island	Monday–Saturday	734,537	74th
60 N60; Blue Island/26th	Cicero; Cicero/24th Pl	New Eastside; Harbor Drive/Randolph	Daily	3,317,221	Kedzie
60 N60; Blue Island/26th	Cicero; 54th/Cermak ( ■)	The Loop; Washington/State	Night	3,317,221	Kedzie
62 N62; Archer	River North; Kinzie/State	Garfield Ridge; Archer/Harlem	Daily	2,511,723	74th/ Kedzie
62 N62; Archer	The Loop; Washington/State	Garfield Ridge; Midway ( ■)	Night	2,511,723	74th/ Kedzie
62H; Archer/Harlem	Summit; 63rd/Archer	Garfield Ridge; Midway ( ■)	Monday–Saturday	208,463	74th
63 N63; 63rd	Woodlawn; 63rd/Stony Island; 63rd Street Beach (summer)	Garfield Ridge; Midway ( ■)	24 hours	3,979,516	74th
63W; West 63rd	Summit; 63rd/Archer	Garfield Ridge; Midway ( ■)	Daily	353,838	74th
65; Grand	Montclare; Grand/Nordica	Streeterville; Navy Pier	Daily	2,081,911	Chicago
66 N66; Chicago	Austin; Chicago/Austin	Streeterville; Navy Pier	Daily	5,942,976	Chicago/ Kedzie
66 N66; Chicago	Austin; Chicago/Austin	The Loop; Washington/State ( ■)	Night	5,942,976	Chicago/ Kedzie
67; 67th/69th/71st	Chicago Lawn; 69th/Western	Woodlawn; 67th/Oglesby	Daily	2,263,949	74th
67; 67th/69th/71st	West Lawn; Ford City Mall	Woodlawn; 67th/Oglesby	Daily	2,263,949	74th
68; Northwest Highway	Park Ridge; Park Ridge Metra	Jefferson Park; Jefferson Park ( ■)	Daily	260,973	Forest Glen
70; Division	Austin; Division/Austin	Near North Side; Walton/Dearborn	Daily	2,213,355	Chicago
71; 71st/South Shore	Grand Crossing; 69th ( ■)	South Shore; 73rd/Exchange	Daily	2,293,483	103rd
71; 71st/South Shore	Grand Crossing; 69th ( ■)	South Deering; 112th/Torrence	Daily	2,293,483	103rd
72; North	Galewood; North/Harlem; North/Narragansett	Lincoln Park; North/Clark; North Avenue Beach (summer)	Daily	3,783,118	Chicago
73; Armitage	Belmont Cragin; Grand/Latrobe	Old Town; Clark/North	Daily	1,352,850	Chicago
74; Fullerton	Montclare; Grand/Nordica	Lincoln Park; Fullerton/Halsted	Daily	3,067,753	Chicago
75; 74th/75th	Wrightwood; 79th/Western	South Shore; 75th/Lakefront	Daily	1,835,134	74th
76; Diversey	Montclare; Diversey/Neva	Lincoln Park; Nature Museum	Daily	2,770,571	Forest Glen
77 N77; Belmont	Dunning; Belmont/Harlem	Lakeview; Belmont/Halsted	24 hours	4,583,484	Forest Glen
77 N77; Belmont	River Grove; Belmont/Cumberland	Lakeview; Belmont/Halsted	Daily	4,583,484	Forest Glen
77 N77; Belmont	River Grove; Belmont/Cumberland	Lakeview; Lake Shore/Diversey	Daily	4,583,484	Forest Glen
78; Montrose	Norridge; Harlem/Forest Preserve	Uptown; Montrose/Marine; Montrose Beach (summer weekends)	Daily	1,908,753	Forest Glen
79 N79; 79th	West Lawn; Ford City Mall	South Chicago; 79th/Lakefront	24 hours	5,821,893	77th
79 N79; 79th	Wrightwood; 79th/Western	South Chicago; 79th/Lakefront	24 hours	5,821,893	77th
80; Irving Park	Schiller Park; Irving Park/Cumberland	Uptown; Irving Park/Broadway	Daily	2,592,492	Forest Glen
80; Irving Park	Norridge/Dunning; Irving Park/Harlem	Uptown; Irving Park/Broadway	Daily	2,592,492	Forest Glen
81 N81; Lawrence	Jefferson Park; Jefferson Park ( ■)	Uptown; Wilson/Marine	24 hours	2,946,835	Forest Glen
81W; West Lawrence	Jefferson Park; Jefferson Park ( ■)	O'Hare; Cumberland ( ■)	Daily	430,344	Forest Glen
82; Kimball/Homan	Lincolnwood; Devon/Kedzie; Lincolnwood Town Center	Little Village; 31st/Komensky	Daily	4,161,330	Kedzie/ North Park
84; Peterson	Forest Glen; Central/Caldwell	Edgewater; Bryn Mawr/Sheridan	Daily	797,180	Forest Glen
85; Central	Jefferson Park; Bryn Mawr/Elston	South Austin; Central/Harrison	Daily	2,597,115	Forest Glen
85A; North Central	Forest Glen; Touhy/Lehigh	Jefferson Park; Jefferson Park ( ■)	Monday–Saturday	173,833	Forest Glen
86; Narragansett/Ridgeland	Norwood Park; Imlay/Milwaukee	Oak Park; Ridgeland ( ■)	Weekdays	489,025	Forest Glen
87 N87; 87th	Wrightwood; 87th/Western; Oak Lawn; 87th/Cicero	South Chicago; 91st/Commercial	Daily	2,429,613	77th
87 N87; 87th	Wrightwood; 87th/Western	Chatham; 87th ( ■)	Night	2,429,613	77th
88; Higgins	Norwood Park; Devon/Canfield	Jefferson Park; Jefferson Park ( ■)	Daily	272,121	Forest Glen
90; Harlem	Norwood Park; Harlem ( ■)	Oak Park; Harlem/Lake ( ■)	Daily	1,086,262	Forest Glen
91; Austin	Jefferson Park; Jefferson Park ( ■)	Austin; Austin/Roosevelt	Daily	1,334,859	Forest Glen
92; Foster	Jefferson Park; Jefferson Park ( ■)	Edgewater; Berwyn ( ■)	Daily	1,592,832	Forest Glen/ North Park
93; California/Dodge	Evanston; Davis ( ■)	Logan Square; Logan Square ( ■)	Daily	889,308	North Park
94; California	Roscoe Village; Rockwell/Addison	West Englewood; 74th/Damen	Daily	3,021,830	74th
95; 95th	Gresham; 87th/Damen	South Chicago; 92nd/Buffalo	Daily	1,672,893	103rd
96; Lunt	Lincolnwood; Devon/Kedzie	Rogers Park; Morse ( ■)	Weekdays	158,489	North Park
97; Skokie	Skokie; Dempster–Skokie ( ■); Old Orchard Mall	Rogers Park; Howard ( ■■■)	Daily	682,512	North Park
100; Jeffery Manor Express	Roseland; 95th/Dan Ryan ( ■)	East Side; 112th/Avenue C	Weekday rush	101,997	103rd
103; West 103rd	Mount Greenwood; 104th/Pulaski	Roseland; 95th/Dan Ryan ( ■)	Daily	493,266	103rd
106; East 103rd	Roseland; 95th/Dan Ryan ( ■)	South Deering; 103rd/Stony Island	Daily	275,268	103rd
108; Halsted/95th	Roseland; 95th/Dan Ryan ( ■)	West Pullman; 127th/Lowe	Weekday rush	180,823	103rd
111; 111th/King Drive	Roseland; 95th/Dan Ryan ( ■)	Morgan Park; 117th/Marshfield	Daily	700,957	103rd
111A; Pullman Shuttle	South Deering; 103rd/Stony Island	West Roseland; 115th/Cottage Grove	Daily	109,684	103rd
112; Vincennes/111th	Mount Greenwood; 111th/Pulaski	Roseland; 95th/Dan Ryan ( ■)	Daily	360,608	103rd
115; Pullman/115th	Roseland; 95th/Dan Ryan ( ■)	Morgan Park; 117th/Marshfield	Daily	643,235	103rd
119; Michigan/119th	Roseland; 95th/Dan Ryan ( ■)	Morgan Park; 119th/Western	Daily	884,661	103rd
120; Ogilvie/Streeterville Express	West Loop Gate; Ogilvie	Streeterville; Fairbanks/Chicago	Weekday rush	187,910	Chicago (PM); Kedzie/77th (AM)
121; Union/Streeterville Express	West Loop Gate; Union Station	Streeterville; Fairbanks/Chicago	Weekday rush	239,698	Chicago/Kedzie; 77th (AM)
124; Navy Pier	West Loop Gate; Union/Ogilvie Stations	Streeterville; Navy Pier	Daily	389,924	Kedzie
125; Water Tower Express	Streeterville; Chestnut/Mies	Near West Side; Desplaines/Harrison	Weekday rush	139,506	Kedzie/Chicago; 77th (AM)
126; Jackson	South Austin; Jackson/Austin	The Loop; Michigan/Ida B. Wells	Daily	1,269,367	Kedzie
128; Soldier Field Express	West Loop Gate; Ogilvie/Union Stations	Near South Side; Soldier Field	Bears games	8,422	103rd
130; Museum Campus	West Loop Gate; Ogilvie/Union Stations	Near South Side; Museum Campus	Summer	N/A	Kedzie
134; Stockton/LaSalle Express	Lakeview East; Sheridan/Briar (SB); Sheridan/Belmont (SB)	The Loop; Adams/Wacker (SB); Franklin/Jackson (NB)	Weekday rush	428,975	Kedzie
135; Clarendon/LaSalle Express	Uptown; Clarendon/Sunnyside	The Loop; Adams/Wacker (SB); Franklin/Jackson (NB)	Weekday rush	410,443	North Park
136; Sheridan/LaSalle Express	Rogers Park; Sheridan/Devon	The Loop; Adams/Wacker (SB); Franklin/Jackson (NB)	Weekday rush	270,322	North Park
143; Stockton/Michigan Express	Lakeview East; Sheridan/Briar (SB); Sheridan/Belmont (NB)	The Loop; Michigan/Ida B. Wells	Weekday rush	226,068	Kedzie
146; Inner Lake Shore/ Michigan Express	Edgewater; Berwyn ( ■)	Near South Side; Museum Campus	Daily	3,558,679	North Park
146; Inner Lake Shore/ Michigan Express	Edgewater; Berwyn ( ■)	Near South Side; Roosevelt ( ■■■) (early morning)	Daily	3,558,679	North Park
147; Outer DuSable Lake Shore Express	Rogers Park; Howard ( ■■■)	The Loop; Michigan/Ida B. Wells	Daily	2,973,379	North Park
148; Clarendon/Michigan Express	Uptown; Foster/Marine	The Loop; State/Harrison ( ■)	Weekday rush	370,304	North Park
151; Sheridan	Rogers Park; Arthur/Clark	West Loop Gate; Union Station	Daily	4,158,560	North Park/ Kedzie
152; Addison	Belmont Terrace; Addison/Cumberland	Lakeview East; Lake Shore/Waveland	Daily	2,239,635	Forest Glen/ North Park
155; Devon	Lincolnwood; Devon/Kedzie	Rogers Park; Morse ( ■)	Daily	1,604,185	North Park
156; LaSalle	Lakeview; Belmont/Halsted	West Loop Gate; Union Station	Weekdays	1,009,697	Kedzie
157; Streeterville/Taylor	North Lawndale; Pulaski ( ■)	Streeterville; Chestnut/Lake Shore	Weekdays	1,348,571	Chicago
165; West 65th	Nottingham Park; 64th/Old Harlem	Garfield Ridge; Midway ( ■)	Weekday rush	39,065	74th
169; 69th/UPS Express	Grand Crossing; 69th ( ■)	Hodgkins; UPS Hodgkins	Weekdays	32,300	103rd
171; U. of Chicago/Hyde Park	East Hyde Park; 54th/South Shore	Woodlawn; 60th/University	Monday–Saturday	223,887	103rd
172; U. of Chicago/Kenwood	Kenwood; Hyde Park/East End	Woodlawn; 60th/University	Daily	506,411	103rd
192; U. of Chicago Hospitals Express	West Loop Gate; Clinton/Madison	Hyde Park; 57th/Cottage Grove	Weekday rush	110,242	103rd
192; U. of Chicago Hospitals Express	West Loop Gate; Clinton/Madison	Hyde Park; Goldblatt Pavilion	Weekday rush	110,242	103rd
201; Central/Ridge	Skokie; Old Orchard Mall	Rogers Park; Howard ( ■■■)	Monday–Saturday	343,112	North Park
206; Evanston Circulator	Evanston; Central/Crawford	Rogers Park; Howard ( ■■■)	Weekday rush	87,082	Forest Glen/ North Park

== Former routes ==
Route Name	Terminus	Terminus	Operated	Garage	Notes
X3 King Drive Express	95th/St. Lawrence	Erie/Fairbanks	Weekday rush	77th	Discontinued February 7, 2010.
5 Jeffery Local	79th/South Shore Drive	Wacker/Columbus	Daily	52nd	Renumbered as Route 6 Local on January 24, 1982. Number reused on N5 South Shore Night Bus.
5B Yates/Colfax	87th/Yates	104th/Torrence	Daily	77th	Created March 26, 1972. Renumbered 6B on January 24, 1982.
6 Van Buren	Downtown	Van Buren/Kedzie	Daily	Kedzie	Combined with 126 Jackson on April 8, 1956.
6 Garfield	Downtown	55th/Cicero Ave	Daily	69th	Replaced by 55 Garfield on September 28, 1969. Number reused on 6 Jeffery Express on October 13, 1975.
6B Yates/Colfax	87th/Yates	104th/Torrence	Daily	77th	Created January 24, 1982. Discontinued November 30, 1984.
7A Harrison/Adams	Downtown	Adams/Racine Ave	Daily	Kedzie	Discontinued September 9, 1973.
10 Lincoln/Larrabee	Downtown	Peterson/Lincoln	Daily	North Park	Discontinued September 9, 1973; consolidated with Route 11.
10 Lunch Loop	Downtown	Greektown	Midday	Archer	Created August 5, 1992. Discontinued July 2, 1993; number reused on 10 Museum of Science & Industry November 24, 1995.
13 Elston	Downtown	Belmont/Elston	Daily	Forest Glen	Renumbered from 55 on June 20, 1959. Discontinued September 9, 1973.
13 Southwest Skokie	Niles Center/Oakton	Jefferson Park (Blue)	Daily	Forest Glen	Created March 4, 1974. Discontinued September 5, 1976; replaced by Pace Bus 226.
14 14th Street	14th/Canal	14th/Damen	Daily	Lawndale	Discontinued March 9, 1955
14 Devon/Cicero	Downtown	Devon/Kedzie	Daily	Forest Glen	Created March 5, 1957 as a renumbering of 54A. Split into 54A and 155A on June 11, 1979
14 Jeffery Express	Washington/Jefferson	103rd/Stony Island	Weekends	103rd	Created on January 24, 1982. Renamed to J14 Jeffery Jump in 2012.
15 Canal/Wacker	Downtown	Canal/Archer	Daily	Archer	Discontinued January 24, 1982. Number reused August 5, 1992
15 Shopping Loop	Downtown	Water Tower	Midday	Archer	Created August 5, 1992. Discontinued June 28, 1996. Number reused on 15 Jeffery Local August 31, 2003
16 Lake	Columbus/South Water	Lake/Austin	Daily	Chicago	Discontinued October 5, 1997
17 Jackson Park Beach	Downtown Chicago	Jackson Park Beach	[?]	[?]	Summer only shuttle; discontinued by 1951
17 Westchester	Forest Park (Blue)	Canterbury/Balmoral	Weekday rush	Kedzie	Created on December 9, 1951. Discontinued December 16, 2012; replaced by Pace 317
19 Devon/Northwest Express	Logan Square	Devon/Harlem	Weekday rush	Forest Glen	Discontinued February 1, 1970. Number reused on 19 Stadium Express (now 19 United Center Express)
X20 Washington/Madison Express	Austin	Michigan	Weekday rush	Chicago	Discontinued February 7, 2010.
X21 Cermak Express	Downtown	North Riverside Park Mall	Weekday/holiday rush	Kedzie	X21 Cermak Express was eliminated due to the reopening of the Cermak Branch of the Blue Line on weekends.
21A Fulton/21st Street	Downtown	21st/Marshall	Daily	Kedzie	Internal accounting number for local streetcar service, not publicly used. Discontinued on May 8, 1947, partially replaced by 15 Canal/Wacker
21B West Cermak	54th/Cermak (Pink)	Riverside Park Mall	[?]	Kedzie	Renumbered Route 25 on November 30, 1975
23 Morgan/Racine	Union Stockyards	Ashland/Erie	Weekday rush	Archer	Discontinued September 13, 1981
23 Washington Express	Downtown	Harlem/Lake (Green)	Daily	Kedzie	Created January 9, 1994 due to the closure of the Green Line due to renovation. Discontinued May 12, 1996 when the Green Line reopened
24 Windsor Park	79th/Stony Island	92nd/Commercial	[?]	Kedzie	Replaced by rerouted Route 27 on September 7, 1963. Reused February 15, 1976 on the 24 Wentworth (previously a streetcar)
25 Hegewisch	108th/Ewing	Hegewisch	Daily	77th Street	Combined with Route 30 in 1952.
25 West Cermak	54th/Cermak (Pink)	North Riverside Park Mall	Daily	Kedzie	Renumbered from 21B on November 30, 1975. 25 West Cermak was eliminated and replaced by an extension of 21 Cermak on June 18, 2006, when weekday service was added for the section that was Route 25 (weekend service on Route 21 for that section was added on December 19, 1998)
26 26th	26th/Cottage Grove	26th/Halsted	Daily	Archer	Combined with Route 31 on February 5, 1956 (this section was removed on November 10, 1975). Number reused on 26 South Shore Express on August 26, 2003
27 South Deering	King Drive (Green)	112th/Torrence	Daily	103rd	Combined with Route 71 on August 31, 2003.
X28 Stony Island Express	Olive-Harvey College	Union Station	Weekday rush	103rd	Discontinued December 16, 2012.
29 Cottage Grove	95th/Cottage Grove	115th/Cottage Grove	Daily	Burnside/Cottage Grove	Internal accounting number for local streetcar service; became part of Route 4 when service was converted to buses on June 19, 1955. Number reused on 29 State on February 15, 1976.
30 Whiting-East Chicago	63rd/South Park	East Chicago	Daily	Burnside/Cottage Grove	Internal accounting number for local streetcar service, not publicly used. On June 9, 1940, service in Indiana was converted to buses and removed. That same day, it was rerouted in Illinois, replacing the streetcar portion of Route 32, and the route was renamed 30 South Chicago-Ewing. Converted to buses on June 30, 1947, and 30 South Chicago-Ewing merged with 25 Hegewisch to form the 30 South Chicago in 1952.
32 Hammond	63rd/Stony Island	Hammond	Daily	Archer	Internal accounting number for local streetcar service, not publicly used. Discontinued June 9, 1940 when Indiana service was converted to buses, and the rest was replaced by Route 30.
32 West 31st	31st/Kilbourn	35th/Archer (Orange)	Weekday rush	Archer	Originally Route 31A; discontinued October 5, 1997
33 Indiana	51st/Indiana	Downtown	Daily	Cottage Grove (later 52nd)	Internal accounting number for local streetcar service, not publicly used. On June 29, 1952, weekend service was discontinued as Route 38, a bus route, was created to replace streetcar service on weekends. Discontinued on May 24, 1953, when all streetcar service was discontinued and Route 38 was extended to serve all seven days a week.
33 Magnificent Mile Express	Clybourn Metra	Western Avenue Metra	Morning rush	Chicago	Created April 7, 1989. Discontinued March 31, 2013
34 State	Downtown	119th/Morgan	Daily	77th Street	Internal accounting number for local streetcar service, not publicly used. Combined with 36 Broadway on August 19, 1937; 34A Riverdale was renumbered to 34 South Michigan the same day.
34A Riverdale	119th/Michigan	138th/Indiana	Daily	Burnside	Connected with Route 34 State. Renumbered 34 South Michigan on August 19, 1937.
36A Devon	Clark/Devon	Kedzie/Devon	Daily	North Park	Created by June 21, 1931; became part of 36 Broadway on July 10, 1932. This section became Route 36A again when it was converted to buses on December 15, 1947. Combined with Route 155 on October 18, 1953.
36A State	95th/Dan Ryan (Red)	Navy Pier	Daily	103rd	Renumbered Route 29 on February 15, 1976.
37A Webster/Racine	Webster/Racine	Webster/Racine	Daily	52nd	Internal accounting number for local streetcar service, not publicly used. Combined with Route 37 upon conversion to buses on September 1, 1947
37A Sedgwick/Armitage	Adams/Wells	Armitage (Brown Purple)	Weekday Rush	n/a	Temporary route to expand weekday rush service for Brown line station closures during the Wells street bridge project.
38 Lincoln/Rosehill	Howard/McCormick	Downtown	Daily	Lincoln	Internal accounting number for local streetcar service, not publicly used. Renumbered Route 11 upon conversion to buses on March 11, 1951.
38 Indiana	63rd/Indiana	Downtown	Daily	52nd	Created on June 29, 1952, as the bus variant of streetcar Route 33, running weekends only. On May 24, 1953, streetcar service was converted to buses, service extended to all seven days a week, and service extended south from 51st Street to 63rd Street. Combined into 1 Indiana-Hyde Park north of 51st Street and discontinued south of 51st Street on September 13, 1981. This section south of 51st Street was restored as Route 38 on February 6, 1983, and discontinued January 24, 1988.
38 Michigan Express	Ashland/63rd (Green)	63rd/Stony Island	Daily	52nd	Created January 9, 1994 due to the closure of the Green Line due to renovation. Discontinued May 12, 1996 when the Green Line reopened.
38 Ogden/Taylor	Ogilvie and Union Stations	Cermak/Pulaski	Weekday rush	Kedzie	Combined with Route 157 on September 6, 2009.
40 Lincoln-Riverview	Downtown	Peterson/Lincoln	Daily	Lincoln	Internal accounting number for local streetcar service, not publicly used. Renumbered Route 10 when service was converted to buses on February 18, 1951.
40 Planetarium	CMC summer beach shuttle		Summer only	Wilcox	Created in 1951; combined with Route 126 Jackson by 1970.
40 O'Hare Express	Jefferson Park (Blue)	O'Hare Airport	Daily	Forest Glen	The section from Jefferson Park to River Road was discontinued after the Blue Line was extended to Rosemont on February 27, 1983. The Blue Line was extended to O'Hare on September 3, 1984, and Route 40 was discontinued that day.
40 Chinatown/Pilsen Shuttle	Roosevelt/State	Damen/Roosevelt	Weekdays and holidays	Kedzie	Created on May 28, 2005. Discontinued on December 16, 2012.
41 Elston/Clybourn	Belmont/Kimball	Elston/Milwaukee	Daily	Forest Glen	Discontinued October 5, 1997.
42 Halsted/Archer	79th/Halsted	Randolph/Clark	Weekday rush	Forest Glen	Discontinued on November 7, 1993, upon opening of the Orange Line to Midway. Restored March 27, 1994. Discontinued October 5, 1997.
42A Vincennes	111th/Vincennes	119th/Vincennes	Weekday rush	Beverly	Internal accounting number for local streetcar service, not publicly used. Converted to buses as an extension of Route 119 on July 22, 1946.
45 Ashland/Archer	Downtown	39th/Ashland	Weekday rush	69th	Discontinued on November 7, 1993, upon opening of the Orange Line to Midway.
46 Southport	Southport/Cortland	Southport/Irving Park	Daily	Limits	Discontinued on August 5, 1973.
47A West 47th	47th/Archer	47th/Cicero	Daily	Limits	Replaced by Route 47 on September 11, 1966
49A South Western	79th/Western	135th/Western (Blue Island)	Weekday rush	77th	Discontinued December 16, 2012; replaced by Pace 349
50A South Damen	87th/Damen	Western (Orange)	Weekday rush	74th	Renumbered from Route 48 in 1954; changed back to Route 48 in 1976
53AL South Pulaski Limited	115th/Keeler	Pulaski (Orange) (morning); 31st/Komensky (afternoon)	Weekday rush	Archer	Discontinued February 7, 2010
X54 Cicero Express	Jefferson Park (Blue)	Midway (Orange)	Weekdays	Chicago	Discontinued February 7, 2010
55 Elston	Downtown	Belmont/Elston	Daily	Forest Glen	Renumbered Route 13 on June 20, 1959. Route 55 reused on split of Route 51 that same day
X55 Garfield Express	Museum of Science and Industry	Midway (Orange)	Weekday rush	74th	Discontinued February 7, 2010
56A North Milwaukee	Jefferson Park (Blue)	Milwaukee/Imlay (non-rush); Devon/Avondale (rush)	Weekdays	Forest Glen	Discontinued December 16, 2012; replaced by Pace 270.
58 Ogden	Ogilvie and Union Stations	52nd/25th	Daily	Lawndale	Combined with Route 37 on September 13, 1981 (Route 37 service on Sheffield was discontinued).
58A Ogden Extension	Ogden/Ashland	Armitage/Clark	Daily	Limits	Renumbered Route 98 on April 18, 1976.
61 Montrose Beach	Cermak/Kilbourn	Ford City Mall	Daily	Chicago	Replaced by Route 81A on July 3, 1953.
61 Archer/Franklin Express	Archer/Neva	Merchandise Mart	Daily	Chicago	Created November 25, 1979; discontinued on July 3, 1994, as most riders switched to the Orange Line to Midway.
X62 Archer Express	Downtown	63rd/Cicero	Daily	Chicago	Discontinued on July 3, 1994, as most riders switched to the Orange Line to Midway.
64 Argo	Cermak/Kilbourn	Ford City Mall	Daily	Chicago	Renumbered Route 54B in 1952.
64 Foster/Lawrence	Foster/Lawrence	Foster/Lawrence	Weekdays	Forest Glen	Created February 1, 1970 as a split from 85A Foster-Central; split into Routes 69, 81W, and 92W on February 27, 1983.
64 Foster/Canfield	Foster/Canfield	Harlem (Blue - O'Hare branch)	Weekdays	Forest Glen	Created January 24, 1988; discontinued December 16, 2012.
64X Cumberland Express	Cumberland Ave/Kennedy Expwy	Foster/Lawrence	Weekdays	Forest Glen	Created May 25, 1972 as a split from 40 O'Hare Express; renumbered Route 69 on March 31, 1976.
68 Division	Mozart/Division	Wells/Division	Daily	Kedzie	Internal accounting number for local streetcar service, not publicly used. Combined with Route 70 upon conversion to buses on February 4, 1951. Number reused on current Route 68 Northwest Highway on February 1, 1970.
69 Cumberland Express	Cumberland Avenue/Kennedy Expwy	[?]	Weekdays	Forest Glen	Route number was originally skipped to avoid confusion with Route 67 operating via 69th Street. Created March 31, 1976 as a renumbering of Route 64X; split into 69 Foster/East River, 81W West Lawrence, and 92W West Foster on February 27, 1983.
69 Foster/East River	Harlem (Blue - O'Hare branch)	Cumberland (Blue)	Weekdays	Forest Glen	Created on February 27, 1983, as a split of old 69 Cumberland Express; split into 69 Cumberland/East River and 64 Foster/Canfield on January 24, 1988.
69 Cumberland/East River	Lawrence/East River	Cumberland (Blue)	Weekdays	Forest Glen	Created on February 27, 1988, as a split of old 69 Foster/East River. Discontinued December 16, 2012.
X80 Irving Park Express	Harlem; Irving Park (Blue) (midday/weekend)	Lake Shore	Daily	Forest Glen	Discontinued February 7, 2010.
82 Devon	Kedzie/Devon	Clark/Devon	Daily	Devon	Internal accounting number for local streetcar service, not publicly used. Renumbered Route 36A by June 21, 1931 (became part of 36 Broadway on July 10, 1932); number reused on 82 Kimball (now 82 Kimball/Homan) on June 21, 1931.
83 83rd	Jeffery/South Chicago	83rd/Lakefront	Daily	Forest Glen	Sunday service removed September 10, 1961. Combined with Route 95 on September 8, 1963.
84 North Ashland	Irving Park/Ashland	Fullerton/Ashland	Daily	Lincoln/Noble/69th St.	Internal accounting number for local streetcar service, not publicly used. Combined with Route 9 on August 21, 1936. Number reused for 84 Peterson on June 19, 1939.
89 Yates/95th	91st/Baltimore	104th/Torrence	Daily	Kedzie	Replaced by Route 71 on December 20, 1971.
89 North Kedzie	Logan Square (Blue)	Kedzie/Lawrence	Daily	Kedzie	Created June 21, 1982. Discontinued on February 2, 1992.
90N North Harlem	Harlem (Blue - O'Hare branch)	Touhy/Overhill	Monday-Saturday	Forest Glen	Discontinued December 16, 2012.
92A West Foster	Foster/Canfield	Foster/Milwaukee	Daily	Forest Glen	Merged into Route 85A on February 20, 1955.
92W West Foster	Jefferson Park (Blue)	Harlem (Blue - O'Hare branch)	Daily	Forest Glen	Discontinued January 24, 1988.
93 93rd	92nd/Buffalo	95th/Dan Ryan (Red)	Daily	103rd	Combined with Route 95.
95E 93rd/95th	92nd/Buffalo	95th/Dan Ryan (Red)	Daily	103rd	Split from Route 95 on November 25, 1979. Combined with Route 95W to form Route 95 on September 4, 2016.
95W West 95th	95th/Western The Plaza	95th/Dan Ryan (Red)	Daily	103rd	Split from Route 95 on November 25, 1979. Combined with Route 95E to form Route 95 on September 4, 2016.
98 Roscoe	Lincoln/Belmont/Ashland	Western/Roscoe	Daily	Limits	Discontinued on August 5, 1973.
98 Ogden Extension	Ogden/Ashland	Armitage/Clark	Daily	Limits	Renumbered from Route 58A on April 18, 1976. Discontinued on September 13, 1981.
X98 Avon Express	Avon Morton Grove (Golf/Waukegan)	Jefferson Park (Blue)	Weekdays	Forest Glen	Discontinued March 20, 2023 due to low ridership.
99 Stevenson Express	Archer/Neva	Wacker/Dearborn or State/Kinzie	Weekday rush	Archer	Discontinued on September 5, 1997. Riders switched to the Orange Line to Midway.
99M Midway Express	Downtown	Midway Airport	Weekday rush	Archer	Discontinued on July 3, 1994. Riders switched to the Orange Line to Midway.
X99 Chicago Manufacturing Campus Express	95th/Dan Ryan (Red)	Chicago Manufacturing Campus	Weekday rush	103rd	Discontinued on March 27, 2005, due to low ridership.
104 Pullman	93rd/Cottage Grove	115th/Cottage Grove	Daily	Beverly	Combined with Route 111 on June 26, 1988.
110 Marquette	Marquette/Kostner	Ashland/63rd (Green)	Daily	74th	Discontinued October 5, 1997.
111 Pullman/111th/115th	95th/Dan Ryan (Red)	112th/Corliss	Daily	103rd	Route split into 2 routes: 111 111th/King Drive and 115 Pullman/115th.
119 Vincennes/119th	111th/Vincennes	119th/Halsted	Daily	Beverly	Discontinued June 16, 1963. Service on 119th restored as part of Route 34 on September 28, 1969, and became 119 Michigan/119th on September 8, 1985.
122 Illinois Center/North Western Express	Canal/Washington	Columbus/Wacker	Weekday rush	Kedzie	Discontinued December 16, 2012.
123 Illinois Center/Union Express	Union Station	Wacker/Columbus	Weekday rush	103rd	Discontinued December 16, 2012.
127 Jackson/Independence	Downtown	14th/Independence	Daily	Kedzie	Discontinued January 28, 1973.
127 Madison/Roosevelt Circulator	Roosevelt (Red Green Orange)		Weekday rush	Kedzie	Established January 24, 1982. Discontinued June 15, 2008.
128 Wacker/Orleans	Union Station	Merchandise Mart	Daily	Forest Glen	Discontinued September 7, 1986. Replaced with 41 Elston-Clybourn.
129 West Loop/South Loop	Clinton/Washington	14th/Indiana	Weekday rush	Archer	Discontinued December 16, 2012.
131 Washington	Austin/Madison	Michigan/Washington	Daily	Chicago	Discontinued October 5, 1997.
132 Goose Island Express	Clybourn Metra station	Congress/Michigan	Weekday rush	Chicago	Discontinued December 17, 2018 due to low ridership.
134 Diversey	Downtown	Wrightwood/Pulaski	Daily	North	Combined with Route 76 on June 19, 1955.
136 Douglas	Downtown	[?]	Daily	Kedzie	Discontinued September 9, 1973.
142 Union Depot/Shopping District	Downtown	Madison/Wabash	Weekday rush	Kedzie	Discontinued June 19, 1964.
144 Marine/Michigan Express	Berwyn (Red)	State/Congress	Weekday rush	North Park	Discontinued December 16, 2012.
145 Wilson/Michigan Express	Ravenswood/Wilson; Grace/Lake Shore Drive (rush)	Congress/Wells	Daily	North Park / Kedzie	Discontinued December 16, 2012.
148 Monroe Parking Lot	Downtown		Weekday	Kedzie	Discontinued January 28, 1973.
149 Michigan State/Wacker	Downtown	Soldier Field	Weekday	Limits	Discontinued January 24, 1982.
N151 Sheridan (Owl)	Berwyn (Red)	Union Station	Daily-Overnight	North Park	Discontinued March 31, 2013.
153 Wilson/Michigan	Downtown	Wilson/Ravenswood	Weekday	Limits	Discontinued June 22, 1980.
154 Lunt	Devon/Kedzie	Morse (Red)	Weekday	Rosemont	Combined into Route 96 on September 9, 1956.
154 Wrigley Field Express	DeVry Parking Lot	Wrigley Field	Cubs games	North Park	Discontinued March 2014.
155A West Devon	Devon/Cicero	Devon/Kedzie	Daily	Forest Glen	Discontinued September 13, 1981.
158 Wacker/North Western Station	Devon/Cicero	Devon/Kedzie	Weekday rush	Kedzie	Split into Route 120, Route 121, and Route 125 on January 27, 1975.
162 Pulaski/Stevenson Express	Downtown	115th/Pulaski	Weekday rush	Archer	Discontinued July 3, 1994 as most riders switched to the Orange Line to Midway.
164 Narragansett Express	63rd/Archer	Wacker/Dearborn or State/Kinzie	Weekday rush	Archer	Discontinued September 5, 1997 as most riders switched to the Orange Line to Midway.
168 UIC/Pilsen Express	UIC–Halsted (Blue)	UPS Hodgkins	Weekday rush	Kedzie	Discontinued May 14, 2010.
170 U of Chicago/Midway	57th/Stony Island	59th/Ellis	Weekdays	103rd	Discontinued August 2016 due to low ridership.
173 U of Chicago/Lakeview Express	59th/Kimbark	Belmont/Halsted	Evening rush	103rd	Discontinued September 6, 2009.
174 U of Chicago/Garfield Stations	Garfield (Red) via Garfield (Green)	57th/Woodlawn	Weekday rush, Friday-Sunday evenings	103rd	Discontinued September 6, 2009.
200 Main Shuttle	Madison/Central Park (Skokie)	Main (Purple)	Weekday rush	North Park	Discontinued September 6, 2009 due to closure of Rand McNally Headquarters.
N201 Central/Sherman Night Bus	Central/Sherman	Howard (Red Purple Yellow)	Daily-Overnight	North Park	Discontinued December 16, 2012.
202 Main/Emerson	South Blvd./Sheridan	Evanston Davis Street station	Weekday rush	North Park	Discontinued June 22, 2003. Replaced by 200 Main Shuttle.
203 Ridge/Grant	Crawford/Central	Howard (Red Purple Yellow)	Weekday rush	North Park	Discontinued June 22, 2003. Replaced by 201 Central-Ridge and 205 Chicago-Golf.
204 Dodge	Evanston Davis Street station	Howard (Red Purple Yellow)	Weekday rush	North Park	Discontinued June 22, 2003. Combined with Route 93 North California.
205 Chicago/Golf	Howard (Red Purple Yellow)	Skokie Courthouse	Weekdays	Forest Glen/North Park	Discontinued September 4, 2018. Replaced By Pace 208 & 213.

== General references ==
- Borzo, Greg (2012). Chicago Cable Cars. The History Press. ISBN 978-1-60949-327-1.
- Krambles, George; Peterson, Arthur H. (1993). CTA at 45: A History of the First 45 Years of the Chicago Transit Authority. Oak Park, IL. ISBN 978-0-9637-9654-7. OCLC 29815755.
- Doyle, John F. (January 14, 2019). Chicago Motor Coach Company. Arcadia Publishing. ISBN 9781439666012.
