= Damen Avenue =

Street in Chicago

- Division Street (Note: in Blue Island); Robey Avenue (Note: in Harvey and Dixmoor); 2000 West
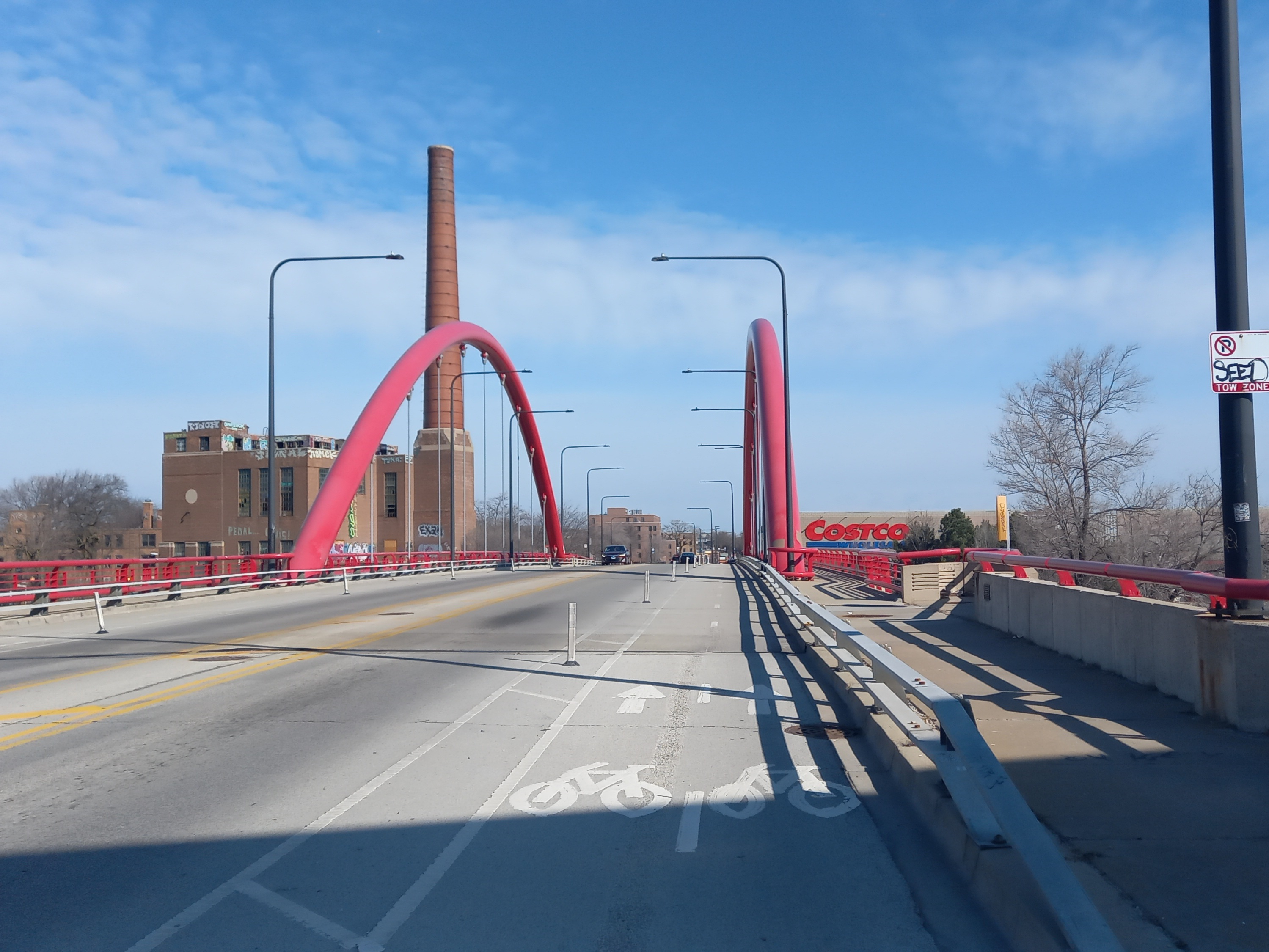
- Damen Avenue crossing above the North Branch Chicago River (March 2024)
- Former name: Robey Street
- Location: Markham, Harvey, Dixmoor, Blue Island, Chicago
- South end: 163rd Street/Dixie Highway in Markham
- North end: Howard Street/Custer Avenue at Chicago–Evanston line

Damen Avenue is a street in Chicago, where it is 2000 West in the grid. It is 2.5 miles (4.0 km) west of State Street, the city's north–south baseline. Known as Robey Street for politician James Robey prior to 1927, it was renamed in honor of Father Arnold Damen. However, the Robey name is retained in Harvey and Dixmoor as Robey Avenue.

== Route description ==
Throughout the south suburbs and the neighborhood of Beverly, the street assumes the role as disjointed residential streets. Damen Avenue is called Robey Avenue in Harvey and Dixmoor as well as Division Street in Blue Island. Between 153rd and 151st streets, Robey Avenue served as the eastern edge of the now-demolished Dixie Square Mall.

Damen Avenue resumes as a thoroughfare north of 87th Street/Beverly Boulevard. Damen Avenue is in proximity to the Robert Lindblom Math & Science Academy and Back of the Yards College Preparatory High School north of 63rd Street and south of 47th Street respectively. North of 47th Street, Damen Avenue has a wide, one-block-long median serving industries and a mall before the road ends shortly after.

Damen Avenue resumes at Pershing Road; however, the intersection is unusually designed with southbound traffic shifting one block west. Damen Avenue meets I-55 (Stevenson Expressway) a single-point urban interchange. Damen Avenue crosses over the South Branch Chicago River and the Chicago Sanitary and Ship Canal as well as industries surrounding the river. Damen Avenue crosses under a series of railroad tracks (including the BNSF Line) between 17th Street and 14th Street. The avenue then becomes a 4 or 5-lane divided highway through the Illinois Medical District. After crossing I-290 (Eisenhower Expressway) and the Blue Line, Damen Avenue serves Malcolm X College as well as the United Center, cutting through a series of parking lots. After Washington Boulevard, the avenue downgrades to a two-lane road.

Damen Avenue meets Milwaukee Avenue and North Avenue at a six-way intersection in the heart of Wicker Park. The Bloomingdale Trail serves Damen Avenue at Churchill Street. Damen Avenue meets I-90/I-94 (Kennedy Expressway), but access is limited to inbound expressway entrance and outbound expressway exit. Damen Avenue crosses over the North Branch Chicago River via a tied-arch bridge. This bridge is one of a few locations where there are two bike lanes per direction. At the six-way intersection of Diversey Parkway and Clybourn Avenue, Damen Avenue serves Lathrop Homes as well as retail stores like Costco. The roadway eventually ends at Bryn Mawr Avenue at the Rosehill Cemetery. Beyond the cemetery, Damen Avenue is a residential street once again. This residential street has a few gaps, one of which is home to the Misericordia Home. Damen Avenue ends at the northern city limits at Howard Street, where the road continues north as Custer Avenue in Evanston.

== History ==
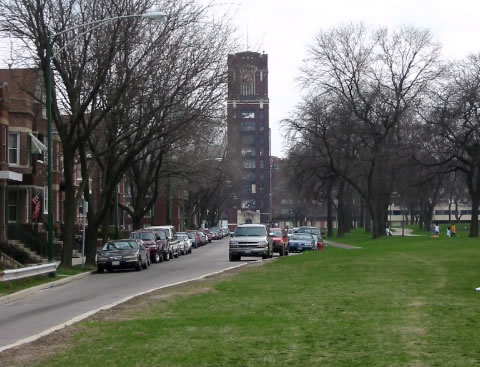
Northern end of the now-demolished bridge at 37th Street.

There was once a bridge crossing above railroads and industries between 47th Street and Pershing Road. The bridge opened in the early 1960s. It was closed on April 13, 1998, and the bridge has since been demolished. The closure forced CTA bus route 48 to reroute along Western Boulevard to maintain its connection to the 35th/Archer station. Remnants of the bridge exist as wide medians north of 47th Street and south of 37th Street. Route 48 now ends at Western station.

== Transportation ==
Plenty of train lines serve Damen Avenue: Damen station on the Pink Line, Illinois Medical District station and Damen station on the Blue Line, Damen station on the Green Line, and Damen station on the Brown Line.

Two CTA bus routes primarily run along Damen Avenue: routes 48 and 50. 48 South Damen, which only operates during weekday rush hour, runs from 87th Street to 47th Street, where it then turns west toward Western station. 50 Damen runs from Archer Avenue (after leaving 35th/Archer station) to Foster Avenue, where it then turns east toward the intersection of Ashland Avenue and Clark Street. There are bus routes that run along Damen Avenue for a short distance: CTA bus routes 12, 94, and 126, and Pace bus route 755.
