= Ashland station (CTA Orange Line) =

Chicago "L" station

Ashland 1600W 3000S
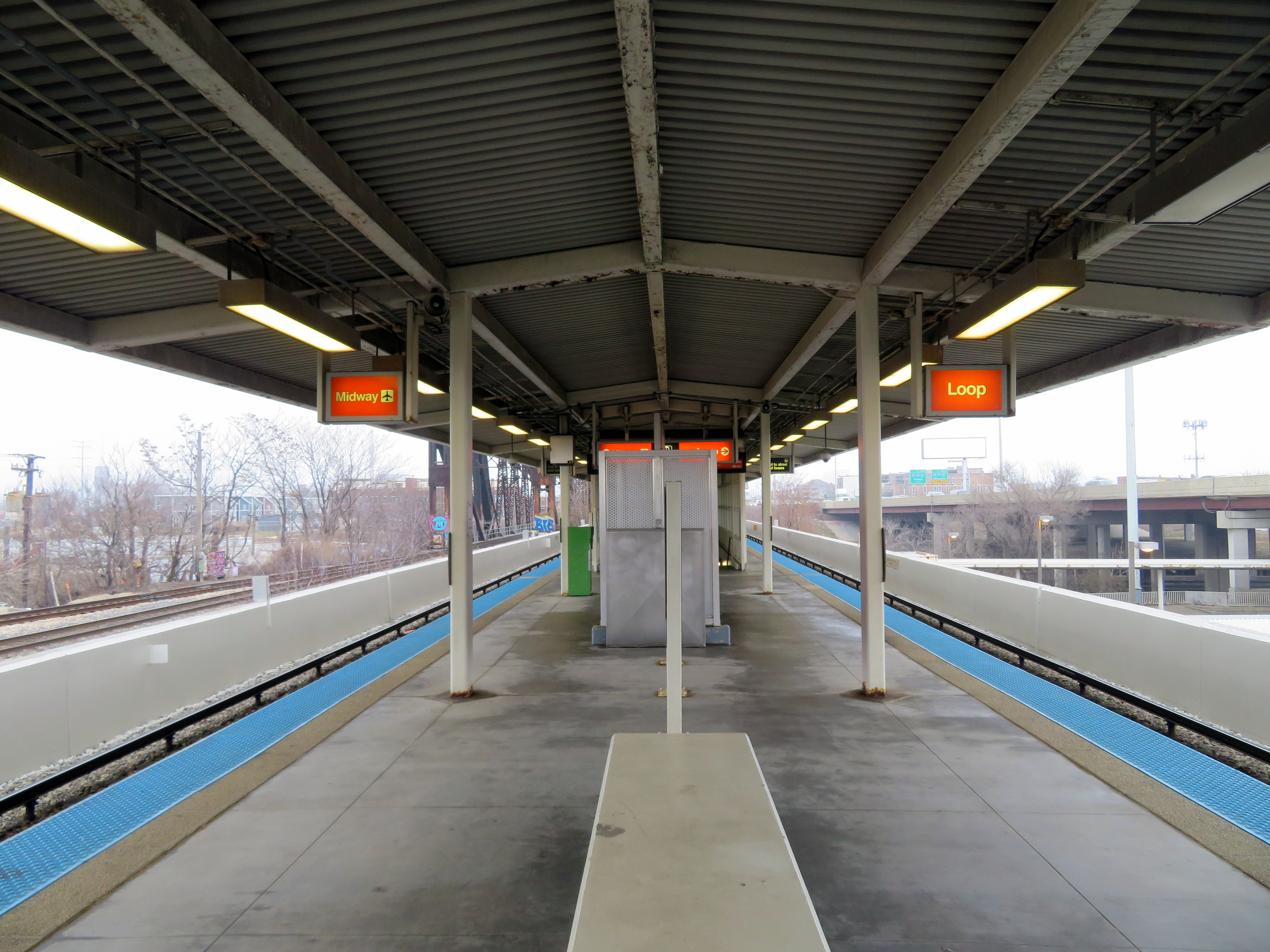

General information
- Location: 3011 South Ashland Avenue; Chicago, Illinois 60608
- Coordinates: 41.839234°N 87.665317°W
- Owner: Chicago Transit Authority
- Line: Midway Branch
- Platforms: 1 island platform
- Tracks: 2

Construction
- Structure type: Embankment
- Cycle facilities: Yes
- Accessible: Yes

History
- Opened: October 31, 1993; 32 years ago (formal opening); November 3, 1993; 32 years ago (full service)

Passengers
- 2025: 364,047 ▲2.9%

Services
Preceding station	Chicago "L"	Following station
35th/Archer toward Midway	Orange Line	Halsted toward Loop (Library)
Track layout
Location

Ashland is a station on the Chicago Transit Authority's 'L' system, serving the Orange Line. It is located at the intersection of Ashland Avenue and 31st Street near the Stevenson Expressway. Although located within the Lower West Side community area, the station mostly serves the Bridgeport and McKinley Park neighborhoods.

== History ==
Ashland, which opened on October 31, 1993, is similar to other stations on the Orange Line and has a layout based on those of the Dan Ryan Line, except that, unlike the last stations of the Dan Ryan Branch of the Red Line, this station is not located in the middle of an expressway. It is composed of a central platform overlooking the entrance and is equipped with escalators and elevators providing accessibility to passengers with disabilities. Unlike other stations on the Orange Line, Ashland does not have a park-and-ride facility.

== Bus connections ==
CTA

- 9 Ashland (Owl Service)
- X9 Ashland Express (weekday rush hours only)
- 31 31st (weekdays only)
- 62 Archer (Owl Service)

== See also ==
- Ashland (CTA Green and Pink Lines station)
- Ashland/63rd (CTA station)
