= North Riverside Park Mall =

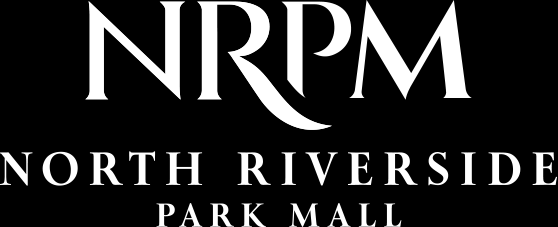

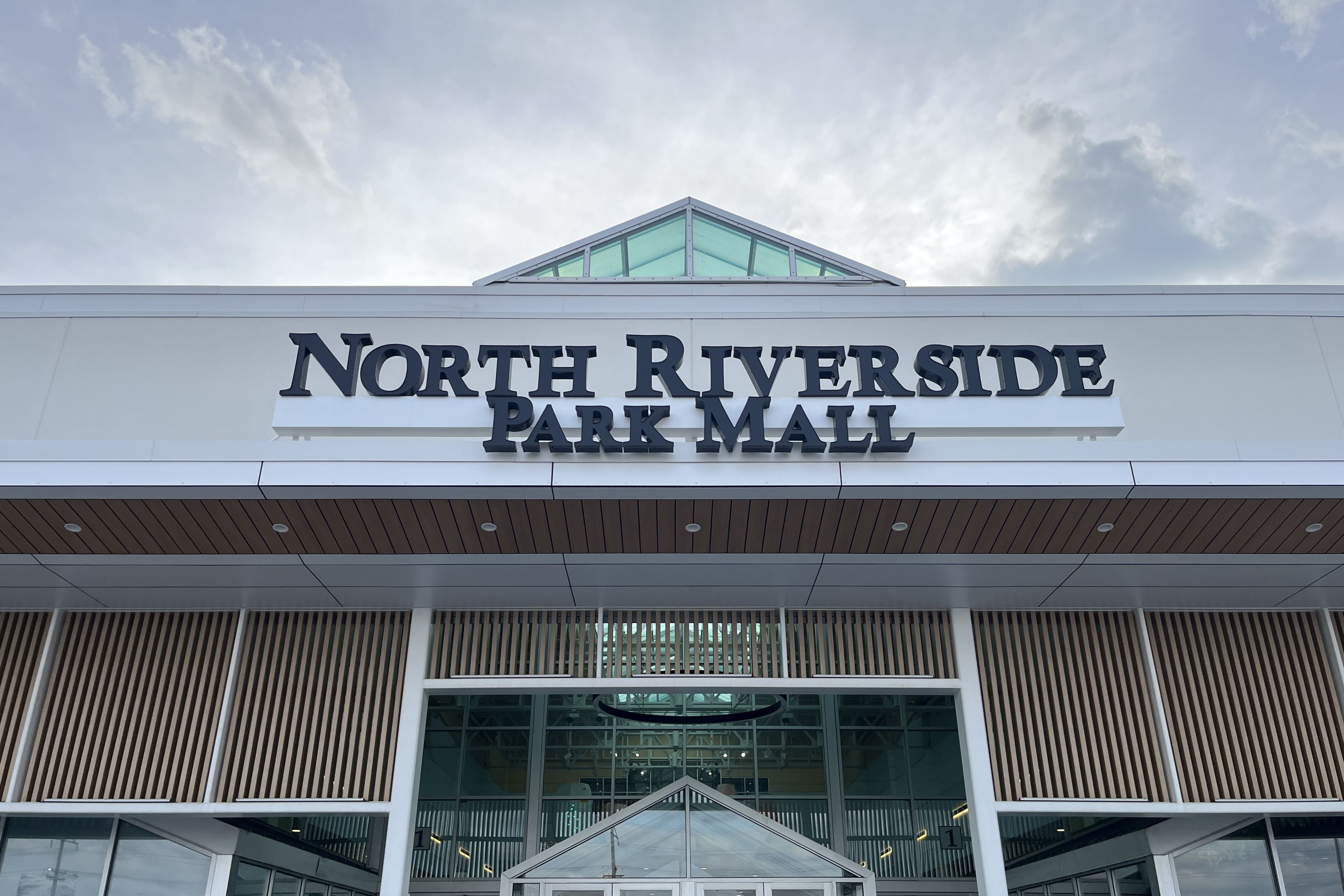
- Location: North Riverside, Illinois, United States
- Coordinates: 41.8472°N 87.81083°W
- Address: 7501 West Cermak Road
- Opened: 1975
- Developer: Heitman/Melvin Simon & Associates
- Owner: The Feil Organization
- Num. of stores: 148
- Num. of anchor tenants: 7 (5 open, 2 vacant)
- Floor area: 1,111,322 sq ft (103,245.2 m^{2})
- Floors: 2 (3rd floor offices in JCPenney)
- Public transit: Chicago Transit Authority, Pace

North Riverside Park Mall is a shopping mall located in North Riverside, Illinois. The center is owned by The Feil Organization and is anchored by JCPenney, Forman Mills and Round 1 Entertainment. One anchor store last occupied by Carson's is vacant since that store closed in 2018.

== History ==
In 1975, the mall opened with 3 department stores which were JCPenney, Carson Pirie Scott, and Montgomery Ward. Madigan's operated as a junior anchor in the mall until the early 1990s, when its space was divided between Foot Locker and TJ Maxx, both of which opened in 1994. By 2005, TJ Maxx closed and was replaced by Steve & Barry's. After that chain went out of business in 2009, its space was taken over by Conway, a division of National Stores. In May 2015, Conway was converted into Fallas.

The Sears store was originally occupied by Montgomery Ward until that chain ceased operations in 2001. The opening of Sears coincided with a $5 million renovation plan.

The Feil Organization acquired the Center in 2004 from Urban Properties.

In December 2010, portions of the film Contagion were filmed at the mall.

In 2015, Sears Holdings spun-off 235 of its properties, including the Sears at North Riverside Park Mall, into Seritage Growth Properties. In 2017, Sears downsized its store to the upper level and the lower level was remodeled to house Round One Entertainment and AMITA Health. In 2023, Seritage sold the property and adjacent parking lot to Fidelis Realty Partners.

On April 18, 2018, The Bon-Ton Stores, parent company of Carson's, announced it would cease operation and all stores would close. The North Riverside location closed on August 29, 2018. Fallas also closed in 2018.

In 2020, rioting affected the mall, which was still closed due to the COVID-19 pandemic, and surrounding shopping centers in North Riverside and neighboring Berwyn, resulting in break-ins, looting, and a shooting fatality on the property.

On July 1, 2020, it was announced that Sears would close in September 2020, as part of a plan to close 28 stores nationwide, leaving JCPenney as the only traditional anchor store left.

Aldi opened on the mall perimeter on January 26, 2023. The site is part of the property formerly owned by Seritage.

Major interior renovations at the end of 2024, which cost $9 million, included new flooring, ceilings, lighting and furnishings throughout the mall, as well as an update to the main entrance.

== Anchors ==
=== Current ===
- JCPenney – Opened in 1975
- Round 1 Entertainment – Opened in 2019
- Forman Mills – Opened in 2022

=== Former ===
- Montgomery Ward – Opened in 1975, closed in 2001, replaced by Sears
- Carson's – Opened in 1975, closed in 2018
- Sears – Opened in 2002, closed in 2020

== Bus routes ==
CTA

- 21 Cermak

Pace

- 322 Cermak Road/22nd Street
