= Back of the Yards College Preparatory High School =

Coordinates: 41.8075°N 87.6776°W

Location
- 2111 W. 47th Street, Chicago, Illinois 60609

Information
- School type: Public Secondary
- Motto: Be bold. Be brave. Be a Bobcat'.
- Established: 2013
- School district: Chicago Public Schools
- CEEB code: 140940
- Principal: Barbara Manjarrez
- Grades: 9-12
- Gender: Coed
- Enrollment: 1,015 (2025-26)
- Campus type: Urban
- Colors: Maroon; Orange
- Team name: Bobcats
- Newspaper: The Maroon
- Website: boycp.org
- Last updated: 23 May 2026

Back of the Yards College Preparatory High School, commonly known as Back of the Yards College Prep or BOYCP, is a public four-year international baccalaureate high school located in the New City community area on the southwest side of Chicago, Illinois, United States. Back of the Yards is operated by the Chicago Public Schools district and has a general education program in addition to an International Baccalaureate program. Back of the Yards College Prep was named after the neighborhood it is located in, Back of the Yards. Back of the Yards College Prep is accessible via the Chicago L's nearby Western Orange Line station.

== History ==
Back of the Yards College Prep's initial construction began on 4 October 2010. Chicago mayor Richard M. Daley and Alderman George Cardenas attended the school's ceremonial groundbreaking the following spring, on 26 April 2011, and actual construction of the school structure was scheduled to begin that summer. By May 2013, the school was "substantially" complete. On 8 August 2013, Chicago mayor Rahm Emanuel and CPS CEO Barbara Byrd-Bennett attended the opening of Back of the Yards College Prep. Emanuel stated that the school was "the most incredible school that [he had] seen in probably [his] entire career." Alderman Cardenas stated that the school was ten years in the making.

On 13 February 2015, during a forum among candidates running to become the next Mayor of Chicago, Rahm Emanuel erroneously stated that Back of the Yards College Prep had "one of the best graduation rates of any high school in the city", despite the fact that no students had graduated from the school at that point since the inaugural class was barely in its sophomore year.

On 10 June 2017, the graduation ceremony for the inaugural class took place.

== Architecture ==
Back of the Yards serves over 1,000 students in a 212,285 square foot building, constructed mainly from brick, glass and steel. The structure consists of a lower basement level, a ground level, and two upper floors, as well as an art wing to house art and music classes. The complex includes outdoor facilities like a softball field, tennis courts, and a combination soccer & football field that includes electronic scoreboards. Two reading gardens including cast concrete benches as well as cube seats and shade trees provide a quiet study space, and a native plant area contains signage with information on the featured fauna.

During construction, designers aimed to achieve LEED for Schools minimum “Silver” level certification for Back of the Yards, and the requirement for 25% of the roof space to be vegetated was exceeded. The green areas on the roofs, visible from classroom windows, were created with a sedum meadow mat system.

Alderman George Cardenas estimated an initial budget of $50 million, but Back of the Yards College Prep ended up costing approximately $95 million to construct - almost twice the expected budget. Previously, the Back of the Yards Branch of the Chicago Public Library was located in a strip mall on the north side of 47th street near the intersection of 47th and Damen (i.e. across the street from Back of the Yard's current location). The library's new location, constructed as a part of the school complex, is accessible via a ramp that is one block south of the school's entrance. The 9,000 square foot library includes a computer lab, a media lab, and a meeting room. Specific areas within the library that are intended for Back of the Yards students were also created.

== Academics ==
Back of the Yards College Prep has been an International Baccalaureate school since 18 February 2015, when it was authorized to offer the Diploma Programme. Forty-eight days later, the school became authorized to offer the Middle Years Programme on 7 April 2015, and forty-five days after that, on 22 May 2015, the school was authorized to offer the Career-related Programme. The following fall, juniors at Back of the Yards started taking DP and CP classes.
