= 35th/Archer station =

Chicago "L" station

35th/Archer 2200W 3500S
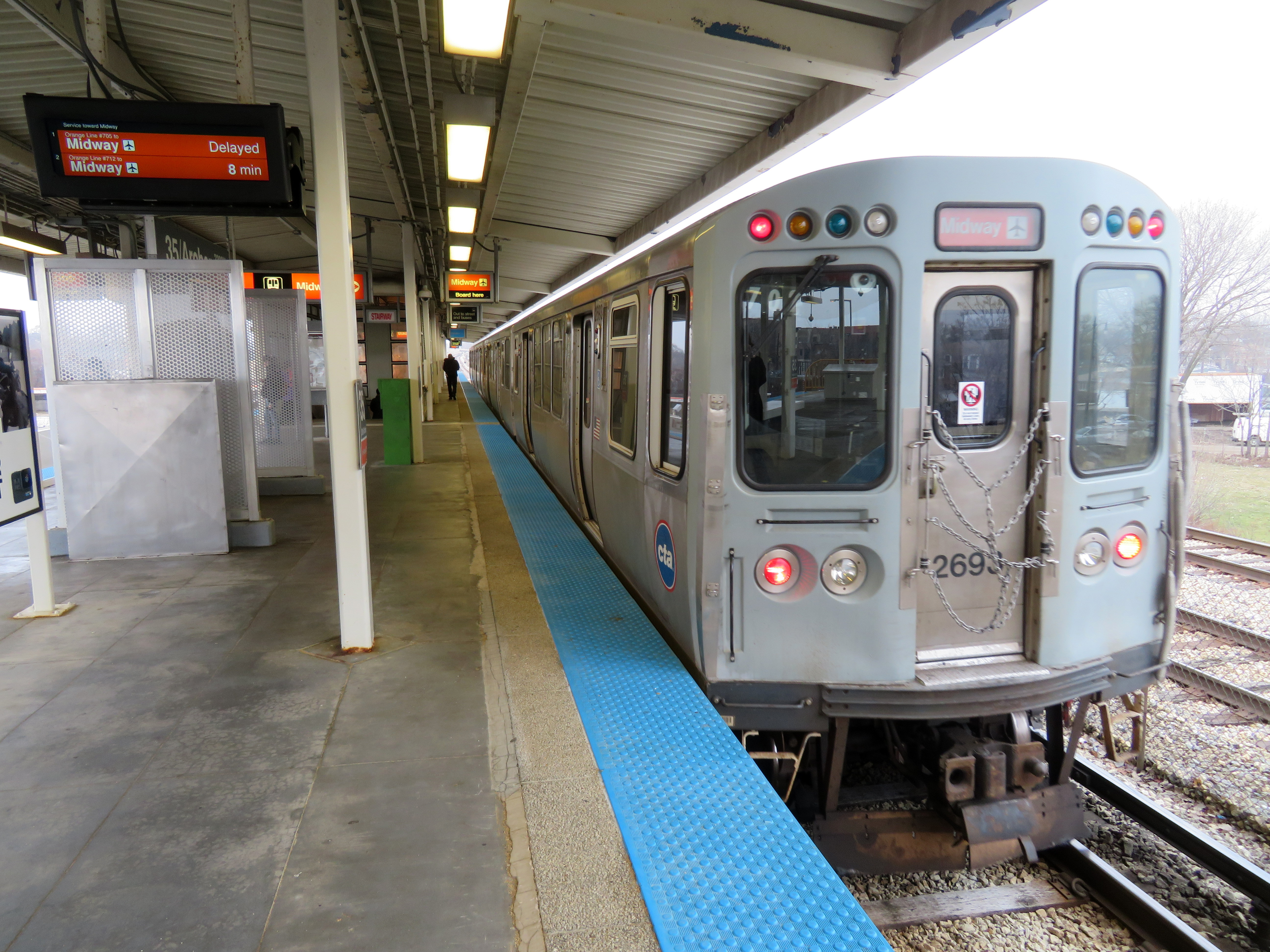
- Midway-bound train at 35th/Archer station in 2018

General information
- Location: 3528 South Leavitt Street; Chicago, Illinois
- Coordinates: 41.829353°N 87.680622°W
- Owner: Chicago Transit Authority
- Line: Midway Branch
- Platforms: 1 island platform
- Tracks: 2

Construction
- Structure type: Embankment
- Parking: 70 spaces
- Cycle facilities: Yes
- Accessible: Yes

History
- Opened: October 31, 1993; 32 years ago (formal opening); November 3, 1993; 32 years ago (full service)

Passengers
- 2025: 557,867 ▲3.3%

Services
Preceding station	Chicago "L"	Following station
Western toward Midway	Orange Line	Ashland toward Loop (Library)
Track layout
Location

35th/Archer is an 'L' station on the CTA's Orange Line, located in the McKinley Park neighborhood. The station has a Park 'n' Ride lot with 70 spaces.

== Bus connections ==
CTA

- 35 31st/35th
- 39 Pershing
- 50 Damen
- 62 Archer (Owl Service)
