= Chicago Area Consolidation Hub =

General information
- Location: Hodgkins, Illinois
- Owner: UPS (United Parcel Service)

The Chicago Area Consolidation Hub (CACH) is a package sorting facility for United Parcel Service, located in the village of Hodgkins, Illinois.

CACH serves as a sorting facility for packages traveling in the United States and the world. Construction began in October 1991 at the site previously occupied by the GM Truck and Bus manufacturing plant, with the CACH facility opening on March 31, 1995. The facility has an area of 48.9 acres (198,000 m^{2}), and has a perimeter of 3.1 miles (5.0 km). It employs over 9,000 people available to work one of the four shifts: Sunrise, Day, Twilight, Night. CACH is the largest ground hub in UPS's worldwide network. Packages are only handled during loading and unloading; all sorting takes place through a system of conveyor belts and push paddles, utilizing high-speed cameras to read the destination from a smart label to sort a package to its trailer.

Unlike most UPS facilities, CACH does not have Package Centers which service package cars. The facility sorts approximately 1.6 million packages per day. During November and December, volume can exceed 3 million packages per day. UPS often uses CACH for new technology testing and validation prior to deployment in other facilities. Rubus unload devices have been used in limited quantities in CACH since 2013.

== Sections ==
=== Primary ===
Incoming trailers dock at the primary section of CACH, located in the center of the facility. There are 174 trailers in this section, separated into sections of three, called p-modules. Here, packages and bags of small packages are taken out of trailers and put on movable conveyor belts. Individual small packages are put in boxes and sent to the small sort section of the building. The packages are then read in a tunnel by 16 scanners and a camera, which signals a series of paddles to divert the packages onto other conveyor belts. When a box is scanned, the box is diverted to the small sort on the mezzanine, or second level of the building. Items that are not diverted go onto conveyor belts or the DA (Data Acquisition), which relabels packages. Open packages are unloaded from the primary section and put on one of two conveyor belts to be sorted.

=== Small package sort ===
There is a small package sort located in CACH. The work flow for small packages operates by unloading incoming packages and distributing them into other bags. Small packages are bagged at the east/west boundary and a series of conveyor belts, called bullfrogs on the mezzanine. All small packages are sent to a series of sorting machines. The small package sort contains 16 sorting machines called bullfrogs, including primary and secondary levels of sorting machines. Small packages are organized and sent to inductors to place small packages on a conveyor of machines. The small packages are read in a tunnel and diverted into their appropriate bags. Once bags are filled, they are placed on a conveyor belt to be sent to the outbound area to be loaded and the full bag is replaced by an empty bag.

=== Outbound packages ===
After sorting is complete, packages proceed to the loading trailers, which are located in the outbound area. There are 10 outbound areas at CACH, located on opposite ends of the facility. Each outbound area contains four docks with 21 bays each (except for outbounds 1 and 2, which contain six docks each), for a total of 1,058 loading bays. Outbounds 2 and 9 are used for extra packages. Packages coming out of the facility are sorted into secondaries, which divide packages to be sent to the front or back of the outbounds and then to the two docks on either side. From there, packages are read, scanned, and diverted down into trailers to be sent out. Some trailers sent out are then sent to the BNSF rail yard to be loaded onto a train.

== Secondary facility (Hammond, Indiana) ==
UPS's web tracking system used to list the CACH as "CACH, IL." With the Internet age, there was confusion as to what "CACH, IL" referred to by consumers. It has since switched to identifying the facility by its location name of Hodgkins.

A secondary CACH facility, known as the "West Point Pad", is located in Hammond, Indiana, south of the Cline Avenue exit on the Indiana Toll Road at Calumet Avenue, within an eastbound entrance ramp cloverleaf leading onto the ITR (41.643958°N 87.509272°W). The lot is used to switch double- and triple-tandem trailers to configurations acceptable to Illinois authorities and UPS CACH (the end portion of the ramp allows exit access back onto Calumet Avenue and west into Illinois on the ITR, via Cline Avenue or 141st Street). The lot is leased on an annual basis by UPS from the Indiana Toll Road Concession Company, the owners of the Indiana Toll Road. It shares the West Point name with the westernmost ITR toll plaza, also known as "West Point", 5.9 miles (9.5 km) north, but the Hammond CACH facility is sometimes erroneously marked as "Hopkins, Indiana".

== Transit access ==
CTA bus route 169 and four Pace bus routes, 390, 392, 395, and 890, serve this facility for weekday UPS shifts.

== See also ==
- Worldport
