= Hodgkins, Illinois =

- Village
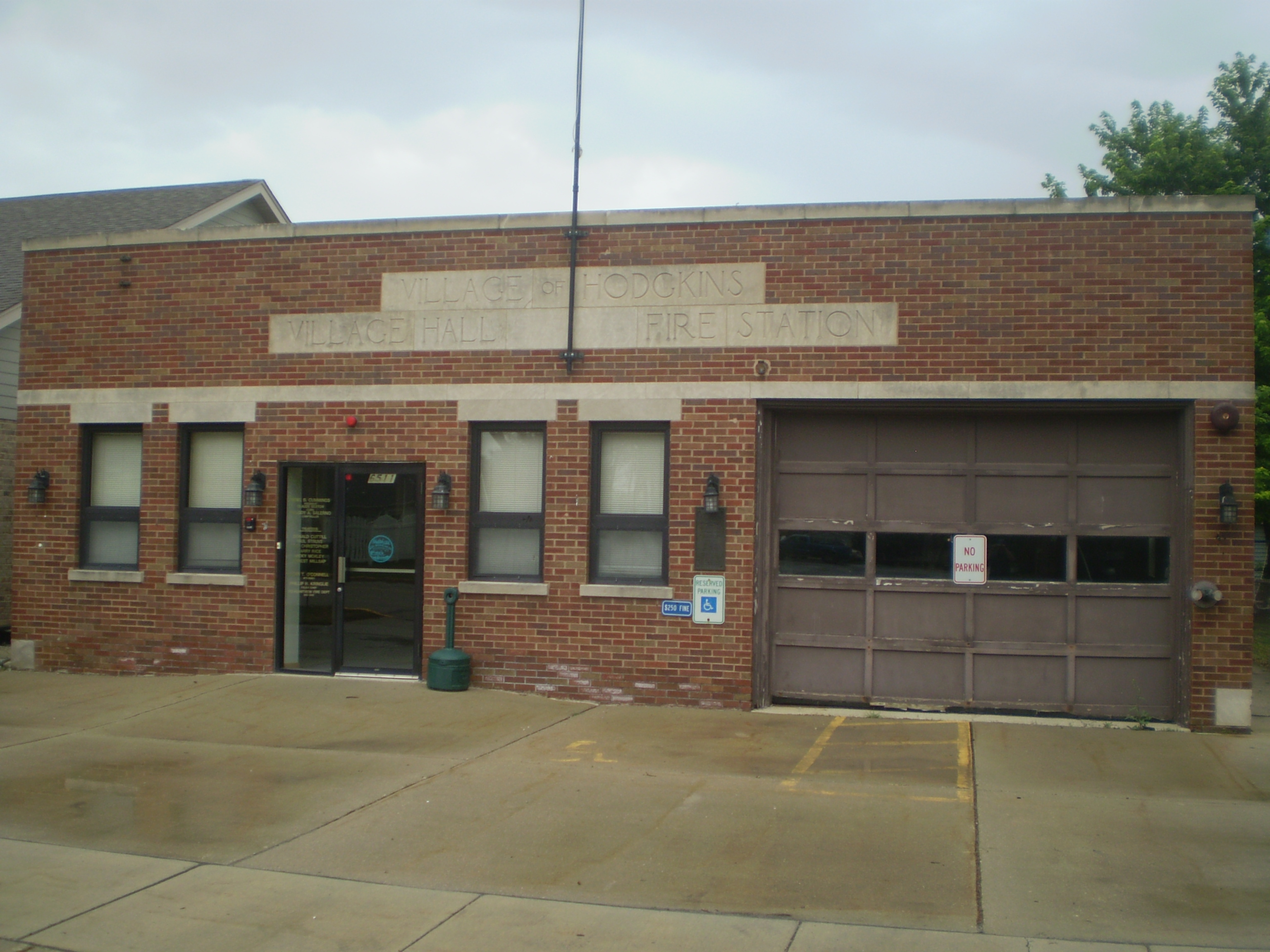
- The old Hodgkins Village Hall and Fire Station

- Seal
- Motto: "A progressive community based on family values"
- Location of Hodgkins in Cook County, Illinois

- Location within Greater Chicago Location within Illinois Location within the United States
- Coordinates: 41°45′51″N 87°51′34″W
- Country: United States
- State: Illinois
- County: Cook
- Named for: Jefferson Hodgkins

Government
  - Village President: Ernest Millsap

Area
  - Total: 2.76 sq mi (7.16 km^{2})
  - Land: 2.71 sq mi (7.02 km^{2})
  - Water: 0.054 sq mi (0.14 km^{2})

Population (2020)
  - Total: 1,500
  - Density: 553.1/sq mi (213.54/km^{2})
- Time zone: UTC-6 (CST)
  - Summer (DST): UTC-5 (CDT)
- ZIP Code(s): 60525
- Area code: 708
- FIPS code: 17-35385
- Wikimedia Commons: Hodgkins, Illinois
- Website: www.villageofhodgkins.org

Hodgkins is a village in Cook County, Illinois, United States, and is an industrial suburb of Chicago. The population was 1,500 at the 2020 census, down from 1,897 at the 2010 census.

A United Parcel Service facility, known as CACH, is located in Hodgkins at 1 UPS Way. CACH employs over 9,000 people and is the "largest package sorting center in the world".

== History ==
The first European visitors to present-day Hodgkins, explorers Jacques Marquette and Louis Joliet, paddled down the Des Plaines River in 1673, passing through the area, making their camp in present-day Summit. Settlement in the area, however, was somewhat stagnant until the early 19th century. It was at this time, around 1836, that Irish and Italian immigrants came to the area to work on the Illinois and Michigan Canal. The construction and eventual operation of the canal was responsible for the formation of many villages presently located along its banks, including Hodgkins.

The village of Hodgkins was originally known as Gary, a name locals claim was derived from "Garibaldi", in recognition of the large number of Italian laborers working in an area grain mill. After several name changes, the Village of Hodgkins was incorporated in 1896. Jefferson Hodgkins, the president of the Kimball and Cobb Stone company, which was also the first business to locate in the village, was the man for whom Hodgkins was named. Modesto Lenzi, the somewhat dubious "King of Gary", became the village's first president that same year.

=== Patrick Crowley murder ===
Modesto Lenzi was unsuccessful in his 1909 reelection bid. Lenzi was defeated by L. E. Thatcher in an election that contemporary newspaper accounts called "a political feud between the prohibition and liquor interests". The election campaign raged hotly for several months, culminating in Lenzi's ouster. On the night of June 14, 1909, the crowd gathered in Hodgkins during and after the election became unruly. Village marshal Patrick Crowley, in an attempt to restore order, placed Modesto Lenzi, who was allegedly inciting the crowd, under arrest for disturbing the peace. As Crowley was bringing Lenzi to the jail: "A shot was fired in to his breast by some person in a crowd of alleged Lenzi sympathizers gathered about."

The Fort Wayne News reported the following on June 14, 1909:

Modesto Lenzi, an Italian, was defeated for re-election as president of the village, after a hot anti-liquor fight at the last election...the man started peacefully to the village lock-up, but when half way there suddenly offered resistance. As Crowley as remonstrating with him, an unknown man suddenly appeared, drew a revolver and shot Crowley dead. In the excitement the slayer fled.

On June 22, 1909, a grand jury concluded:

The said Patrick Crowley now lying dead...in said village of LaGrange...came to his death...from shock and hemorrhage due to a bullet wound in the right breast, said bullet fired from a revolver held in the hand of one Harry Lenzi, on the road at Gary [Hodgkins], Ill. on June 13, 1909. And from the evidence presented, we the jury recommend that Harry Lenzi, as principal and now at large, be apprehended, and that Modesto Lenzi and John May, as accessories before the fact, be held to the Grand Jury on the charge of murder, until released by due process of law. We the jury further believe that if one Frank Meno, had not interfered, the above named Harry Lenzi would now be in custody. We therefore recommend that Frank Meno be apprehended and held as an accessory after the fact.

On December 23, 1909, it was reported by the Logansport Pharos newspaper that the charges of murder against Modesto Lenzi and John May had been dropped. The paper reported that Assistant State's Attorney Benedict J. Short told Judge Kersten's court that the state had no evidence against the defendants.

Marshall Crowley was buried at Mount Olivet Cemetery in Chicago.

=== 2023 EF-1 Tornado ===
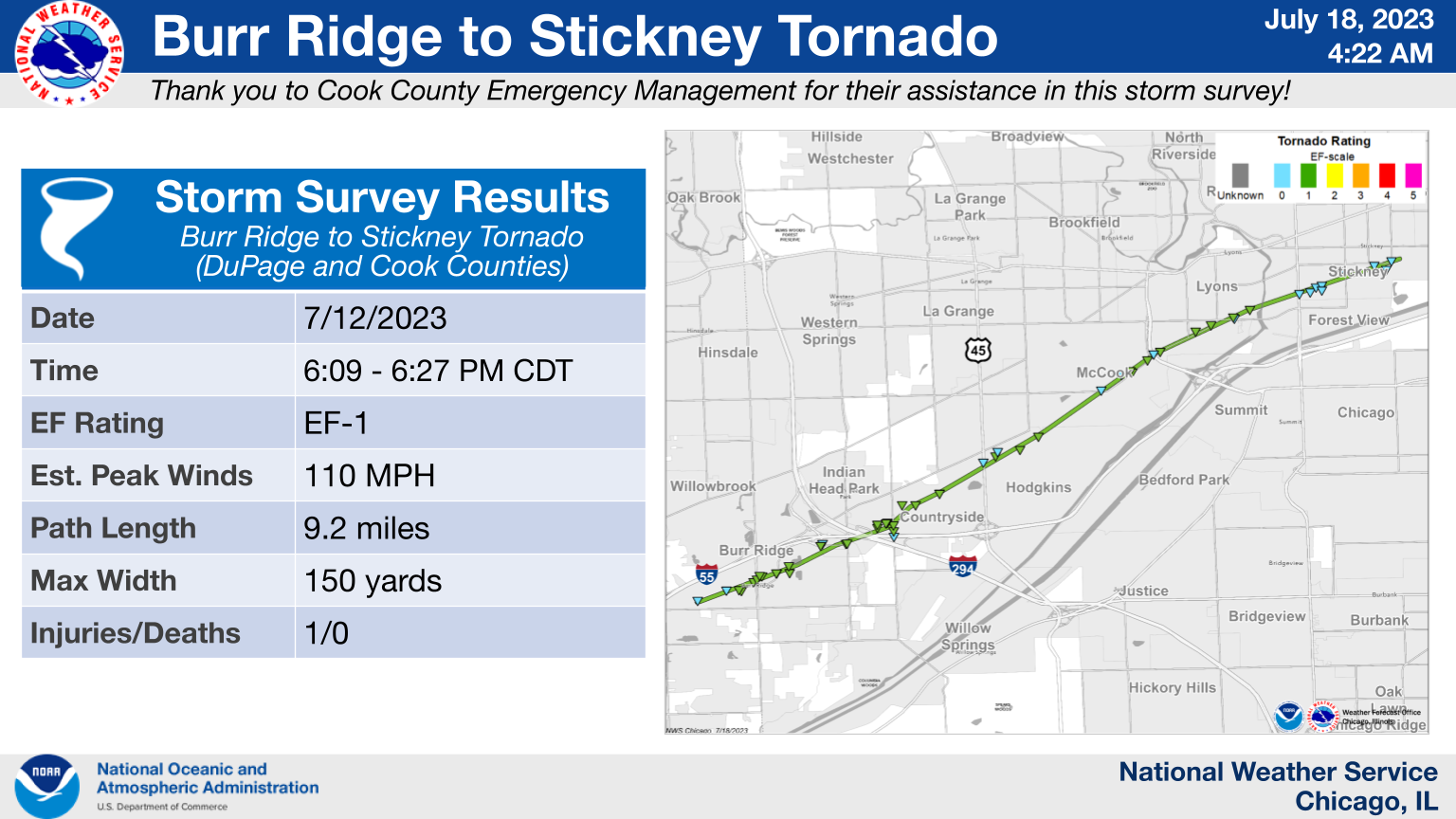
Tornado track for EF-1 tornado that passed through Hodgkins, IL on July 12, 2023.

On July 12, 2023, at approximately 6:09pm, a tornado (eventually rated as an EF-1) touched down near the Mars Ice Cream factory in Burr Ridge, IL. The tornado took a northeasterly track, traveling alongside U.S Route 66, into Countryside, Hodgkins, McCook, and Lyons, until finally dissipating in Stickney at 6:27pm. It caused tree damage in the Theodore Stone Forest Preserve. Structures along the path of the storm that were affected included Salerno's Restaurant, Ettleson Cadillac, The Quarry Shopping Mall (including Walmart, Kohl's, and Ross), Republic Bank, Menards, and Target. As it crossed East Avenue, it damaged D & S Truck Sales, and structures on Lenzi Avenue before spinning into the Vulcan Quarry. It eventually headed East, into neighboring McCook.

=== John Pisano Cold Case ===
On September 6, 2025, a diving group known as Chaos Divers pulled a 1998 Lincoln Town Car from a retention pond at Joliet Rd & East Ave. Upon investigation, human remains were found in the vehicle and linked to a 2001 missing person's case. The car had been submerged in about 5 feet of water for over two decades.

On May 26, 2026, the Cook County Medical Examiner's Office identified the remains as John Joseph Pisano Jr., a 39-year-old Army veteran who vanished in 2001. According to his obituary, he "faced lifelong struggles with mental illness, a battle he carried quietly for many years."

== Geography ==
Hodgkins is located at 41°45′51″N 87°51′34″W (41.764181, −87.859384).

According to the 2021 census gazetteer files, Hodgkins has a total area of 2.77 square miles (7.17 km^{2}), of which 2.71 square miles (7.02 km^{2}) (or 98.05%) is land and 0.05 square miles (0.13 km^{2}) (or 1.95%) is water.

Neighboring communities are Willow Springs, Justice, Bedford Park, McCook, and Countryside.

== Demographics ==
Historical population
Census	Pop.	Note	%±
1900	195		—
1910	480		146.2%
1920	266		−44.6%
1930	302		13.5%
1940	331		9.6%
1950	536		61.9%
1960	1,126		110.1%
1970	2,270		101.6%
1980	2,005		−11.7%
1990	1,963		−2.1%
2000	2,134		8.7%
2010	1,897		−11.1%
2020	1,500		−20.9%
U.S. Decennial Census

=== Racial and ethnic composition ===
Hodgkins village, Illinois – Racial and ethnic composition Note: the US Census treats Hispanic/Latino as an ethnic category. This table excludes Latinos from the racial categories and assigns them to a separate category. Hispanics/Latinos may be of any race.
Race / Ethnicity (NH = Non-Hispanic)	Pop 2000	Pop 2010	Pop 2020	% 2000	% 2010	% 2020
White alone (NH)	1,187	997	753	55.62%	52.56%	50.20%
Black or African American alone (NH)	0	6	17	0.00%	0.32%	1.13%
Native American or Alaska Native alone (NH)	2	0	3	0.09%	0.00%	0.20%
Asian alone (NH)	1	2	21	0.05%	0.11%	1.40%
Pacific Islander alone (NH)	0	0	0	0.00%	0.00%	0.00%
Other race alone (NH)	0	0	0	0.00%	0.00%	0.00%
Mixed race or Multiracial (NH)	11	4	44	0.52%	0.21%	2.93%
Hispanic or Latino (any race)	933	888	662	43.72%	46.81%	44.13%
Total	2,134	1,897	1,500	100.00%	100.00%	100.00%

=== 2020 census ===
As of the 2020 census, Hodgkins had a population of 1,500, with 606 households and 333 families. The median age was 44.9 years. 20.9% of residents were under the age of 18 and 22.1% were 65 years of age or older. For every 100 females, there were 96.1 males, and for every 100 females age 18 and over, there were 98.2 males.

100.0% of residents lived in urban areas, while 0.0% lived in rural areas.

Of the 606 households, 27.4% had children under the age of 18 living with them. Of all households, 39.1% were married-couple households, 25.7% were households with a male householder and no spouse or partner present, and 30.5% were households with a female householder and no spouse or partner present. About 35.8% of all households were made up of individuals, and 22.7% had someone living alone who was 65 years of age or older.

There were 642 housing units, of which 5.6% were vacant. The homeowner vacancy rate was 0.8% and the rental vacancy rate was 8.1%. The population density was 542.30 inhabitants per square mile (209.38/km^{2}), and housing density was 232.10 per square mile (89.61/km^{2}).

=== Income and poverty ===
The median income for a household in the village was $54,792, and the median income for a family was $53,194. Males had a median income of $40,592 versus $26,250 for females. The per capita income for the village was $24,597. About 9.9% of families and 14.6% of the population were below the poverty line, including 20.0% of those under age 18 and 13.3% of those age 65 or over.

== Government ==
Hodgkins is governed by an elected president and six trustees. The Village President, Village Clerk, and three Trustees are elected every four years. The other group of three Trustees are also elected for four-year terms, but this election is staggered and takes place two years after the first group. The Village Treasurer, the Village Chief of Police, and the Village Superintendent of Public Works are appointed. Hodgkins is in Illinois's 3rd congressional district.

== McCook-Hodgkins Enterprise Zone ==
In the 1950s and 1960s, Hodgkins began to attract motor freight terminals. The village's location relative to expressways and the availability of high, flat, and dry land made it a natural distribution and transfer point between Chicago and the rest of the nation. Hodgkins grew substantially during these two decades; however, by the late 1970s, the motor freight industry began to decline.

In 1985, Hodgkins joined with the village of McCook to create the McCook-Hodgkins Enterprise Zone. The next year saw the creation of a Tax Increment Finance (TIF) District within the Enterprise Zone. Both of these tools allowed the village to offer incentives to new businesses desiring to locate there. As a result of these programs, commercial business began to replace motor freight as Hodgkins' mechanism of growth. Developers built a major local shopping center, The Quarry Mall, on land vacated by the declining motor freight companies in 1992. Several auto dealerships, restaurants, a movie theater and an off-track betting establishment were also attracted to the development.

== Jefferson Hodgkins ==
The village's name comes from a local landowner and businessman, Jefferson Hodgkins, and is unrelated to the discoverer of Hodgkin's lymphoma, Thomas Hodgkin.

It is unclear exactly how Hodgkins' name came to replace Gary as the village's moniker. Throughout its history, Hodgkins has been known by several different names. In the years before settlers began to arrive, the Potawatomi people lived in the area near the Des Plaines River. From 1836 transient workers were brought to the area to work on the I&M Canal; however, it was not until 1860, when the United States government deeded property to a local settler, Hurls Polk, that the name "Polk" was given to the area. When the Santa Fe Depot was built in 1887, the name of the stop was "Novak". By 1890, the Atchison, Topeka and Santa Fe Railroad listed the stop in present-day Hodgkins as "Gary". this designation would stick until July 1, 1896, when the village of Hodgkins was incorporated.

Quarrying continues today at the Vulcan Materials Company McCook Quarry, with a total of 650 acres (260 ha) in Hodgkins and McCook.

== Immanuel Lutheran Church ==
Thoughts of organizing a Lutheran congregation at Hodgkins were entertained as far back as the 1880s. At that time there were several Lutheran families living in what would later be the village of Hodgkins who were members of the Lutheran churches of La Grange (St. John) and Willow Springs (Trinity). A local merchant named John Witsan organized a Sunday school in Hodgkins about this same time. The development of the Sunday school amplified, for the Lutheran families, the inconvenience of sending their children to the Lutheran day schools and Sunday schools in La Grange and Willow Springs, and thoughts of a stand-alone congregation in Hodgkins began to materialize. Two representatives from the Lutheran churches in La Grange and Willow Springs, Reinhardt Leu and Henry Bloedorn, approached Reverend Alex Ullrich of LaGrange with the proposition of establishing a Lutheran congregation in Hodgkins.

== Fire protection ==
The district maintains professional, full-time firefighting crews at all three stations including paramedics for its ambulances. The Pleasantview Fire Protection District is also an integral member of a large Mutual Aid Association of fire fighters, paramedics, and rescue workers throughout the area.

== Hodgkins today ==
The village of Hodgkins maintains its own police department, public works department, and water department, which purchases Lake Michigan water from McCook. Hodgkins Elementary School is part of La Grange School District 105. High school students attend Lyons Township High School. The Hodgkins Park District offers a large community center and schedules a myriad of activities all year long. The Hodgkins Public Library is a full-service facility within the Reaching Across Illinois Library System. The Village of Hodgkins currently employs 25 full- and part-time employees.

== Transportation ==
Pace provides bus service on multiple routes connecting Hodgkins to destinations across the region.

Hodgkins is located along the BNSF Railway line between Chicago and Los Angeles; it was served by commuter trains until 1903.
