= Western station (CTA Orange Line) =

Chicago "L" station

Western 2400W 4900S
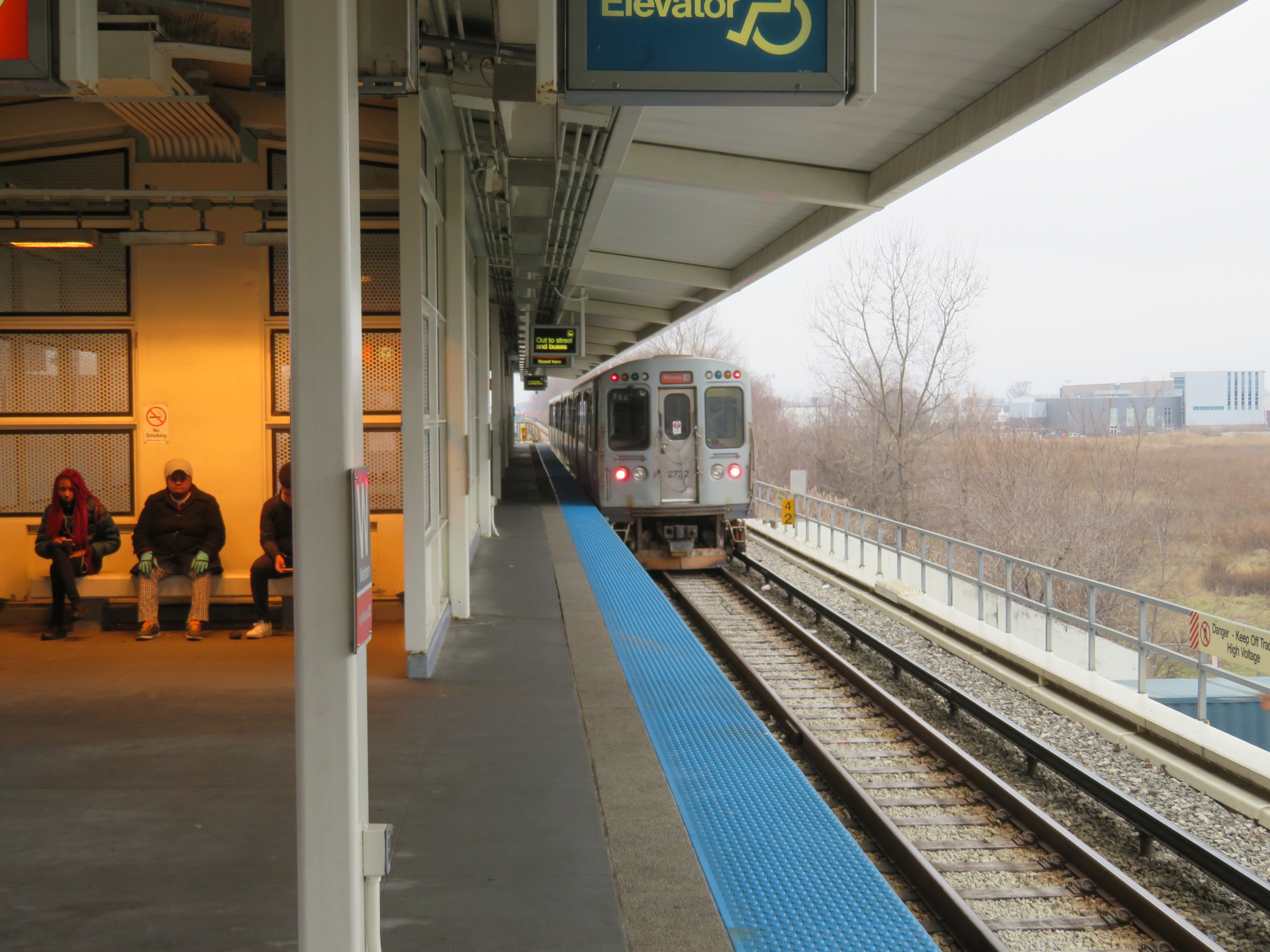
- Midway-bound train leaving Western station in December 2018

General information
- Location: 4901 South Western Avenue; Chicago, Illinois 60632
- Coordinates: 41.804546°N 87.684019°W
- Owner: Chicago Transit Authority
- Line: Midway Branch
- Platforms: 1 island platform
- Tracks: 2

Construction
- Structure type: Embankment
- Parking: 200 spaces
- Cycle facilities: Yes
- Accessible: Yes

History
- Opened: October 31, 1993; 32 years ago (formal opening); November 3, 1993; 32 years ago (full service)

Passengers
- 2025: 761,015 ▲3%

Services
Preceding station	Chicago "L"	Following station
Kedzie toward Midway	Orange Line	35th/Archer toward Loop (Library)
Former services
Preceding station	Grand Trunk Western Railroad	Following station
Morrell Park toward Valparaiso	Suburban Service (Chicago)	Ashland Avenue toward Chicago
Track layout
Location

Western is a station on the Chicago Transit Authority's 'L' system, serving the Orange Line. It is located between the neighborhoods of Brighton Park and Gage Park. The Orange Line crosses Western Avenue three times, however the station is located at its southernmost crossing at 49th Street.

== Bus connections ==
CTA

- 48 South Damen (weekday rush hours only)
- 49 Western (Owl Service)
- X49 Western Express (weekday rush hours only)
- 94 California
