= Midway station (CTA) =

Chicago "L" station

Midway 5900S 4600W
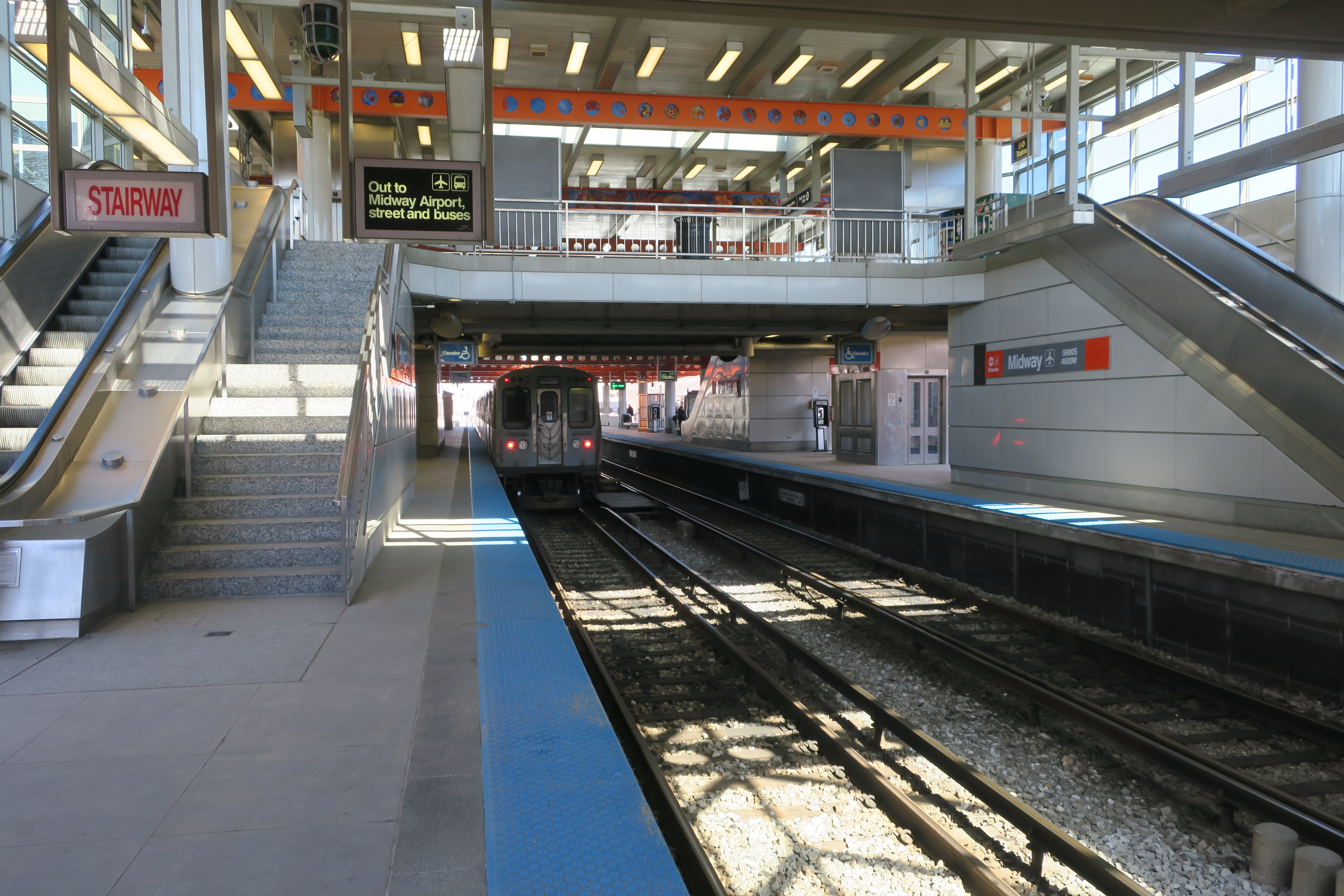

General information
- Location: 4612 West 59th Street; Chicago, Illinois 60629
- Coordinates: 41.78661°N 87.737875°W
- Owner: Chicago Transit Authority
- Line: Midway Branch
- Platforms: 1 island platform 1 side platform
- Tracks: 3
- Connections: CTA Buses; Pace Buses; River Valley Metro

Construction
- Structure type: At-grade
- Parking: 299 spaces
- Cycle facilities: Yes
- Accessible: Yes

History
- Opened: October 31, 1993; 32 years ago (formal opening); November 3, 1993; 32 years ago (full service)

Passengers
- 2025: 1,618,226 ▲1.2%

Services
Preceding station	Chicago "L"	Following station
Terminus	Orange Line	Pulaski toward Loop (Library)
Track layout
Location

Midway is an 'L' station on the CTA's Orange Line. It is the southwestern terminus of the Orange Line and serves Midway International Airport in Chicago, the city's second-largest airport. The turnstiles at the station's entrance are somewhat wider than most to accommodate airport passengers and their luggage. The station, along with the rest of the Orange Line, opened on October 31, 1993 after a long wait by Chicago's southwest side for 'L' access. It is also the closest station to SeatGeek Stadium, former home of the Chicago Fire, which is approximately 4 miles away. Although in the Garfield Ridge community area, the station serves many residents in the West Elsdon and West Lawn neighborhoods. Unlike O'Hare, passengers using Midway station do not pay an airport surcharge in addition to the standard "L" fare. This is because Midway serves purposes beyond airport access, such as being an important transportation hub for the southwest suburbs.

== History ==
Midway destination sign

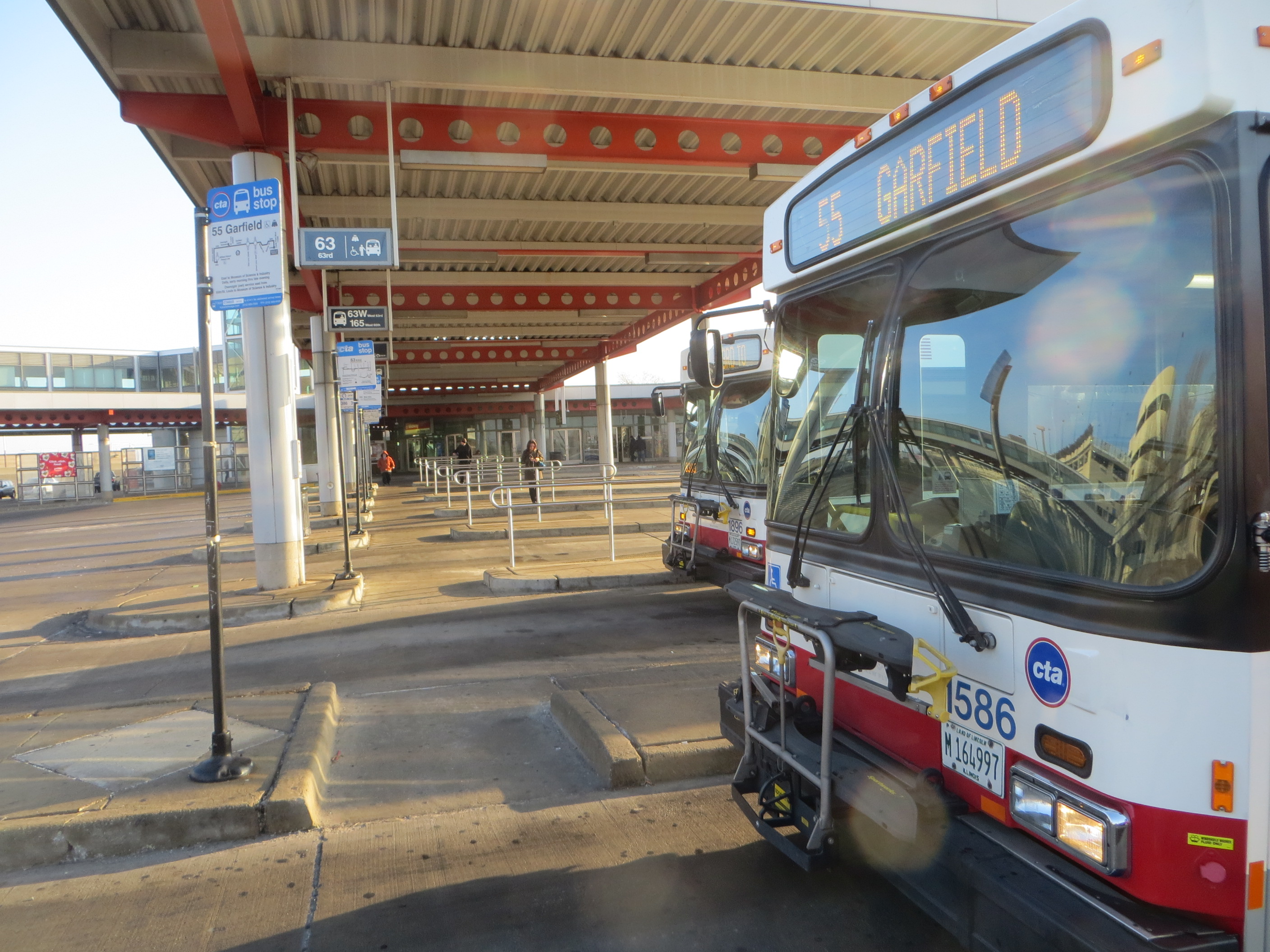

Prior to 1993, the southwest side was served only by the Douglas Park Branch of the West-Northwest Line. As the city expanded, this service became insufficient. As early as the 1940s, when the State Street and Milwaukee-Dearborn Subways were being constructed, the city planned to expand the 'L' to Midway Airport. However, this plan was not approved.

On January 22, 1990, there was a groundbreaking ceremony held at the future site of Midway station. Many people attended, including Mayor Daley; Bernard Ford, the CTA Acting Executive Director; and David Williams, the Chicago public works commissioner. In 1993, the CTA finished building the new Orange Line. It cost $500 million despite the use of abandoned railroad right-of-ways. Midway station includes a three-track terminal, a rail yard, a car maintenance facility, an island and side platform, elevators leading to the sidewalk, and escalators and stairs connecting to the moving walkway heading to the airport.

When the garage was built on the east side of Cicero, it bisected the walkway from the station to the airport. In 2002, the Department of Aviation built a walkway through the garage.

== Bus connections ==
CTA

- 47 47th
- 54B South Cicero
- 55 Garfield
- 55A 55th/Austin (weekday rush hours only)
- 55N 55th/Narragansett (Monday–Saturday only)
- 59 59th/61st (Monday–Saturday only)
- 62H Archer/Harlem (Monday–Saturday only)
- N62 Archer (Owl Service – overnight only)
- 63 63rd (Owl Service)
- 63W West 63rd
- 165 West 65th (weekday rush hours only)

Pace

- 315 Austin Boulevard - Midway
- 379 Midway/Orland Park
- 383 South Cicero
- 384 Narragansett/Ridgeland
- 385 87th/111th/127th (weekdays only)
- 386 South Harlem
- 387 SeatGeek Stadium Direct (game days & events only)
- 390 Midway CTA/UPS Hodgkins (weekday UPS shifts only)

River Valley Metro

- Midway Commuter Shuttle
