= Dempster Street station (Chicago and North Western Railway) =

Railroad station in Evanston, Illinois, US

Dempster Street
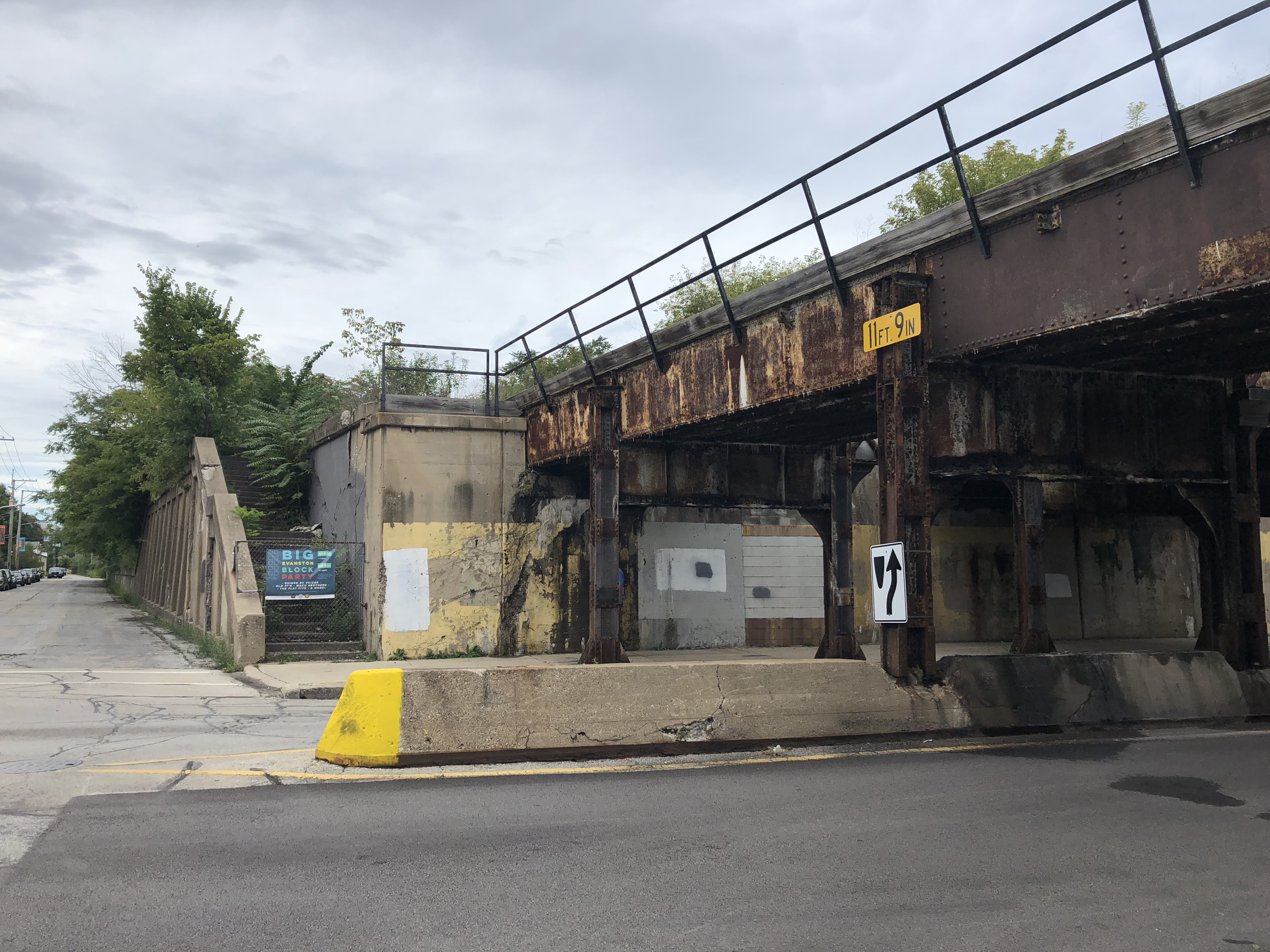
- Northern stairway which led to the northbound platform (fenced off to prevent access to track level)

General information
- Location: Dempster Street and Sherman Avenue; Evanston, Illinois 60202
- Coordinates: 42.0413°N 87.6819°W
- Line: Kenosha Subdivision
- Platforms: 2 side platforms
- Tracks: 3

History
- Closed: December 1, 1958

Former services
Preceding station	Chicago and North Western Railway	Following station
Evanston toward Milwaukee	Milwaukee Division	Main Street toward Chicago
Location

Dempster Street was a commuter railroad station on the Chicago and North Western Railway's Milwaukee Division, now the Union Pacific North Line. The station was located at Dempster Street and Sherman Avenue, in Evanston, Illinois. It was adjacent the CTA Purple Line's Dempster station.

The station consisted of a pair of side platforms on the outside of the line's three tracks. Consistent with the C&NW's left-hand running, the eastern track and platform served southbound trains (to Chicago) while the western track and platform served northbound trains (to Milwaukee). The center track was a through track and did not serve the station. The entire facility was elevated above ground level on a solid fill embankment. Access to the platforms was available by a number of stairways on both sides of the crossing of Dempster.

By the 1950s, Chicago and North Western management began to reassess its commuter service and determined that the railroad would be more economical and efficient by closing stations in and near Chicago and focusing on suburban and long-haul traffic while the Chicago Transit Authority could carry passengers in Chicago and its neighboring suburbs. To this end, the company went before the Illinois Commerce Commission in June 1958, requesting permission to abandon more than twenty stops, alter train schedules, revise its ticketing structure, and raise fares on monthly tickets. The ICC returned its verdict on November 14, ruling in favor of granting the majority of the Chicago and North Western's requests, which included the closure of the Dempster Street station. The fare increase and service alterations went into effect on December 1, 1958, and Dempster Street was abandoned along with twenty other stations either in or near Chicago on the Milwaukee, Geneva, and Wisconsin Divisions.
