= Calvary station =

Calvary station could refer to:

- Calvary station (Chicago and North Western Railway), a former commuter rail station in Evanston, Illinois
- Calvary station (CRT), a former rapid transit station in Evanston, Illinois
