= Main station (CTA) =

Chicago "L" station

Main 900N 732W
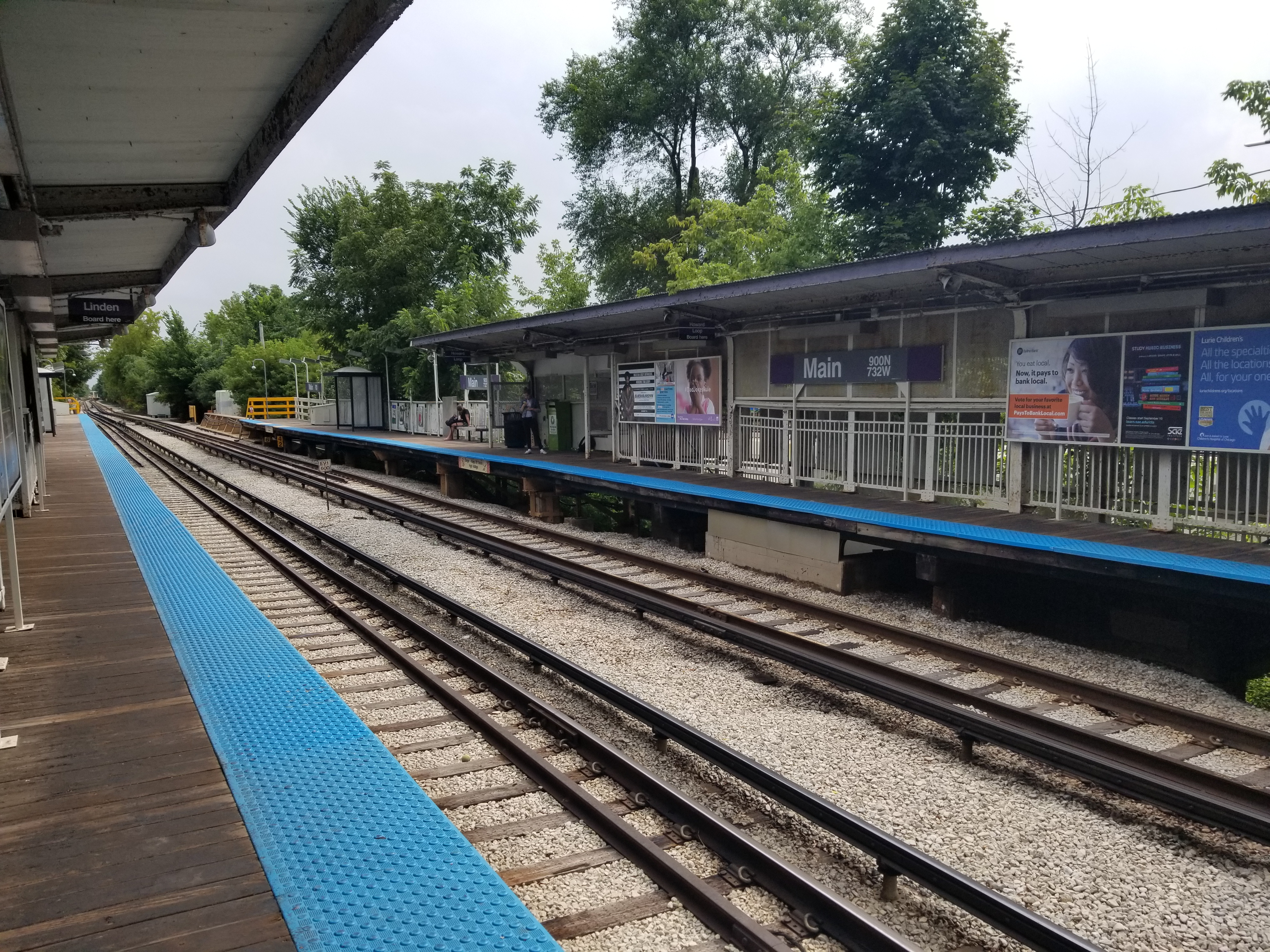

General information
- Location: 836 Chicago Avenue; Evanston, Illinois 60202
- Coordinates: 42.03333°N 87.67925°W
- Owner: Chicago Transit Authority
- Line: Evanston Branch
- Platforms: 2 side platforms
- Tracks: 2
- Connections: at Main Street/Evanston; CTA and Pace buses

Construction
- Structure type: Elevated
- Accessible: No

History
- Opened: May 16, 1908; 118 years ago
- Rebuilt: 1909; 117 years ago

Passengers
- 2025: 214,987 ▲12.2%

Services
Preceding station	Chicago "L"	Following station
Dempster toward Linden	Purple Line	South Boulevard toward Howard or Loop (Clark/Lake)
Former services
Preceding station	Milwaukee Road	Following station
Dempster Street toward Llewellyn Park	Chicago – Evanston	Calvary toward Chicago
Preceding station	Chicago "L"	Following station
Dempster toward Linden	Evanston Line	Calvary Closed 1931 toward Howard
Track layout
Location

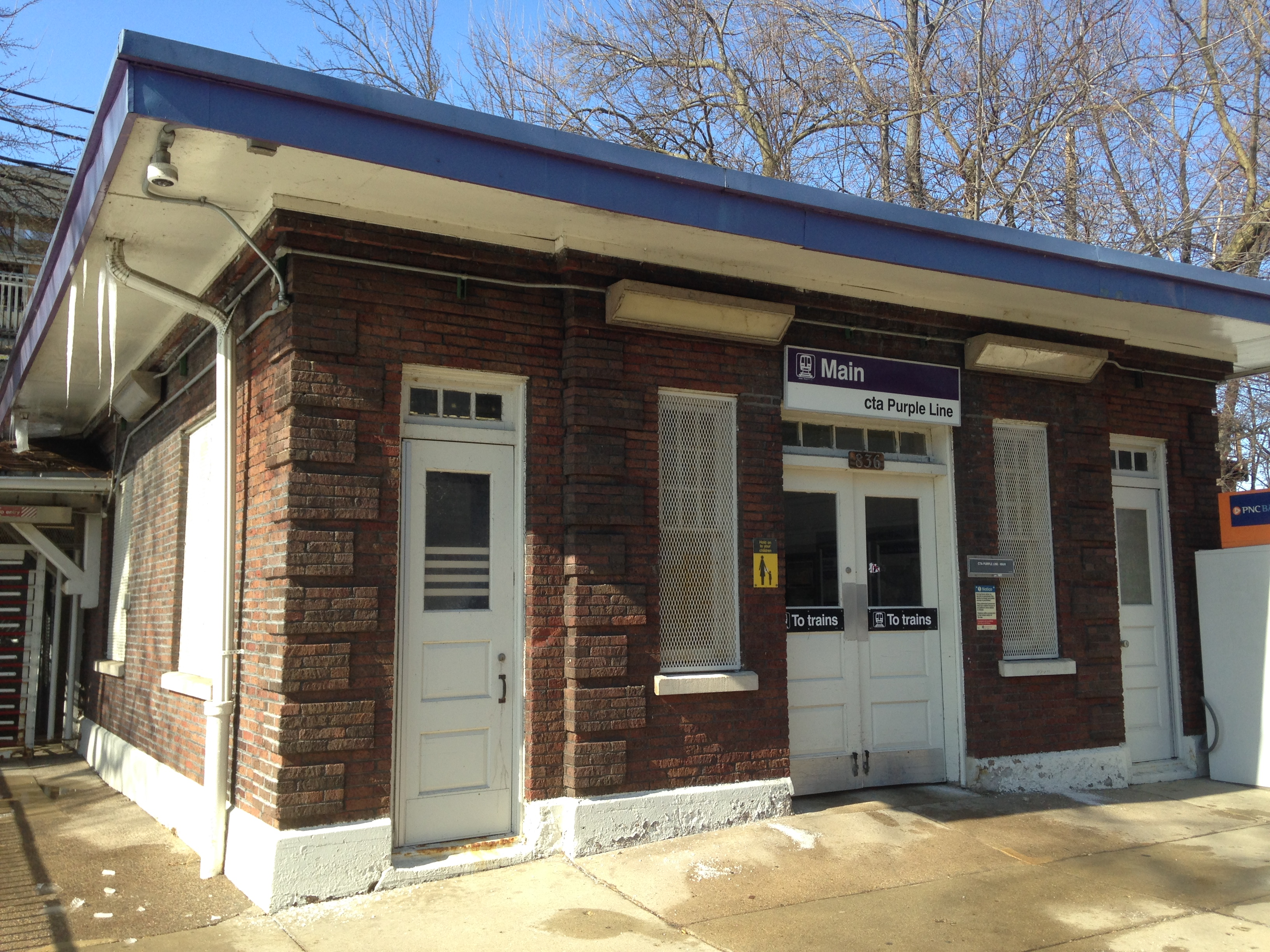
Main Street station house in 2020

Main is an 'L' station on the CTA's Purple Line at 836 Chicago Avenue in Evanston, Illinois (directional coordinates 900 north, 732 west). It is near the Main Street station of Metra's Union Pacific North Line.

The current station has been in place since 1908, with only little renovation to the station since then, most notably a 90-foot extension of the platform in 1997 so that a motorman in the front car could see all doors stopped at the station (the platform had curved at one end previously). Main is one of the stations on the CTA's 2004-2008 Capital Improvement Plan.

== Bus and rail connections ==
CTA

- 206 Evanston Circulator (school days only)

Pace

- 213 Green Bay Road (Monday–Saturday only)

Metra

- Union Pacific North (at Main Street/Evanston)
