= Free School of Evanston =

Former alternative school in Evanston, IL, USA

The Free School of Evanston was an alternative school that existed in Evanston, Illinois, United States from 1971 to 1976, for five school years.

== Influences ==
The Free School was influenced by Summerhill School. At meetings, parents, students, and teachers were all equal, each having one vote. Tuition was based on a sliding scale percentage of parents' income. The school did not pursue educational accreditation.

== Location ==
The school rented space at:

| School years | Space | Building | Address | Coordinates |
|---|---|---|---|---|
| 1971-72 | basement | Unitarian Church of Evanston | 1330 Ridge Avenue, Evanston, Illinois | 42.04262°N 87.68912°W |
| 1972-76 | many rooms | Wheadon United Methodist Church | 2214 Ridge Avenue, Evanston, Illinois | 42.05817°N 87.68648°W |

== Student body ==
The school enrolled more than 100 students, aged 5–16, divided into lower, middle, and upper age groups. Most were from the Chicago suburbs, with a few from Chicago's inner city neighborhoods.

== Principals ==
| School year(s) | Principal |
|---|---|
| 1971-72 | ? |
| 1972-74 | Nelson Armour |
| 1974-75 | ? |
| 1975-76 | ? |

== See also ==
- Anarchistic free school
- Alternative education
- Student voice
