= Main Street/Evanston station =

Commuter rail station in Evanston, Illinois

Coordinates: 42.033412°N 87.680001°W

Main Street Evanston

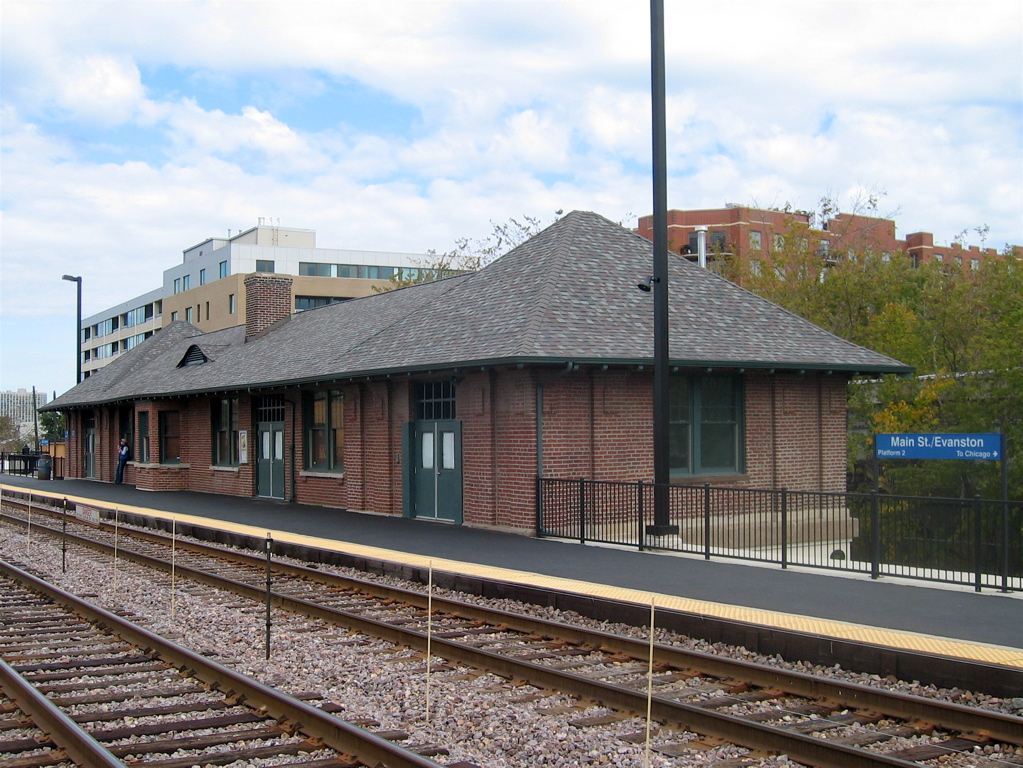

General information
- Location: 600 Main Street; Evanston, Illinois 60202
- Owner: Union Pacific
- Platforms: 2 side platforms
- Tracks: 2
- Connections: Purple at Main; CTA Buses

Construction
- Parking: Yes
- Accessible: Yes

Other information
- Fare zone: 2

History
- Opened: 1910

Passengers
- 2018: 1,130 (average weekday) ▼0.3%
- Rank: 41 out of 236

Services
Preceding station	Metra	Following station
Davis Street/Evanston toward Kenosha	Union Pacific North	Rogers Park toward Ogilvie TC
Former services
Preceding station	Chicago and North Western Railway	Following station
Dempster Street toward Milwaukee	Milwaukee Division	Calvary toward Chicago
Track layout
Location

Main Street/Evanston is the southernmost of the three commuter railroad stations in Evanston, Illinois. It is served by Metra's Union Pacific North Line trains, which go south to Ogilvie Transportation Center in Chicago and as far north as Kenosha, Wisconsin. Travel time to Ogilvie is typically 23 minutes, but can be as high as 26 minutes during rush hour. In Metra's zone-based fare system, the station is in zone 2. As of 2018, Main Street is the 41st busiest of Metra's 236 non-downtown stations, with an average of 1,130 weekday boardings. The station does not contain a ticket agent booth; passengers must purchase their tickets on board the train or at one of the vending machines located on the inbound platform.

As of September 20, 2025, Main Street is served by 59 trains (30 inbound, 29 outbound) on weekdays, and by all 30 trains (15 in each direction) on weekends and holidays. During the summer concert season, an extra weekend train to Ravinia Park station also stops here.

The station is located on Main Street between Chicago Avenue and Custer Avenue, with CTA's Main station immediately to the east. It is one of two Metra stations in Evanston to provide direct transfers to the CTA rail system, the other being Davis Street/Evanston station. The neighboring area contains multi-story apartment buildings and the Main Street Station Shopping District.

Main Street station also houses a cultural center known as Evanston Arts Depot, which houses the offices of the Custer's Last Stand festival and has performance space for Piccolo Theatre.

== Bus and rail connections ==
CTA Purple Line

- Main

CTA Buses

- 206 Evanston Circulator (school days only)

Pace

- 213 Green Bay Road (Monday–Saturday only)
