= Davis station (CTA) =

Chicago "L" station

Davis 1600N 800W
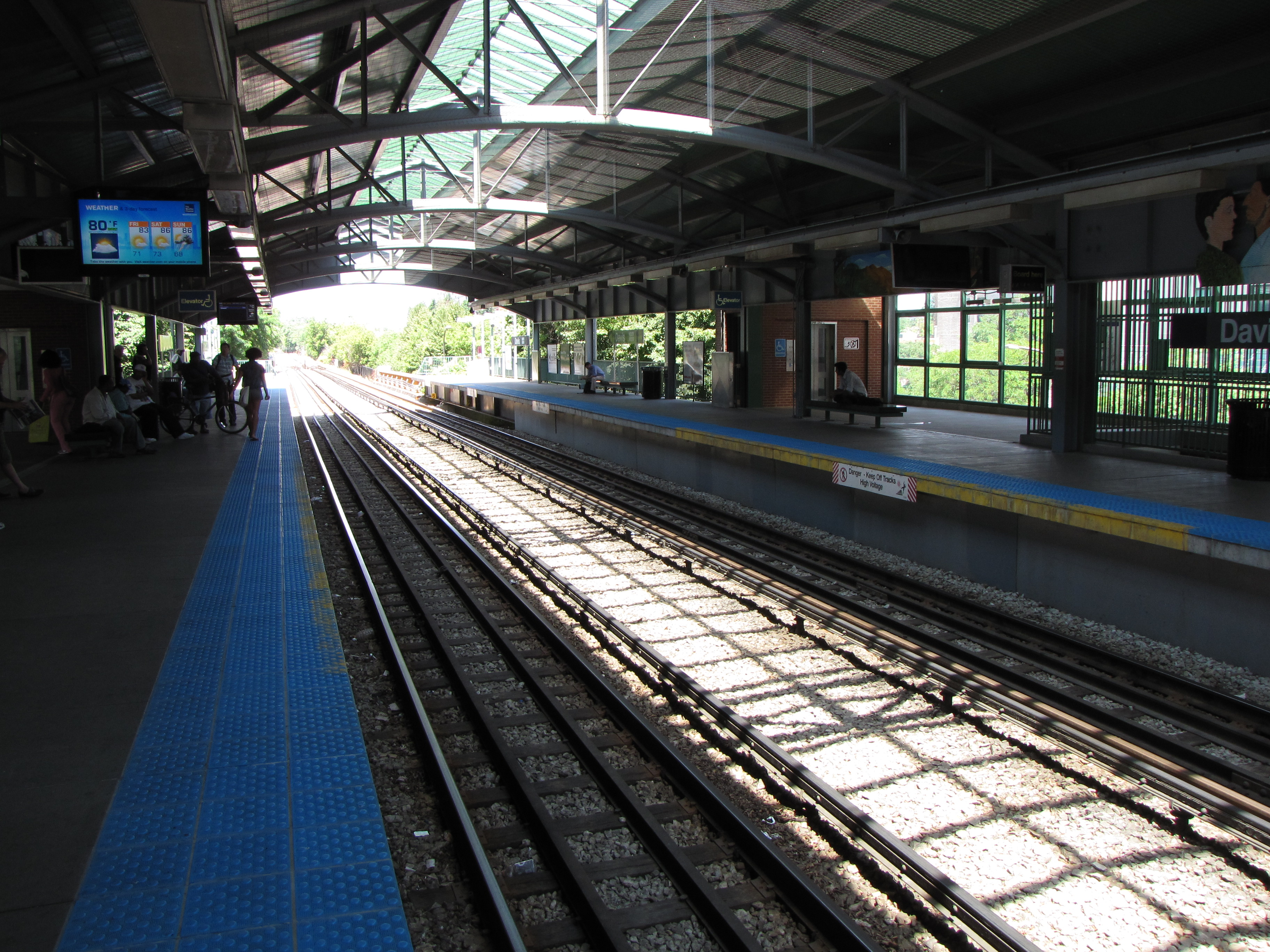

General information
- Location: 1612 Benson Avenue; Evanston, Illinois 60201
- Coordinates: 42.04771°N 87.68363°W
- Owner: Chicago Transit Authority
- Line: Evanston Branch
- Platforms: 2 side platforms
- Tracks: 2
- Connections: at Davis Street/Evanston; Pace and CTA Buses

Construction
- Structure type: Elevated
- Cycle facilities: Yes
- Accessible: Yes

History
- Opened: May 16, 1908; 118 years ago
- Rebuilt: 1908–1910; 116 years ago, 1978–1979; 47 years ago, 1992–1994; 32 years ago

Passengers
- 2025: 625,696 ▲12.5%

Services
Preceding station	Chicago "L"	Following station
Foster toward Linden	Purple Line	Dempster toward Howard or Loop (Clark/Lake)
Preceding station	Pace Pulse	Following station
Dodge toward O'Hare MMF	Dempster Line	Terminus
Former services
Preceding station	Milwaukee Road	Following station
Noyes Street toward Llewellyn Park	Chicago – Evanston	Dempster toward Chicago
Track layout
Location

Davis is a station on the Chicago Transit Authority's 'L' system, on the Purple Line in Evanston, Illinois. It is located at 1612 Benson Avenue (directional coordinates 1600 north, 800 west), in the middle of downtown Evanston, and next to the Davis Street stop of Metra's Union Pacific North Line. The station is also a terminus for one CTA and two Pace bus routes. The station is referred to as the Davis Transit Center by Pace.

== History ==
=== Structure ===
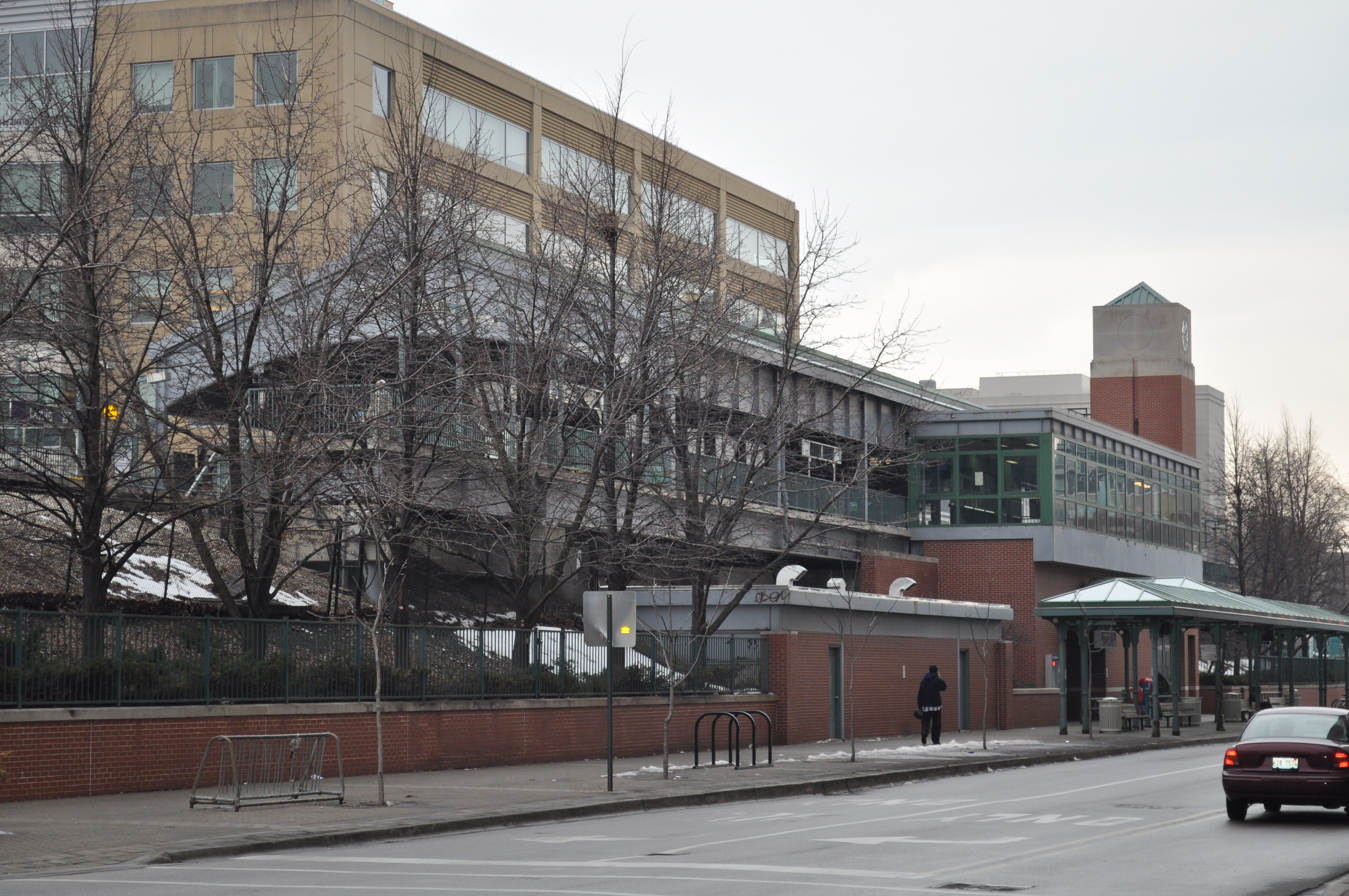
Station exterior and bus terminal

The current station was reconstructed from 1992 to 1994 and is made of brick and concrete with a spacious metal and glass train shed, but lacks the styling or decoration found in many other CTA stations, giving Davis a modern urban, if utilitarian, feel. The station sports two prominent clock towers, on the west and east sides. Several paintings hang in various areas of the platform. It is the only accessible intermediate station on the Purple Line during off-peak hours. It also has a light-board system and a speaker system to alert passengers to train delays. A retail space is on the lower level, near the fare card vending machines.

=== Platform signage ===
Davis is one of the four test sites for the Active Transit Station Signs (ATSS) program. In September 2002, the signs were installed at the station. The signs display preprogrammed and service-related messages as well as a countdown until the next train; however, the Davis station's signs do not display the countdown feature due to a programming glitch.

== Transportation ==
=== Bus ===
CTA

- 93 California/Dodge
- 201 Central/Ridge (Monday–Saturday only)
- 206 Evanston Circulator (school days only)

Pace

- 208 Golf Road
- 213 Green Bay Road (Monday–Saturday only)
- 250 Dempster Street
- Pulse Dempster Line

=== Rail ===
Metra

- Union Pacific North (at Davis Street/Evanston)

== See also ==
- Church Street station, adjacent station for the defunct North Shore Line
