= South Boulevard station =

Chicago "L" station

South Blvd 525N 500W
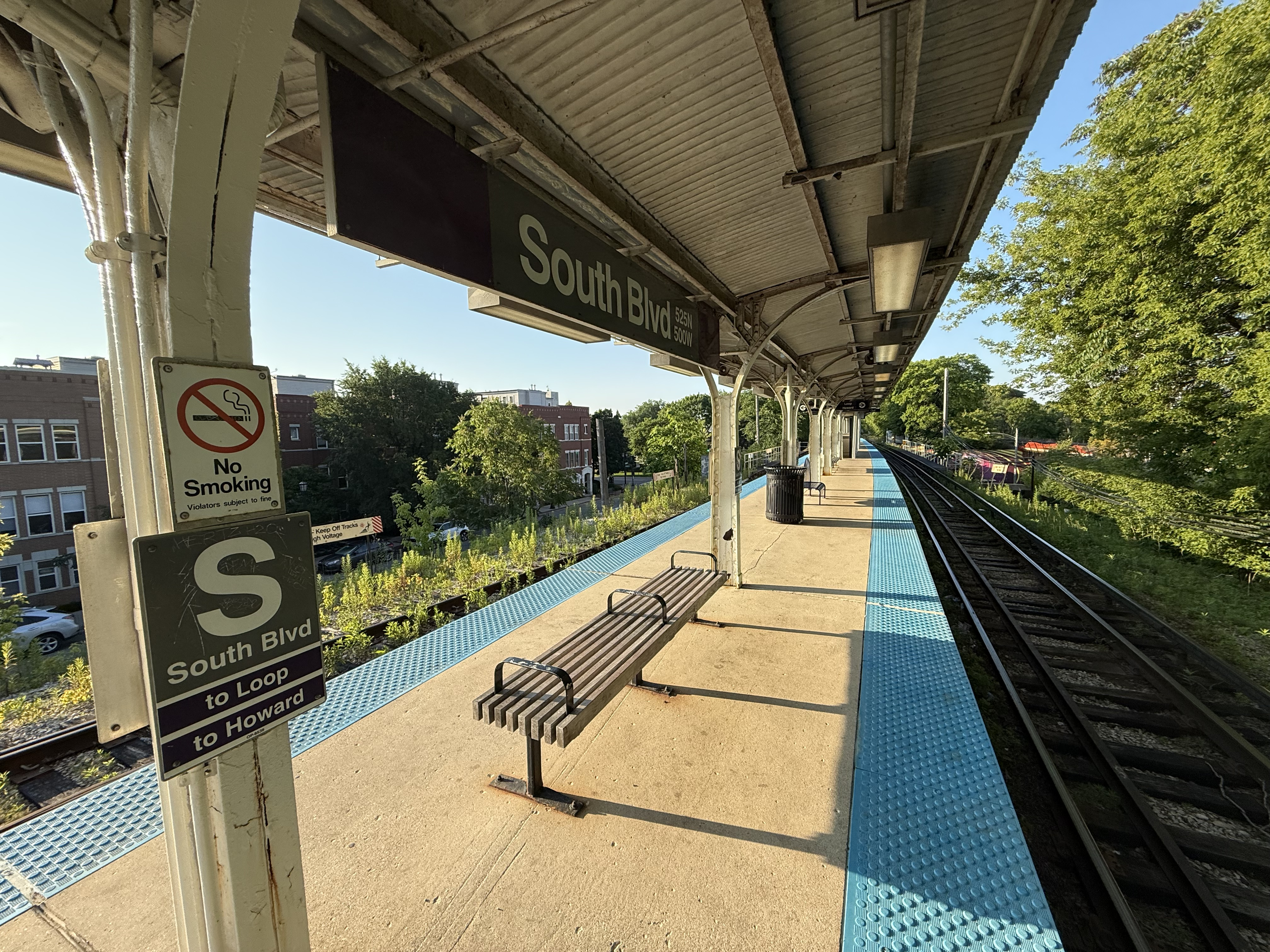

General information
- Location: 602 South Boulevard; Evanston, Illinois 60202
- Coordinates: 42.02758°N 87.67841°W
- Owner: Chicago Transit Authority
- Line: Evanston branch
- Platforms: 1 island platform
- Tracks: 2
- Connections: CTA and Pace buses

Construction
- Structure type: Elevated
- Parking: No
- Accessible: No

History
- Opened: July 1, 1931; 95 years ago

Passengers
- 2025: 126,430 ▲5.5%

Services
| Preceding station | Chicago "L" | Following station |
|---|---|---|
| Main toward Linden | Purple Line | Howard Terminus |
| Main toward Linden | Purple Line Express | Howard toward Loop (Clark/Lake) |
Track layout
Location

South Boulevard, (shortened to South Blvd) is a station on the Chicago Transit Authority's 'L' system, on the Purple Line at 602 South Boulevard in Evanston, Illinois (directional coordinates 525 north, 500 west).

The station's predecessor, Calvary, was originally a combined facility between the Chicago and North Western Railway (C&NW) and the Chicago and Evanston Railroad (C&E). On May 16, 1908, the extension of Northwestern Elevated Railroad led to the C&E station being replaced with a separate rapid transit station. The old Calvary station was replaced by South Boulevard, which opened on July 1, 1931. Designed by Arthur Gerber, South Boulevard consists of a winding central platform to the shape of the street that overlooks. It is now very similar to the original station, only catenary maintained by steel arches disappeared in 1973 during the installation of an electric rail to the ground while the lighting was renewed in 1998. For the rest, except for renovation from 2004 to 2005, the structure has not changed.

== History ==
=== Calvary station ===
Calvary station was located at 400 Chicago Avenue, across from the entrance to Calvary Cemetery. Calvary opened on May 16, 1908, along with multiple stations between Wilson and Central stations. The station was closed in 1931 in favor of the present station. After its closure, Calvary remained boarded and abandoned for seven decades before being demolished in February 1995.

=== South Boulevard station ===
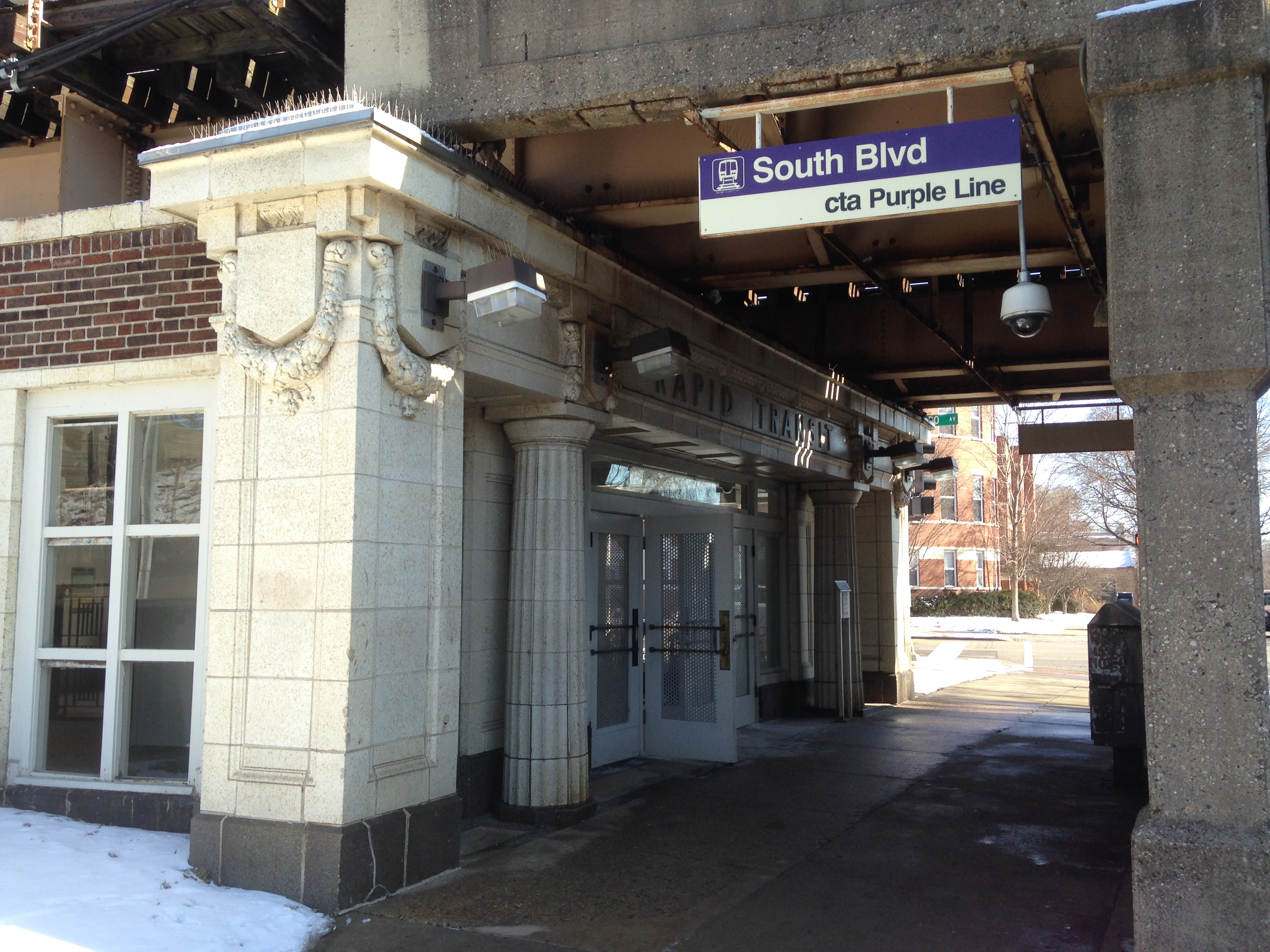
South Boulevard station house in 2020

The current station has been in place since July 1, 1931 to better serve the developing residential area directly to the north of the cemetery. The station has only received little renovation since then, like new lighting and signage.

The closure of the South Boulevard station (along with Foster) appeared as part of three of the CTA's six potential options for the renovation of the Purple Line and northern section of the Red Line.

== Bus connections ==
CTA

- 206 Evanston Circulator (school days only)

Pace

- 213 Green Bay Road (Monday–Saturday only)
