= Lekotek =

Toy programme for disabled children

Lekotek is an international program to lend Assistive Technology, toys and expertise to disabled children. The first lekotek opened in 1963 in Stockholm, Sweden. From there the concept spread to other Scandinavian countries, Europe and the rest of the world. For example, there are over 50 lekoteks in the United States. The first American lekotek opened in Evanston, Illinois in 1980. The first US lekoteks were founded by Sally DeVencentis and Sharon Draznin.

The name is a mix of the Swedish root word "lek," meaning toy or play, and the Greek suffix "tek" that connotes library.

== Underlying concept ==
The underlying concept is that early intervention through play with adapted toys and technology can teach disabled children to deal with the "normal" world. Some of theoretical basis for the lekotek movement comes from work done by a British psychologist, Elizabeth Newson. Her book "Toys and Playthings, " (ISBN 0-394-42830-7) discusses the effect of play on child development.

== Launch of AblePlay ==
In November 2005, the National Lekotek Center launched their new AblePlay website at www.AblePlay.org providing access to authoritative ratings and detailed reviews from National Lekotek professionals on loads of toys and other play products. Lekotek's unique evaluation process yields product information categorized by disability category to further simplify the toy-buying experience. Parents and professionals can benefit from insightful play ideas for each toy, as well as from the online forums to allow them to share experiences and provide personal advice to each other. Launching AblePlay was an important step in realizing Lekotek's goal to be the central source of information and support services involving toys and play for kids with special needs. National Lekotek is a division of Anixter Center which provides services to more than 5,000 adults and children with disabilities through 70 programs at 35 locations annually.
