= Davis Street/Evanston station =

Commuter rail station in Evanston, Illinois

Coordinates: 42.047962°N 87.684682°W

Davis Street Evanston

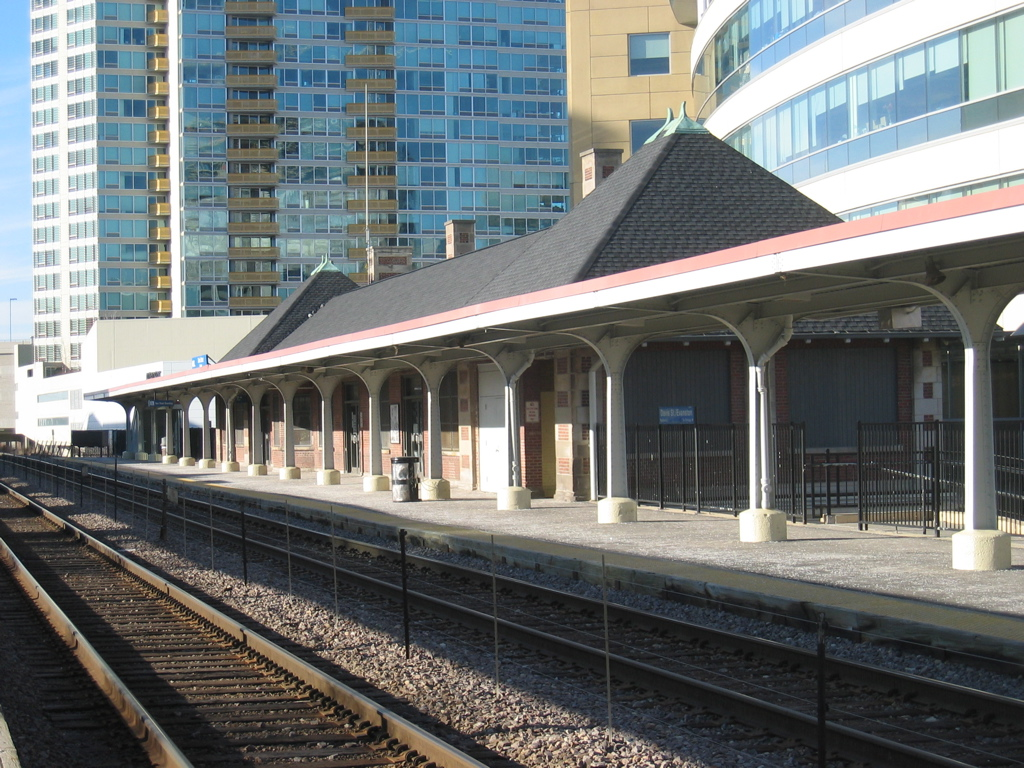

General information
- Location: 901 Davis Street; Evanston, Illinois 60201
- Owner: Union Pacific
- Platforms: 2 side platforms
- Tracks: 2
- Connections: Purple at Davis; Pace and CTA Buses; Pace Pulse Dempster Line

Construction
- Parking: Yes
- Cycle facilities: Yes
- Accessible: Yes

Other information
- Fare zone: 2

History
- Opened: 1910
- Rebuilt: 1978

Passengers
- 2018: 1,876 (average weekday) ▼3.2%
- Rank: 12 out of 236

Services
Preceding station	Metra	Following station
Central Street/Evanston toward Kenosha	Union Pacific North	Main Street/Evanston toward Ogilvie TC
Former services
Preceding station	Chicago and North Western Railway	Following station
Winnetka toward Minneapolis	Chicago – Minneapolis via Milwaukee	Chicago Terminus
Central Street toward Milwaukee	Milwaukee Division	Dempster Street toward Chicago
Track layout
Location

Davis Street/Evanston is a commuter railroad station in downtown Evanston, Illinois. It is served by Metra's Union Pacific North Line with trains going south to Ogilvie Transportation Center in Chicago and as far north as Kenosha, Wisconsin. In Metra's zone-based fare system, Davis Street is in zone 2. As of 2018, Davis Street is the 12th busiest of Metra's 236 non-downtown stations, with an average of 1,876 weekday boardings. The station is next to the Davis station of the Chicago Transit Authority's Purple Line, where CTA and Pace buses terminate. Between the two stations is 909 Davis Street, a six-story building with a kiss-and-ride loop for car drop-off.

Davis Street station, at Davis Street and Maple Avenue, has two elevated platforms. Northbound trains stop at the west platform and southbound trains stop at the east platform. The ticket agent's office is on the east platform. At ground level, there is a restaurant called Chef's Station. Just to the east of the Davis CTA station is the 12-story Sherman Avenue Garage.

As of September 20, 2025, Davis Street is served by all 71 trains (35 inbound, 36 outbound) on weekdays, and by all 30 trains (15 in each direction) on weekends and holidays. During the summer concert season, an extra weekend train to Ravinia Park station also stops here.

This is the closest Metra station to most of the buildings on Northwestern University's Evanston campus, with the exception of Ryan Field, which is closer to Evanston Central Street station.

== History ==
When the Chicago & Milwaukee railroad, the predecessor of the Chicago and North Western Railway was built, there was only a single track. The stations were placed on the North side of tracks on the other C&NW West line, the original Chicago and Galena Union line. The station buildings were built on the side for inbound Chicago passengers.

The Davis Street station was the only stop in Evanston for intercity Chicago and North Western Railway trains, such as the Twin Cities 400. The Union Pacific bought the assets of the C&NW in 1995.

== Transportation ==
The Davis Street Metra station is only steps west of the CTA station and, together with that station, forms a transportation center allowing easy transfer from one station to the other, there is also a pedestrian walkway.

=== Rail ===
CTA Purple Line

- Davis

=== Bus ===
CTA

- 93 California/Dodge
- 201 Central/Ridge (Monday–Saturday only)
- 206 Evanston Circulator (school days only)

Pace

- 208 Golf Road
- 213 Green Bay Road (Monday–Saturday only)
- 250 Dempster Street
- Pulse Dempster Line
