= Calvary station (Chicago and North Western Railway) =

Chicago rail station

Calvary
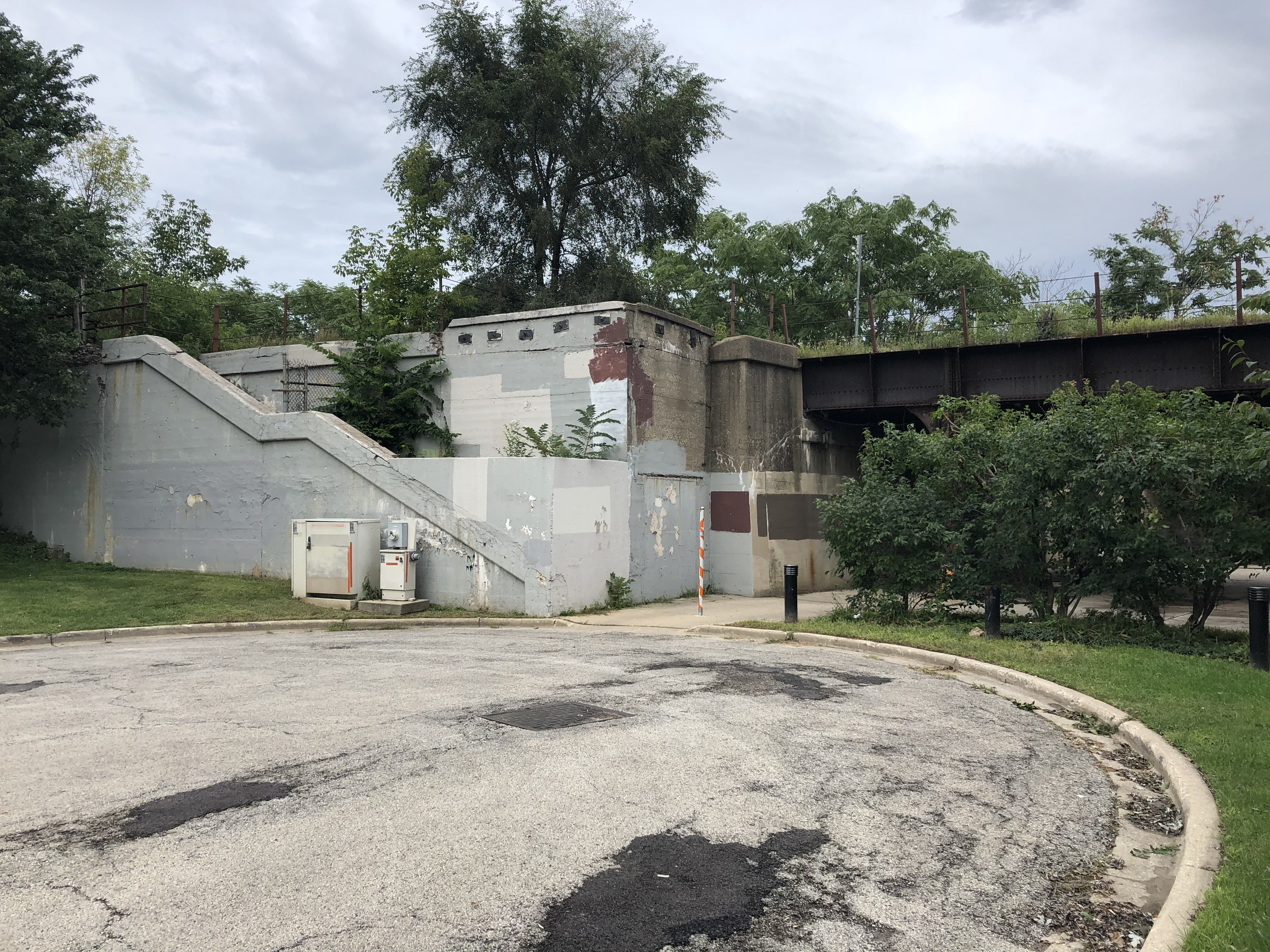
- Staircase leading to the northbound platform

General information
- Location: Mulford Street; Evanston, Illinois 60202
- Coordinates: 42.0230°N 87.6777°W
- Lines: Kenosha Subdivision; Chicago and Evanston Railroad
- Platforms: 2 side platforms (C&NW); 1 side platform (C&E)
- Tracks: 3 (C&NW); 2 (C&E)

History
- Closed: May 16, 1908 (C&E); December 1, 1958
- Rebuilt: c. 1908

Former services
Preceding station	Chicago and North Western Railway	Following station
Main Street toward Milwaukee	Milwaukee Division	Rogers Park toward Chicago
Preceding station	Milwaukee Road	Following station
South Evanston toward Llewellyn Park	Chicago – Evanston	Birchwood toward Chicago
Location

Calvary was a commuter railroad station on the Chicago and North Western Railway's Milwaukee Division, today's Union Pacific North Line. The station was located at Mulford Street and Chicago Avenue, in Evanston, Illinois.

== History ==
Calvary opened as a stop on the Chicago and Milwaukee Railroad, which operated between Chicago and Waukegan and served the adjacent Calvary Cemetery in (what was then) the village of South Evanston. At the time, the line only had a single track. The station was situated on the east side of the line, across Chicago Avenue from the main entrance to the cemetery (approximately mid way between Mulford and Oakton Streets). In May 1866, the Chicago and Milwaukee Railroad was leased in perpetuity to the Chicago and North Western Railway with the Chicago–Milwaukee line becoming the Chicago and North Western’s Milwaukee Division. A second track was later added in 1882.

Following the opening of the Chicago and Evanston Railroad (whose right-of-way paralleled that of the Milwaukee Division through South Evanston) in May 1885, Calvary became a joint facility shared between the two companies with each railroad paying half for the cost and use of the station. At this time, the Chicago and North Western had two tracks passing the area, however a third track branched off from the eastern track to the east north of the station, passed through the facility, and terminated south of the station. A pair of side platforms were provided for boarding and alighting from the western and easternmost tracks while an island platform was set between the two eastern tracks. The Chicago and Evanston side, immediately east of the North Western, was less complex. This line had two tracks which passed by the cemetery entrance, but only one platform was provided and this was set on the west side of the western track. A joint station building was set between the two rail lines.

On May 16, 1908, the Northwestern Elevated Railroad assumed operation of the Chicago and Evanston line north of Wilson Avenue in Chicago and replaced the line’s existing passenger service with its own. To facilitate the new rapid transit service, the Northwestern Elevated elected not to reuse the existing C&E stations and instead built its own at the same locations. The cessation of Milwaukee Road service over the Chicago and Evanston line brought an end to the dual operation of the Calvary station.

Following the elevation of the line through Evanston onto a solid fill embankment in 1908, the station was moved south to the north side of Mulford Street and the line was upgraded with a third track. The reconstruction simplified the station’s layout. The new station had a pair of side platforms serving the outer two tracks which were reached by a set of stairways leading down to Mulford Street. Consistent with the North Western’s left-hand running, the eastern track and platform served southbound trains (to Chicago) while the western track and platform served northbound trains (to Milwaukee). The center track was a bidirectional through track and did not serve the station. A new station building was erected at track level on the east side of the tracks and, as with Rose Hill to the south, Calvary was equipped with an elevator to allow pallbearers on funeral trains to bring coffins down to the ground for interment in Calvary Cemetery.

By the 1950s, the management of the Chicago and North Western began to reassess its commuter service and came to the conclusion that the road could be operated more economically and efficiently by closing stations in and near Chicago and focusing on suburban and long-haul traffic. To this end, the company went before the Illinois Commerce Commission in June 1958, requesting permission to abandon more than twenty stops, alter train schedules, revise its ticketing structure, and raise fares on monthly tickets. On November 14, the ICC ruled in favor of granting the majority of the North Western’s requests, including the closure of the Calvary station. The fare increase and service alterations went into effect on December 1, 1958, and Calvary was abandoned along with twenty other stations either in or near Chicago on the Milwaukee, Galena, and Wisconsin Divisions.
