= Dempster station =

Chicago "L" station

Dempster 1300N 800W
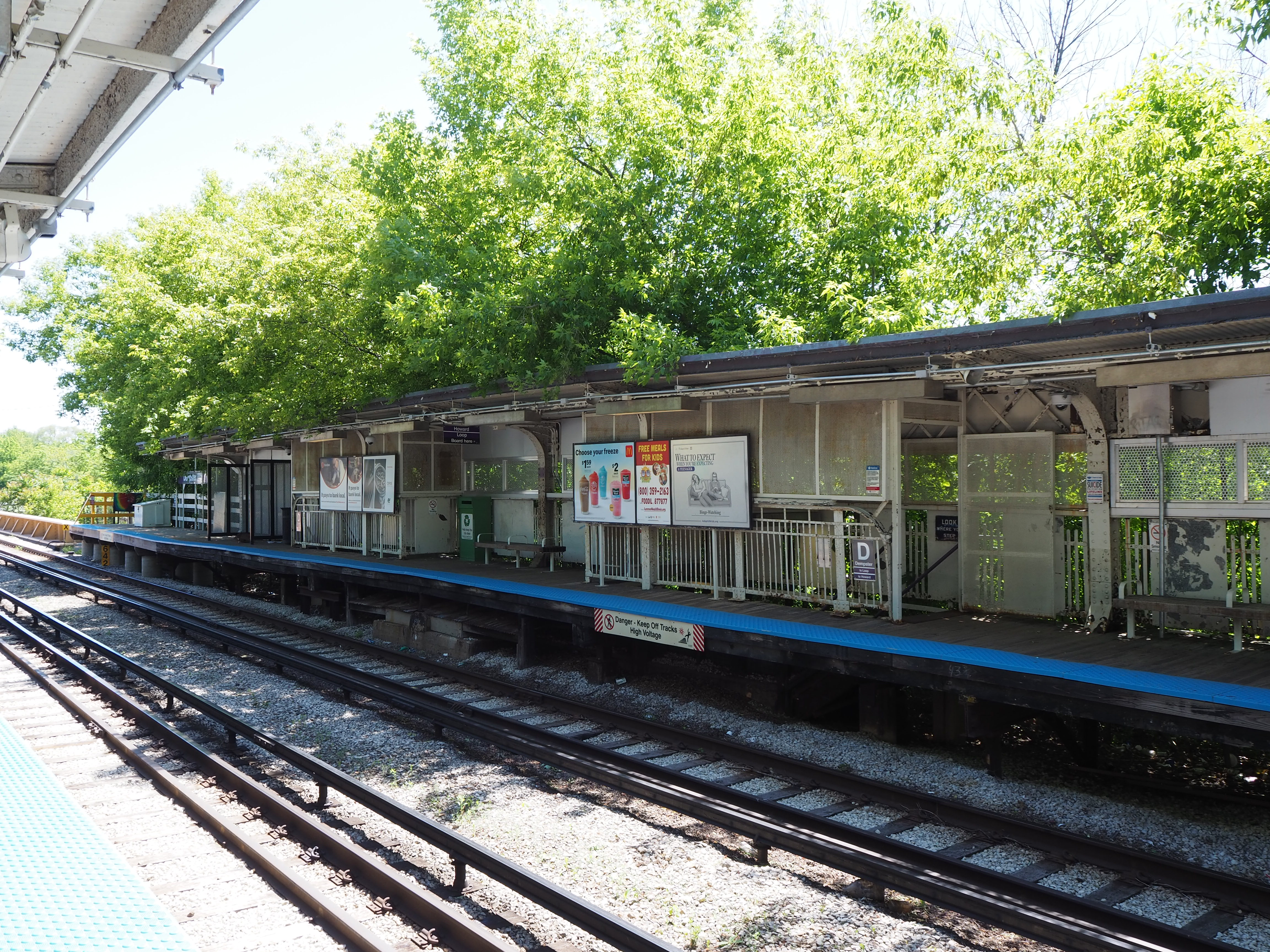

General information
- Location: 1316 Sherman Place; Evanston, Illinois 60201
- Coordinates: 42.04187°N 87.68237°W
- Owner: Chicago Transit Authority
- Line: Evanston Branch
- Platforms: 2 side platforms
- Tracks: 2
- Connections: CTA and Pace buses

Construction
- Structure type: Elevated
- Accessible: No

History
- Opened: May 16, 1908; 118 years ago
- Rebuilt: 1909; 117 years ago

Passengers
- 2025: 160,647 ▲9.2%

Services
Preceding station	Chicago "L"	Following station
Davis toward Linden	Purple Line	Main toward Howard or Loop (Clark/Lake)
Former services
Preceding station	Milwaukee Road	Following station
Evanston toward Llewellyn Park	Chicago – Evanston	South Evanston toward Chicago
Track layout
Location

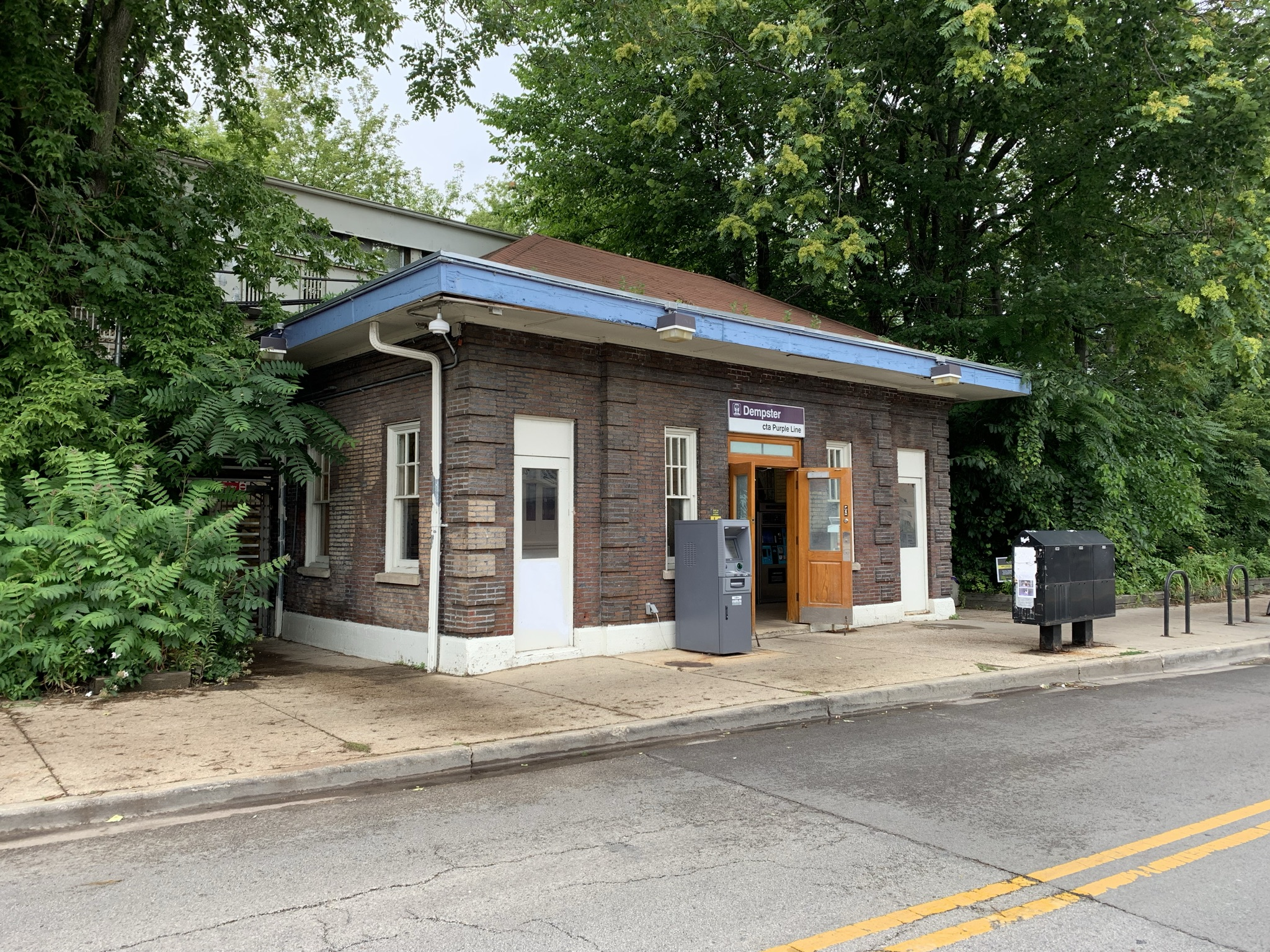
The Dempster station house in 2021

Dempster is an 'L' station on the CTA's Purple Line at 1316 Sherman Place in Evanston, Illinois (directional coordinates 1300 north, 800 west).

The current station has been in place since 1910. A 1991 CTA budget crisis almost precipitated the station's closure, but the CTA decided to keep it open. Dempster is now one of the stations on the CTA's 2004-2008 Capital Improvement Plan.

== Bus connections ==
CTA

- 206 Evanston Circulator (school days only)

Pace

- 213 Green Bay Road (Monday–Saturday only)
