= Purple Line (CTA) =

Rapid transit line in Illinois, US

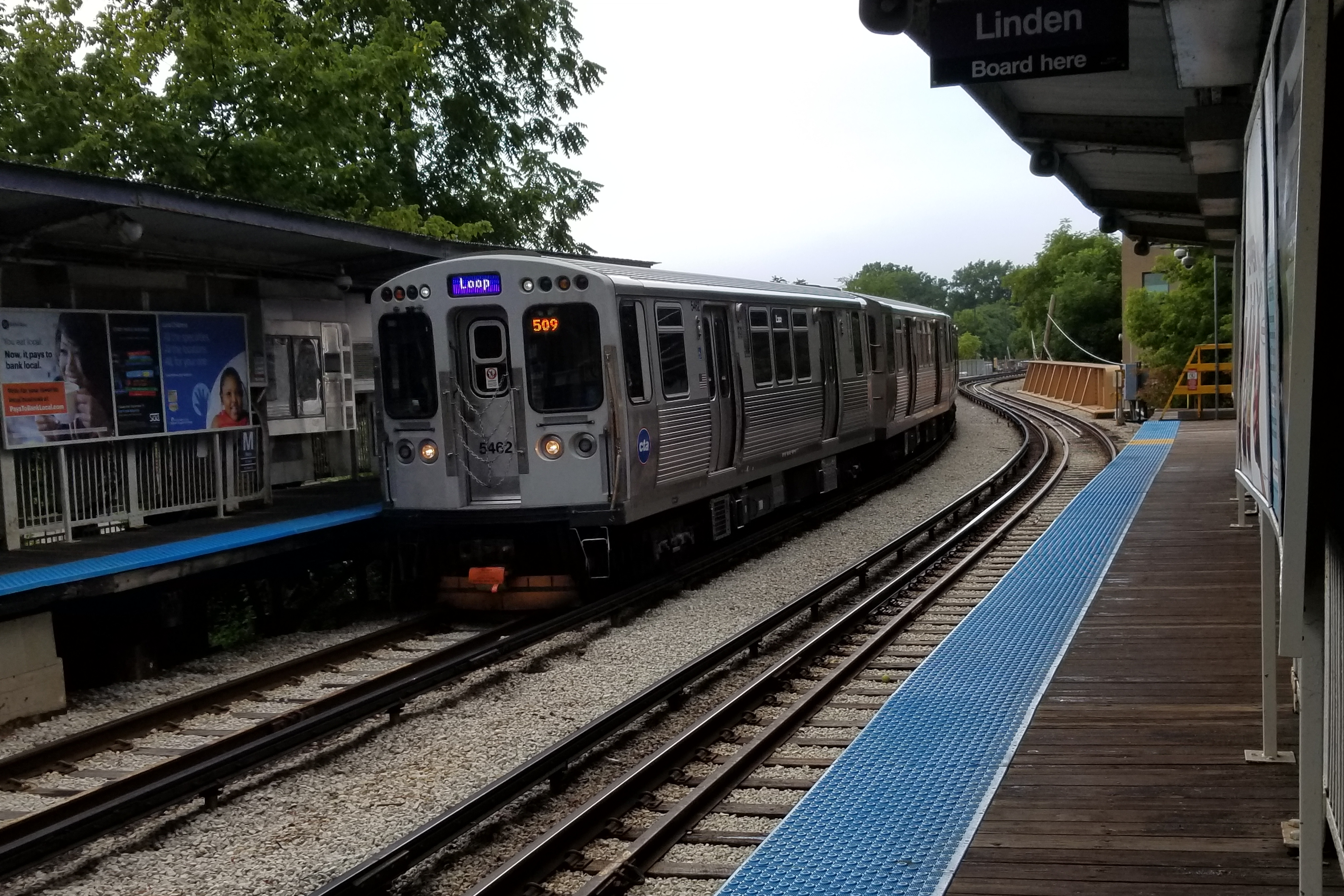
- A Loop-bound 5000-series Purple Line train at Main

Overview
- Status: Operational
- Locale: Chicago, Evanston and Wilmette, Illinois, United States
- Termini: Linden; Howard The Loop (weekday rush hours only)
- Stations: 26 (weekday rush hours); 9 (all other times)

Service
- Type: Rapid transit
- System: Chicago "L"
- Operator: Chicago Transit Authority
- Depot(s): Howard Yard, Linden Yard
- Rolling stock: 5000-series 6-car trains (typical, maximum)
- Daily ridership: 4,904 (avg. weekday 2024)

History
- Opened: May 16, 1908; 118 years ago (line opened); July 31, 1949; 77 years ago (current operation)
- Transferred to Chicago Transit Authority: October 1, 1947

Technical
- Line length: 15 mi (24 km)
- Character: Elevated and at-grade
- Track gauge: 4 ft 8 1/2 in (1,435 mm) standard gauge
- Minimum radius: 90 feet (27 m)
- Electrification: Third rail, 600 V DC
Route map
Regular service Express service

The Purple Line of the Chicago "L" is a 3.9-mile (6.3 km) route on the northernmost section of the system. The service begins from Linden station in Wilmette, north of Chicago, and ends at Howard station in the Rogers Park neighborhood on Chicago's North Side, along the way making various stops at stations in the city of Evanston.

During weekday morning and afternoon rush hours, the Purple Line extends another 10.3 miles (16.6 km) south on the North Side Main Line, making its entire run in rush hour from Howard to Downtown Chicago. During these periods, the line runs express from Howard to Wilson, then express from Wilson to Belmont, then making all local stops from Belmont to the Loop. The express service is known as the Purple Line Express (or the Evanston Express).

In 2024, the average weekday boardings on the Purple Line was 4,904. It is the shortest route in the CTA rail system except during weekday peaks and rush hours.

Prior to the color-coding of CTA rail lines in 1993, the Purple Line was known as the Evanston Line, Evanston Service or Evanston Shuttle, and the Purple Line Express was called the Evanston Express. Internally, it is still referred to as the Evanston branch, with the Loop-bound service referred to as the Evanston Express.

The Purple Line is useful for reaching Northwestern University (Foster and Noyes stops in Evanston), including the sports facilities Ryan Field, Rocky Miller Park, Welsh-Ryan Arena, and Canal Shores Golf Course — all at the Central stop — and the Bahá'í House of Worship at Linden. The selection of purple as the line's color was likely from Northwestern's official school color.

== Operation ==
=== Trackage ===
Beginning at Linden Avenue in Wilmette, which contains a small storage yard and car service shop, the Purple Line traverses the North Shore area on private right-of-way which begins at street grade. Running southeasterly from Wilmette, the line rises past Isabella Street on the Wilmette-Evanston border, then bridges the North Shore Channel immediately north of Central Street, the first stop in Evanston. The line, now on an elevated embankment, curves southward parallel to Sherman Avenue. Continuing south, the line enters downtown Evanston and stops at Davis Street, then curves southeasterly again to parallel Chicago Avenue and Metra's Union Pacific Railroad right-of-way to just north of the CTA's Howard Yard facilities.

Here the line crosses through the yard area before the junction with the Red Line and the Yellow Line. The tracks are split on grade-separated structures to allow Yellow Line trains to enter the junction from the west. Immediately south of the yard lies the Howard Street terminal, where Red, Purple and Yellow Line trains all terminate.

There are four operational tracks starting at Howard Street, continuing southward to Armitage. During weekday rush hours, the Purple Line runs express on the outer tracks, skipping all stops until Wilson Avenue, and then to Belmont Avenue. From Belmont Avenue to Armitage Avenue, the Purple and Brown Lines share the outside tracks and both make all stops along the route. From just south of Armitage Avenue to just north of Chicago Avenue, they are on a two-track line on a 4-track structure. After the North Shore Line ceased operations in 1963, the outer tracks in this area were rarely used and received next to no maintenance; they were permanently taken out of service in 1976.

=== Routing ===
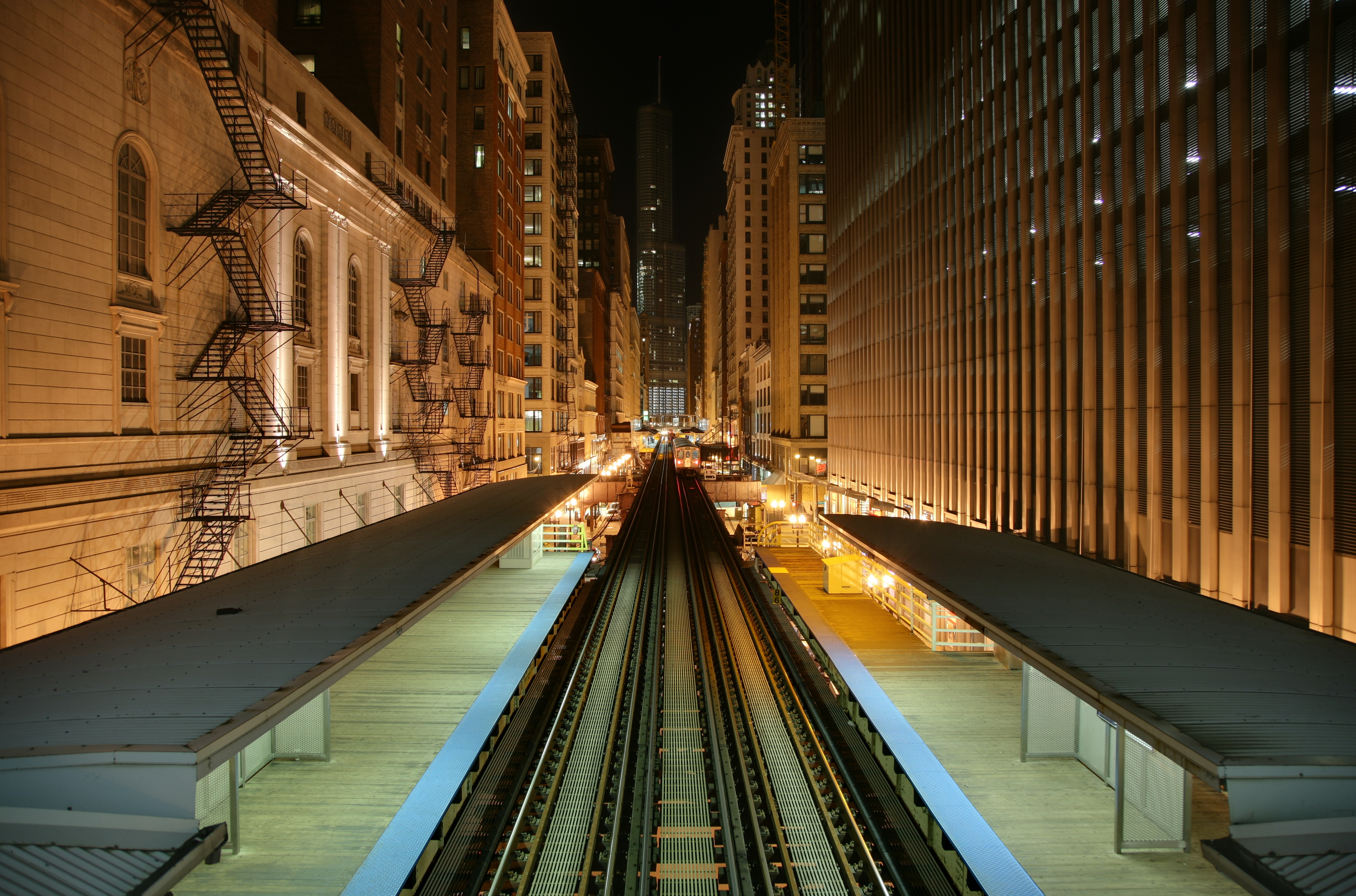
Northward view from the Adams/Wabash station at night

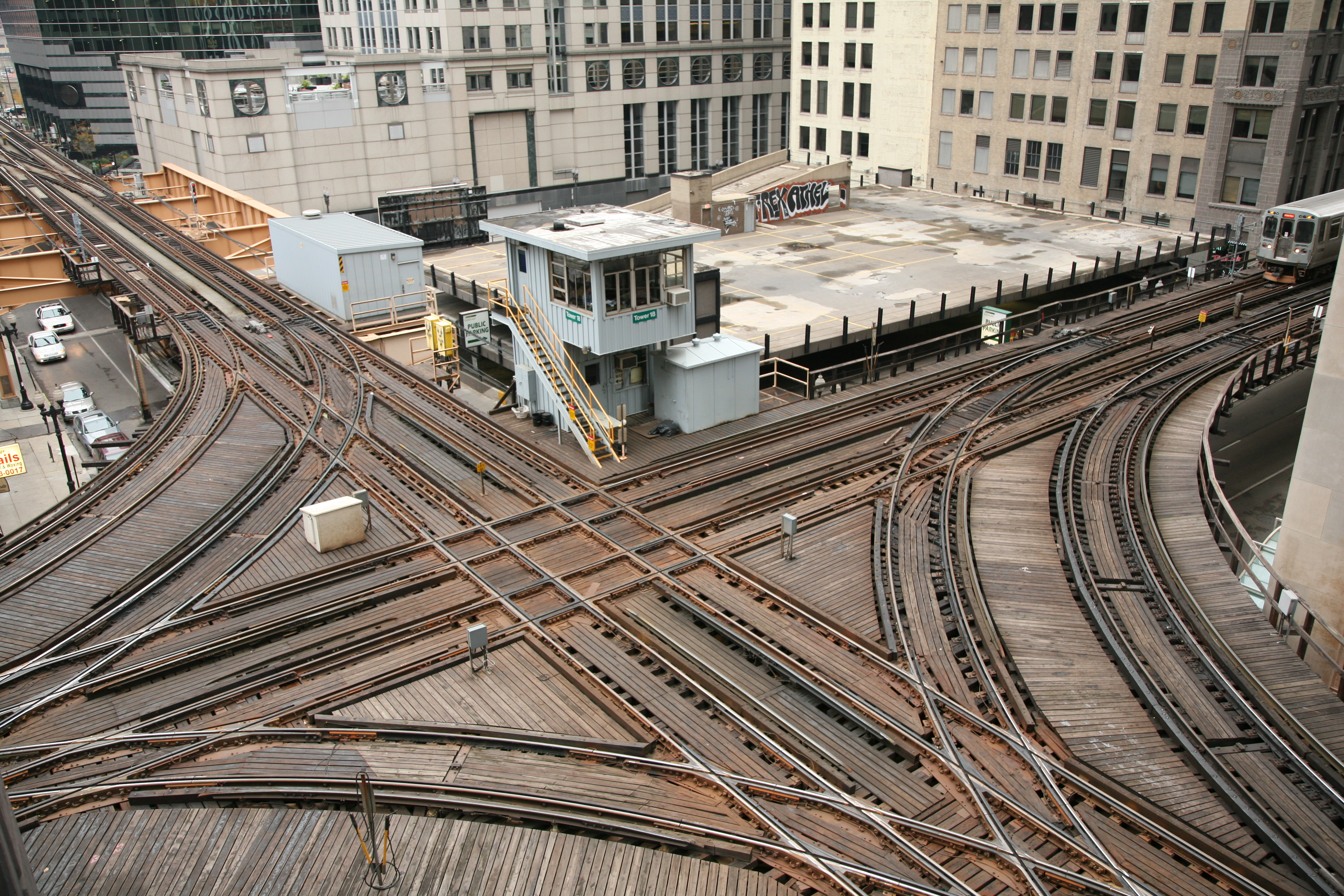
The northwestern corner of the Loop, through which the Purple Line Express passes

The original routing of the Purple Line Express was clockwise around the Inner Loop track via Lake-Wabash-Van Buren-Wells, making all Loop stops before returning to Merchandise Mart and making all stops northbound to Linden. Beginning April 2, 2007, the Purple Line Express was rerouted onto the Outer Loop track along with the Brown Line due to the construction at the Belmont and Fullerton stations (see below). Prior to this, Purple Line Express trains were occasionally diverted to the Outer Loop track in the event of emergencies or signal problems in the Loop. On December 4, 2008, the CTA announced that the Purple Line Express would return to the original Inner Loop routing on December 29.

If a problem occurs on the North Side Main Line between the Loop and the Fullerton station, the Purple Line is generally routed into the State Street subway, following the Red Line to Roosevelt before returning north.

For several years, inbound afternoon Purple Line Express trains stopped at Addison before weekday evening Chicago Cubs baseball games, in order to provide direct service to Wrigley Field for passengers coming from northern Chicago, Evanston and Skokie. However, because of a platform reconfiguration in the early 1990s, trains had to cross over to the inner Red Line tracks, as there is no platform access to the outer tracks at Addison. As a result of the Brown Line construction and in an effort to minimize delays, Purple Line Express trains in some years stop at Sheridan — one station north of Addison — before evening Cubs games. (That station was constructed with two island platforms that can access the express tracks, eliminating the need for trains to switch over.) Depending on the year, either Addison or Sheridan has this extra stop. For example, in 2024 the additional stop for Cubs home games was at Addison, while in 2025 it was at Sheridan.

=== Connections ===
The Purple Line Express, which operates only on weekdays during rush hours, is one of only two 'L' lines to offer transfers to every other line, the other being the Red Line. It is also the only 'L' line to provide non-farecard transfers to every other line (the Red Line does not provide a non-farecard transfer to the Pink Line).

The Purple Line stations at Davis and Main are immediately to the east of their Metra counterparts, while the Washington/Wells, Quincy, LaSalle/Van Buren and Washington/Wabash stations on the express leg are within walking distance of Metra trains at Ogilvie Transportation Center, Union Station, LaSalle Street Station and Millennium Station, respectively.

=== Rolling stock ===
As of November 2018, the Purple Line operates with the Bombardier-built 5000-series railcars. Until late May 2014, 2400-series cars were also assigned to the line and, for the entire 2000s and early 2010s, the Purple Line fleet consisted entirely, or nearly entirely, of 2400-series cars. In spring 2007, a small number of 3200-series railcars were transferred to the line, replacing the 2600-series railcars transferred to other lines. Those 3200-series cars have since been returned to their originally assigned lines. The 2600-series cars were officially assigned to the line until early January 2013 when they were transferred to the Red and Blue Lines.

Beginning in October 2013, the CTA started to reassign the 2600-series cars back to the Purple Line as new Bombardier-built 5000-series cars were deployed to the Red Line. Then, beginning in April 2014, CTA started to assign Bombardier-built 5000-series cars to the Purple Line. In May 2014, the last 2400-series cars on the line were removed from service. In March 2015, the 2600-series cars on the line were also removed from service. The Purple Line typically runs with six cars, occasionally borrowing cars from the Red Line as needed to fill shortages.

== Operating hours and headways ==
The Purple Line operates full-time between Linden and Howard from Mondays to Thursdays from 4:25 a.m. to 1:30 a.m., Fridays from 4:30 a.m. to 2:10 a.m., Saturdays from 5:05 a.m. to 2:15 a.m. and Sundays from 6:05 a.m. to 1:45 a.m. On weekdays, frequencies consist of 12 tph (trains per hour) during rush hours, 6 tph during middays, then 4–5 tph during the evening and 3 tph after midnight. On weekends, service operates 4 tph early morning and night and 5 tph and late afternoons.

The Purple Line Express operates rush hour service between Linden and the Loop on weekday morning only from 5:15 a.m. to 9:20 a.m. (southbound) and from 5:55 a.m. to 10:05 a.m. (northbound). On weekday evenings, service resumes from 2:25 to 6:25 p.m. (southbound) and from 3:05 p.m. to 7:05 p.m. (northbound), with headways of five to eight minutes (with wider headways of 15 minutes possible).

== History ==
=== The Northwestern Elevated era ===
The Evanston Line went into operation on May 16, 1908, between Central Street, Evanston, and the Loop when the former Northwestern Elevated Railroad extended its mainline service over leased electrified steam railroad trackage owned by the Chicago, Milwaukee, St. Paul and Pacific Railroad. On April 2, 1912, the line reached its present-day terminal at Linden Avenue, Wilmette. The new terminal was established without the permission of Wilmette residents, who feared rail service would encourage construction of large apartment buildings in the affluent community.

In 1922, the surface-level section of the North Side 'L' was elevated onto a concrete embankment between Leland Avenue and Howard Street and was expanded from two to four tracks, allowing complete express service from Wilmette and Evanston to downtown Chicago. Several segments of the Evanston Branch itself ran at street level until 1928, when a section between Church Street and the North Shore Channel was elevated onto a concrete embankment. It went into operation on October 5, 1928. Nine stations existed north of Howard, including a station at Calvary. That station closed in 1931 and was replaced by a new station at South Boulevard, to the north.

=== CTA era ===
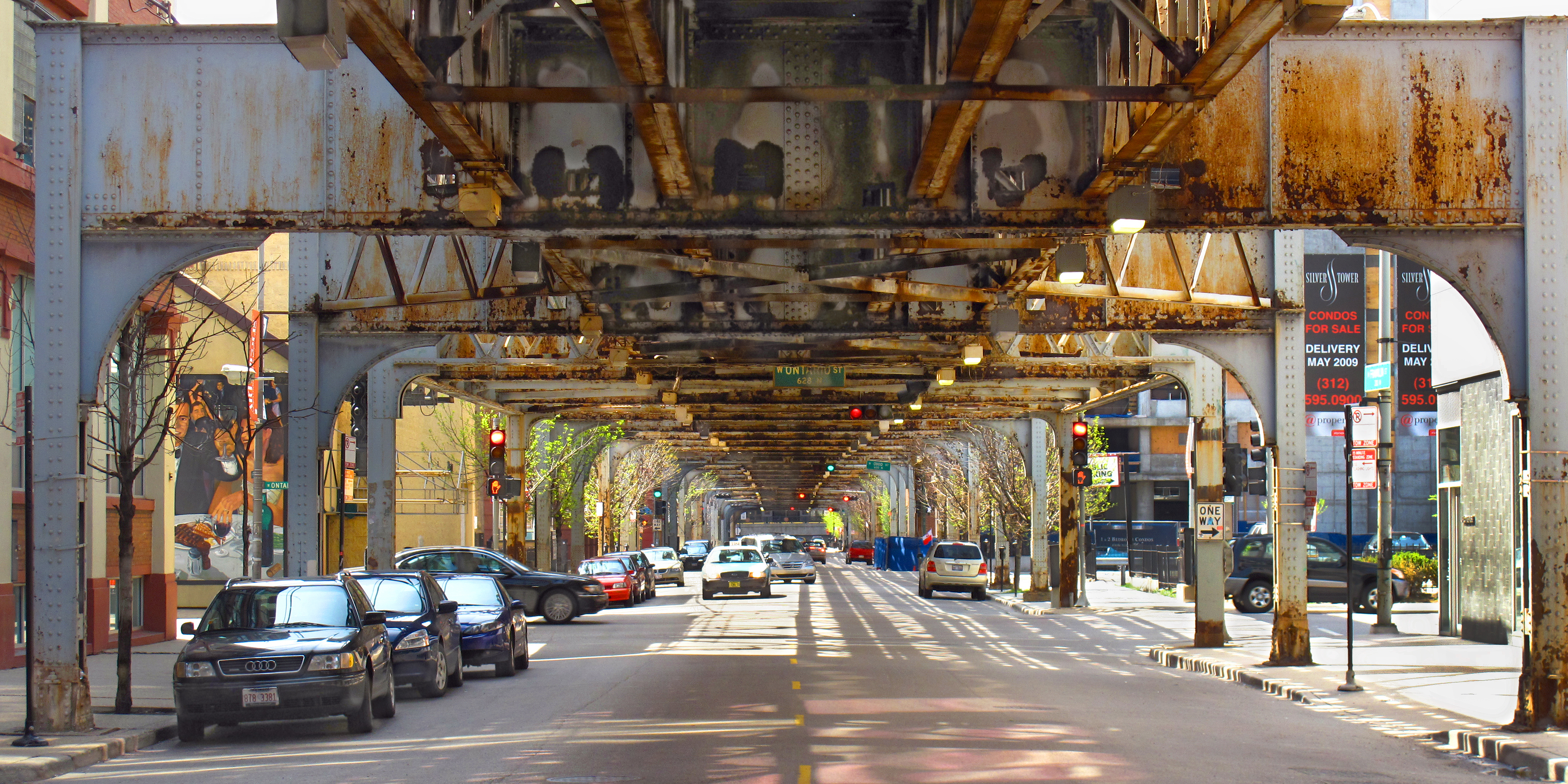
The Brown and Purple Express lines run above vehicle traffic on Franklin Street in the Near North Side community area.

The service which was to become the Purple Line was transferred to the Chicago Transit Authority along with Chicago's other rail transit services on October 1, 1947. The current service pattern went into effect on July 31, 1949, after a massive service reorientation on the North–South rapid transit system. Local service, operating between Linden Avenue and Howard Street, ran at all times. The express service ran only during weekday rush hours, stopping at all stations in Wilmette and Evanston, plus Howard, Morse (formerly Rogers Park), Loyola, Wilson, Chicago/Franklin, Merchandise Mart and all elevated Loop stations. While skip-stop service was also introduced at this time, Evanston express trains continued to make stops at all these stations. An express surcharge was also instituted for customers traveling to and from the Loop north of Howard. Several attempts were made to reduce or eliminate the additional fare, backed by local politicians.

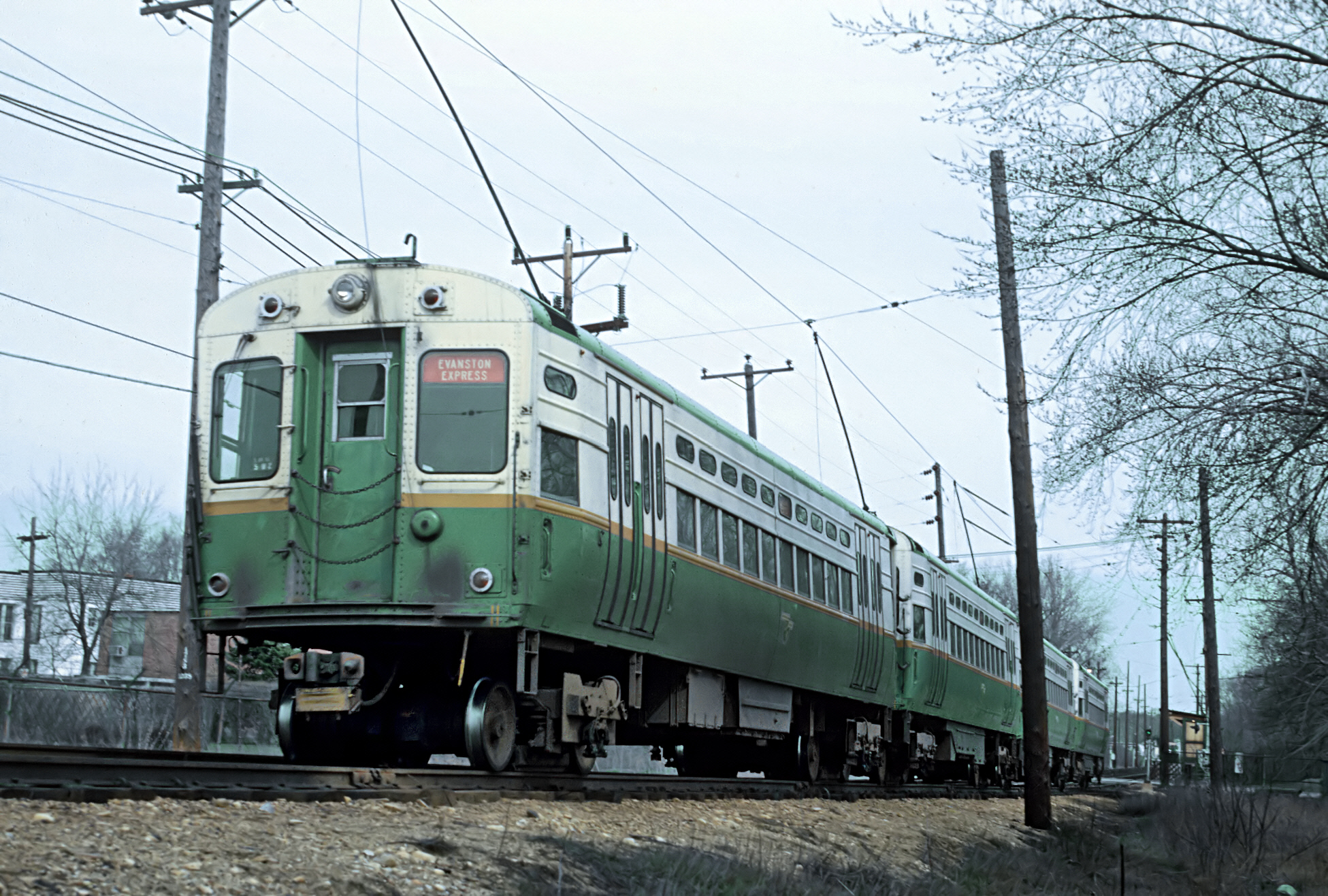
An Evanston shuttle train being powered from overhead lines in 1966

Right-of-way and trackage used by the Evanston Branch and the North–South Route (today's Red Line) between Leland Avenue and the Wilmette terminal was purchased by the CTA in 1953 from the Chicago, Milwaukee, St. Paul and Pacific Railroad. In turn, the railroad received US$7 million in CTA revenue bonds.

Midday and Saturday Loop express service was discontinued in the 1950s and the local shuttle service began using one-man operations with single unit cars in the 1960s.

On July 16, 1973, the Isabella station closed, bringing the total number of stations on the Evanston branch to eight.

On November 8, 1973, the third-rail electrification system was installed on the Evanston Branch between South Boulevard in Evanston and the Wilmette terminal. Prior to this, Evanston shuttle trains had to be equipped with trolley poles that collected power from overhead catenary wires (similar to the Yellow Line before its conversion to third-rail power in 2004). The third-rail conversion allowed the CTA to retire the 4000-series cars, which were nearly 50 years old, and put newer cars on the line. Since parts of the line are at grade level, some in the community initially resisted the conversion, worrying that the proximity of the rail would prove hazardous.

By the end of 1976, the Evanston Express ran nonstop between Howard and Merchandise Mart, no longer stopping at Morse, Loyola, Wilson or Chicago/Franklin. The CTA cited complaints about service delays due to the extra stops as justification for the changes.

However, on January 20, 1989, express trains once more began making additional stops outside the Loop, at the Belmont and Fullerton stations, in order to relieve overcrowding on the rapidly growing Ravenswood branch (now the Brown Line). By the end of the 1990s, trains would make all stops between Belmont and the Loop.

The express surcharge was eventually dropped in 1997 as an incentive for customers to use the new TransitCard system.

The overnight "owl service" was eliminated during a service purge by the CTA on April 26, 1998. However, the hours of express operation were expanded on December 16, 2001, for a 180-day trial period. Trains departed Linden for downtown one hour earlier in the morning rush and one hour later in the evening rush. The expanded hours were later made permanent and in 2004 afternoon rush service was also revised to begin 25 minutes earlier.

In 2005, the CTA embarked on a project to replace six deteriorating viaducts on the Evanston branch of the Purple Line. The poor condition of the century-old viaducts forced the implementation of permanent slow zones and had been a growing source of contention for many Evanston politicians. Earlier, in 2003, they claimed CTA had secured funds and promised to begin replacing the viaducts starting in 1999, but had instead diverted the funds to other projects. The CTA responded then that it had provided only cost projections and had not committed the money to any specific purpose. Construction work on the Main Street viaduct began in mid-August, 2005. The viaduct itself was completely replaced over the weekend of November 12–13, requiring the temporary shutdown of the Purple Line. Construction was completed by the Monday-morning rush hour. The Church Street viaduct (adjacent to the Davis station) was replaced next; preliminary work at that location began in July 2006 and the new viaduct was installed in late October 2006 during another weekend closure of the Purple Line.

The Purple Line's Howard terminal underwent a major renovation from 2006 until 2009, during which it was completely rebuilt and made ADA-accessible. Major work on the station progressed throughout 2007, causing temporary platform boarding changes, typically on the weekends.

The Purple Line Express has often been targeted for elimination during service purges due to its "auxiliary" nature compared to other CTA rail lines, the rationalization being that there are readily available, albeit slower, alternatives along its entire route. One of the first moves at halting express service came in 1973 while one of the more recent was in 2005, when threatened service cuts included the Purple Line Express.

The CTA budget crisis continued into 2007 and the Purple Line Express was once again selected as one of several routes to be eliminated if additional funding was not provided. The suggested service cuts would have taken effect September 17, 2007. However, the final plan retained the downtown service, making the stop at Sheridan permanent to supplement the Red Line and providing additional capacity following the elimination of 39 bus routes. Express operation would be a day-to-day decision; if the Red Line was too crowded, Purple Line Express trains would make all local stops between Howard and Belmont, resuming its regular route at that station.

The service cuts were scheduled to be implemented on September 16, 2007, but the CTA received a last-minute $24 million advance on its 2008 operating subsidy, postponing the changes until November 4, 2007. A last-minute $21 million grant from the governor once again postponed the changes to January 20, 2008, this time including the elimination of 42 additional routes. However, the Illinois Legislature successfully passed HB656, a transit funding package, on January 17, 2008, providing the CTA with sufficient operating funds and preventing the service cuts.

The CTA also embarked on a $530 million project to rehabilitate and replace stations and infrastructure along the Brown Line. Seven of the stations included in the project, which was completed in December 2009, are shared with the Purple Line — along with associated trackage and signals extending from north of Belmont station to the Loop. Beginning April 2, 2007, operation on the Purple, Brown and Red lines between Addison and Armitage was restricted to three tracks, down from four, due to construction at Fullerton and Belmont stations.

Because of this construction work, fewer trains operated to downtown during the rush period. To prevent bottlenecks, only every other train went to the Loop during rush periods; all other trains operated only between Linden and Howard. Full service was restored by February 2010. In addition, the Purple Line Express's routing was changed to the Outer Loop, rather than the Inner Loop, to provide riders more access to stations between Belmont and the Loop. The line was rerouted back to the Inner Loop in Spring 2009.

=== Canceled project ===
One form of the CTA's Circle Line plan would call for a rerouting of the Purple Line Express service. Rather than continue to the Loop along with the Brown Line, trains would follow the Red Line after Belmont, making a stop at Fullerton and all current Red Line subway stops and terminate at a new station on Wentworth before heading north. However, this is a study and the final form of the Circle Line and its effects on current CTA rail service, The project was canceled.

== Destination signs ==
These are the destination signs used by the Purple Line since 1993, when they began displaying the route name on the line color background.

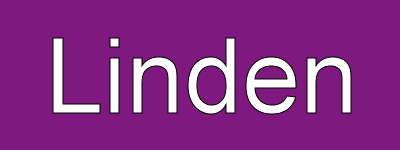
Linden destination sign

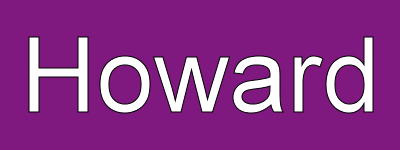
Howard destination sign, used on southbound shuttle trains terminating at Howard

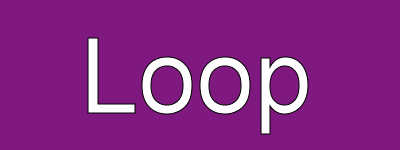
Loop destination sign, used on southbound Purple Line Express trains during weekday rush hours

== Station listing ==
Location	Station	Connections
Wilmette	Linden	Pace buses: 421, 422, 423
Evanston	Isabella	Closed July 16, 1973; demolished
Evanston	Central	CTA bus: 201
Evanston	Noyes	
Evanston	Foster	
Evanston	Davis	Metra: Union Pacific North (at Davis Street/Evanston); Pace Pulse: ■ Dempster Line; CTA buses: 93 201 206; Pace buses: 208, 213, 250
Evanston	Dempster	CTA bus: 206; Pace bus: 213
Evanston	Main	Metra: Union Pacific North (at Main Street/Evanston); CTA bus: 206; Pace bus: 213
Evanston	South Boulevard	CTA bus: 206; Pace bus: 213
Evanston	Calvary	Closed 1931; demolished and replaced by South Boulevard
Rogers Park	Howard	Off-peak and weekend terminal; Chicago "L": Red Yellow; CTA bus: 22 97 147 201 206; Pace bus: 213, 215, 290
Rogers Park	↓ Purple Line Express (weekday rush hours only) ↓	
Rogers Park	Morse	Service discontinued December 20, 1976
Rogers Park	Loyola	Service discontinued December 20, 1976
Uptown	Wilson	Chicago "L": Red; CTA buses: 36 78 151
Lakeview	Sheridan (weeknight Cubs games only)	Loop-bound service only; CTA buses: X9 80 151
Lakeview	Addison	Cubs service discontinued
Lakeview	Belmont	Chicago "L": Red Brown; CTA buses: 22 77
Lakeview	Wellington	
Lincoln Park	Diversey	CTA bus: 76
Lincoln Park	Fullerton	Chicago "L": Red Brown; CTA buses: 37 74
Lincoln Park	Armitage	CTA bus: 73
Near North Side	Sedgwick	CTA buses: N9 37 72
Near North Side	Chicago	CTA buses: 37 66
Near North Side	Merchandise Mart	Chicago "L": Brown; CTA buses: 37 125
The Loop	Clark/Lake (inner platform)	Chicago "L": Blue Brown Green Orange Pink; CTA buses: 22 24 134 135 136 156
The Loop	~~State/Lake~~	Temporarily closed for reconstruction until mid-2029
The Loop	Randolph/Wabash	Closed September 3, 2017; demolished and replaced by Washington/Wabash
The Loop	Washington/Wabash (inner platform)	Chicago "L": Red (at Lake) (Note: Temporarily, during the closure of State/Lake.); Metra: Metra Electric (at Millennium Station); NICTD: Lakeshore Corridor, Monon Corridor (at Millennium Station); CTA buses: N4 J14 20 56 60 N66 124 147 157
The Loop	Madison/Wabash	Closed March 16, 2015; demolished and replaced by Washington/Wabash
The Loop	Adams/Wabash (inner platform)	Chicago "L": Green Orange Brown Pink; CTA buses: 1 7 28 126 151
The Loop	Harold Washington Library (inner platform)	Chicago "L": Orange Brown Pink Red (at Jackson), Blue (at Jackson); CTA buses: 2 6 10 22 24 29 36 62 130 146 147 148
The Loop	LaSalle/Van Buren (inner platform)	Metra: Rock Island (at LaSalle Street); CTA buses: 22 24 36 130
The Loop	Quincy (inner platform)	Metra: BNSF, Heritage Corridor, Milwaukee District North, Milwaukee District West, North Central Service, SouthWest Service (at Union Station); Amtrak long-distance: California Zephyr, Cardinal, City of New Orleans, Empire Builder, Floridian, Lake Shore Limited, Southwest Chief, Texas Eagle (at Union Station); Amtrak intercity: Blue Water, Borealis, Hiawatha, Illini and Saluki, Illinois Zephyr and Carl Sandburg, Lincoln Service, Pere Marquette, Wolverine (at Union Station); CTA buses: 1 7 28 37 126 130 134 135 136 151 156
The Loop	Madison/Wells	Closed January 30, 1994; demolished and replaced by Washington/Wells
The Loop	Washington/Wells (inner platform)	Chicago "L": Brown Orange Pink; Metra: Union Pacific North, Union Pacific Northwest, Union Pacific West (at Ogilvie TC); CTA buses: J14 20 37 56 60 124 157
The Loop	Randolph/Wells	Closed July 17, 1995; partially demolished and replaced by Washington/Wells

Between Clark/Lake and Washington/Wells, Purple Line Express trains operate clockwise around the Inner Loop. After stopping at Washington/Wells, trains return to Merchandise Mart then make all stops back to Linden.

== General references ==
- Borzo, Greg (2007). The Chicago "L". Arcadia Publishing. ISBN 978-0-7385-5100-5.
