= Evanston, Illinois =

- City
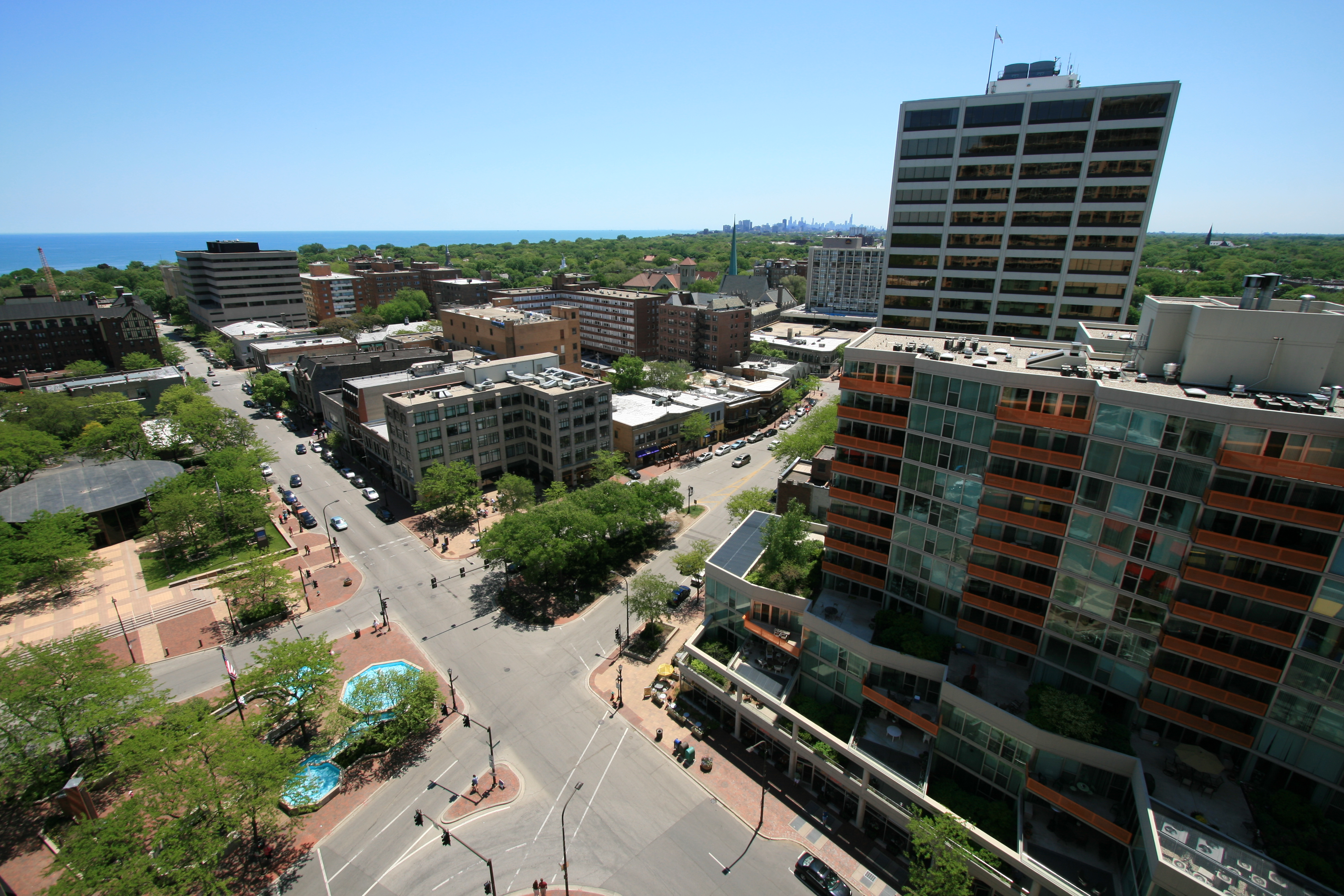
- View of downtown, at Sherman Avenue and Davis Street, looking south/south-east toward Chicago

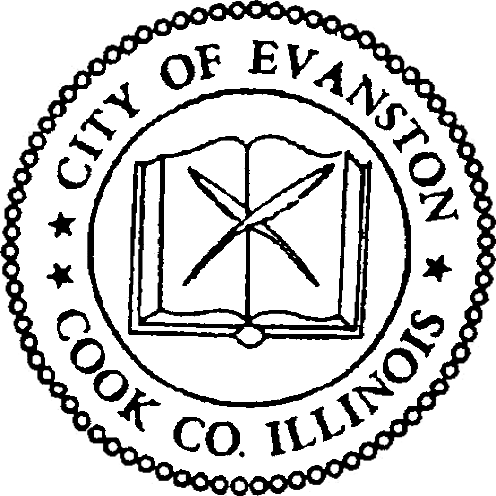
- Flag Seal Logo
- Interactive map of Evanston, Illinois
- Location within Greater Chicago Location within Illinois Location within the United States
- Coordinates: 42°2′50″N 87°41′6″W
- Country: United States
- State: Illinois
- County: Cook
- Incorporated: 1863; 163 years ago

Government
  - Type: Council–manager
  - Mayor: Jonathan Nieuwsma (acting) (D)
  - Budget: $304,494,806 (fiscal year: 2016)

Area
  - Total: 7.80 sq mi (20.21 km^{2})
  - Land: 7.78 sq mi (20.15 km^{2})
  - Water: 0.023 sq mi (0.06 km^{2}) 0.26%

Population (2020)
  - Total: 78,110
  - Estimate (2024): 76,006 ▼
  - Density: 10,040.5/sq mi (3,876.66/km^{2})
- 4.86% increase from 2010
- Demonym: Evanstonian

Standard of living (2011)
  - Per capita income: $40,732
  - Median home value: $340,700

Demographics (2010)
  - White: 65.6%
- ZIP Codes: 60201–60204, 60208–60209
- Area codes: 847 & 224
- FIPS code: 17-24582
- Website: cityofevanston.org

Evanston (Note: /ˈɛvənstən/ EV-ən-stən) is a city in Cook County, Illinois, United States. Evanston lies on Lake Michigan 12 miles (19 km) north of the Loop. A Chicago suburb, it is bordered by Wilmette to the north, Skokie to the west, Chicago to the south, and the lake to the east. Evanston had a population of 78,110 as of 2020.

Founded by Methodist business leaders in 1857, the city was incorporated in 1863. Evanston is home to Northwestern University, founded in 1851 before the city's incorporation, one of the world's leading research universities. Known for its ethnically diverse population, Evanston is heavily shaped by the influence of Chicago, externally, and Northwestern, internally. The city and the university share a historically complex long-standing relationship.

== History ==
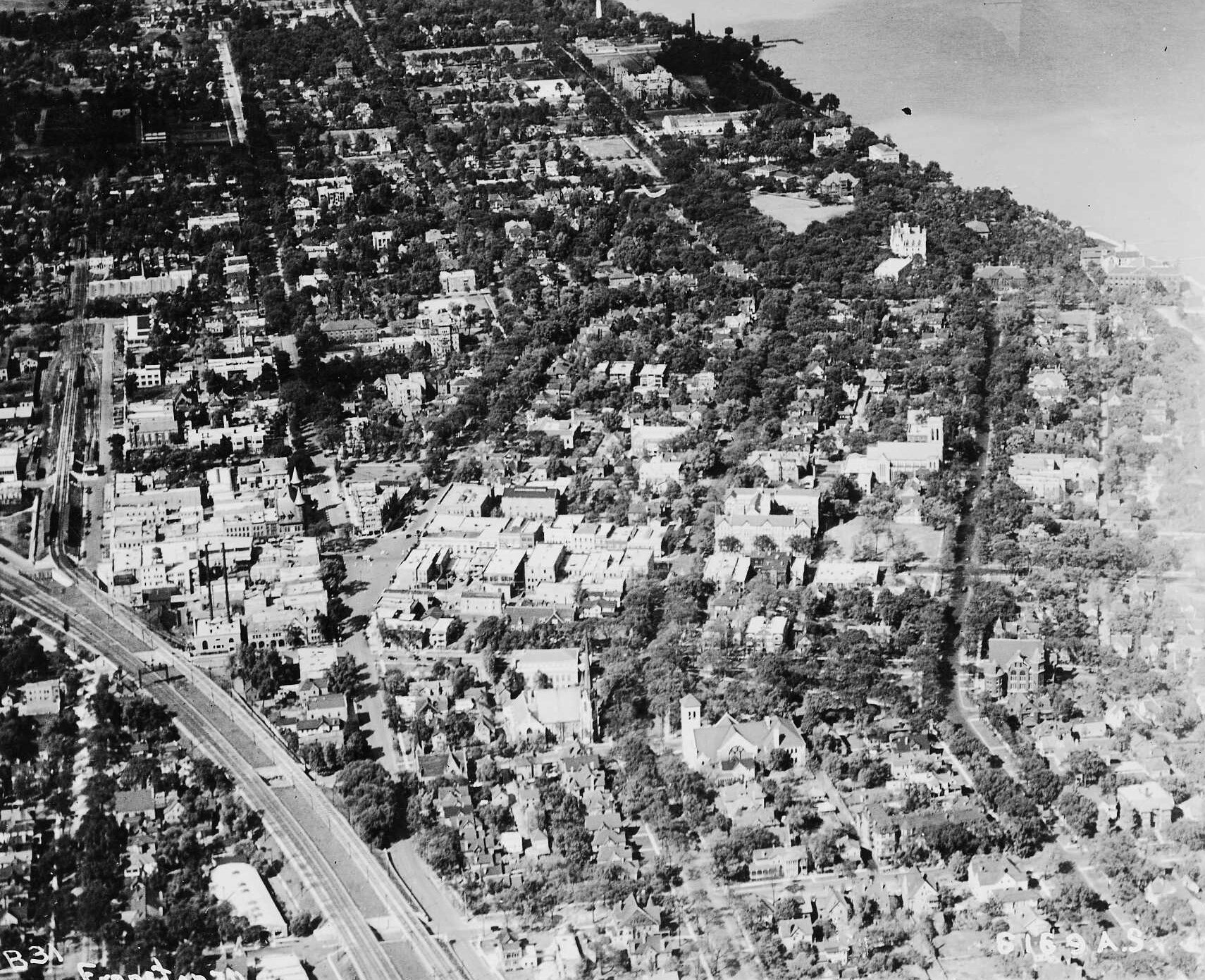
Evanston as seen in 1919

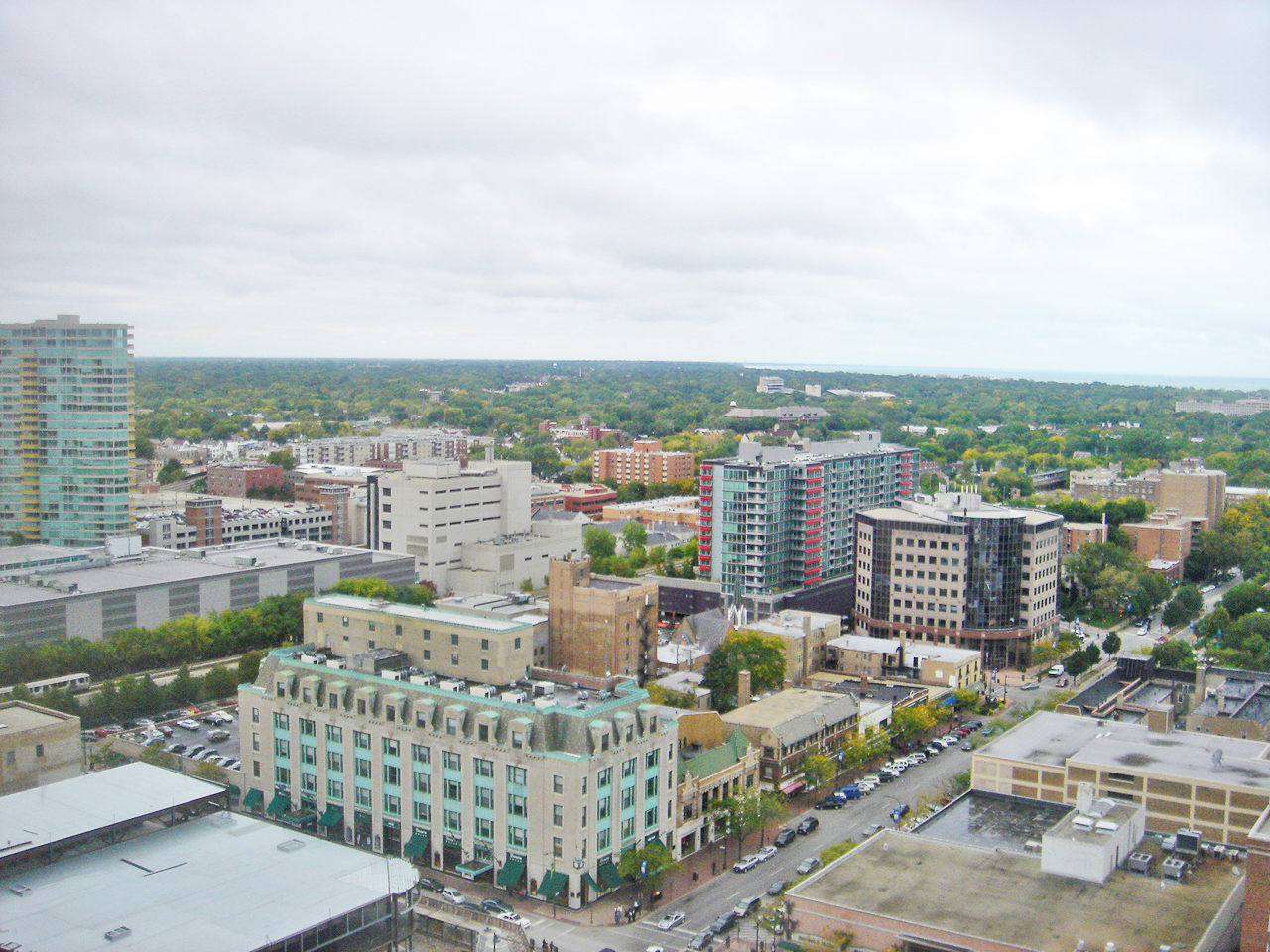
Downtown Evanston as seen in October 2005

Prior to the 1830s, the area now occupied by Evanston was mainly uninhabited, consisting largely of wetlands and swampy forest. However, Potawatomi Native Americans used trails along higher lying ridges that ran in a general north–south direction through the area, and had at least some semi-permanent settlements along the trails.

French explorers referred to the general area as "Grosse Pointe" after a point of land jutting into Lake Michigan about 13 miles (21 km) north of the mouth of the Chicago River. After the first non-Native Americans settled in the area in 1836, the names "Grosse Point Territory" and "Gross Point voting district" were used through the 1830s and 1840s, although the territory had no defined boundaries. The area remained only sparsely settled, supporting some farming and lumber activity on some of the higher ground, as well as a number of taverns or "hotels" along the ridge roads. Grosse Pointe itself steadily eroded into the lake during this period.

In 1850, a township called Ridgeville was organized, extending from Graceland Cemetery in Chicago to the southern edge of the Ouilmette Reservation, along what is now Central Street, and from Lake Michigan to Western Avenue in Chicago. The 1850 census shows a few hundred settlers in this township, and a post office with the name of Ridgeville was established at one of the taverns. However, no municipality yet existed.

In 1851, a group of Methodist business leaders founded Northwestern University and Garrett Biblical Institute. Unable to find available land on the north shore up to Lake Forest, the committee was ready to purchase farmland to the west of the city when Orrington Lunt insisted on one final visit to the present location. They chose a bluffed and wooded site along the lake as Northwestern's home, purchasing several hundred acres of land from John Foster, a Chicago farm owner. In 1854, the founders of Northwestern submitted to the county judge their plans for a city to be named Evanston after John Evans, one of their leaders. In 1857, the request was granted. The township of Evanston was split off from Ridgeville Township; at approximately the same time, that portion of Ridgeville south of Devon Avenue was organized as Lake View Township.

Evanston was formally incorporated as a town on December 29, 1863, but declined in 1869 to become a city despite the Illinois legislature passing a bill for that purpose. Evanston expanded after the Civil War with the annexation of the village of North Evanston. Finally, in early 1892, following the annexation of the village of South Evanston, voters elected to organize as a city. The 1892 boundaries are largely those that exist today.

In the late summer of 1912, the beaches in Evanston were infested with thousands of rats. The rats had burrowed into the sides of the lake banks, dug holes in the sand, and hid under piers. Most of the rats were extremely large and savage, attacking people who disturbed them. Local bathers struggled to navigate the shores, constantly stepping into the hidden rat holes. John Morgan, the manager of an extermination company tasked with removing the vermin, stated that it was not uncommon for rats to live around the lake's shore because of the quantity of dead fish that was cast to shore by the waves. The weather also played a role since the close proximity to the beaches allowed the rats to swim out in the water during the hot summer.

During the 1960s, Northwestern University changed the city's shoreline by adding a 74-acre (30 ha) lakefill.

In 1939, Evanston hosted the first NCAA basketball championship final at Northwestern University's Patten Gymnasium.

In August 1954, Evanston hosted the second assembly of the World Council of Churches, still the only WCC assembly to have been held in the United States. President Dwight Eisenhower welcomed the delegates, and Dag Hammarskjöld, secretary-general of the United Nations, delivered an important address entitled "An instrument of faith".

Evanston first received power in April 1893. Many people lined the streets on Emerson St. where the first appearance of street lights were lined and turned on. Today, the city is home to Northwestern University, Music Institute of Chicago, and other educational institutions, as well as headquarters of Alpha Phi International women's fraternity, Rotary International, the National Merit Scholarship Corporation, the National Lekotek Center, the Sigma Alpha Epsilon fraternity, the Sigma Chi fraternity and the Woman's Christian Temperance Union (WCTU). Evanston's 117 years as a "dry" town are often attributed to the WCTU, but the ban actually dates to a clause in Northwestern University's charter, which stated "no spiritous, vinous, or fermented liquors shall be sold under license, or otherwise, within four miles" of the school. The WCTU did campaign to keep the ban in place, and it lasted until 1972.

Evanston is the birthplace of Tinkertoys, and is one of the locations claiming to have originated the ice cream sundae. Evanston was the home of the Clayton Mark and Company, which for many years supplied the most jobs.

Evanston was a dry community from 1858 until 1972, when the City Council voted to allow restaurants and hotels to serve liquor on their premises. In 1984, the Council voted to allow retail liquor outlets within the city limits.

In March 2021, Evanston became the first city in the United States to pay reparations to African American residents (or their descendants) who were victims of unfair housing practices between 1919 and 1969. The city council of the city voted 8 to 1 to approve the reparations which consisted of a $25,000 payment to African American households that can be used as down payments on their homes, house payments or for home repairs. This was the initial payment, with plans to distribute $10 million in reparations payments to Black residents over the next decade. In 2024, a conservative legal group filed a federal lawsuit stating the reparation program's race-based eligibility criteria violates the Equal Protection Clause of the Fourteenth Amendment in the U.S. Constitution. The city attempted to legally stop the lawsuit but in 2026 a federal judge stated the lawsuit against the city was allowed to proceed.

In August 2021, Evanston became one of the first cities to approve a pilot project providing a guaranteed income to select residents, drawing upon a combination of public funds and a partnership with Northwestern University.

== Geography ==
According to the 2021 census gazetteer files, Evanston has a total area of 7.80 square miles (20.20 km^{2}), of which 7.78 square miles (20.15 km^{2}) (or 99.72%) is land and 0.02 square miles (0.05 km^{2}) (or 0.28%) is water.

=== Climate Action Plan ===
In October 2006, the city voted to sign the United States Conference of Mayors Climate Protection Agreement, and a number of citizen task forces convened to develop a plan to reduce the city's carbon footprint. The Evanston Climate Action Plan ("ECAP"), accepted by the City Council in November 2008, suggested over 200 strategies to make Evanston more sustainable, principally by reducing carbon emissions associated with transportation, buildings, energy sources, waste, and food production. In June 2011, the United States Conference of Mayors awarded Evanston first place in the small city category of the Mayors' Climate Protection Awards, based largely on the city's use of the ECAP, which the city asserts has reduced emissions by 24,000 metric tons per year. On September 15, 2011, Wal-Mart presented Mayor Tisdahl with a $15,000 award in recognition of the honor, which the mayor donated to Citizens' Greener Evanston.

=== Climate information ===
Evanston is in the Hot-summer humid continental climate, or Köppen Dfa zone. The zone includes four distinct seasons. Winter is cold with snow. Spring warms up with precipitation and storms. Summer has high precipitation and storms. Fall cools down.

Climate data for Evanston, IL: Precipitation normals
Month	Jan	Feb	Mar	Apr	May	Jun	Jul	Aug	Sep	Oct	Nov	Dec	Year
Average precipitation inches (mm)	2.31 (59)	2.15 (55)	2.30 (58)	3.92 (100)	4.71 (120)	4.51 (115)	3.54 (90)	4.47 (114)	3.55 (90)	3.77 (96)	2.67 (68)	2.42 (61)	40.32 (1,026)
Source: NOAA

== Demographics ==
Historical population
Census	Pop.	Note	%±
1880	4,400		—
1890	9,000		104.5%
1900	19,259		114.0%
1910	24,978		29.7%
1920	37,234		49.1%
1930	63,338		70.1%
1940	65,389		3.2%
1950	73,641		12.6%
1960	79,263		7.6%
1970	79,808		0.7%
1980	73,706		−7.6%
1990	73,233		−0.6%
2000	74,239		1.4%
2010	74,486		0.3%
2020	78,110		4.9%
U.S. Decennial Census; 2010 2020

=== Racial and ethnic composition ===
Evanston city, Illinois – racial and ethnic composition Note: the US Census treats Hispanic/Latino as an ethnic category. This table excludes Latinos from the racial categories and assigns them to a separate category. Hispanics/Latinos may be of any race.
Race / ethnicity (NH = Non-Hispanic)	Pop. 2000	Pop. 2010	Pop. 2020	% 2000	% 2010	% 2020
White alone (NH)	46,444	45,551	44,534	62.56%	61.15%	57.01%
Black or African American alone (NH)	16,449	13,139	12,329	22.16%	17.64%	15.78%
Native American or Alaska Native alone (NH)	92	96	99	0.12%	0.13%	0.13%
Asian alone (NH)	4,505	6,355	7,701	6.07%	8.53%	9.86%
Pacific Islander alone (NH)	52	13	25	0.07%	0.02%	0.03%
Other race alone (NH)	282	280	479	0.38%	0.38%	0.61%
Mixed race or multiracial (NH)	1,876	2,313	4,165	2.53%	3.11%	5.33%
Hispanic or Latino (any race)	4,539	6,739	8,778	6.11%	9.05%	11.24%
Total	74,239	74,486	78,110	100.00%	100.00%	100.00%

=== 2020 census ===
As of the 2020 census, Evanston had a population of 78,110, 31,425 households, and 15,184 families. The population density was 10,012.82 inhabitants per square mile (3,865.97/km^{2}).

The city had 34,462 housing units at an average density of 4,417.64 per square mile (1,705.66/km^{2}); 8.8% of units were vacant. The homeowner vacancy rate was 1.7% and the rental vacancy rate was 9.6%.

The median age was 36.5 years. 18.4% of residents were under the age of 18 and 16.5% were 65 years of age or older. For every 100 females there were 91.9 males, and for every 100 females age 18 and over there were 88.3 males age 18 and over.

Of the 31,425 households, 25.4% had children under the age of 18 living in them. Of all households, 40.3% were married-couple households, 20.9% were households with a male householder and no spouse or partner present, and 33.4% were households with a female householder and no spouse or partner present. About 36.7% of all households were made up of individuals and 12.6% had someone living alone who was 65 years of age or older.

100.0% of residents lived in urban areas, while 0.0% lived in rural areas.

Racial composition as of the 2020 census
Race	Number	Percent
White	46,133	59.1%
Black or African American	12,542	16.1%
American Indian and Alaska Native	523	0.7%
Asian	7,751	9.9%
Native Hawaiian and Other Pacific Islander	43	0.1%
Some other race	3,482	4.5%
Two or more races	7,636	9.8%
Hispanic or Latino (of any race)	8,778	11.2%

== Economy ==
12.3% of Evanston's 9,259 businesses were Black-owned in 2012, and 24% of the city's 2,041 employer firms were women-owned in 2017.

=== Top employers ===
As of 2015, according to the State of Illinois Dept Commerce and Economic Opportunity and Individual Employers, the top employers in the city were:

#	Employer	# of employees
1	Northwestern University	9,471
2	NorthShore University HealthSystem	3,727
3	Evanston-Skokie School District 65	1,600
4	Saint Francis Hospital	1,272
5	City of Evanston	918
6	Presbyterian Homes	602
7	Rotary International	525
8	Evanston Township High School District 202	520
9	Jewel-Osco	480
10	C.E. Niehoff & Co.	450

=== Notable employers ===
- Magnetar Capital, a hedge fund based in Evanston
- ZS Associates, a consulting firm
- Clayton Mark and Company, steel product manufacturer
- Legacy.com, online memorial provider

== Arts and culture ==
=== Points of interest ===
- Evanston Art Center
- Evanston Township High School
- Frances Willard House
- Free School of Evanston
- Grosse Point Lighthouse
- Harley Clarke Mansion
- Ladd Arboretum
- Lighthouse Beach
- Mount Trashmore
- North Shore Channel Trail
- Northwestern University
- Ryan Field

=== Commercial districts ===
Once the home of one of the first Marshall Field's and Sears stores in suburbia, Evanston has several shopping areas:

- Downtown - centered on the Davis Street Metra and "L" stops, Evanston's downtown adjoins Northwestern University. There are over 300 businesses, several high-rise office and residential buildings, three traditional low-rise shopping areas and over 85 restaurants. It is roughly bordered by Emerson Street to the north, Dempster Street to the south, Ridge Avenue to the west, and the Lake to the east.
- Central Street - actually several shopping districts linked along the northernmost of the city's principal east–west arteries, with the most active clustered around the Central Street Metra station and characterized by specialty shops and restaurants.
- Dempster Street - just off the Dempster "L" stop; over 60 shops.
- Main Street - approximately three blocks of mostly independent boutiques and restaurants abutting both a CTA and Metra stop. The neighborhood is also home to the Evanston Arts Depot.
- Howard Street - Howard Street forms the southern border between Evanston and the City of Chicago. The Howard Street CTA station is a transfer point between the Red, Purple, and Yellow line trains as well as several CTA and PACE bus routes.
- Chicago Avenue - not a separate shopping district per se, this extension of what is called Clark Street in Chicago runs parallel to the rail lines and is the principal north–south artery in Evanston from Howard Street north to its terminus at Northwestern University. Chicago Avenue connects the Main Street, Dempster Street, and Downtown shopping districts.
- Noyes - Bordering the Noyes "L" stop with around a dozen restaurants, dry-cleaners and convenience stores.

=== Library ===
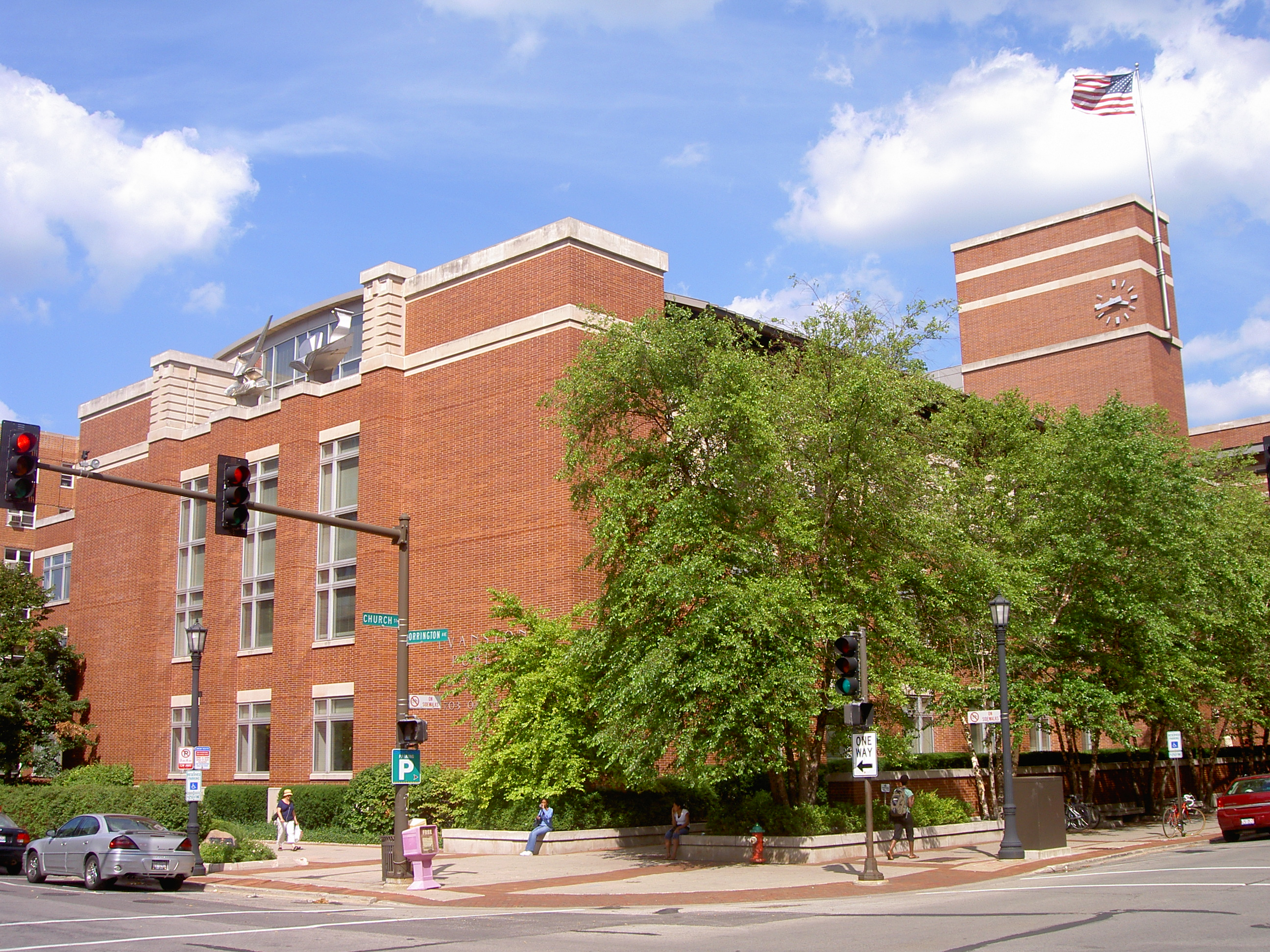
Main Evanston Public Library

The Evanston Public Library was established in 1873, and has a satellite branch at the Robert Crown Community Center. The North and South Branches of the Evanston Library were closed in 2021.

== Government ==
The City of Evanston became sister cities with the Dnieprovsky District of the City of Kyiv, Ukraine, in 1988, and sister cities with Belize City, Belize, in 1992.

Evanston has a council-manager system of government and is divided into nine wards, each of which is represented by an Alderman, or member of the Evanston City Council.

Evanston was heavily Republican in voter identification from the time of the Civil War up to the 1960s. Richard Nixon carried it in the 1968 presidential election. The city began trending Democratic in the 1960s, though it never elected a Democratic mayor until 1993.

In the 2012 presidential election, Democratic incumbent Barack Obama won 85% of Evanston's vote, compared to 13% for Republican challenger Mitt Romney. In the 2016 Democratic primary, Hillary Clinton received 54% of the votes of Evanston Democrats to Bernie Sanders' 45%. During that year's general election, Clinton won 87% of the vote in Evanston, while Republican Donald Trump received just 7%. Evanston's turnout for presidential elections has grown steadily since 2004, with 80% of registered voters voting in the 2016 general election.

In the 2020 presidential election, Democrat Joe Biden received 90% of the vote, while Republican Donald Trump received only 7%. In the 2024 presidential election, Kamala Harris received a greater percentage of the vote in Evanston than in any other Cook County township, leading Trump by a margin of 91%-8%, barely edging Oak Park Township's margin of 90%-9%.

== Education ==
=== Public schools ===
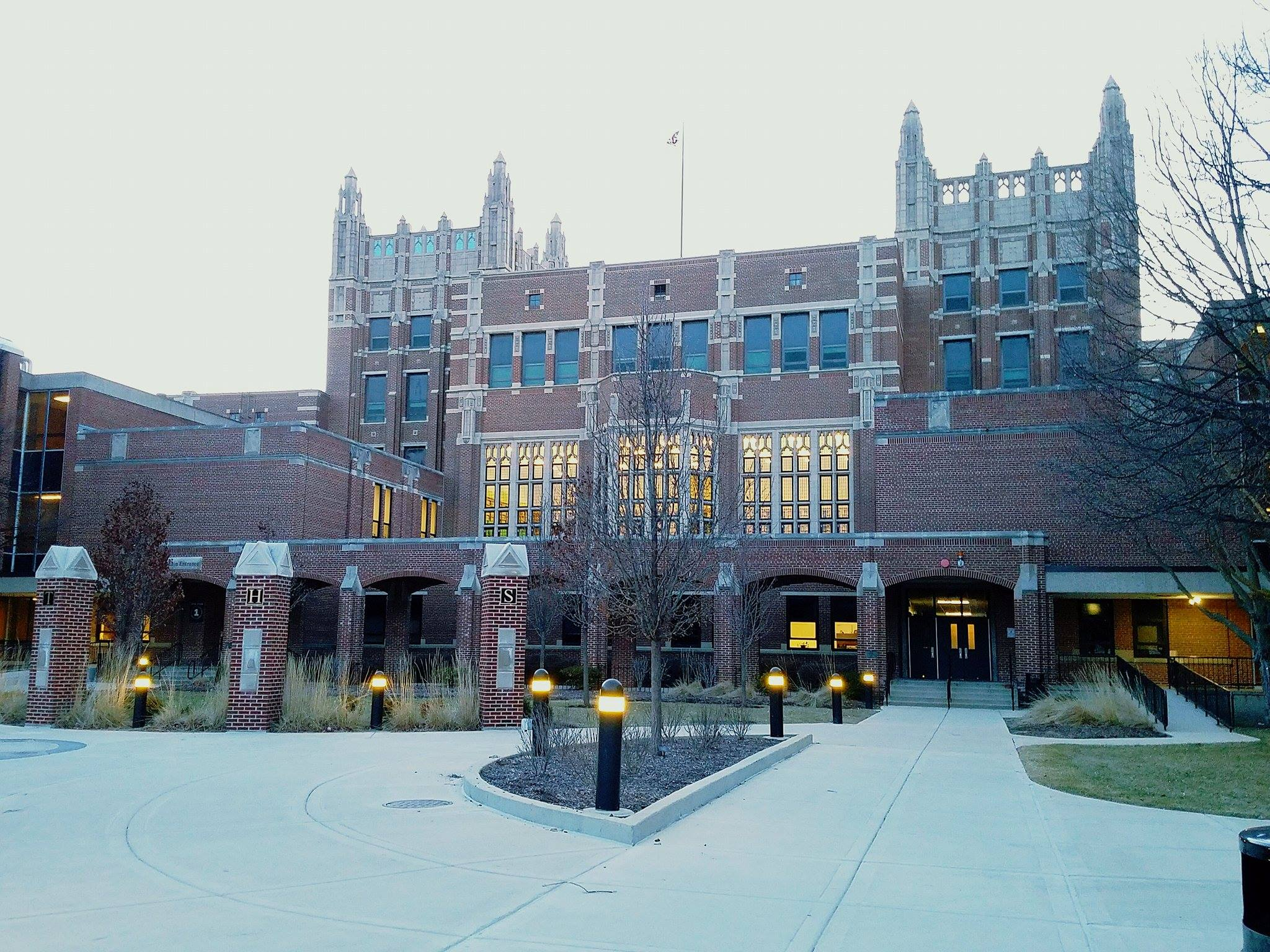
Evanston Township High School

All of Evanston and a small part of Skokie are within the Evanston-Skokie Community Consolidated School District 65 and the Evanston Township High School District 202. The latter school district has a single high school, Evanston Township High School, with an enrollment of just over 4,000, covering grades 9 through 12. The former district provides primary education from pre-kindergarten through grade 8. That district has ten elementary schools (kindergarten through fifth grade), three middle schools (grades 6 through 8), two magnet schools (K through 8), two special schools or centers, and an early childhood school.

=== Private schools ===
Private schools located in Evanston, Illinois include:

- Beacon Academy, a Montessori high school
- Chiaravalle Montessori School, a Montessori school for children ages 2–14
- Midwest Montessori School
- Pope John XXIII School, a Catholic school serving children pre-kindergarten through eighth grade. The school dates back to 1886 with the establishment of separate schools serving St. Nicholas and St. Mary's parishes in Evanston. The original St. Nicholas School was in the building now called the Annex. The main school building was built in 1954. In 1986 the two parish schools consolidated and the new school was renamed Pope John XXIII School. In 2023, the St. Nicholas parish was renamed to St. John XXIII parish and the St. Mary's parish was closed due to funding issues.
- St. Athanasius School, a Catholic school for children from junior kindergarten through eighth grade. "St. A's" is a popular shortened nickname for the school and it is part of the St. Athanasius parish in Northwest Evanston. The teams are known as the RedHawks. The school focuses on three key themes; Love, Learn, Lead.

Closed

- Roycemore School

=== Universities ===
In 2006, National-Louis University closed its former main site, which had 6.5 acres (2.6 ha) of land, with about 33% in Evanston; the majority of the land was in Wilmette.

Founded in 1855, Evanston is home to Northwestern University. Located along Lake Michigan, Northwestern's campus spans 240 acres with an estimated 250 buildings. Since 1908, Kellogg School of Management as well as Garrett-Evangelical Theological Seminary (1853) have institutions, of which both share the campus with Northwestern.

Have Dreams is a work training graduate school in Evanston.

=== Former schools ===
- Illinois Industrial School for Girls

== Media ==
- The Daily Northwestern, the student newspaper at Northwestern University
- The Evanstonian, the student newspaper at Evanston Township High School
- The Evanston Review, subscription weekly newspaper, part of Pioneer Press
- The Evanston RoundTable, a free online news site
- The Evanston Sentinel, a free weekly African-American newspaper
- Evanston Now, an online newspaper and community website

=== Use as film location ===
Evanston's variety of housing and commercial districts, combined with easy access to Chicago, make it a popular filming location. Evanston as of December 2008 is listed as a filming location for 65 different films, notably those of John Hughes. Much of the 1984 film Sixteen Candles was filmed in and around Evanston, the 1988 film She's Having a Baby, as was the 1989 film Uncle Buck, the 1993 film Dennis the Menace, and the 1997 film Home Alone 3. A number of scenes from the 1986 Garry Marshall film Nothing in Common were filmed on the Northwestern University campus and Evanston's lakeshore. Although not filmed there, the 2004 film Mean Girls is set in the Chicago suburbs, and makes several references to the area. The movie's screenwriter and co-star, Tina Fey, had worked at the Evanston YMCA when starting her comedy career. In the 2003 film Cheaper by the Dozen, the family moves to Evanston. Additionally, 1993 film Rookie of the Year, starring Gary Busey and Thomas Ian Nicholas, was partially shot at Haven Middle School. The 2015 ABC Family reality series Becoming Us was filmed in Evanston.

== Infrastructure ==
=== Transportation ===
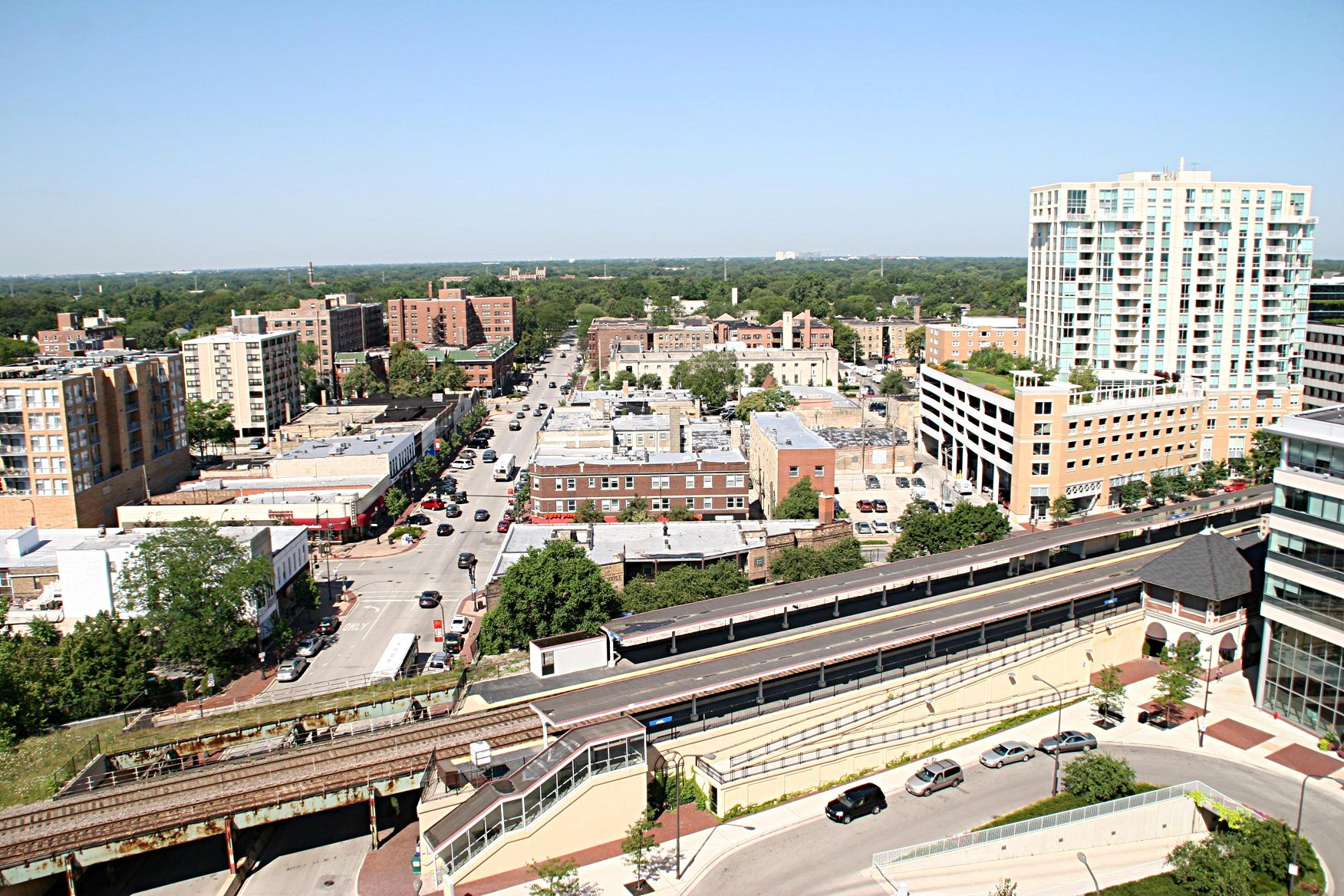
Shops along Davis Street, looking west, August 2006. The Davis Street Metra stop is visible in the lower half of the photograph.

Evanston's growth occurred largely because of its accessibility from Chicago by rail. The Northwestern founders did not finalize their commitment to siting the university there until they were assured the Chicago & Milwaukee Railway line would run there. C&M trains began stopping in Evanston in 1855. Evanston later experienced rapid growth as one of the first streetcar suburbs. The North Shore Line, the interurban railroad that gave the area its nickname, ran through Evanston and continued to Waukegan and Milwaukee.

The city is still connected to Chicago by rail transit. The CTA's Purple Line, part of the Chicago 'L' system, runs through Evanston. From its terminal at Howard in Chicago, the line heads north to the South Boulevard, Main, Dempster, Davis, Foster, Noyes, and Central stations, before terminating at the Linden station in Wilmette. During weekday rush hours, the Purple Line extends another 10.3 miles (16.6 km) south on the North Side Main Line from Howard to downtown Chicago running express from Howard to Belmont, with a single stop at Wilson, and then making all local stops from Belmont to the Loop. The express service is known as the Purple Line Express (or the Evanston Express). Metra's Union Pacific North Line also serves Evanston, with stations at Main Street, Davis Street and Central Street, the first two being adjacent to Purple Line stations. The CTA's Yellow Line also runs through the city, though it does not stop there. Evanston is served by six CTA bus routes as well as four Pace bus routes.

Automobile routes from Chicago to Evanston include Lake Shore Drive, the Edens Expressway (I-94), and McCormick Boulevard, although the first two of those do not extend to Evanston itself and require driving through Rogers Park (via Sheridan Road or Ridge Avenue) and Skokie, respectively. The main routes from the north are the Edens, Green Bay Road, and Sheridan Road. Active modes of transportation include miles of sidewalks and bicycle lanes.

=== Health care ===
Two hospitals are located within Evanston's city limits:

- Evanston Hospital, part of NorthShore University HealthSystem
- Ascension Saint Francis Hospital Evanston, part of Ascension

== University relations ==
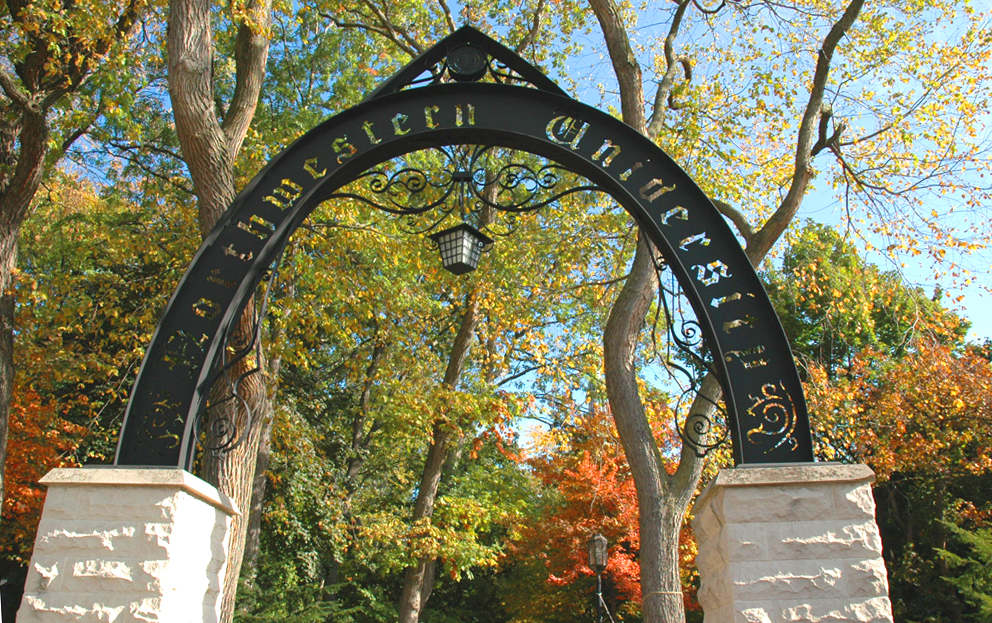
"The Arch", the main entrance to the Evanston campus of Northwestern University

A perennial debate in Evanston is the issue of Northwestern University's status as a tax-exempt institution. In the founding charter of Northwestern University, signed in 1851, the state granted the school an exemption from paying property taxes, and unlike other well-off private universities with statutory exemptions, it provides its own police services, but not firefighter/paramedic services. It pays water, sewer, communications, real property transfer taxes, and building permit fees, but not property taxes. Northwestern does not make Payments in Lieu of Taxes for the real estate it removes from property tax rolls.

Its backers, like former Evanston mayor and Northwestern alumna Lorraine H. Morton, contend that the benefits of having an elite research institution justify Northwestern's tax status. These supporters highlight the fact that Northwestern University is the largest employer in Evanston, and that its students and faculty constitute a large consumer base for Evanston businesses. A non-binding advisory referendum was put on the 2000 Illinois primary election ballot proposing the university pay a fair share of the cost of services provided by the city. Dubbed by supporters as the "Fair Share Initiative," it passed with 83.5% of the vote. The council rejected to place a similar referendum on the November ballot in July 2026.

The controversy was revived in 2005 when the university purchased an eight-story office building downtown, removing it from the tax rolls. But, during the tenure of Elizabeth Tisdahl as mayor, relationships between the university and Evanston improved. Upon arriving at Northwestern in 2009, President Morton O. Schapiro forged a strong working relationship with Tisdahl; in 2015, the two announced that Northwestern would begin to donate $1 million annually to benefit city services and programs.

== Nicknames ==
- Early after its founding, because of its strong Methodist influence, and its attempt to impose moral rigor, Evanston was called "Heavenston".
- In the early 20th century Evanston was called "The City of Churches".
- The varied works of numerous prominent architects, and many prominent mansions, especially near the lakefront, gave the town by the 1920s the sobriquet "The City of Homes", a fact often touted by local real estate agents. Use of the phrase has been attributed to a 1924 speech at the local Kiwanis club.
- Since the late 20th century, because of Evanston's activism and often left-of-center politics, it is sometimes humorously (or sarcastically) referred to as "The People's Republic of Evanston".

== See also ==
- National Register of Historic Places listings in Evanston, Illinois
