= Church station (North Shore Line) =

North Shore Line station

Church Street

General information
- Location: 901 Church Street; Evanston, Illinois 60201
- Coordinates: 42.04856°N 87.6835313°W
- System: North Shore Line interurban station
- Owner: North Shore Line
- Line: Shore Line Route
- Platforms: 2 side platforms (elevated); 1 island platform (at-grade)
- Tracks: 2 (elevated through); 2 (at-grade terminal)
- Connections: Chicago "L" at Davis; C&NW North Line at Evanston Davis Street

Construction
- Structure type: Elevated (1919–1955); At-grade (1899–1928)

History
- Opened: July 16, 1899; 127 years ago
- Closed: July 24, 1955; 71 years ago
- Rebuilt: 1908–1910; 116 years ago 1919; 107 years ago c. 1922–1923; 103 years ago

Services
Preceding station	Chicago North Shore and Milwaukee Railroad	Following station
Foster toward Milwaukee	North Shore Line Shore Line Route	Howard Street toward Roosevelt Road
Track layout
Location

Church Street was an interurban station on the North Shore Line between 1899 and 1955 in downtown Evanston, Illinois. Originally opened as the railroad's southernmost terminal, the station was the city's principal stop and was sometimes referred to as Evanston, despite trains serving three more stops in the city.

== History and design ==
During the late 1890s the Chicago and Milwaukee Electric Railroad (better known as the North Shore Line) sought to extend their operations from Waukegan, Illinois to Chicago. An agreement was reached with the Milwaukee Road for use of their Evanston Division as far south as Church Street. In order to provide service to downtown Chicago, the Chicago and Milwaukee Electric offered joint tickets with the Milwaukee Road and the electric line terminated in the street in front of the railroad's main Evanston station at Davis Street, offering a direct connection with steam-hauled trains to Chicago Union Station. A trial run of the new electric line was made on July 14, 1899, and public service commenced two days later. By August the interurban line, known as the Shore Line Route, began operating the entire length to Waukegan.

In 1908 the Northwestern Elevated took over passenger operations from the Milwaukee Road to Central Street; the line had been operating at a loss since before the North Shore began utilizing it. Between 1908 and 1910, the Northwestern "L" converted the line for rapid transit service, elevating and electrifying it, between the city limits and the interlocking with the North Shore Line at University Place. This required the removal of the station track in front of Davis station, although crossing the street for "L" service to the Loop nullified any inconvenience. A modest wood-frame station building and stub track terminal was constructed east of the mainline at the corner of Church Street and Benson Avenue.

=== Direct service to Chicago ===
In early 1919 an agreement was made between the North Shore Line, Northwestern "L", and Milwaukee Road for the long sought-after service into downtown Chicago. New platforms on the elevated embankment were constructed to allow passengers to access North Shore trains since the at-grade terminal could not be reconfigured for through service. Platforms were low-level to allow freight trains to pass without gauntlet tracks, although this meant "L" trains could not serve the station. Direct service from Milwaukee to the Chicago Loop was inaugurated August 6.

Increased traffic on the North Shore Line kicked off a series of station improvements in the early 1920s. Stucco additions to Church Street's station building gave the impression of a more substantial structure with increased floor area and an updated ornamental Mediterranean Revival facade.

The next change to the station would occur in 1928 when Chicago Rapid Transit, the Northwestern's successor, began elevating the remainder of the line from University Place to the North Shore Channel. Terminating service to the at-grade platforms was abandoned as tracks were disconnected from the mainline during construction. The station building remained in use for ticketing and waiting.

=== Closure ===
After World War II, the North Shore Line had been petitioning to end service on their Shore Line Route, citing slow, unreliable service and safety concerns from extensive street running. Most traffic had shifted to the high-speed Skokie Valley Route after its completion in 1926, exasperated by a sharp decline in ridership after the war. By 1948, the North Shore was losing money on the route. Abandonment of the line was granted by the Illinois Commerce Commission at the end of 1954, and the last train served the station July 24, 1955.

== See also ==
- Central, Noyes, and Foster stations – Evanston's other three North Shore Line stations
- Evanston Davis Street station – Mainline suburban station in the vicinity
