= Foster station =

Chicago "L" station

Foster 2000N 900W
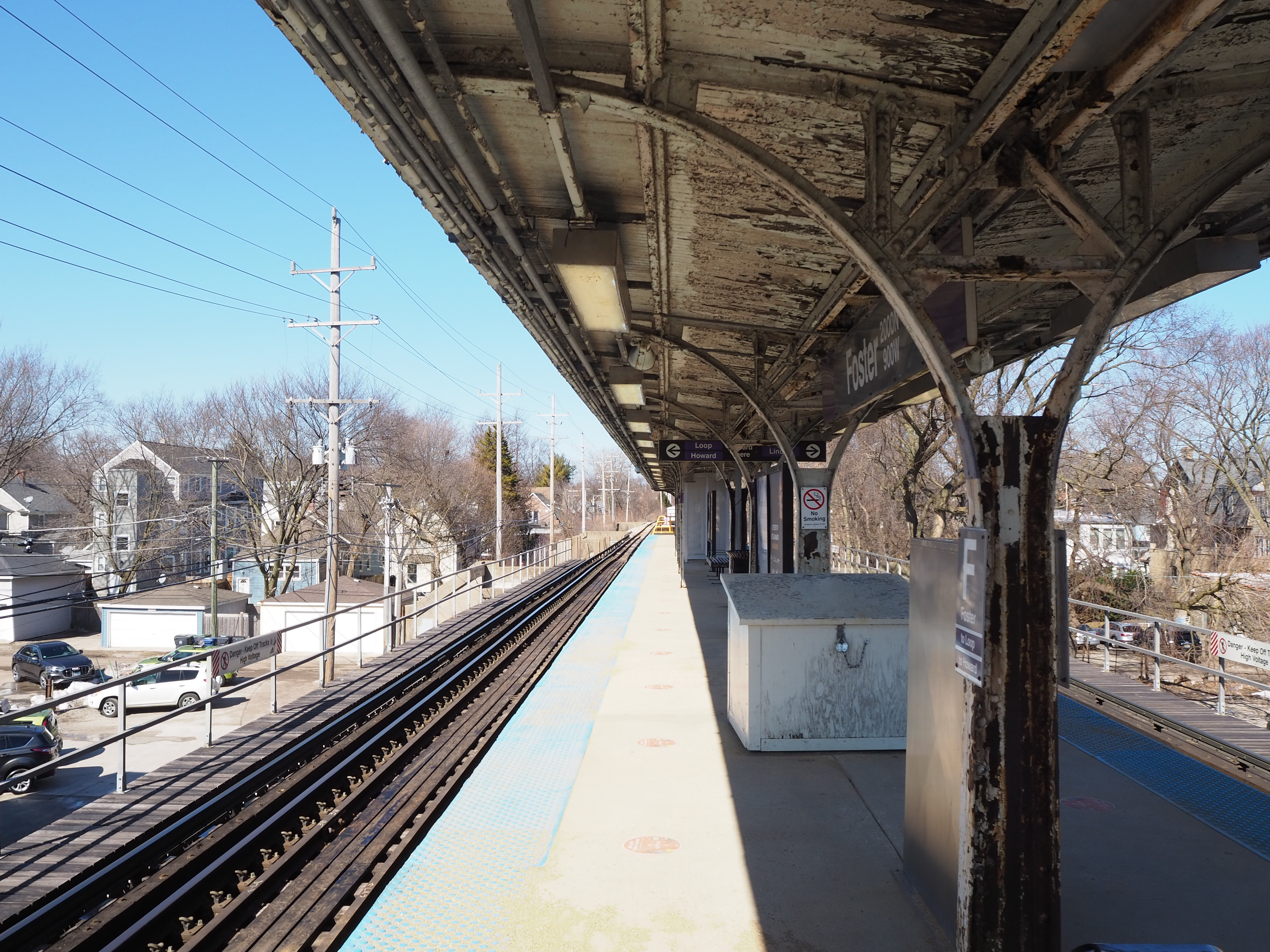

General information
- Location: 900 Foster Street; Evanston, Illinois 60201
- Coordinates: 42.054136°N 87.683604°W
- Owner: Chicago Transit Authority
- Line: Evanston Branch
- Platforms: 1 island platform
- Tracks: 2

Construction
- Structure type: Elevated
- Accessible: No

History
- Opened: January 6, 1909; 117 years ago
- Rebuilt: 1931; 95 years ago

Passengers
- 2025: 145,144 ▲7.2% (CTA)

Services
Preceding station	Chicago "L"	Following station
Noyes toward Linden	Purple Line	Davis toward Howard or Loop (Clark/Lake)
Former services
Preceding station	Chicago North Shore and Milwaukee Railroad	Following station
Noyes toward North Chicago Junction	North Shore Line Shore Line Route	Church toward Roosevelt Road
Track layout
Location

Foster is a station on the Chicago Transit Authority's 'L' system, on the Purple Line in Evanston, Illinois. It is located at 900 Foster Street (directional coordinates 2000 north, 900 west), just a few blocks west of Northwestern University's Evanston campus.

== History ==
=== Structure ===
Like the rest of the 'L' tracks north of the Wilson station, Foster is elevated on a solid fill embankment, unlike the steel structure commonly associated with the 'L'. It lacks a formal station house; two staircases on the south side of Foster Street lead up to a small area containing a customer assistant's booth, a farecard vending machine, and two turnstiles. The island platform is composed of concrete and stretches north from the station entrance, covered by a canopy its entire length. Southbound trains stop on the west side of the platform, while northbound trains stop at the east part. The platform can only accommodate six-car trains because the north tip of the platform has been removed, although its framing and canopy are still in place.

=== Former service ===
Foster was served by trains of the Chicago North Shore and Milwaukee Railroad on the Shore Line Route. Like Noyes and Central, Foster had an additional side platform to the west of the southbound track for exclusive use of the North Shore Line, to prevent disembarking customers from transferring to 'L' trains for free. The platform was removed sometime after the North Shore Line ceased operations over this section of the rapid transit system in 1955, but its concrete footings can still be seen opposite the current platform north of Foster Street.

=== Modernization ===
Closure of the Foster station (along with South Boulevard) was proposed in three of the CTA's six potential options for the renovation of the Purple Line and northern section of the Red Line.
