= Chicago North Shore and Milwaukee Railroad =

Former interurban railroad line between the Chicago Loop and downtown Milwaukee

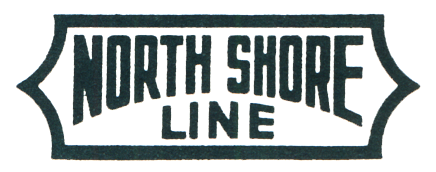

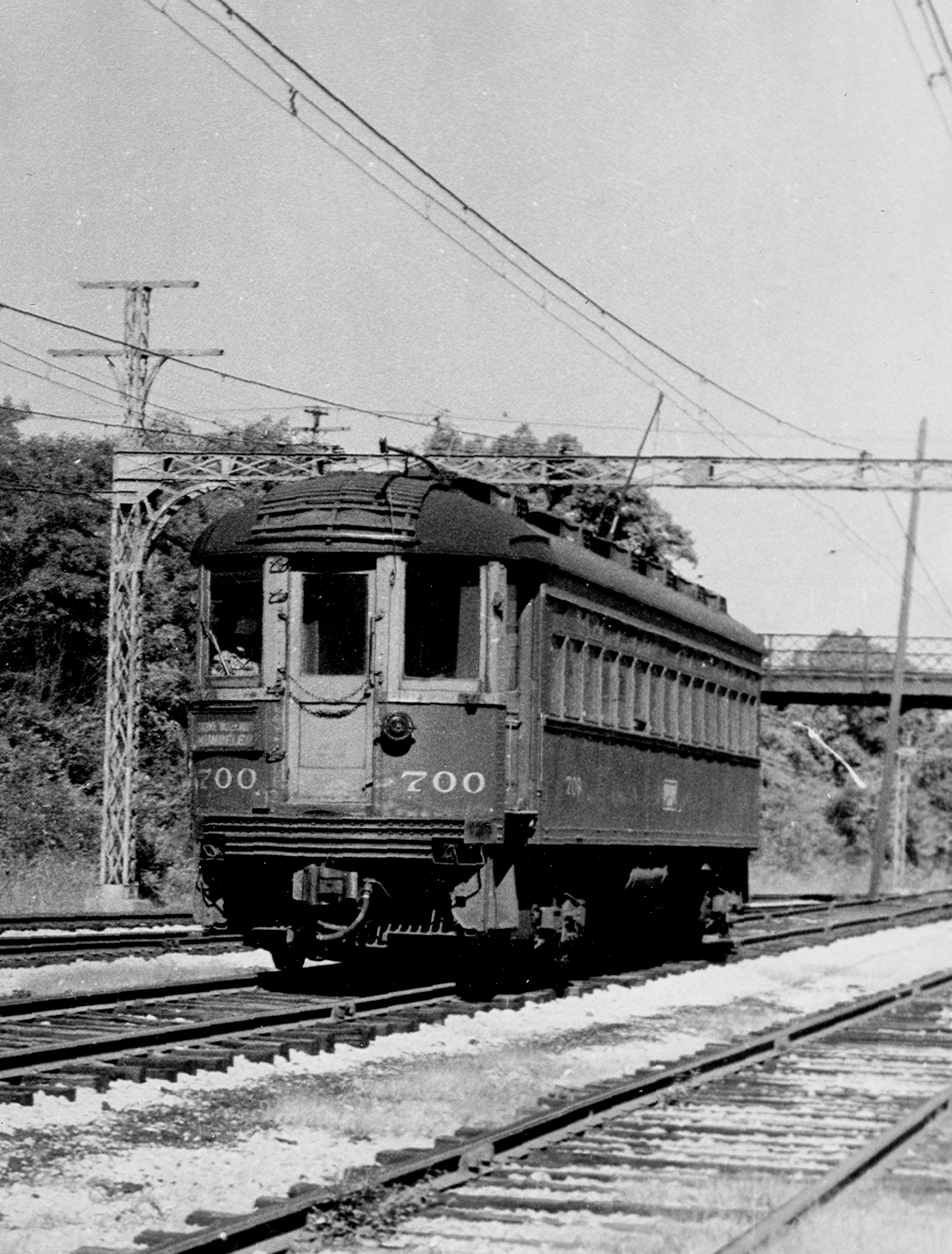
- Cincinnati car 700 near Green Bay Junction in Lake Bluff c. 1958.

Overview
- Headquarters: Highwood, Illinois
- Reporting mark: CNSM
- Locale: Illinois and Wisconsin
- Dates of operation: July 16, 1916–January 21, 1963
- Predecessor: Chicago and Milwaukee Electric Railroad
- Successor: Skokie Swift

Technical
- Track gauge: 4 ft 8 1/2 in (1,435 mm) standard gauge
- Electrification: Overhead line, 650 V DC; Third rail, 600 V DC (Chicago "L")
- Length: In 1954: 88.9 route miles (143 km); 285.1 track miles (459 km)
Route map
North Shore Line highlighted in red
Greatest extent highlighted in blue

The Chicago North Shore and Milwaukee Railroad (reporting mark CNSM), also known as the North Shore Line, was an interurban railroad that operated passenger and freight service over an 88.9-mile (143.1 km) route between the Chicago Loop and downtown Milwaukee, as well as an 8.6-mile (13.8 km) branch line between the villages of Lake Bluff and Mundelein, Illinois. The North Shore Line also provided streetcar, city bus and motor coach services along its interurban route.

Extensively improved under the one-time ownership of Samuel Insull, the North Shore Line was notable for its high operating speeds and substantial physical plant, as well as innovative services, such as its pioneering "ferry truck" operations and its streamlined Electroliner trainsets. Author and railroad historian William D. Middleton described the North Shore Line as a "super interurban" and opined that its cessation of rail service marked the end of the "interurban era" in the United States.

Since 1964 the Yellow Line of the Chicago Transit Authority (CTA) has operated over a short segment of the former main line from Chicago to Skokie, Illinois as a rapid transit line of the Chicago "L". Operating examples of North Shore Line rolling stock have been preserved in railroad museums, and the former Dempster Street Station is listed on the National Register of Historic Places.

== Route ==
=== Interurban lines ===
==== Chicago Division (Shore Line Route) ====
The Shore Line Route was a main line which ran 19.4 miles (31.2 km) through the North Shore region from Linden Avenue in Wilmette to North Chicago Junction, parallel to Sheridan Road and the Old Line subdivision of the Chicago and North Western Railway (C&NW). A freight interchange connection was made with the C&NW at North Chicago, though freight service was not permitted to operate on the line south of Highland Park. The Shore Line Route was almost entirely double-tracked, aside from a short segment of gauntlet track in Glencoe, and included several segments of street running.

Power was supplied by overhead trolley wire. Between 1938 and 1941, 4 miles (6.4 km) of the line through Glencoe and Winnetka were rebuilt as part of a Public Works Administration grade separation project which included the installation of automatic block signaling and overhead catenary along the improved section. Passenger service on the Shore Line Route was discontinued in 1955, after which it was abandoned south of Elm Place in Highland Park, reduced to a single-track line, and utilized for exclusively for freight service, as well as non-revenue access to the company facilities at Highwood.

==== Skokie Division (Skokie Valley Route) ====
The Skokie Valley Route was a main line cutoff which ran 25 miles (40 km) through the Skokie River valley from Howard Street in Chicago to North Chicago Junction, parallel to U.S. Route 41. A freight interchange connection was made with the C&NW at Oakton Street in Skokie. The Skokie Valley Route was entirely double-tracked, located on private right-of-way, and utilized an automatic block signaling system. Power was supplied by a combination of third rail and overhead catenary, with the transition made between East Prairie Road and Crawford Avenue in Skokie.

The Skokie Valley Route was constructed between 1923 and 1926, with the purpose of enabling high-speed limited-stop trains to bypass the increasingly congested Shore Line Route. From 1925 to 1948, the Chicago Rapid Transit Company (and later the CTA) operated local rapid transit service over the Skokie Valley Route between Howard Street and Dempster Street in Skokie. The Skokie Shops were also constructed along the Skokie Valley Route, and the CTA continued to utilize the line to access these facilities from Howard Street after local rapid transit service had been discontinued.

==== Milwaukee Division ====
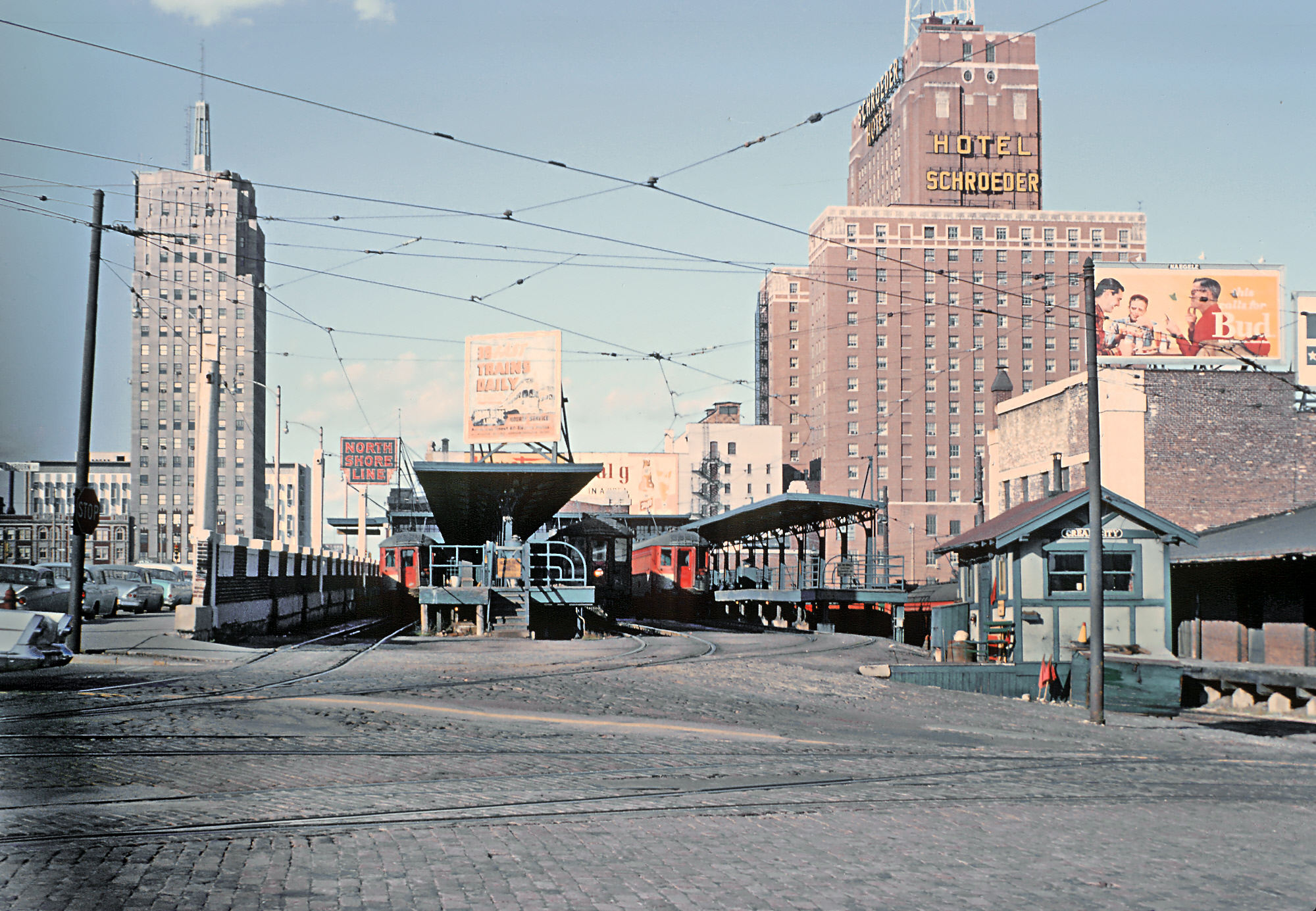
North Shore Facilities in Milwaukee, 1962

The Milwaukee Division was a main line which ran 48.2 miles (77.6 km) from North Chicago Junction to Harrison Avenue in Milwaukee, and served the intermediate cities of Waukegan, Zion, Kenosha and Racine. A freight interchange connection was made with the Chicago, Milwaukee, St. Paul and Pacific Railroad (Milwaukee Road) at Racine. The Milwaukee Division was almost entirely double-tracked, aside from 0.6 miles (0.97 km) of single-track operation between Austin Avenue and Oklahoma Avenue on the south side of Milwaukee, and was located entirely on private right-of-way.

The Milwaukee Division utilized block signaling, with automatic systems in place between North Chicago and Kenosha, as well as between Ryan Road in Oak Creek and Harrison Avenue, while a manual system was in place over the segment between Kenosha and Ryan Road. Power was supplied by a combination of overhead catenary and overhead trolley wire, with the transition made on the north end of Waukegan.

==== Libertyville Division ====
The Libertyville Division was a branch line which ran 8.6 miles (13.8 km) from Lake Bluff to Mundelein, parallel to Illinois Route 176. Connections were made with the Shore Line Route at Lake Bluff, and with the Skokie Valley Route at Green Bay Junction as well as at South Upton Junction. Freight interchange connections were made with the Elgin, Joliet and Eastern Railway (EJ&E) and the Milwaukee Road at Rondout, and with the Wisconsin Central Railway at Mundelein. The Libertyville Division was almost entirely double-tracked, aside from a short segment of single-track operation east of Green Bay Junction. Power was supplied primarily by overhead trolley wire, though sections of overhead catenary were utilized along the connections with the Skokie Valley Route between Lake Bluff and South Upton.

=== City lines ===
==== Waukegan–North Chicago ====
The North Shore Line operated an electric street railway in the cities of Waukegan and North Chicago which consisted of two lines:

- The North Avenue Line ran 5.06 miles (8.14 km) from North Chicago Junction to Greenwood Avenue on the north side of Waukegan, with additional branches to Western Avenue and Sheridan Road along Glen Flora Avenue. A connection to the Milwaukee Division was made at the intersection of Glen Flora and Western Avenues. The North Avenue Line was double-tracked between North Chicago Junction and Water Street, while North of Water Street, the line was single-tracked, and made use of passing sidings protected by Nachod signals. The North Avenue Line was primarily located in city streets, though private right-of-way was utilized between North Chicago Junction and 10th Street in Waukegan.
- The Washington Street line ran 1.35 miles (2.17 km) from Sheridan Road to Lewis Avenue along Washington Street in Waukegan. A connection to the Milwaukee Division was made at Edison Court. The Washington Street line was entirely single-tracked, and utilized unprotected passing sidings.

Power to the Waukegan city lines was supplied by overhead trolley wire. Shore Line Route trains operated over 3.1 miles (5.0 km) of the North Avenue Line between North Chicago Junction and downtown Waukegan, where an interurban terminal was located at the intersection of County and Washington Streets after 1929. Freight service was provided to a number of industries between North Chicago Junction and 10th Street, and deliveries of coal were transported from the Milwaukee Division to the Victory Memorial Hospital via the Glen Flora Avenue lines. After the end of street railway service in 1947, the North Avenue Line was truncated at 10th Street in Waukegan and incorporated into the Shore Line Route until 1955.

==== Milwaukee ====
The Chicago and Milwaukee Electric Railway Company, a wholly owned subsidiary of the North Shore Line, operated a single street railway line in the city of Milwaukee. The Milwaukee city line ran 3.46 miles (5.57 km) from Harrison Avenue to the intersection of 2nd Street and Wisconsin Avenue in the Westown neighborhood. Connections existed with the city service of The Milwaukee Electric Railway and Light Company (TMER&L), which utilized the tracks on Wells Street between 2nd and 5th Avenues until it was discontinued in 1958. The Milwaukee city line was entirely double-tracked and located in city streets.

Power was supplied by overhead trolley wire. Milwaukee Division trains initially operated over the entire length of the line and terminated on 2nd Street. In 1920 a dedicated passenger terminal was constructed near the intersection of 6th and Michigan Streets, reducing interurban operations over the city line to 2.8 miles. After the subsidiary company ceased its street railway operations in 1951, the North Shore Line assumed its franchise and continued to operate interurban service to the 6th Street terminal until 1963.

=== Chicago "L" ===
==== Evanston Line ====
Shore Line Route trains operated over the entire 4-mile (6.4 km) Evanston Line of the Chicago "L" from Linden Avenue in Wilmette to Howard Street in Chicago. Power was supplied by overhead trolley wire. When the North Shore Line assumed operations of the Chicago and Milwaukee Electric Railroad in 1916, trains only traveled as far south as Church Street in Evanston, where a passenger terminal and stub tracks had been constructed. After direct service into Chicago began in 1919, the Church Street station was reconfigured for through service, and retained as a terminal for local trains. Intermediate stops between Linden Avenue and Church Street included Isabella Street in Wilmette, as well as Central Street, Noyes Street and Foster Street in Evanston. Operation over the Evanston Line ceased when passenger service on the Shore Line Route was discontinued in 1955.

==== Howard Street–Roosevelt Road ====
In 1919, the North Shore Line negotiated a trackage rights agreement which permitted its trains to operate directly into Chicago over 12 miles (19 km) of the "L" from Howard Street to Roosevelt Road on the Near South Side. On the quadruple-track portion of the North Side Main Line from Howard Street to Chicago Avenue, North Shore Line trains typically utilized the express tracks to avoid interference from local "L" trains, though the exact routing varied over the years. After its completion in 1943, trains were occasionally diverted through the State Street Subway if the North Side Main Line was obstructed. Power was supplied primarily by third rail, though overhead trolley wire was utilized on the outermost southbound track between Howard Street and Granville Avenue.

North Shore Line trains made limited stops at Wilson Avenue, Belmont Avenue, Chicago Avenue, Grand Avenue and the Merchandise Mart. South of Merchandise Mart, trains operated counter-clockwise over the Loop, with southbound trains making stops at the Randolph/Wells, Madison/Wells, Quincy/Wells, LaSalle/Van Buren and State/Van Buren stations, while northbound trains made stops at the Adams/Wabash, Madison/Wabash, Randolph/Wabash and Clark/Lake stations. Between the Loop and Roosevelt Road, trains made an intermediate stop at the Congress/Wabash station, and the North Shore Line utilized the Congress Terminal as its downtown baggage station, an arrangement which continued after the CTA vacated the terminal in 1949. Operation into Chicago over the "L" was maintained until the end of rail service in 1963.

==== South Side extension ====
In 1922, another trackage rights agreement was negotiated which permitted certain North Shore Line trains to operate over the South Side Elevated from Roosevelt Road to the 63rd/Dorchester station in the Woodlawn neighborhood. Trains made intermediate stops at 43rd Street, 61st Street, South Park Avenue, Cottage Grove Avenue and University Avenue. Operation over the South Side Elevated provided the North Shore Line with access to the Chicago "L" yards at 61st and 63rd Streets. Service south of Roosevelt Road was discontinued in 1938.

== History ==
=== Early history ===
The Bluff City Electric Street Railway Company began operation in May 1895 as a local street railway line in the city of Waukegan, Illinois. The Bluff City Electric line had already been extended as far south as Highland Park when it was acquired by the newly incorporated Chicago and Milwaukee Electric Railroad in May 1898, and the following March a connection was made to the Chicago, Milwaukee & St. Paul Railway (Milwaukee Road) line at Wilmette. In August 1899, through service began operating from downtown Waukegan to Church Street in Evanston, where passengers could transfer to trains of the Northwestern Elevated Railroad and continue into Chicago. The rudimentary, single-tracked interurban line was steadily upgraded over the following decade, with the addition of a second track, improvements to the physical plant and the gradual relocation from street running onto private right-of-way where possible.

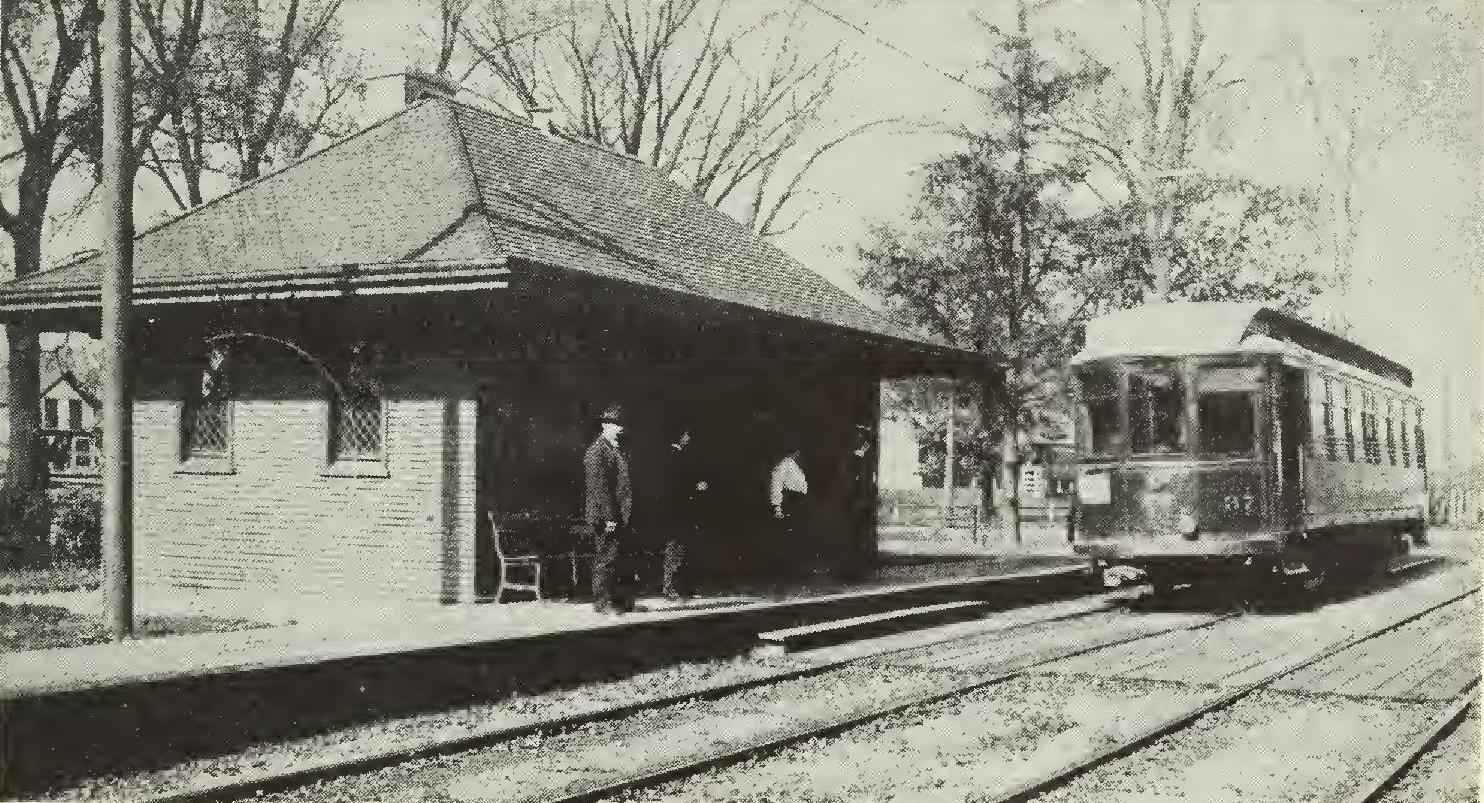
Chicago and Milwaukee Electric car 37 in Wilmette c. 1910.

Between 1902 and 1904, a branch line was constructed from the mainline at Lake Bluff to Libertyville. In 1905, this branch line was extended further west to Mundelein (then known as “Rockefeller”). In addition to giving the Chicago and Milwaukee Electric access to a large gravel pit east of Libertyville, the new branch line also enabled the interchange of carload freight with both the EJ&E and the Milwaukee Road at Rondout, as well as with the Wisconsin Central Railway at Mundelein. Around this same time, a single-track spur line known as the "West Line" was constructed from the Libertyville branch at Lake Bluff into the city of North Chicago, where it terminated south of 22nd Street.

In 1904, the Chicago and Milwaukee Electric began to purchase property and negotiate contracts for the extension of its service into Wisconsin. Construction between Waukegan and Zion City was largely complete by the summer of 1905. Further construction proceeded at such a pace that trains began operating as far north as Kenosha, Wisconsin by December of that year, followed by Racine in September 1906. Shortly thereafter, the Panic of 1907 forced the Chicago and Milwaukee Electric into a prolonged period of insolvency, but in spite of ongoing financial trouble, construction in Wisconsin continued. The northern extension was finally completed in 1908, with through service between Evanston and Milwaukee beginning that October.

Though the Chicago and Milwaukee Electric had been placed under receivership in 1908, patronage and revenue continued to grow, permitting more improvements to the property. Bridges between Racine and Milwaukee were upgraded and the original mainline underwent significant rehabilitation, as did the street railway in Waukegan, which had since begun operating a line on Washington Street. New rolling stock was acquired, including an order of steel coaches delivered from the J.G. Brill Company in late 1915. The possibility of a direct entry into Chicago over the elevated lines was also studied during this time, with the intent to eliminate the necessity of transferring at Church Street, and thereby making the interurban service more competitive with the steam railroads.

=== The Insull years ===
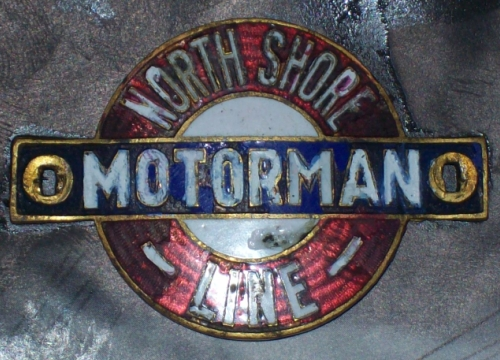
Hat pin from motorman on the Chicago, North Shore and Milwaukee railroad.

When the North Shore Line assumed operations of the Chicago and Milwaukee Electric Railroad in 1916, it inherited an arrangement in which its trains operated on the Chicago and Evanston Line of the Chicago, Milwaukee and St. Paul Railroad south of Laurel Avenue in Wilmette to a terminal at Church Street in Evanston, where passengers transferred to and from Northwestern Elevated trains.

In 1919, further trackage rights agreements were negotiated with both the Northwestern Elevated and the St. Paul Road which permitted North Shore Line trains to operate over the "L" south of Church Street, over the North Side Main Line and through the Loop, to a downtown terminal at Roosevelt Road. The following year, a new terminal in Milwaukee was dedicated, and in succeeding years, the remaining single-track in Wisconsin was eliminated, with the exception of a one-half-mile stretch of single-track in southern Milwaukee that remained a minor bottleneck until the railroad's end.

During the early 1920s, the railroad instituted a number of named, limited-stop trains, some carrying deluxe dining and parlor/observation cars. One of the railroad's most distinctive named trains, inaugurated in 1917, was the Gold Coast Limited. The North Shore also created a network of motor coach (bus) lines to feed on potential traffic from territory not directly served by the company's trains.

==== Construction of the Skokie Valley route ====
The growth of the north shore communities provided good traffic levels for the railroad, but the increasing congestion of these communities' business districts impeded the railroad's desire to remain competitive with the competing steam railroads for longer-haul passenger business, in particular the Chicago-Milwaukee traffic. The North Shore therefore sought to build a new bypass line through the Skokie Valley – what was then undeveloped rural land approximately four to five miles west of the lake shore route.

The needed real estate purchases and financing were arranged in 1923 and 1924, and construction of the new line began in April 1924. The new line diverged from the Howard Street "L" station located at the boundary between Chicago and Evanston, ran west into the village of Niles Center (now Skokie), continuing to the north-northwest from that point through marshy countryside, paralleling the Skokie branch of the Chicago and North Western Railway. At South Upton, the new route ran eastward along the North Shore's Mundelein branch until just west of Lake Bluff, at which point a new connection diverged to the north onto what had been a freight-only branch which connected to the original main line at North Chicago Junction.

An arrangement was made with the Chicago Rapid Transit Company, wherein local "L" service was begun over the new line to the Dempster Street station in Niles Center in 1925. It had been anticipated that the opening of the new "L" line would help launch a real estate boom in the area as it had decades earlier in other parts of the Chicago area. The Great Depression put a damper on the area's growth, and Niles Center (by that time renamed Skokie) didn't really begin to experience a surge of growth until the 1950s.

Though the Niles Center elevated service failed to prosper, the transit operator benefited from the construction of new shop facilities on vacant land along the southern part of the Skokie Valley line. This spacious facility relieved older, more crowded facilities on the "L" system and remains to this day as the Chicago Transit Authority's primary maintenance facility for its rail system: the Skokie Shops.

The remaining portion of the North Shore Line's new Skokie Valley line entered service in 1926. The new route consisted of 18 miles (29 km) of new double-track railroad, and the route was a mere 2.5 miles (4 km) longer than the old main line. Because it traversed mostly rural area, higher speeds could be sustained for a longer distance. In conjunction with the completion of the Skokie Valley route, the railroad had improved the Mundelein branch, building a new terminal and double-tracking the branch. Mundelein had previously been served by shuttle service connecting with main line trains at Lake Bluff; with the opening of the new Skokie Valley line on June 5, 1926, North Shore inaugurated an hourly Chicago-Mundelein local suburban service, interspersed with the hourly Chicago-Milwaukee limited-stop trains. Diversion of the Chicago-Milwaukee service onto the Skokie Valley line brought a reduction in travel time of 20 minutes.

The original main line – now designated by the railroad as the Shore Line – continued to host Chicago-Waukegan service, which consisted of limited-stop Chicago-Waukegan service as well as all-stop local service, each operating at roughly 30-minute headways.

=== The Great Depression ===
Initially after the stock market crash in 1929, business went on as usual, but as the depression deepened and as the Insull public utility empire began to crumble, the railroad entered receivership in 1932. The dire economic conditions and high unemployment caused ridership (and hence revenue) to plummet. A labor strike in 1938 precipitated by a 15% reduction in wages kept the railroad from operating for seven weeks.

In spite of the difficult conditions during the 1930s, the North Shore was able to undertake a major grade separation project along the Shore Line. The North Shore had for nearly a quarter century sought to eliminate the hazards and operating costs associated with running a busy railroad through the business districts of one built-up suburb after another. Prior to the Depression, grade separation projects had been funded by the railroads' private capital, and neither the North Shore Line nor the paralleling steam-operated Chicago and North Western Railway were in a financial position to undertake such a venture even before the stock market crash in 1929.

However, in 1937, President Franklin D. Roosevelt and his Secretary of the Interior, Harold L. Ickes (a Winnetka resident), announced a Public Works Administration program to "prime the pump" of the American economy. This timely program allowed the railroads and the communities of Winnetka and Glencoe to obtain federal funding for the grade separation of the two railroads through their business districts. The project was complicated by the need for construction work to take place under traffic – the two railroads combined operated more than 200 daily trains. The grade separation was completed in late 1941 – just nine weeks before the United States went to war – and cost $4.3 million.

=== Modernization: Green Liners and Electroliners ===
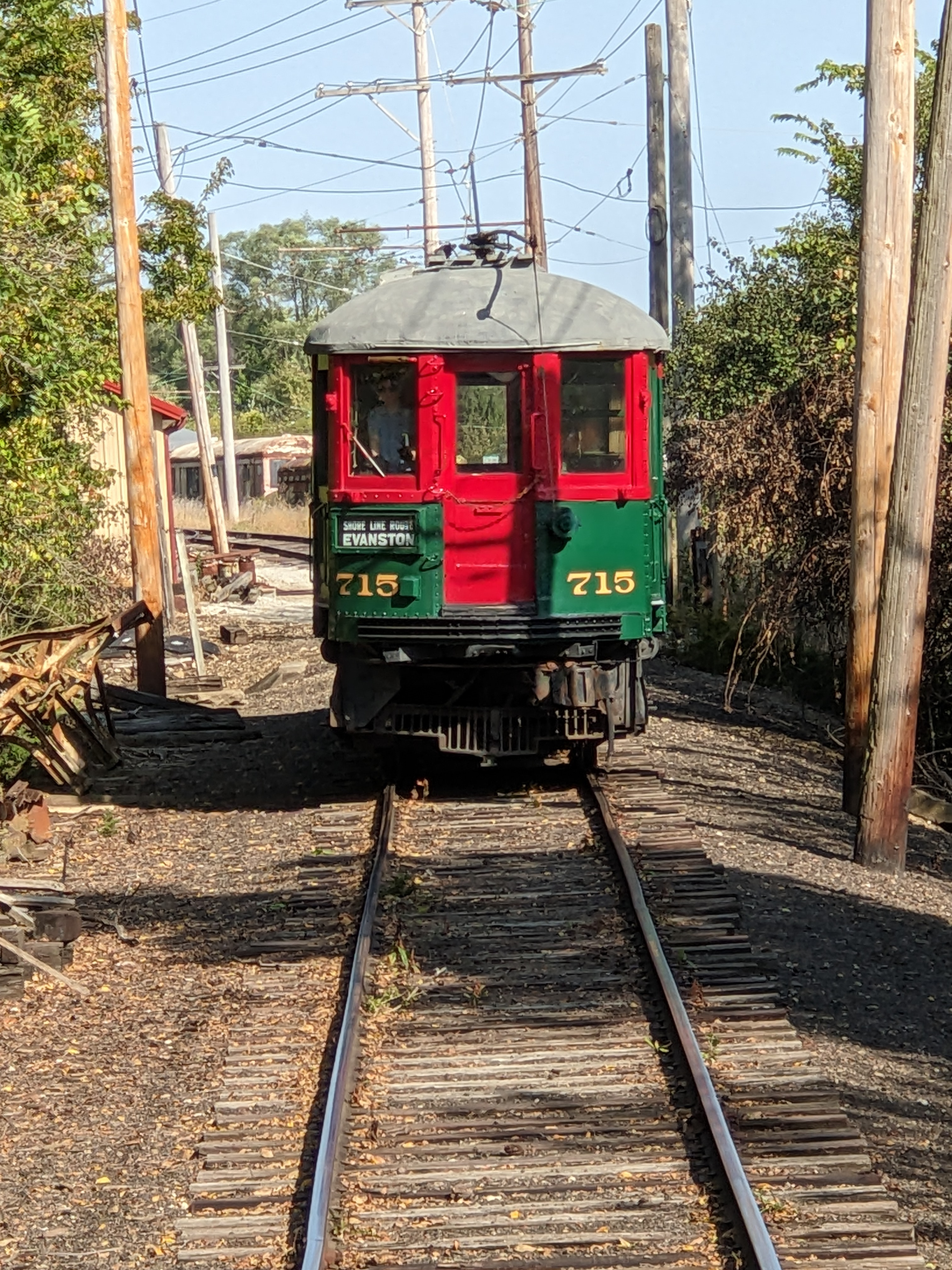
North Shore Line "Greenliner" #715 at the Fox River Trolley Museum.

To meet the competition of modern streamlined trains operating on the steam railroads connecting Chicago and Milwaukee, the North Shore in 1939 embarked on a program to modernize a portion of its steel coach fleet for both commuter and intercity service. Some 15 coaches dating from 1928 were modernized, practically from the ground up. All-electric heating was installed with a new ventilation system, new flooring, new interior decorations and fittings. The cars' exteriors were painted green with gray and red trim, and were dubbed "Greenliners". These cars were regularly assigned to Skokie Valley limited-stop service.

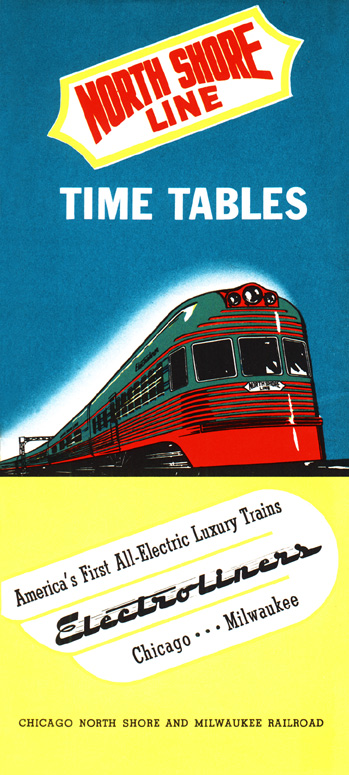
North Shore public timetable dated February 9, 1941, introducing the Electroliners

The most significant component of the passenger equipment modernization program was the purchase of two articulated streamlined trainsets. The trainsets consisted of four cars semi-permanently attached. The two end units included operating cabs and smoking and non-smoking coach seating. An additional car provided more coach seating, and the tavern/lounge car rounded out the four-car consist. These trains were dubbed Electroliners and were the railroad's premiere service run as fast as 90 mph between Dempster Street and North Chicago Junction on the North Shore's excellent track and roadbed.

Entering service in February 1941, each trainset was scheduled to run five one-way trips in Chicago-Milwaukee service every day. The Electroliners continued in service until the end of the railroad's operation in 1963. The Electroliners were sold to the Philadelphia Suburban Transportation Company and were renamed Liberty Liners, and ran in service on the Norristown High Speed Line until their retirement around 1979.

=== Wartime rush and post-war decline ===
The outbreak of World War II caused the railroads of the United States to see a sharp rise in traffic. Even before the imposition of rationing of fuel and rubber made auto travel difficult, the North Shore saw its freight and passenger traffic rise to record levels, in part due to the railroad serving important military facilities: the Army's Fort Sheridan just north of Highwood, and the Navy's Great Lakes Naval Training Station, just south of North Chicago. North Shore saw its traffic increase to the extent that the railroad was forced to borrow equipment from the Chicago Rapid Transit Company and fellow interurban Chicago Aurora and Elgin Railroad, both former Insull properties.

Wartime earnings were high enough that the railroad's bankruptcy trustees were able to pay some of the company's outstanding debt and submit a reorganization plan. After the plan was approved, a new corporation (with a different corporate name from before) assumed the property in 1946.

The failure to resolve a wage dispute taken to the National Mediation Board in 1948 led to a 91-day work stoppage that spring. The dispute was resolved by increasing both fares and wages, though the company's employees continued to earn less than their counterparts at other area railroads. Simultaneously, a decline in rail travel began as initial postwar shortages of automobiles ended. These national trends—coupled with the lost revenue from the three-month strike and the effects of the strike-settling wage increase—created serious passenger revenue losses for the line. In 1949, the railroad sought to curtail some of its more unprofitable services. Dining car service (other than that on the Electroliners) was dropped, service (particularly on the Shore Line) was reduced, and the railroad applied unsuccessfully to drop Shore Line service altogether.

When the franchise held by the North Shore subsidiary operating streetcar service in Waukegan expired in 1947, the company felt that a renewal was not justified. It replaced its city operations there with bus service. Shore Line trains that used the streetcar tracks to reach downtown Waukegan were simultaneously cut back to allow the tracks to be abandoned. The subsidiary city streetcar service in Milwaukee was discontinued in 1951 but the tracks remained, as they were used by main line services to access the North Shore's Milwaukee terminal.

Right-of-way and trackage between Leland Avenue in Chicago and Linden Avenue in Wilmette was sold to the CTA in 1953, though the Shore Line continued to operate. In turn, the railroad received $7 million USD in CTA revenue bonds.

The railroad repeated its petition to abandon the Shore Line in 1954. Though rush hour traffic levels remained strong, off-peak ridership had declined sharply, leading to further losses. The remaining street running and numerous stops eliminated many of the advantages of rail transportation on this route. Travel time on the Shore Line was roughly twice that of the slightly longer Skokie Valley route. The completion of the Edens Expressway through the Skokie Valley in late 1951 caused mounting ridership losses reflected on the railroad's earnings statements. Though the abandonment proceedings garnered strong opposition in the communities affected, the railroad was successful in proving its case and was authorized to end service on the Shore Line. July 24, 1955 was the final day of service on that route. A short portion of the line was retained to provide access from North Chicago Junction to the railroad's shops in Highwood. The rest of the line north of Linden Avenue in Wilmette was removed, much of the right-of-way becoming automobile parking spaces for commuters who switched to the suburban trains of the parallel C&NW North Line.

=== End of rail service ===
With its transportation holdings proving increasingly unprofitable, the Susquehanna Corporation, a Delaware-based holding corporation formed after a 1953 reorganization, moved to cut its losses; in 1958, the railroad filed with state and federal regulatory authorities for the authority to discontinue all service and abandon the entire property. The Interstate Commerce Commission (ICC) examiner handling the case recommended abandonment, but the Illinois regulators recommended the continued operation of the railroad. For the time being, ridership remained fairly stable, but the completion of the Northwest Expressway (now the Kennedy Expressway) in late 1960 provided a link between the Edens Expressway and the Chicago Loop. The North Shore Line's passenger traffic began to hemorrhage at the rate of 46,000 passengers per month.

The Chicago Transit Authority researched the possibility of continuing truncated rail service between Waukegan and Howard Street in Chicago, with buses assuming operations between Lake Bluff and Mundelein. The report, released that October, revealed that passenger service had dropped to an average of 14,000 daily riders, and that the line was in dire need of modernization. The report recommended that the CTA only assume operations under the conditions that the acquisition of the railroad's property and modernization of the fleet could be achieved without cost to the agency, and an operational subsidy would be provided. In February 1961, an updated study was released, revealing that patronage had become even lighter than it had been when the initial study was conducted. Ultimately, no action was taken as a result of the study, as none of the recommended conditions could be met.

That February, the railroad requested expedited action by the ICC on its abandonment petition, citing its mounting losses. On May 17, 1962, the request was approved under the condition that no buyer stepped forward within 35 days. Both the Illinois regulators and an association of commuters opposed the action, the association offering to buy the railroad at salvage value but ultimately failing to raise sufficient funds to buy the property. That November, the state of Illinois ruled in favor of the ICC, and prevented the commuters association from having the abandonment postponed any further. The last full day of service came on January 20, 1963, with the final trains reaching their destination in the early hours of the following morning. Sporadic freight movements continued into the next week, as the remaining cars on the line were collected from various points on the system.

=== Post-abandonment ===
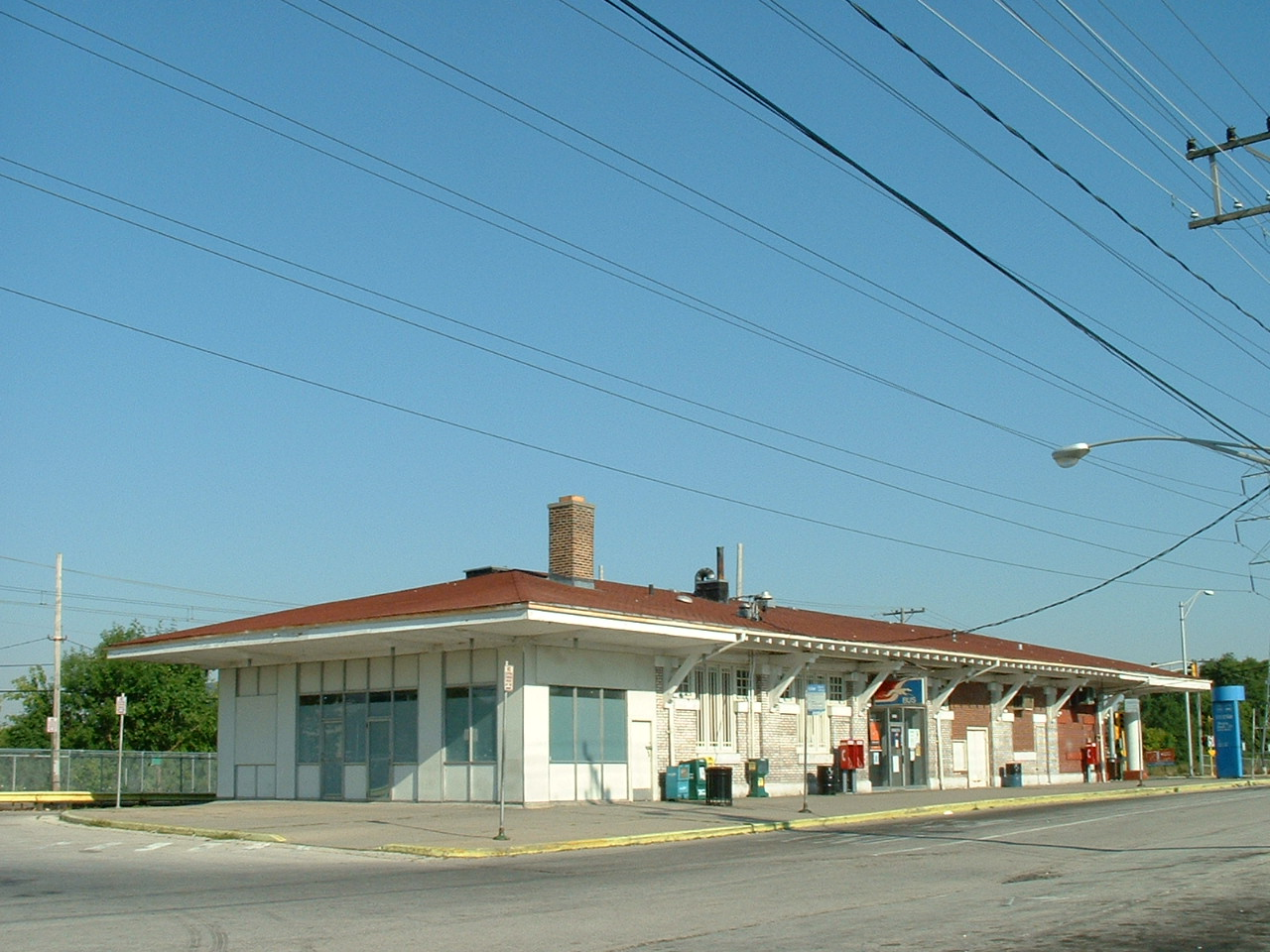
The Dempster street terminal circa Summer 2002

Most of the rails were removed in the succeeding two years. The Chicago Transit Authority purchased the southernmost portion of the Skokie Valley line between Howard Street and Dempster Street, Skokie, and in early 1964 obtained federal funding for what turned out to be a successful mass transportation pilot project, dubbing the new non-stop service as the "Skokie Swift." That same year, the Skokie Valley Transportation Council was formed by the towns of Glenview, Northbrook, Northfield and Skokie, with the goal of reviving rail service by funding an extension of the "Skokie Swift" further north.

This was prevented by the sale of the trackage between Dempster Street and Lake-Cook Road to the Chicago & North Western Railway for use as a freight line. The Union Pacific (into which the North Western was merged in 1995) continued to operate the line until 2001, and it was dismantled in 2004–05. CTA is studying possible extension of the Yellow Line along the North Shore right-of-way as far as Old Orchard Road, opposite the Old Orchard shopping center.

Amtrak's Hiawatha currently serves the passenger rail market between Chicago and Milwaukee. Metra's Union Pacific North Line services the market between Chicago and Kenosha, Wisconsin previously served by the North Shore Line, while the Milwaukee District North Line and North Central Service serve Libertyville and Mundelein, respectively.

The former North Shore right-of-way from the Illinois border to Milwaukee was sold off piecemeal to numerous private interests. In Illinois, extension to the Skokie Swift into the now-fully-developed territory in the Skokie Valley is discussed periodically. In other places, parts of the North Shore right of way have been turned into paved and limestone recreational trails, such as the Oak Creek Line of the Oak Leaf Trail in Milwaukee County, as part of rails to trails programs.

== Preservation ==
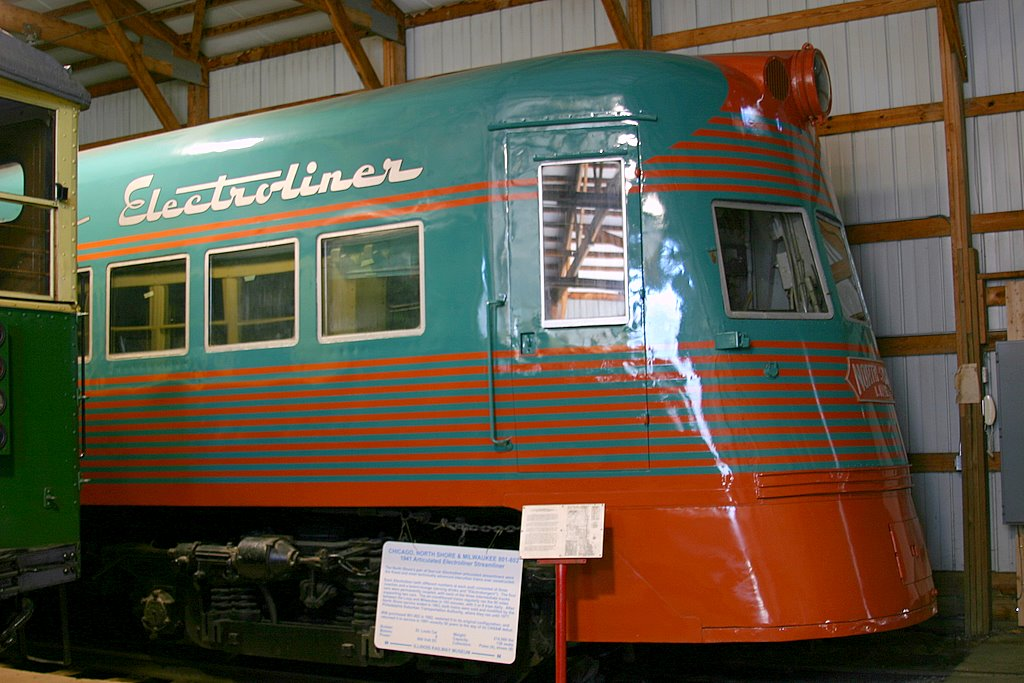
A preserved North Shore Line Electroliner trainset 801/802 at the Illinois Railway Museum in Union, Illinois

Electroliner trainset 801–802 is preserved at the Illinois Railway Museum in Union, Illinois; the museum's holdings also include 15 other passenger and freight cars from the railroad. Both Electroliners saw use on SEPTA's Norristown High Speed Line in Pennsylvania from 1964 to 1980 before being retired. The other Electroliner set, former 803–804, still painted in SEPTA "Liberty Liner" colors, is stored at the Rockhill Trolley Museum in Rockhill Furnace, Pennsylvania.

Other museums that have North Shore Line cars preserved include the Fox River Trolley Museum, in South Elgin, Illinois; the East Troy Electric Railroad Museum in East Troy, Wisconsin; and the Seashore Trolley Museum, in Kennebunkport, Maine. The Iowa Traction Railway, in Mason City, Iowa, also owns former North Shore Line equipment. Unrestored North Shore Line equipment is also in storage at several other museums.

Chicago North Shore and Milwaukee Preservation List
Number	Builder	Photo	Build Year	Location	Car Type	Status
715	Cincinnati Car Company		1926	Fox River Trolley Museum	Steel Interurban Coach	Operational
756	Standard Steel Car Company		1930	Fox River Trolley Museum	Steel Interurban Coach	Awaiting Restoration
604	Chicago and Milwaukee Electric		1914	Illinois Railway Museum	Interurban Line Car	Not Operational
1502	Standard Steel Car Company		1926	Illinois Railway Museum	Interurban Piggyback Car	Not Operational
213	Cincinnati Car Company		1919	Illinois Railway Museum	Double-Trucked Wood Freight Motor (Merchandise Dispatch Car)	Not Operational
218	Cincinnati Car Company		1922	Illinois Railway Museum	Merchandise Dispatch Car	Not Operational
229	Cincinnati Car Company		1922	Illinois Railway Museum	Merchandise Dispatch Car	Operational
160	J. G. Brill Company		1915	Illinois Railway Museum	Steel Interurban Coach	Operational
172	Cincinnati Car Company		1920	Illinois Railway Museum	Steel Interurban Coach	Not Operational
251	Jewett Car Company		1917	Illinois Railway Museum	Steel Interurban Combine	Operational
253	Jewett Car Company		1917	Illinois Railway Museum	Steel Interurban Combine	Not Operational
714	Cincinnati Car Company		1926	Illinois Railway Museum	Steel Interurban Coach	Operational
749	Pullman-Standard		1928	Illinois Railway Museum	Steel Interurban Coach	Operational
757	Standard Steel Car Company		1930	Illinois Railway Museum	Steel Interurban Coach	Operational
763	Standard Steel Car Company		1930	Illinois Railway Museum	Steel Interurban Coach	Operational
801-802	St. Louis Car Company		1941	Illinois Railway Museum	Steel Interurban Articulated Trainset ("Electroliner")	Operational/Undergoing Restoration
803-804	St. Louis Car Company		1941	Rockhill Trolley Museum	Steel Interurban Articulated Trainset ("Electroliner")	Operational/Undergoing Restoration
727	Cincinnati Car Company		1926	Iowa Traction Railway	Steel Interurban Coach	Operational
31	Cincinnati Car Company		1922	Iowa Traction Railway	Merchandise Dispatch Car	Operational
415	Cincinnati Car Company		1926	Seashore Trolley Museum	Steel Interurban Diner	Undergoing Restoration
420	Pullman-Standard		1928	Seashore Trolley Museum	Steel Interurban Coach	Undergoing Restoration
755	Standard Steel Car Company		1930	Seashore Trolley Museum	Steel Interurban Coach	Undergoing Restoration
162	Cincinnati Car Company		1915	East Troy Electric Railroad	Steel Interurban Coach	Undergoing Restoration
228	Cincinnati Car Company		1922	East Troy Electric Railroad	Merchandise Dispatch Car	Operational
761	Standard Steel Car Company		1930	East Troy Electric Railroad	Steel Interurban Coach	Operational

The Dempster station has been preserved, although moved 150 feet to the east. Both the Briergate and Kenosha stations also survive, currently housing commercial operations.

Abandoned and overgrown sections of track exist between Dempster Street and Lake Cook Road in the former Skokie Valley right of way.
