= Quincy station (CTA) =

Chicago "L" station

QUINCY 220S 200W
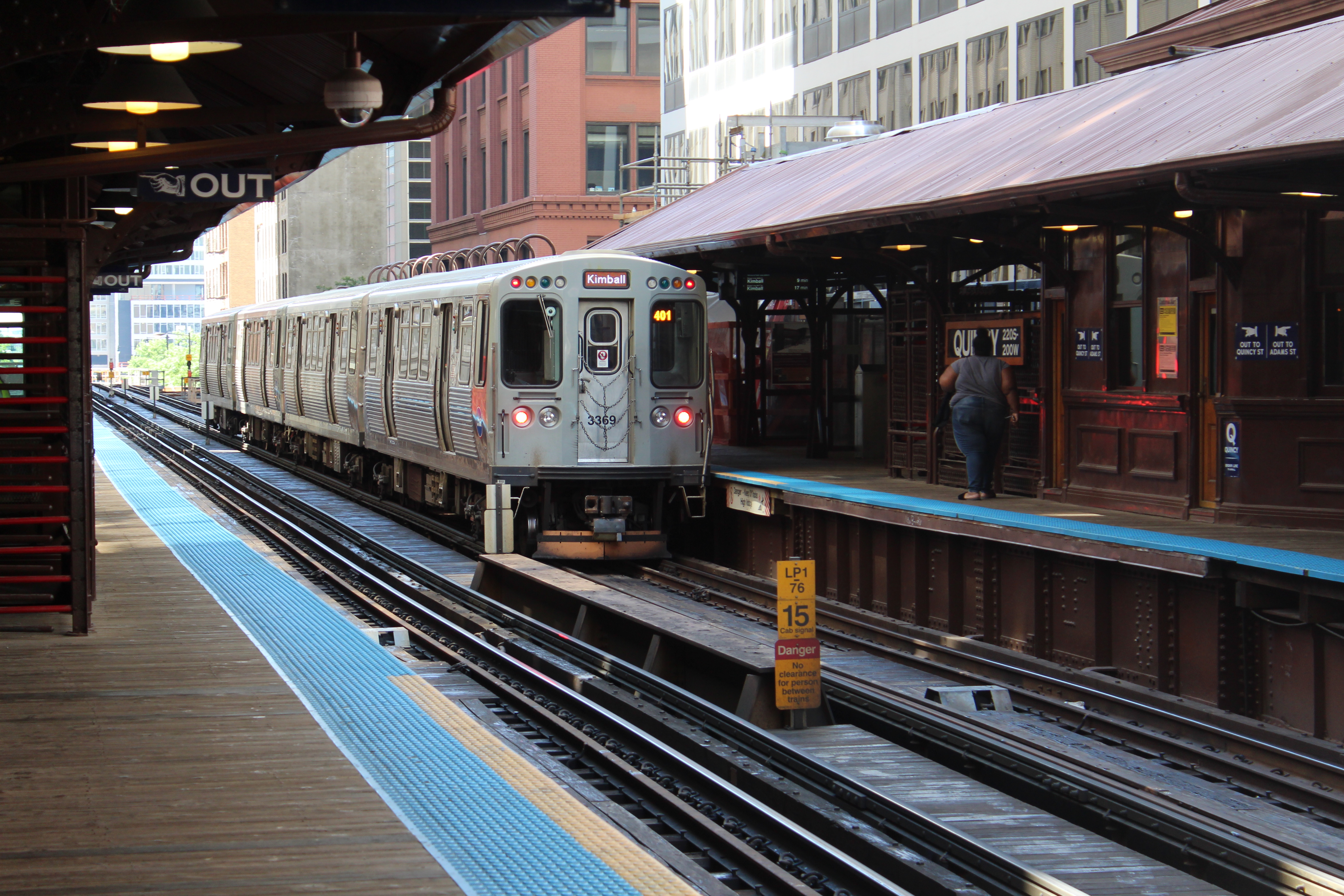
- Kimball-bound Brown Line train leaving Quincy in July 2018

General information
- Location: 220 South Wells Street, Chicago, Illinois 60606
- Coordinates: 41.878752°N 87.633703°W
- Owner: Chicago Transit Authority
- Line: Loop Elevated
- Platforms: 2 side platforms
- Tracks: 2
- Connections: and at Union Station

Construction
- Structure type: Elevated
- Accessible: Yes

History
- Opened: October 3, 1897; 128 years ago
- Rebuilt: 1985–1988; 38 years ago (historic restoration), 2016–2018; 8 years ago (accessibility improvements, historic refurbishment)
- Former names: Quincy/Wells

Passengers
- 2025: 1,503,868 ▲12.3%

Services
Preceding station	Chicago "L"	Following station
Washington/Wells toward Midway	Orange Line	LaSalle/Van Buren One-way operation
Washington/Wells toward Linden	Purple Line Express	LaSalle/Van Buren One-way operation
Washington/Wells toward 54th/Cermak	Pink Line	LaSalle/Van Buren One-way operation
Washington/Wells One-way operation	Brown Line	LaSalle/Van Buren toward Kimball
Former services
Preceding station	Chicago North Shore and Milwaukee Railroad	Following station
Madison/Wells One-way operation	North Shore Line	LaSalle/Van Buren toward Roosevelt Road
Preceding station	Chicago "L"	Following station
Madison/Wells Closed 1994 toward Midway	Orange Line	LaSalle/Van Buren One-way operation
Madison/Wells Closed 1994 toward Linden	Purple Line Express	LaSalle/Van Buren One-way operation
Madison/Wells Closed 1994 One-way operation	Brown Line	LaSalle/Van Buren toward Kimball
Madison/Wells One-way operation	Metropolitan main line	Franklin/Van Buren Closed 1955 toward Marshfield
Track layout
Location

Quincy is a rapid transit station on the Chicago "L" system. It is located between the Washington/Wells and LaSalle/Van Buren stations on the Loop. The station is located above the intersection of Quincy Street and Wells Street in downtown Chicago, Illinois. Having opened in 1897, it is one of the oldest surviving stations on the 'L' system.

== History ==
Designed by Alfred M. Hedley from wood and stamped metal, Quincy opened on October 3, 1897. It retained much of its original surroundings over the years and is considered one of "150 great places in Illinois" by the American Institute of Architects. The station is located in the South Loop Financial District and is the closest CTA rail station to the Willis Tower, approximately one block west. It is also three blocks east of Union Station, which doubles as Chicago's Amtrak station and the downtown terminus for several Metra routes. Although the Clinton station on the Blue Line is closer (two blocks south), Quincy is the nearest stop on the Loop to Union Station.

Quincy is an elevated station, located above Quincy Street between Adams Street and Jackson Boulevard. It features two side platforms and station houses, one on the west to serve the Outer Loop track, and one on the east to serve the Inner Loop track. Turnstiles for fare payment are located in the station houses on the platform level. The station once had a transfer bridge, but this was removed in the 1980s. This means it is not possible to change from one platform to the other without paying another fare or asking for employee assistance. There are auxiliary exits to both Adams and Jackson on the Inner Loop platform, while the Outer Loop only has an auxiliary exit to Adams. There are also auxiliary exits to the mezzanine level from both platforms, all using Rotogates. There is also a "slam" gate at each exit for emergencies only. Unlike most Chicago "L" stations, the "slam" gates do not appear to have alarms. Both platforms are designed to handle eight-car trains, the longest the CTA 'L' system can run.

A renovation project from 1985 to 1988 resulted in Quincy taking on a look similar to the look it had when it opened. Some materials such as signage were changed, although several of the station's features are original to its 1897 opening.

A renovation project began at the station in 2016 and was completed in December 2018. The renovation added two new elevators to the station to make it accessible for people with disabilities, and other improvements include new stairs and new lights. The station remained open during the project. The project was completed in December 2018.

== Train services ==
In normal operation, the station is serviced by the Brown, Orange, and Pink Lines. During weekday rush hours, the Purple Line also stops here. Brown Line trains stop at the Outer Loop platform, while all other lines stop at the Inner Loop platform.

== Bus connections ==
CTA

- 1 Bronzeville/Union Station (weekday rush hours only)
- 7 Harrison (weekdays only)
- 28 Stony Island (weekday rush hours only)
- 37 Sedgwick (weekdays only)
- 126 Jackson
- 134 Stockton/LaSalle Express (weekday rush hours only)
- 135 Clarendon/LaSalle Express (weekday Rush Hours only)
- 136 Sheridan/LaSalle Express (weekday rush hours only)
- 151 Sheridan
- 156 LaSalle (weekdays only)

== Gallery ==
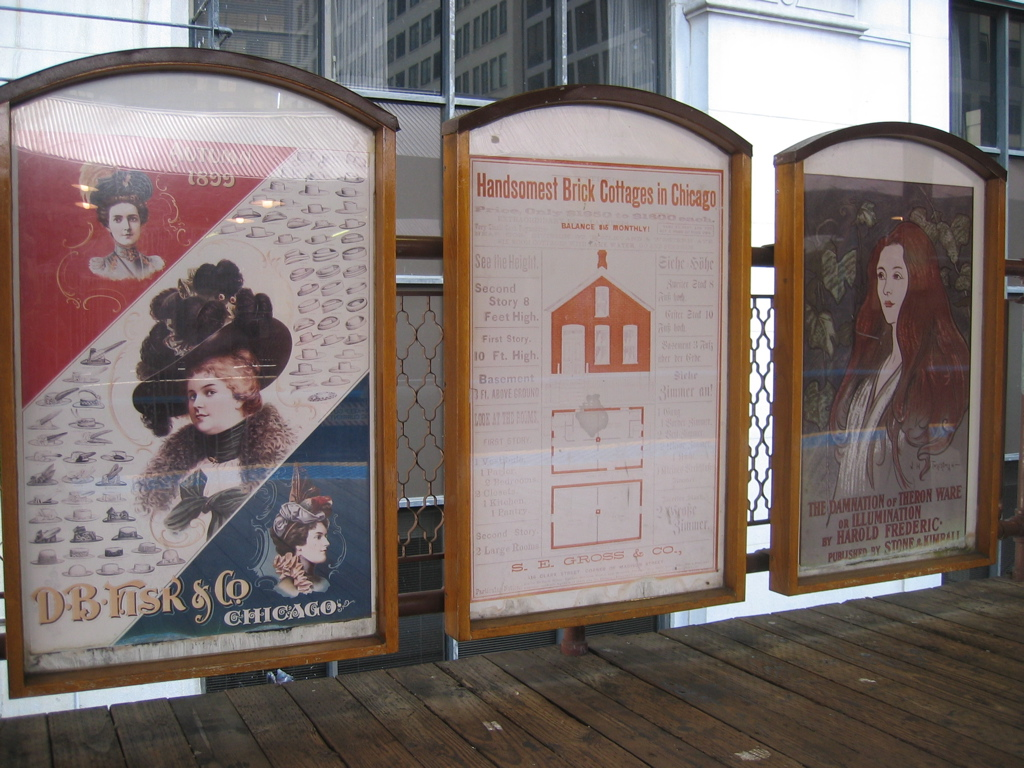
Advertisements at Quincy station

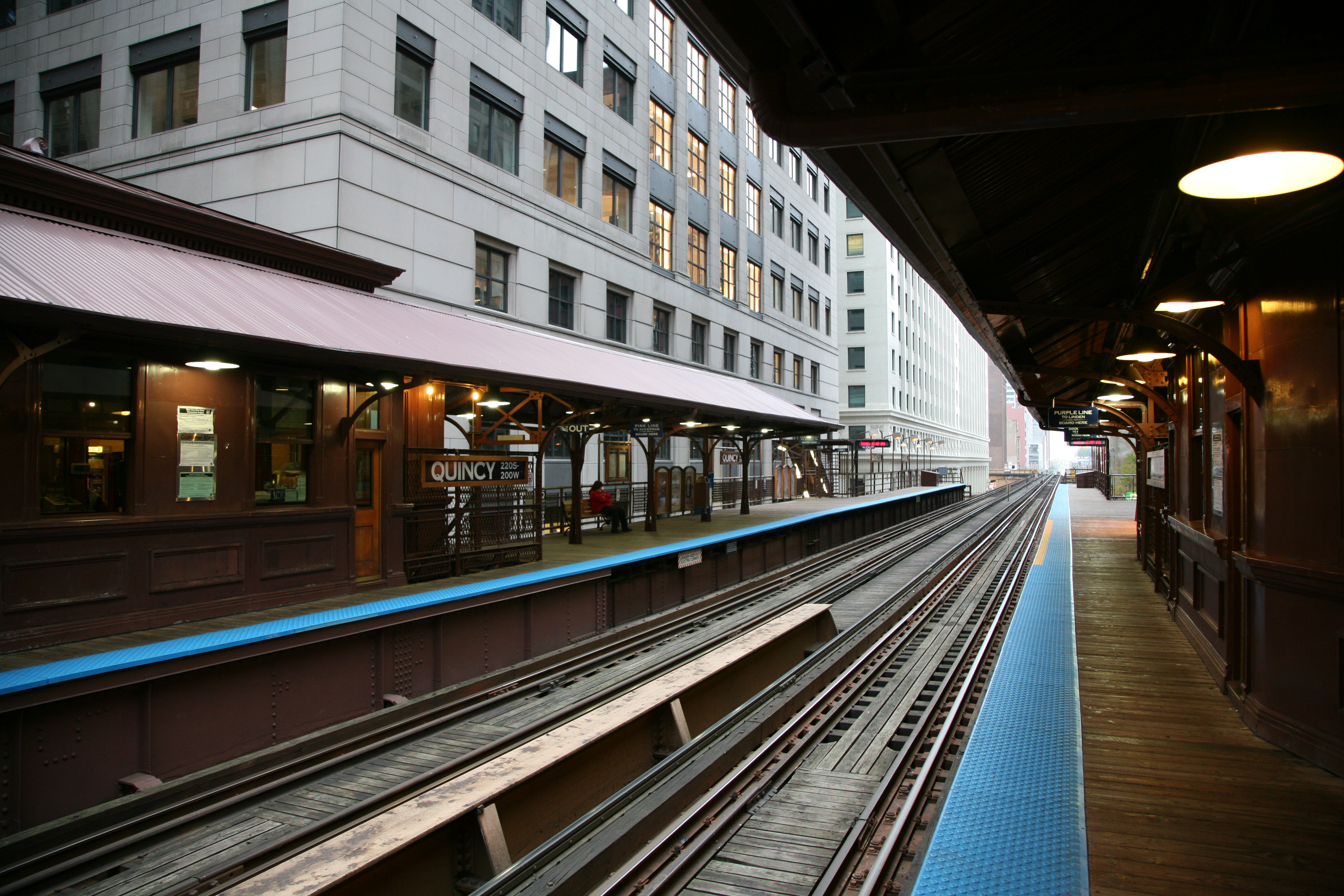
Platform view

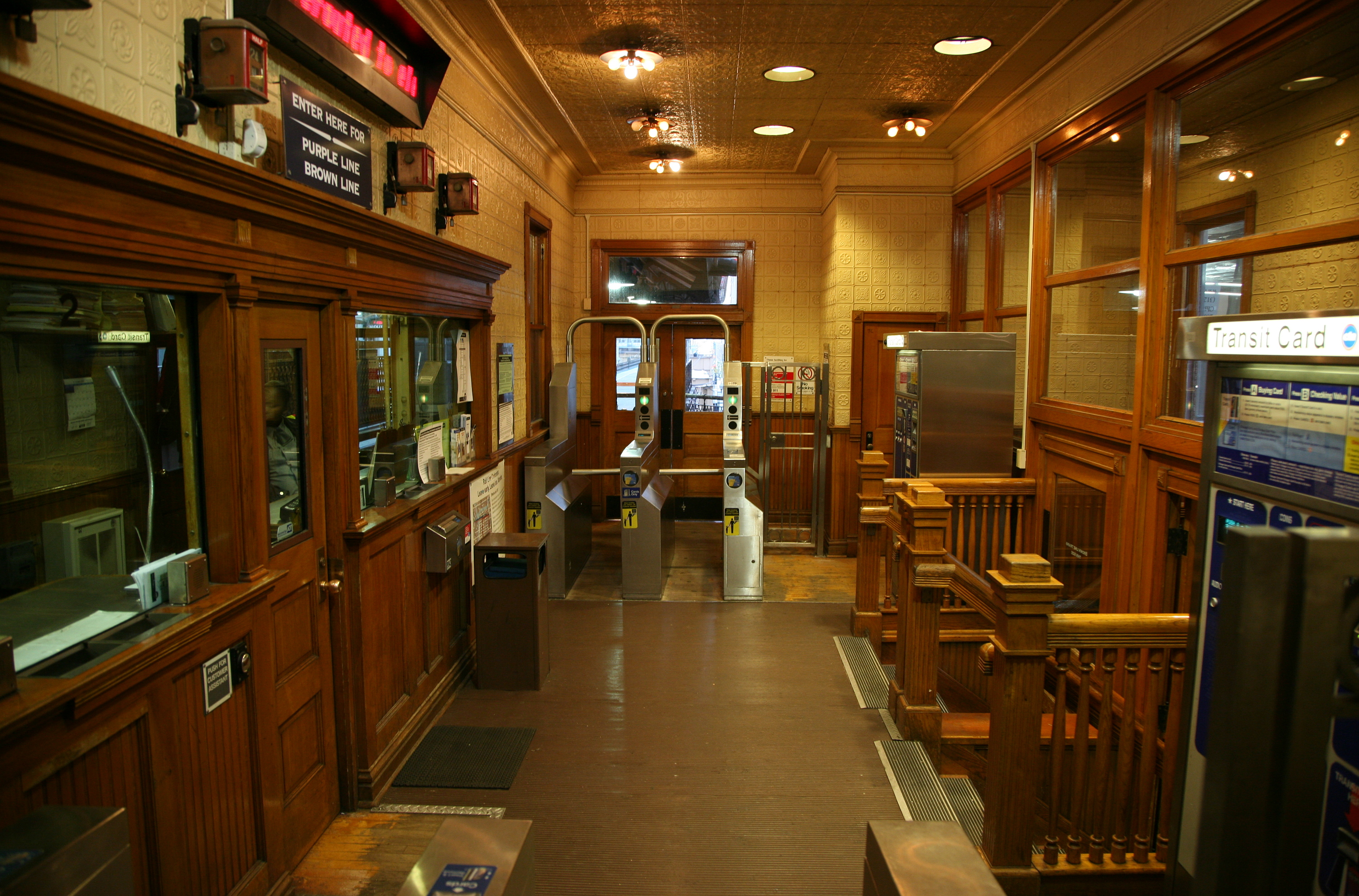
Interior with turnstiles
