= Noyes station =

Chicago "L" station

Noyes 2225N 900W
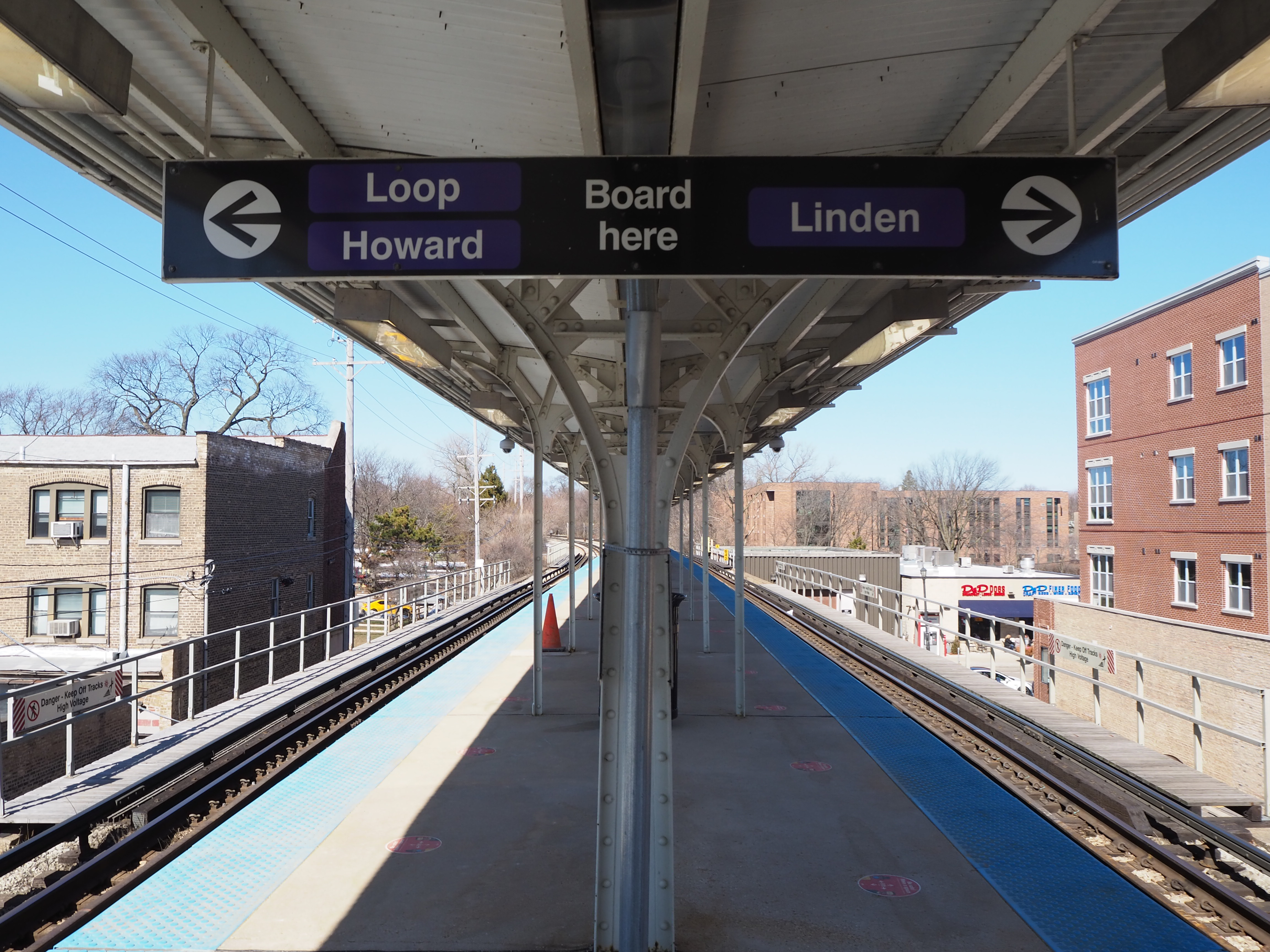

General information
- Location: 909 Noyes Street; Evanston, Illinois 60201
- Coordinates: 42.058088°N 87.683196°W
- Owner: Chicago Transit Authority
- Line: Evanston branch
- Platforms: 1 island platform
- Tracks: 2

Construction
- Structure type: Elevated
- Accessible: No

History
- Opened: May 16, 1908; 118 years ago
- Rebuilt: 1931; 95 years ago

Passengers
- 2025: 176,124 ▲7.9%

Services
Preceding station	Chicago "L"	Following station
Central toward Linden	Purple Line	Foster toward Howard or Loop (Clark/Lake)
Former services
Preceding station	Chicago North Shore and Milwaukee Railroad	Following station
Central toward North Chicago Junction	North Shore Line Shore Line Route	Foster toward Roosevelt Road
Preceding station	Milwaukee Road	Following station
Central Avenue toward Llewellyn Park	Chicago – Evanston	Evanston toward Chicago
Track layout
Location

Noyes is a station on the Chicago Transit Authority's 'L' system, on the Purple Line in Evanston, Illinois. It is located at 909 Noyes Street (directional coordinates 2225 north, 900 west), just a few blocks west of the north end of Northwestern University's Evanston campus. The Noyes Cultural Center is also nearby. This area of Evanston is a mix of residential and light commercial properties.

The automated voice for the station was used in the song "Chamber the Cartridge" by the melodic hardcore band, Rise Against.

== History ==
=== Structure ===
The current station was constructed in the early 1930s and is at least the second station on the site; the first was built at grade level and was demolished when the line north of University Place was elevated. Like the rest of the 'L' north of Wilson, Noyes is elevated on a solid fill embankment, unlike the steel structure commonly associated with the 'L'. The station lacks a formal station house; two staircases on the north side of Noyes Street lead up to a small area containing a customer assistant's booth, a farecard vending machine, and two turnstiles. The island platform is composed of concrete and stretches south from the station entrance, covered by a canopy its entire length. Southbound trains stop on the west side of the platform, while northbound trains stop at the east part. After the station was elevated, Noyes was capable of berthing eight-car trains. Currently the platform can only accommodate six-car trains because the concrete on the northern end of the platform has been removed, although its framing and canopy are still in place.

=== Former service ===
Noyes was served by trains of the Chicago North Shore and Milwaukee Railroad on the Shore Line Route. Like Foster and Central, Noyes had an additional side platform to the west of the southbound track for exclusive use of the North Shore Line, to prevent disembarking customers from transferring to 'L' trains for free. The platform was removed sometime after the North Shore Line ceased operations over this section of the rapid transit system in 1955, but its concrete footings can still be seen opposite the current platform south of Noyes Street.
