= Madison/Wells station =

CTA rapid transit station in Chicago, 1897–1994

Madison/Wells 1N/S 200W
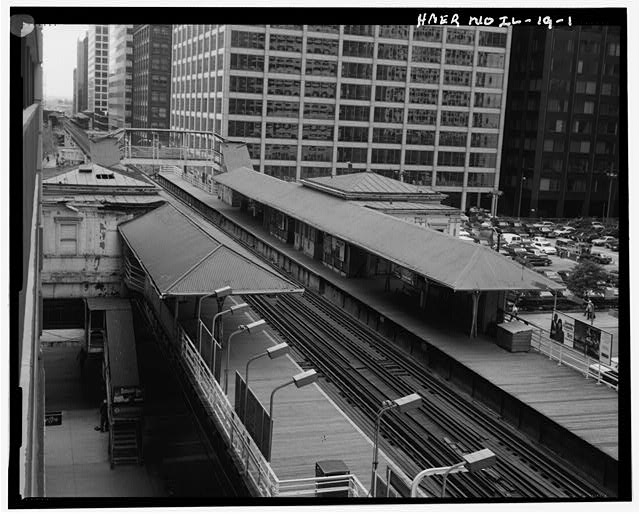

General information
- Location: 1 North Wells Street; Chicago, Illinois 60602
- Coordinates: 41.88194°N 87.63383°W
- Owner: Chicago Transit Authority
- Line: Loop Elevated
- Platforms: 2 side platforms
- Tracks: 2 tracks

Construction
- Structure type: Elevated

History
- Opened: October 3, 1897; 128 years ago
- Closed: January 30, 1994; 32 years ago
- Former names: Madison & Fifth

Former services
Preceding station	Chicago North Shore and Milwaukee Railroad	Following station
Randolph/Wells One-way operation	North Shore Line	Quincy/Wells toward Roosevelt Road
Preceding station	Chicago "L"	Following station
Randolph/Wells toward Midway	Orange Line	Quincy One-way operation
Randolph/Wells toward Linden	Purple Line Express	Quincy One-way operation
Randolph/Wells One-way operation	Brown Line	Quincy toward Kimball
Location

Madison/Wells was a station on the Chicago Transit Authority's Loop. The station was located at 1 North Wells Street in the Chicago Loop. Madison/Wells opened on October 3, 1897, and closed on January 30, 1994, and demolished so that work on the new Washington/Wells station could begin. This station and Randolph/Wells were replaced by Washington/Wells. The station was located at Madison Street and Wells Street in the Chicago Loop.
