= Wilson station (CTA) =

Chicago "L" station

Wilson 4600N 1100W
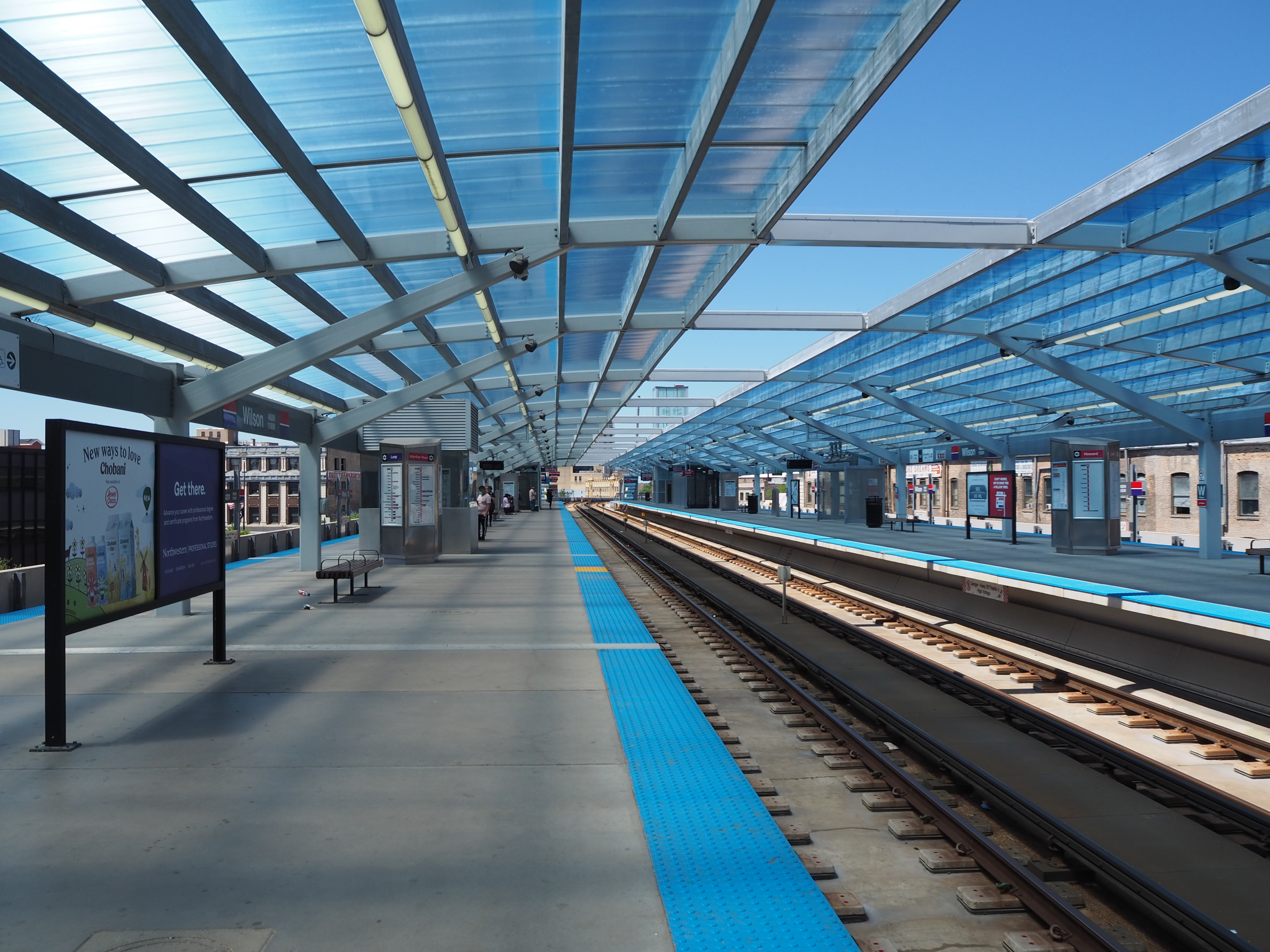
- Center tracks used by the Red Line

General information
- Location: 4620 North Broadway; Chicago, Illinois 60640
- Coordinates: 41.965285°N 87.657965°W
- Owner: Chicago Transit Authority
- Line: North Side main line
- Platforms: 2 island platforms
- Tracks: 4

Construction
- Structure type: Elevated
- Accessible: Yes

History
- Opened: May 31, 1900; 126 years ago
- Rebuilt: 1907; 119 years ago (Lower Wilson added), 1923; 103 years ago, 2014–2017; 9 years ago (station reconstruction)

Passengers
- 2025: 1,652,028 ▼6.4%

Services
Preceding station	Chicago "L"	Following station
Lawrence toward Howard	Red Line	Sheridan toward 95th/Dan Ryan
Howard toward Linden	Purple Line Express	Belmont toward Loop (Clark/Lake)
Former services
Preceding station	Chicago North Shore and Milwaukee Railroad	Following station
Howard Street toward Milwaukee	North Shore Line	Belmont Avenue toward Roosevelt Road
Preceding station	Milwaukee Road	Following station
Argyle Park toward Llewellyn Park	Chicago – Evanston	Buena Park toward Chicago
Preceding station	Chicago "L"	Following station
Lawrence toward Howard	North Side main line	Buena Closed 1949 toward Loop (Randolph/Wells) or North Water Terminal
Track layout
Location

Wilson is an 'L' station on the CTA's North Side Main Line, located at 4620 North Broadway in the Uptown neighborhood of Chicago, Illinois. It is served at all times by the Red Line and by the Purple Line on weekdays at rush hour.

== History ==
=== Early history ===
The Chicago and Evanston Railroad (C&E) began passenger operation on May 1, 1885, with the section north of Montrose Avenue running along the present-day right of way of the Chicago "L". There was not a station at the site of today's Wilson station until 1890–1891, when the C&E opened Sheridan Park station as well as several other infill stations elsewhere.

=== Chicago "L" ===
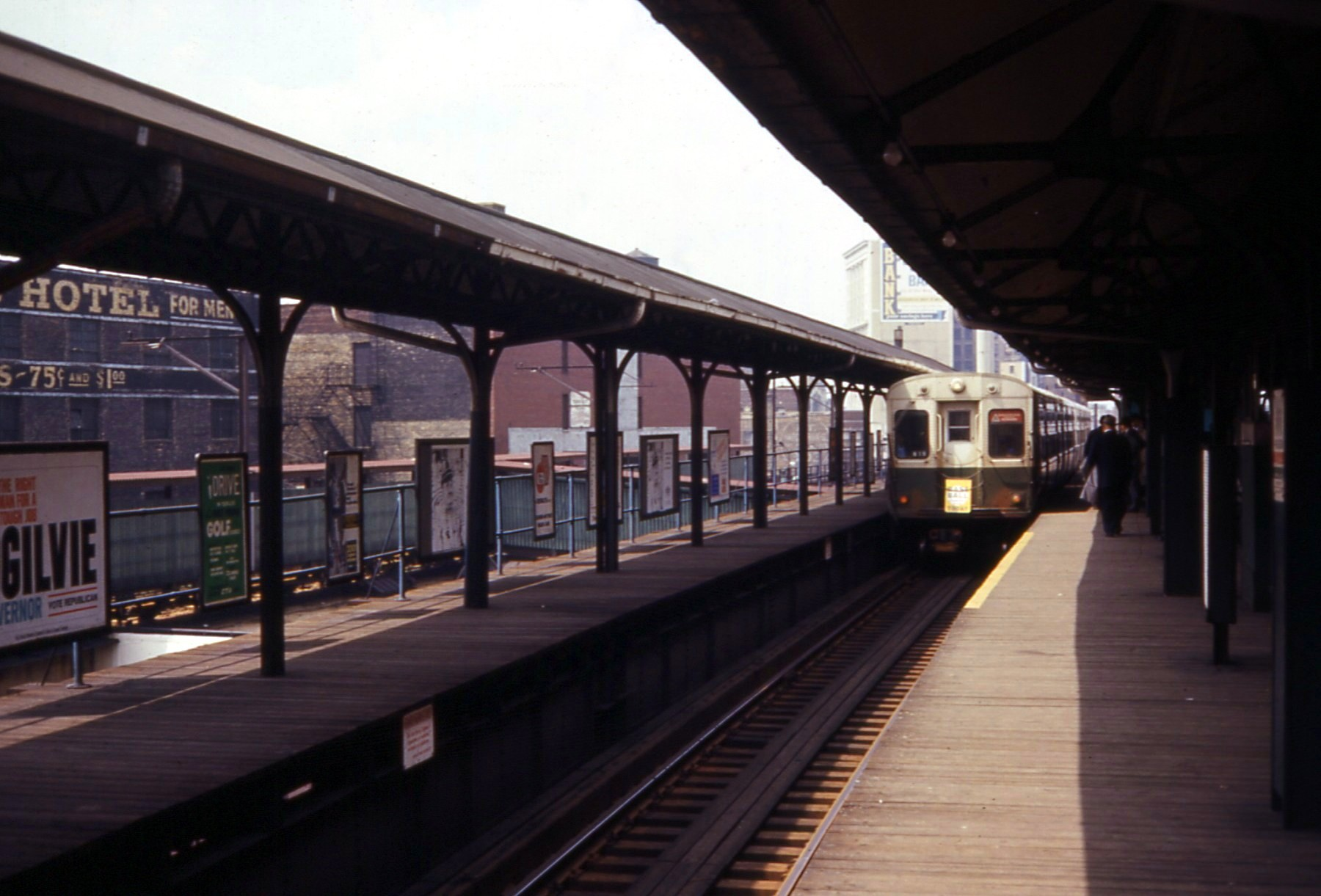
The station in 1968

The "L" station opened on May 31, 1900, as the northern terminus of the Northwestern Elevated Railroad. It was converted to a two level station in 1907, with a loop track to aid turning trains. Wilson became a through station in 1908 when the Northwestern Elevated Railroad was extended to Central in Evanston via C&E tracks belonging to the Chicago, Milwaukee and St. Paul Railway.

The extended right-of-way allowed for a retail structure partially beneath the elevated tracks, which was designed by Frank Lloyd Wright in 1909, known as the Stohr Arcade Building. This structure only lasted until its razing in 1922. The Stohr Arcade Building included "design themes that are reminiscent of the Robie House designed three years earlier".

The previous station building, known as the Gerber Building, was built in 1923, shortly after the tracks to the north were elevated; the McJunkin Building across was then used to access the Lower station platforms. Over the years the station has been extensively reconfigured: the lower level was closed on August 1, 1949; the platforms were reconfigured in 1960; and the North Shore Line—which also used the station—ceased operation in 1963, enabling the station layout to be simplified.

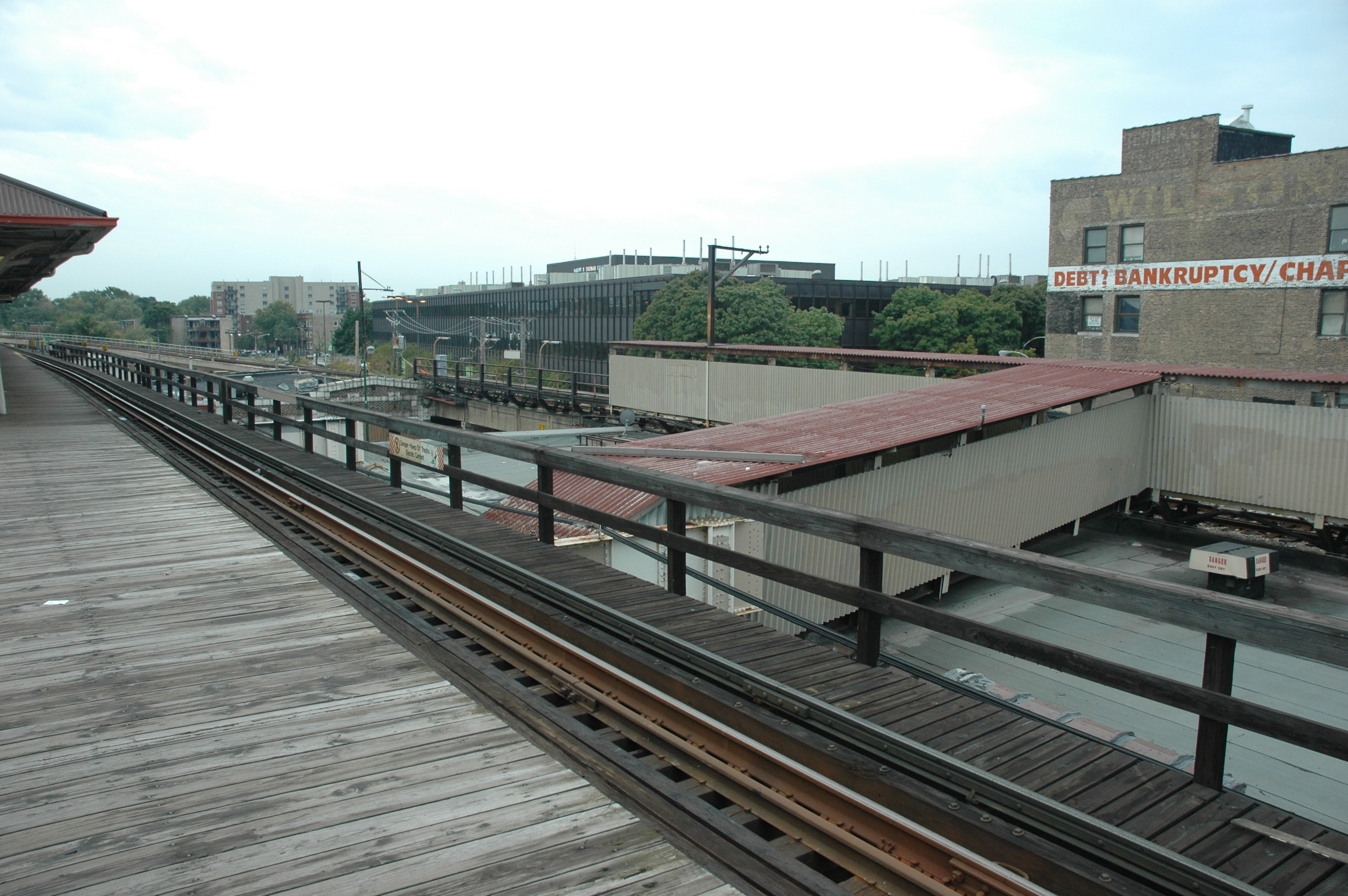
Looking southwest at the auxiliary platform, October 2007

A yard and shops were built adjacent to the station in 1901, these continued in use until the Howard Yard was expanded in 1993. The shop building was badly damaged in a fire on October 26, 1996, and the site was cleared soon after. This site remained empty for several years with plans for development in place. As of 2011, an Aldi store, a Target store, and residences now occupy this area.

=== Stub track ===
An elevated stub line from the station is a remnant of a connection into the former Buena Interchange Yard, where freight was exchanged with the Chicago, Milwaukee and St. Paul Railway. The CTA stopped carrying freight in 1973 and the stub has since been demolished south of Montrose Avenue. In 2010, further demolition split the remaining stub into two sections to allow for new Truman College construction.

=== Wilson Station Reconstruction Project ===
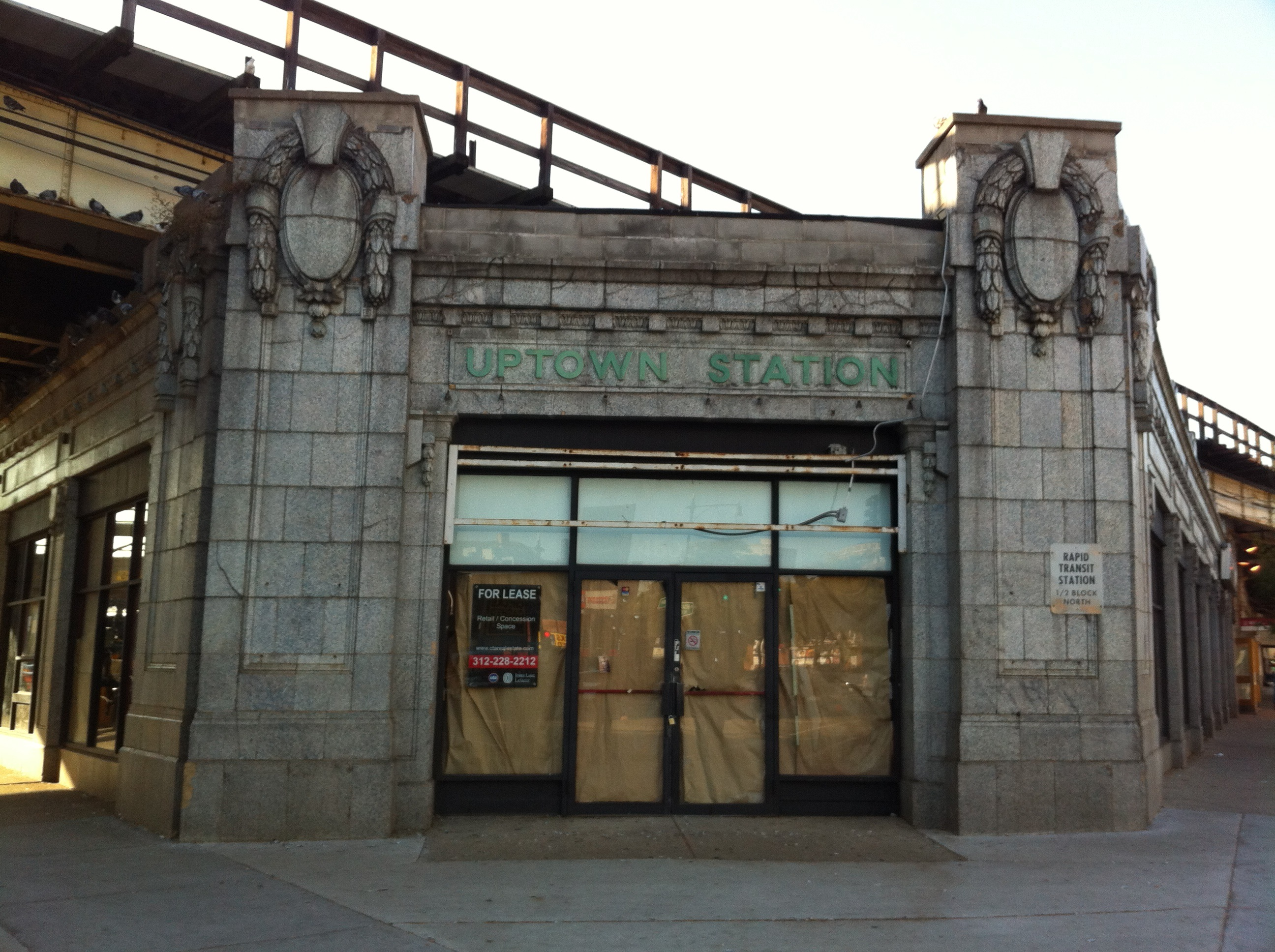
The Wilson station house in 2011, before it was restored

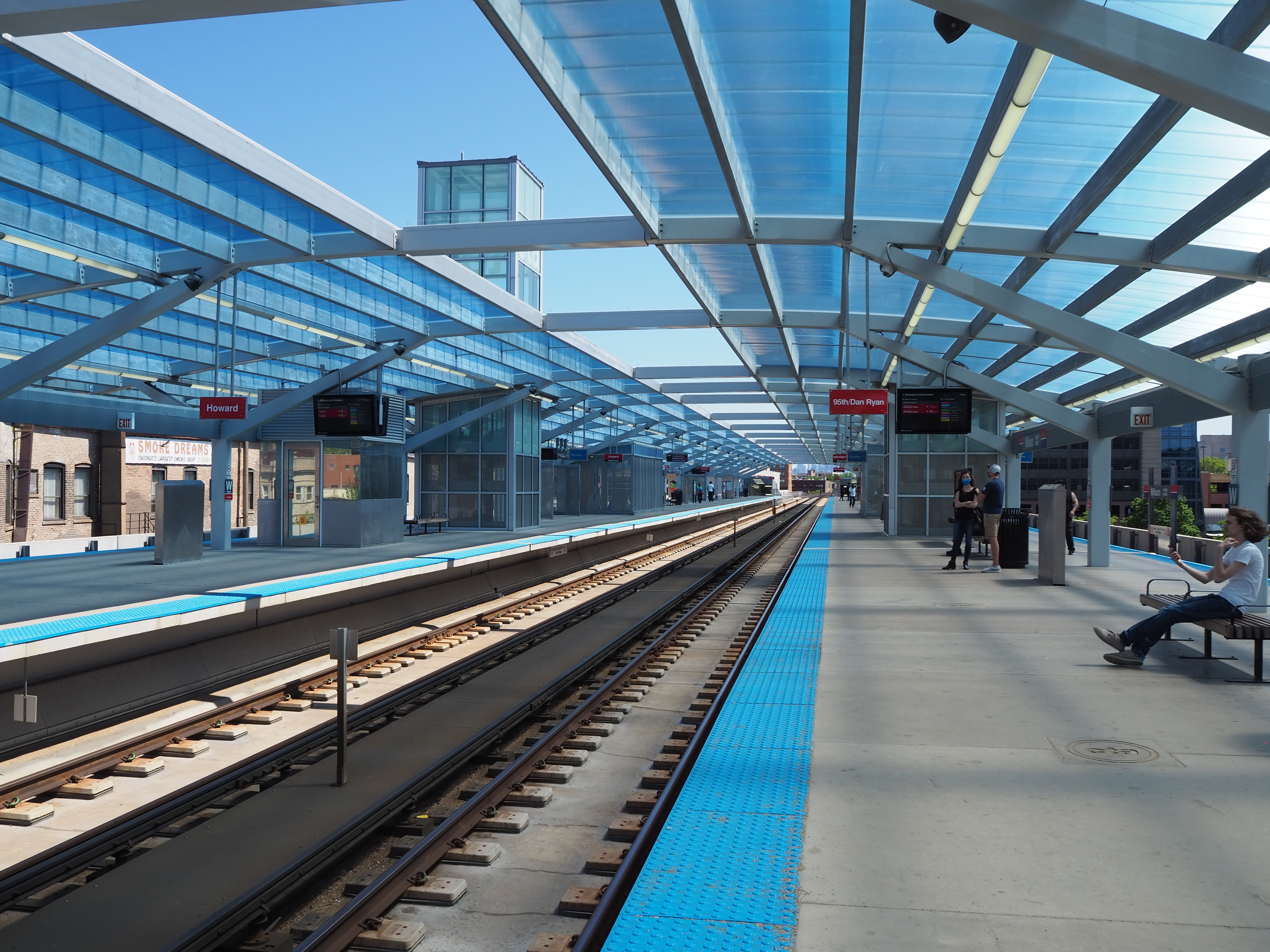
The platform and tracks in 2020

The CTA's 2004–2008 Capital Improvement Plan included plans to reconstruct the station starting in 2008. In 2012, the CTA began planning to reconstruct the station to create a transfer point between Red and Purple Line Express trains (the only one since express service was discontinued in 1976). The rebuilt station has a new main station entrance on the south side of Wilson, elevators, escalators, wider stairwells, additional turnstiles, new lights, new signage, additional bike parking, new security cameras, new train trackers, two island platforms to provide cross platform transfers between the two lines, and two auxiliary entrances: one at Sunnyside Avenue and one on the north side of Wilson. Demolition work for the project began in October 2014 and a groundbreaking ceremony was held on December 8, 2014. The station remained open during reconstruction.

Demolition of track 1 (the western track) began during the weekend of March 6, 2015. As a result, southbound Purple Line Express trains shared the same track with southbound Red Line trains and stopped at Wilson, Sheridan, and Addison in the AM rush hour only. This phase lasted for one year which ended with the activation of the new track 1 and new southbound platform.

Demolition of track 2 began on March 21, 2016. Temporary entrances opened on the same day and will remain open until completion of reconstruction. In addition, the western half of the new southbound platform opened for southbound Red Line and AM rush hour Purple Line Express trains, with Purple Line Express trains bypassing Addison station once again. Northbound Red Line trains continued to use the old platform, and the western half of the old Red Line platform closed.

Demolition of track 3 and the start of construction for a new northbound platform and new stationhouse began on September 26, 2016. The remaining half of the southbound platform reopened and the old platform used by Red Line trains closed. Northbound Red Line trains will stop on the eastern half of the southbound platform until the end of the project.

Demolition of track 4 started on March 13, 2017. This phase was completed on September 20, 2017. The east platform and the auxiliary entrance on the north side of Wilson opened for service on October 23, 2017. The auxiliary entrance on Sunnyside Avenue opened for service on December 1, 2017.

On February 5, 2018, The CTA announced the completion of the project.

Station reconstruction track diagrams

Pre-existing

Phase 1

Phase 2

Phase 3

Phase 4

Pre Completion

Completed

=== Red and Purple Modernization Project ===
From May 2021 until July 2023, the two northbound tracks were taken out of service so the structure carrying those tracks could be rebuilt north of the station, with all trains running on the southbound tracks, From July 2023 until July 2025, the two southbound tracks were taken out of service so the structure carrying those tracks could be rebuilt north of the station, with all trains running on the northbound tracks. The project was completed on July 20, 2025.

== Facilities ==
The station has two island platforms serving four tracks. Red Line trains stop on the inside tracks, while Purple Line Express trains stop on the outside tracks during weekday rush hours.

== Location ==
The station is located in the Uptown neighborhood at 4620 North Broadway in Chicago, Illinois (directional coordinates 4600 north, 1100 west). It is the closest station to Harry S Truman College.

== Bus connections ==
CTA

- 36 Broadway
- 78 Montrose
