= McJunkin Building =

Building in Chicago

Coordinates: 41°57′53″N 87°39′26″W

The McJunkin Building is located in Uptown, Chicago, at the corner of Wilson Avenue and Broadway. It was constructed in 1924. It is located adjacent to the Wilson station on the Chicago "L"; prior to 1949, that station was dual-level, with a lower ground-level portion and an upper elevated portion; access to the lower portion of the station was incorporated into the McJunkin Building.
