= Buena station =

Former rapid transit station

BUENA 4200N 1100W
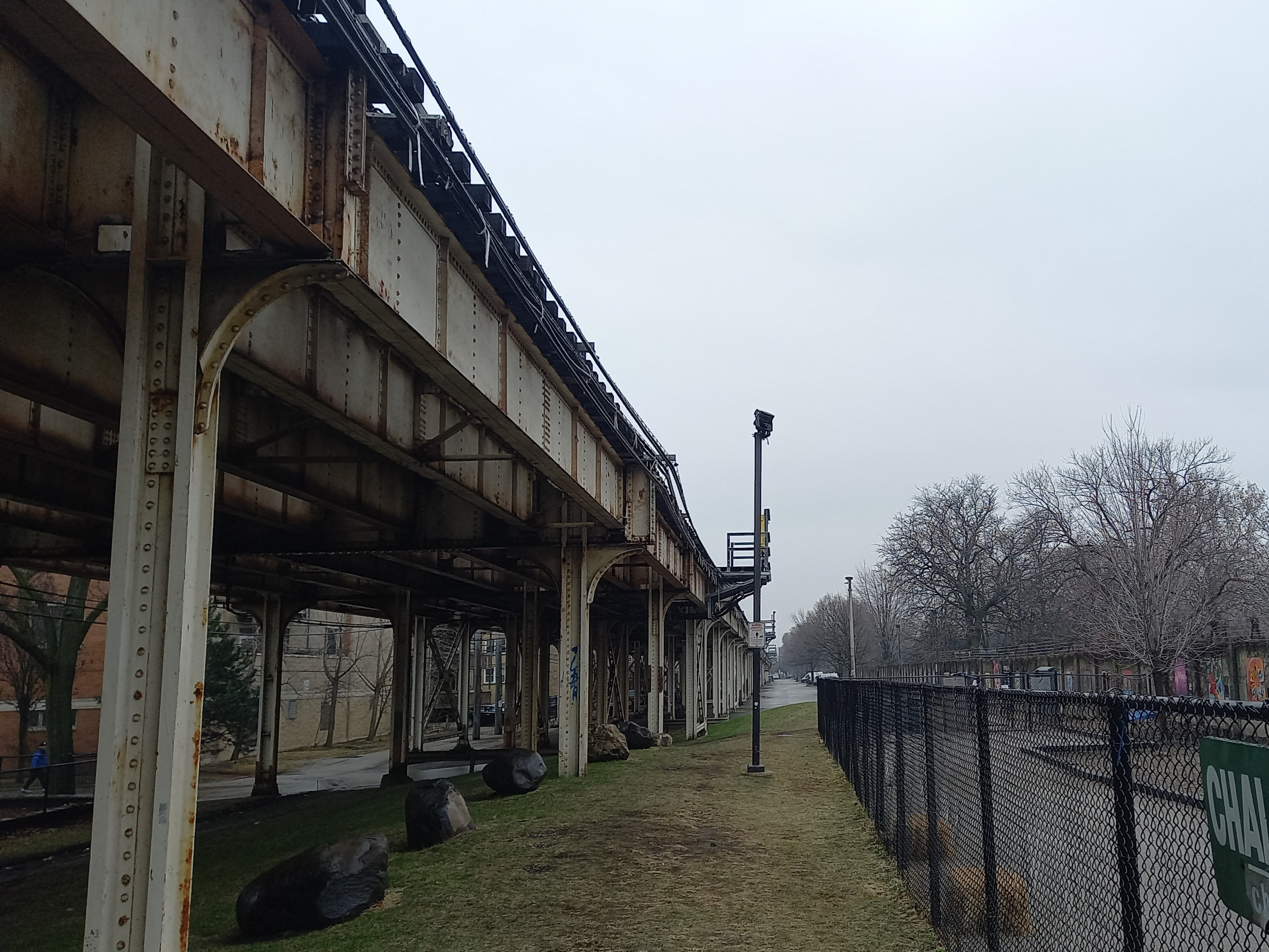
- Site of the now-demolished Buena station at Challenger Park (December 2024): Note the missing bent columns in the space where the station house once stood

General information
- Location: Buena Avenue and Kenmore Avenue; Chicago, Illinois
- Coordinates: 41.9584°N 87.6570°W
- Owner: Chicago Transit Authority
- Line: Howard Line
- Platforms: 2 side platforms
- Tracks: 4 tracks

Construction
- Structure type: Elevated

History
- Opened: May 31, 1900
- Closed: August 1, 1949

Former services
Preceding station	Milwaukee Road	Following station
Sheridan Park toward Llewellyn Park	Chicago – Evanston	Verona toward Chicago
Preceding station	Chicago "L"	Following station
Wilson toward Howard	North Side main line	Sheridan toward Loop (Randolph/Wells) or North Water Terminal
Location

Buena was a station on the Chicago Transit Authority's Howard Line, which is now part of the Red Line. The station was located at the corner of Buena and Kenmore Avenues in the Uptown neighborhood of Chicago. Buena was situated north of Sheridan and south of Wilson. Buena opened on May 31, 1900, and closed on August 1, 1949, along with 22 other stations as part of a CTA service revision.
