= Tariff (regulation) =

Business prices and terms set by a government regulator

A tariff or tariff schedule is a special type of contract between a regulatory agency, such as a public utilities commission or a government such as a municipality, and a business, to provide a product or service to the public, often in exchange for being granted an exclusive franchise to provide the tariffed product or service within an exclusive area.

Tariffs have generally been required for providers of public utilities such as water, natural gas, electricity, telephone, and cable television. They have also generally been required for such businesses as moving companies, taxicabs, and tow truck operators. In most cases, the company wanting to offer the service would obtain a franchise, granting them the exclusive right to provide the tariffed product or service to a specific area either permanently or for a specific number of years (with the right to renew).

The company intending to provide the product or service would write a legal proposal describing exactly what product(s) or service(s) were to be provided and the price(s) to be charged for them. This proposal would then be submitted to ("filed with") a regulatory agency such as a public utilities commission, or, in some cases, a municipality such as a county, city, town, or township, for approval. The proposal is a type of contact between the regulatory agency and the business providing the product of services. If the contract is approved (either with or without changes) it is considered a tariff, and the company will be permitted to provide the tariffed goods or services at the rates specified in the tariff. In many cases the granting of a tariff also granted the exclusive privilege to provide the product(s) or service(s) within a specific geographic area.

== Legal effect ==
Once approved by the relevant regulator, a tariff generally has the force and effect of a contract between the utility and the customer. Public utility commissions describe tariffs as formal filings that set out the rates, terms, and conditions under which service is provided, and as documents that define the legal obligations of both parties.

In regulated utility practice, tariffs typically include not only prices but also eligibility requirements, service classifications, rules for billing and disconnection, and other terms governing the provision of service. In this way, a tariff functions as both a rate schedule and a regulatory instrument controlling how the service may be offered to the public.

== See also ==
- Energy law
