= Isabella station =

Former station on the Chicago Transit Authority's Evanston Line

Isabella 2800N 1200W
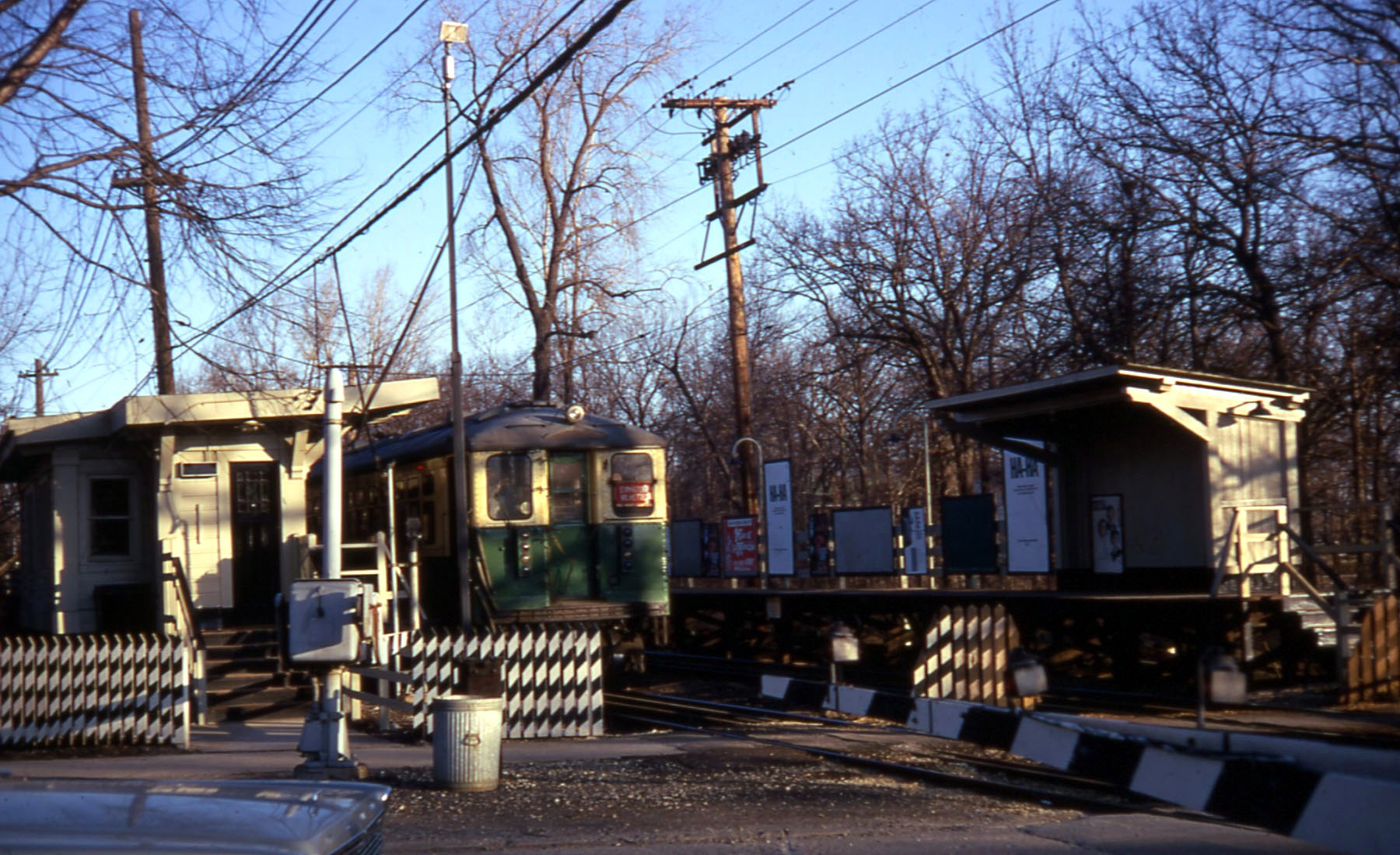
- Isabella in 1968

General information
- Location: 1215 Isabella Street; Evanston, Illinois 60201
- Coordinates: 42.0690°N 87.6885°W
- Owner: Chicago Transit Authority
- Line: Evanston Branch
- Platforms: 2 side platforms
- Tracks: 2 tracks

Construction
- Structure type: At-grade
- Platform levels: 1
- Parking: No
- Cycle facilities: No

History
- Opened: April 1, 1912; 114 years ago
- Closed: July 16, 1973; 53 years ago

Former services
| Preceding station | Chicago "L" | Following station |
|---|---|---|
| Linden Terminus | Evanston Line | Central toward Howard |
Track layout
Location

Isabella was a station on the Chicago Transit Authority's Evanston Line, now known as the Purple Line. The station was located at 1215 Isabella Street in Evanston, Illinois. Isabella opened on April 1, 1912, and closed on July 16, 1973, due to CTA service cuts and low ridership. Isabella was situated north of Central and south of Linden.

Bob Newhart disembarks from the 'L' at Isabella during the opening montage of The Bob Newhart Show.
