= Central station (CTA Purple Line) =

Chicago "L" station

Central 2600N 1000W
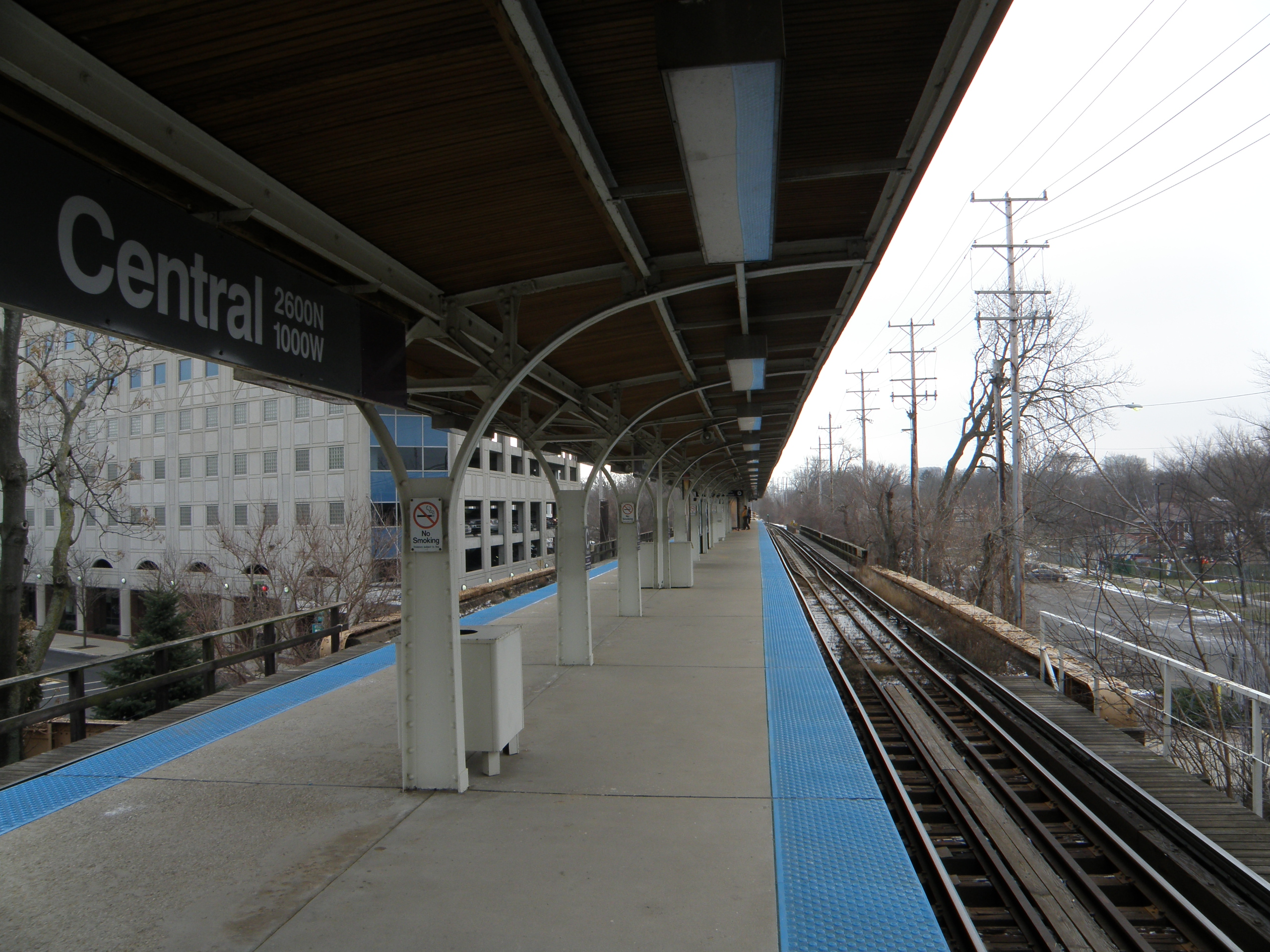

General information
- Location: 1024 Central Street; Evanston, Illinois 60201
- Coordinates: 42.063950°N 87.685742°W
- Owner: Chicago Transit Authority
- Line: Evanston Branch
- Platforms: 1 island platform
- Tracks: 2
- Connections: CTA bus

Construction
- Structure type: Elevated
- Accessible: No

History
- Opened: May 16, 1908; 118 years ago
- Rebuilt: 1931; 95 years ago

Passengers
- 2025: 144,108 ▲12.5%

Services
Preceding station	Chicago "L"	Following station
Linden Terminus	Purple Line	Noyes toward Howard or Loop (Clark/Lake)
Former services
Preceding station	Chicago North Shore and Milwaukee Railroad	Following station
Linden toward North Chicago Junction	North Shore Line Shore Line Route	Noyes toward Roosevelt Road
Preceding station	Milwaukee Road	Following station
Llewellyn Park Terminus	Chicago – Evanston	Noyes Street toward Chicago
Preceding station	Chicago "L"	Following station
Isabella Closed 1973 toward Linden	Evanston Line	Noyes toward Howard
Track layout
Location

Central is a Purple Line station of the Chicago Transit Authority 'L' system. Located at 1024 Central Street in Evanston, Illinois (directional coordinates 2600 north, 1000 west), the elevated platform sits above Central Street, half a block west of Ridge Avenue. The station itself, a Beaux-Arts structure designed by noted transit architect Arthur Gerber, is on the south side of Central Street and is entered at street level, with an auxiliary exit on the north side of the street.

== History ==
Central Avenue station opened as the northern terminal of the Northwestern Elevated Railroad on May 16, 1908.

=== Structure ===
The station was built close by to landmarks that include the Evanston Hospital and offices of NorthShore University HealthSystem, an Evanston fire station, Canal Shores Golf Course, and Chandler Newburger Recreation Center. Ryan Field, home of the Northwestern University Wildcats football team, and Welsh-Ryan Arena, home of Northwestern's basketball team, are a few blocks west of the station. Just west of Ryan Field on the north side of the street is the locally famous hot dog stand, Mustard's Last Stand. A few blocks further west is the Evanston Central Street on Metra's Union Pacific North Line. Less than a mile separate the two rail stations, though a more direct connection can be made a few stops ahead at Davis.

=== Former service ===
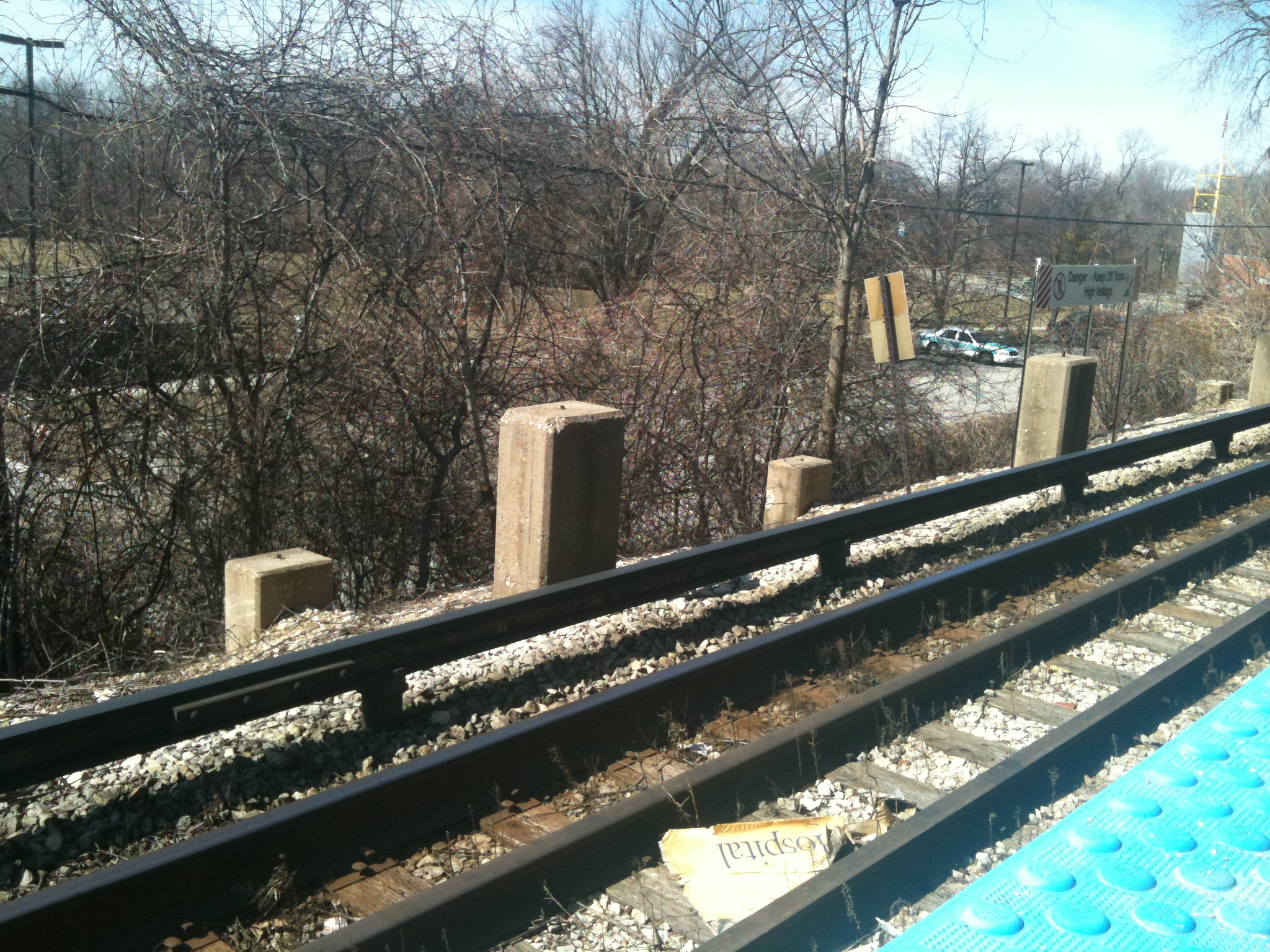
Footings for the former North Shore Line platform

Central was served by trains of the Chicago North Shore and Milwaukee Railroad on the Shore Line Route. Like Foster and Noyes, Central had an additional side platform to the west of the southbound track for exclusive use of the North Shore Line, to prevent disembarking customers from transferring to 'L' trains for free. The platform was removed sometime after the North Shore Line ceased operations over this section of the rapid transit system in 1955, but its concrete footings can still be seen opposite the current platform south of Central Street.

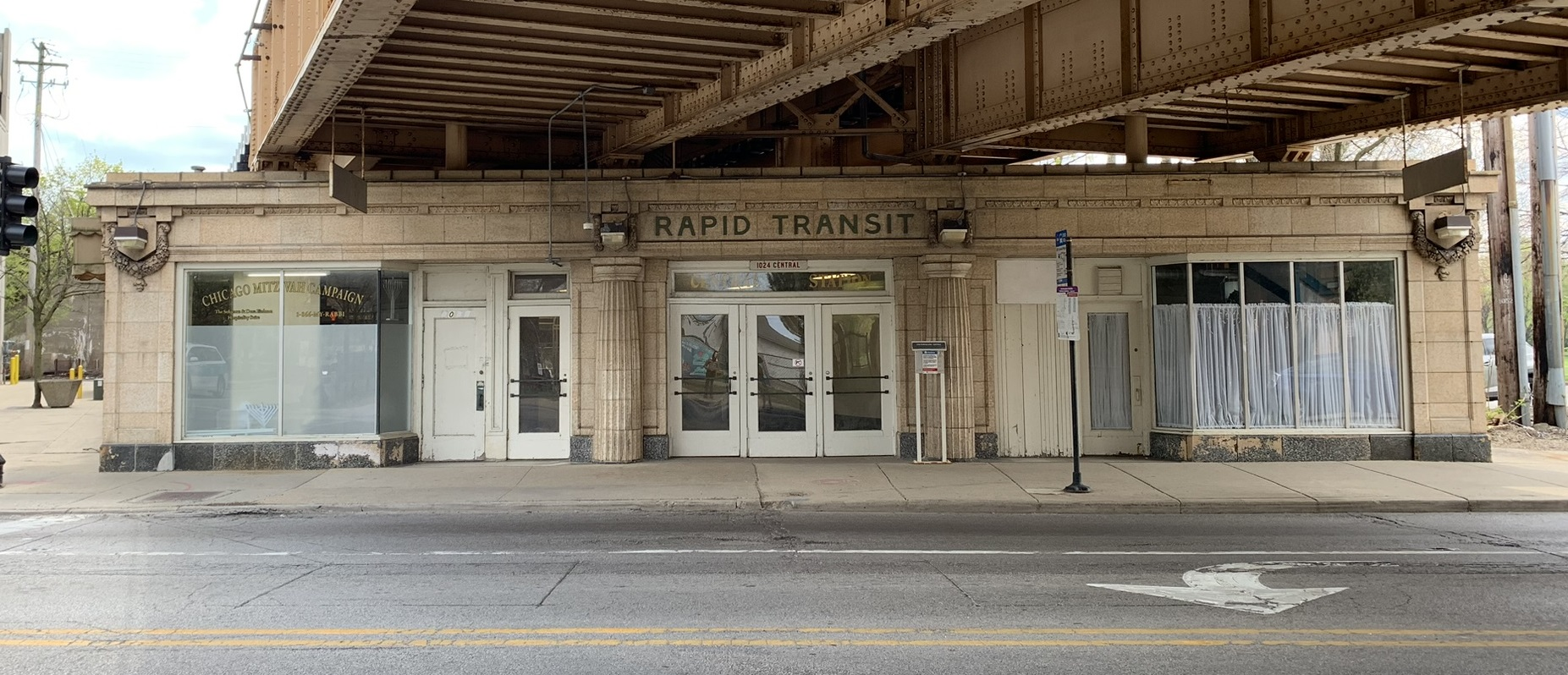
The Central station house in 2023

== Bus connections ==
CTA

- 201 Central/Ridge (Monday–Saturday only)
