= Linden station (CTA) =

Chicago "L" station

Linden 500N 400W
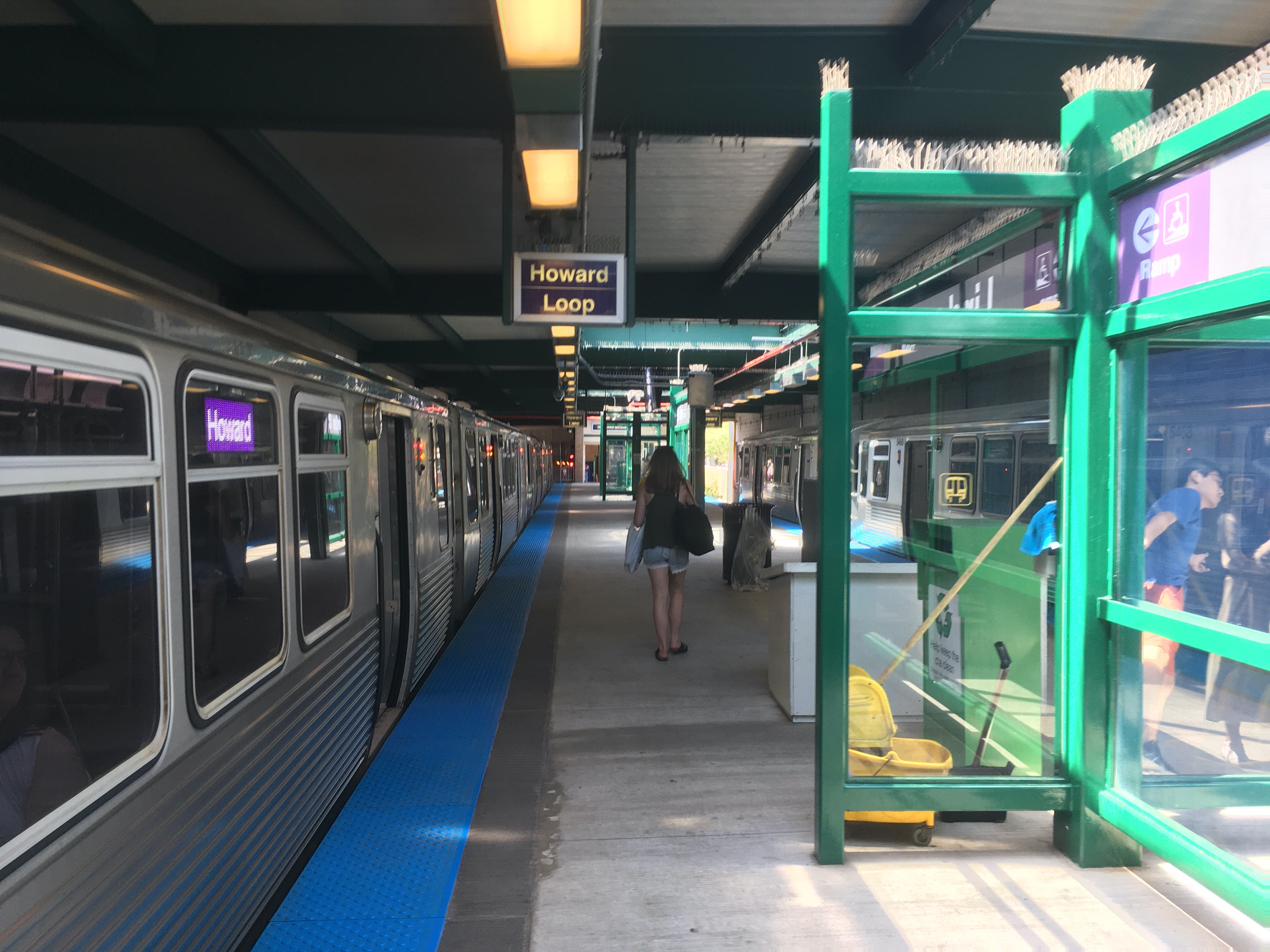
- A Howard-bound train boarding passengers

General information
- Location: 349 Linden Avenue; Wilmette, Illinois 60091
- Coordinates: 42.07379°N 87.69056°W
- Owner: Chicago Transit Authority
- Line: Evanston Branch
- Platforms: 1 island platform
- Tracks: 2

Construction
- Structure type: At-grade
- Parking: 328 spaces
- Cycle facilities: Yes
- Accessible: Yes

History
- Opened: April 2, 1912; 114 years ago
- Rebuilt: 1991–1993; 33 years ago
- Former names: Linden–Wilmette (station sign)

Passengers
- 2025: 183,873 ▲7.2%

Services
Preceding station	Chicago "L"	Following station
Terminus	Purple Line	Central toward Howard or Loop (Clark/Lake)
Former services
Preceding station	Chicago "L"	Following station
Terminus	Evanston Line	Isabella Closed 1973 toward Howard
Preceding station	Chicago North Shore and Milwaukee Railroad	Following station
Wilmette toward Milwaukee	North Shore Line Shore Line Route	Central toward Roosevelt Road
- Linden Avenue Terminal
- U.S. National Register of Historic Places
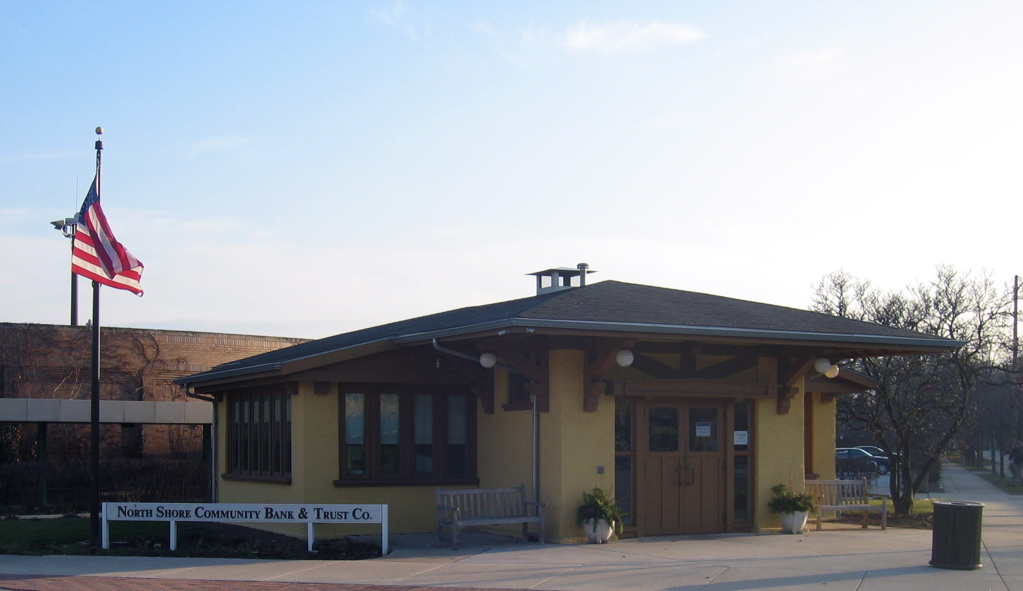
- The original Linden station
- Built: 1912
- Architect: Arthur Gerber
- Architectural style: Prairie School
- NRHP reference No.: 84001002
- Added to NRHP: 1984
Track layout
Location

Linden is an 'L' station and the northern terminus of CTA's Purple Line. The station is located at 349 Linden Avenue in Wilmette, Illinois.

== History ==
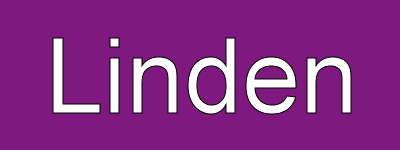
Linden destination sign

The Northwestern Elevated Railroad's extension into Wilmette had been blocked by residents worried about picnic traffic at the new terminal, and construction of the new tracks and terminal were hurriedly carried out over one night with service beginning the following morning. The minimal station opened at Linden Avenue on April 2, 1912. A station house designed by Arthur Gerber was added in 1913. In 1984, it was added to the National Register of Historic Places. A new station was built close to the original station from October 1991 until September 1993; the original station house has since been converted into retail space.

== Location ==
The station is located at 349 Linden Avenue in Wilmette, Illinois. It is the northernmost 'L' station in the CTA system, and it is the only remaining station on the Purple Line at ground level after the line descends from the elevated embankment shortly after crossing the North Shore Channel and entering Wilmette. An older station structure, the Linden Avenue Terminal, remains; it is listed on the National Register of Historic Places. The station is only a few blocks west of the Baháʼí House of Worship, and is about a mile east of Metra's Wilmette station. Linden Yard is a small train yard adjacent to the station.

== Bus connections ==
Pace

- 421 Wilmette Avenue (weekday rush hours only)
- 422 Linden CTA/Glenview/Northbrook Court (weekdays only)
- 423 Linden CTA/The Glen/Harlem CTA (weekdays only)
