= Martin Stadium (Northwestern University) =

Sports facility in Illinois, US

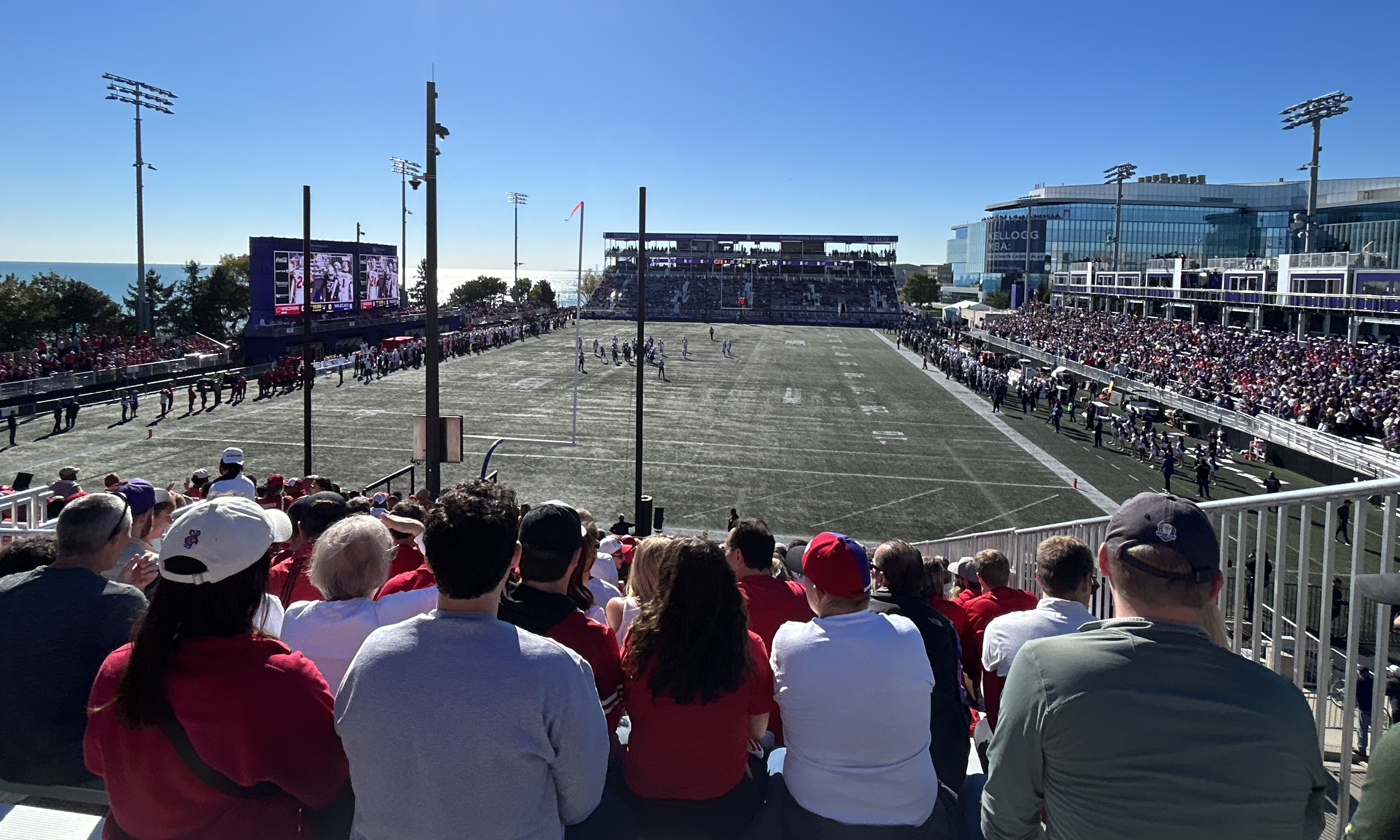
- View from north during the 2024 season

- Location within the United States Location within Illinois
- Interactive map of Martin Stadium
- Full name: Northwestern Medicine Field at Martin Stadium
- Address: 2235 Campus Drive
- Location: Northwestern University; Evanston, Illinois, U.S.
- Coordinates: 42.058°N 87.671°W
- Elevation: 590 feet (180 m) AMSL
- Owner: Northwestern University
- Operator: Northwestern University Athletics
- Capacity: 2,000 (1997–2024); 12,023 (2024–present)
- Type: Stadium
- Surface: Artificial turf (current); Natural grass (former)
- Current use: Football, soccer, lacrosse, rugby union, ultimate frisbee
- Public transit: Purple at Noyes; CTA Route 201 at Sheridan & Lincoln and Sheridan & Haven

Construction
- Opened: 1997 (29 years ago)
- Renovated: 2016, 2024
- Architects: HOK and 360 Architecture (2016); InProduction (2024)

Tenant
- Northwestern Wildcats (NCAA) teams: football (2024–2026); men's and women's soccer (1997–present); women's lacrosse (1997–present); Professional teams: Chicago Tempest (WER) (2025); Chicago Union (UFA) (2024–2025); Chicago Stars FC (NWSL) (2026–present)

Website
- nusports.com/martin-stadium

Lanny and Sharon Martin Stadium (currently known as Northwestern Medicine Field at Martin Stadium for sponsorship reasons) is an outdoor stadium on the campus of Northwestern University in Evanston, Illinois, United States. It is home to the Northwestern Wildcats soccer and lacrosse teams, the Chicago Stars FC of the National Women's Soccer League, and the Chicago Tempest of Women's Elite Rugby. From 2024 to 2026, the stadium was also the temporary home of the Northwestern Wildcats football team.

The venue was opened in 1997 along the shore of Lake Michigan on the northeast end of the campus, adjacent to several other university athletic facilities and the Kellogg Global Hub academic building. It is a component of the university's Lakefront Athletics and Recreation Complex, which also features Lakeside Field (a field hockey venue), Norris Aquatics Center, Henry Crown Sports Pavilion, Combe Tennis Center, Ryan Fieldhouse (indoor football practice facility), Walter Athletics Center, and the currently disused Hutcheson Field outdoor football practice field. The venue was enlarged in mid-2024 to accommodate the interim tenancy of the football program during the demolition of Ryan Field, which was replaced in 2026 by a new stadium at the site.

== Original construction, early use ==
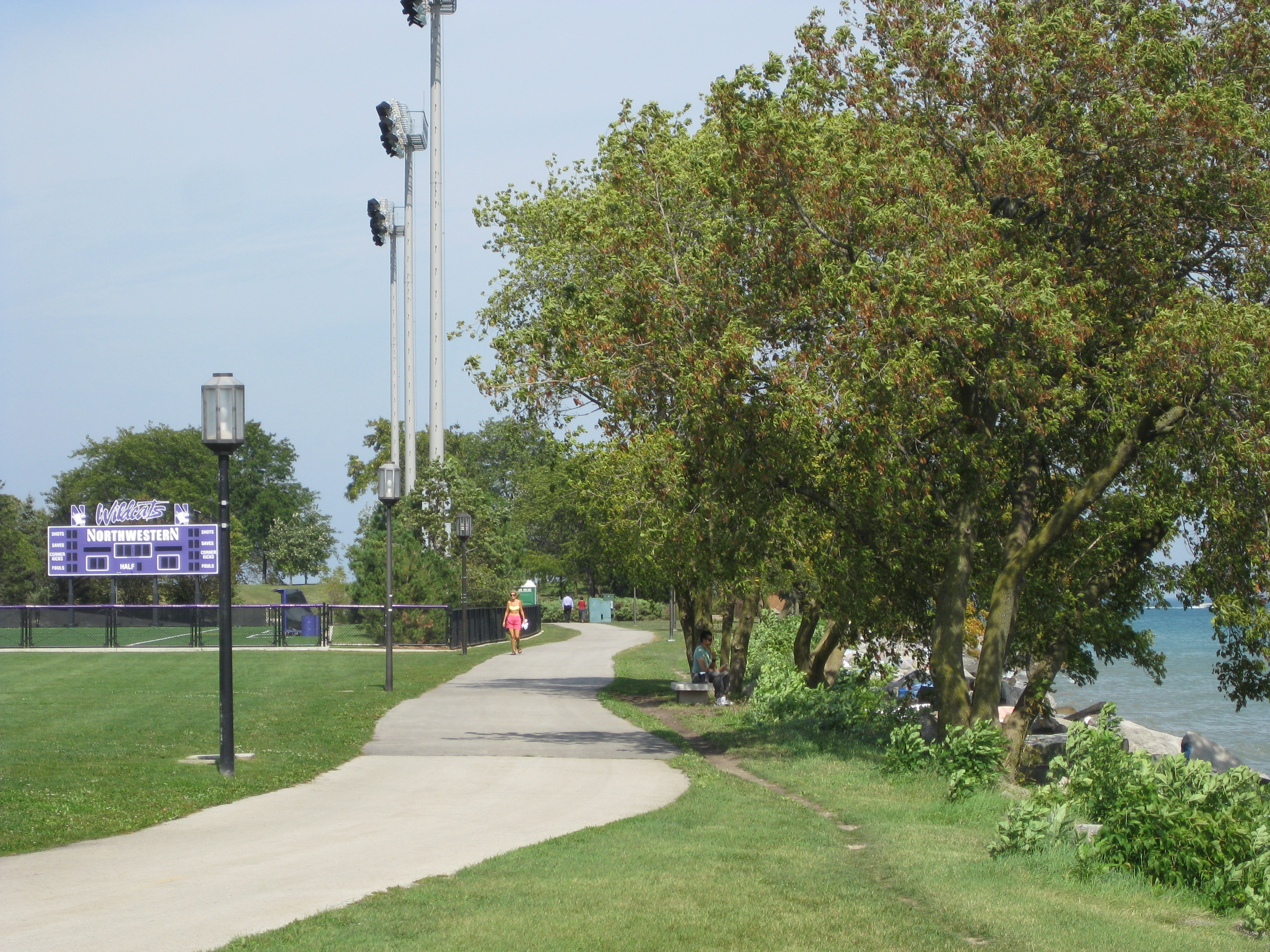
2010 photograph of the venue (captured facing north)

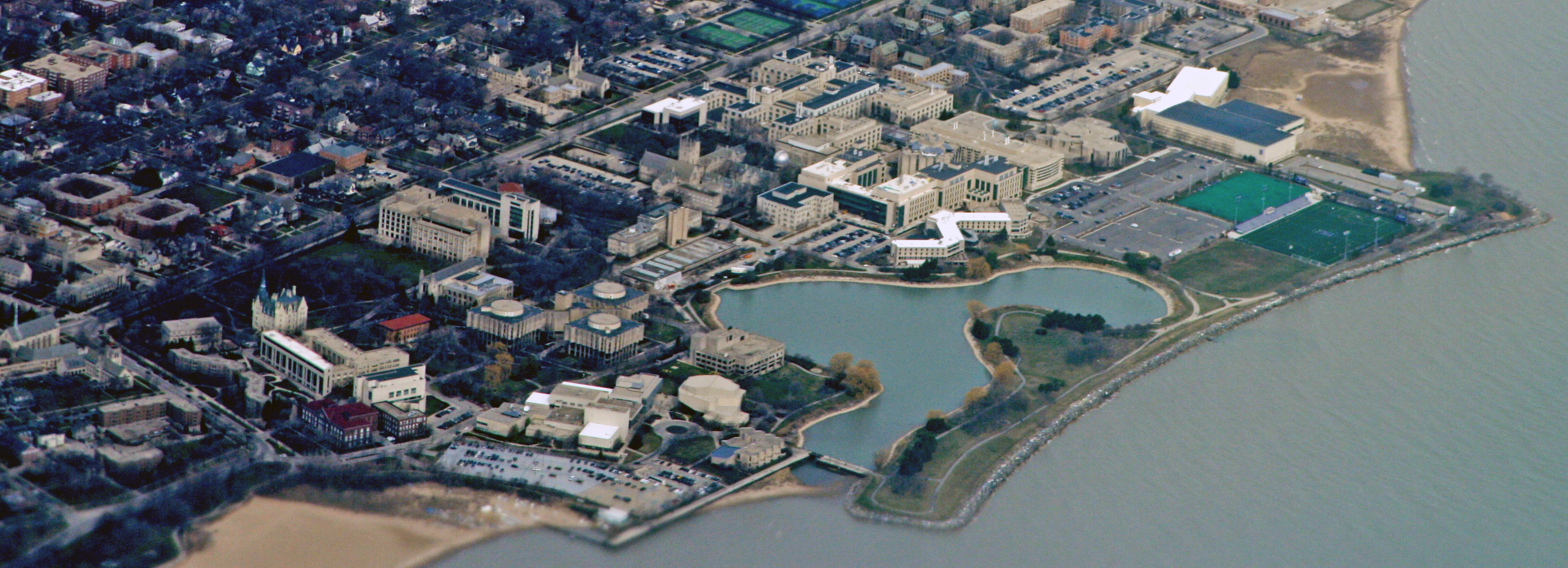
2009 aerial photograph of Martin Stadium and other lakefront facilities

The venue traces back to the soccer and lacrosse field of the facility built in 1997 as part of what was originally known as the "Leonard B. Thomas Sports Complex". The two-field sports complex (also featuring the adjacent field hockey field) was constructed at a cost of $3.5 million on the north end of the university's main campus in Evanston, Illinois, in order to provide home fields for Northwestern University's soccer, lacrosse, and field hockey programs on the main campus. Soccer and lacrosse shared the venue, built as a grass sports field in the complex. Field hockey was given a separate dedicated venue designed to the particular specifications of field hockey. Previously, sports like soccer had played home games at Ryan Field football stadium, which had an oversized seating capacity for the needs of such sports.

The site of the venue has provided spectators with views of the adjacent Lake Michigan and distant views of the Chicago skyline. Prior to its 2016 renovation, the soccer and lacrosse field was referred to as "Lakeside Field", a name also used for the adjacent field hockey venue. It had a capacity of 2,000 spectators.

The venue was the site of the Big Ten men's soccer tournament in 1998, 2005, and 2012.

== 2016 renovation ==
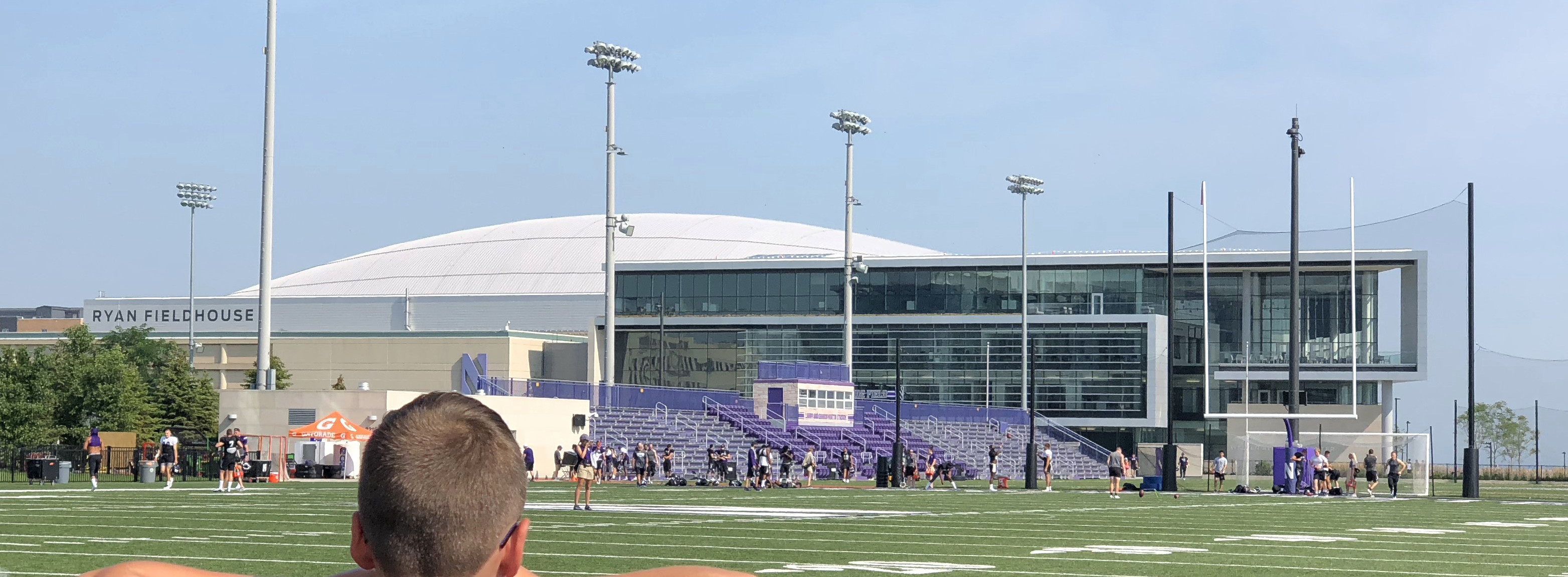
Martin Stadium grandstand photographed in 2018 (captured facing north, with the former Hutcheson Field football practice field in the foreground; and with the Walter Athletics Center and Ryan Fieldhouse in the background)

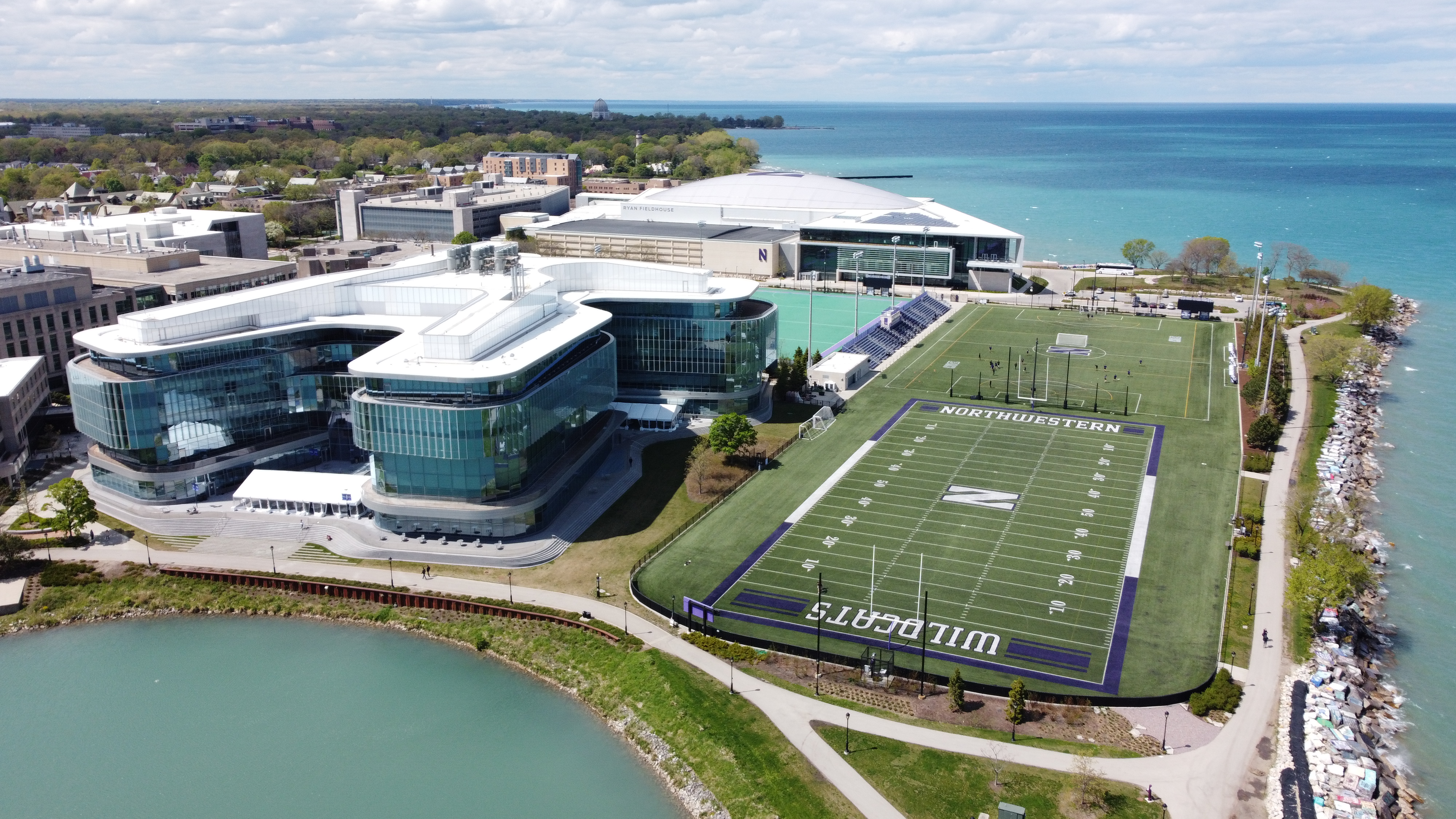
2021 aerial view of Martin Field (behind football practice field), other Lakefront Athletics and Recreation Complex venues, and the surrounding area of the university campus

Both the soccer and lacrosse field, as well as the adjacent field hockey facility, were renovated in 2016 as part of a renovation of the lakefront athletics complex that also included the addition of an outdoor practice field for the school's football program. The football practice field, named Chap and Ethel Hutcheson Field (also known as Hutcheson Field), was built just to the south of the renovated soccer facility along the lakefront, and was built to also be utilized by club sports teams in addition to the football program. The renovations of the lakefront fields was part of the university's "We Will" campaign of investment in its athletic facilities. The newly renovated soccer and lacrosse venue was renamed "Lanny and Sharon Martin Stadium" after J. Landis "Lanny" Martin (a trustee and alumnus of the university) and his wife Sharon Martin, who together had served as co-chairs of the campaign's fundraising efforts and had contributed $15 million to it.

HOK and 360 Architecture were the lead architects of the facilities renovation project. The renovations added lighting upgrades, and new video equipment. The renovated soccer and lacrosse venue continued to have a permanent capacity of 2,000 seated spectators, and featured a single small video board (located in its northeast corner). It reopened on March 8, 2016, with a women's lacrosse match against Marquette.

After its 2016 renovation, the stadium was the location of the Big Ten women's lacrosse tournament both in 2016 and 2024.

== Temporary use as college football stadium (2024–2026) ==
On April 10, 2024, the university announced that a temporary facility would be constructed as part of the complex to serve as the football team's home stadium for the 2024 and 2025 seasons while a replacement for Ryan Field is built. During its use as an interim football stadium, the facility is known for sponsorship reasons as "Northwestern Medicine Field at Martin Stadium", with Northwestern Medicine signing a two-year exclusive naming rights partnership in August 2024 for the branding of the stadium. In addition to the school's football team, its soccer teams and lacrosse program continue to play at the venue.

Plans were that after the 2025 season, the stadium was to be significantly downsized with potential long-term enhancements made to benefit the sports teams that will continue to utilize the venue. However, this was extended, with the stadium hosting the first two home games of the 2026 football season.

=== Logistics ===
==== Background and planning ====
With Ryan Field demolished for the construction of a replacement stadium (New Ryan Field) at the same location, the football team needed to find a temporary venue to play for two seasons. The university quickly began demolition on their previous stadium soon after receiving approval to, so as to preempt allowing time for any further legal challenges that could delay the project's initiation. The start of demolition came prior to arrangements being made for where the team would play during construction.

Before settling on plans to use Martin Stadium, several venues in the Chicago region were looked at as options. These were assessed as presenting too far of commutes from the Evanston campus for athletes and student fans. One was SeatGeek Stadium, a stadium which had been originally built for Major League Soccer. SeatGeek featured adequate facilities to serve as a temporary home venue, and a larger capacity than the temporary setup that Martin Stadium offers. However, its distance from the university's Evanston campus (a 45 minute to hour drive, using highways) made it an unideal option. Soldier Field (the stadium of the NFL's Chicago Bears and the MLS's Chicago Fire FC) was considered, but presented scheduling concerns as the Bears' 2024 schedule had not yet been finalized and the Chicago Fire's games would also present further scheduling challenges. It was also judged as presenting too far a commute from the Evanston campus. Guaranteed Rate Field (home stadium of the MLB's Chicago White Sox) was considered to be overly-remote from Evanston. While closer, Wrigley Field (home of the MLB's Chicago Cubs) was also judged as being too far removed from campus to serve as a season-long home venue.

The football program's plans for a temporarily expanded Martin Stadium were found to be feasible for meeting the needs of gameday logistics and requirements for television broadcasts. These plans were cleared for action once the team received needed approvals from the NCAA, the Big Ten Conference, and the city of Evanston to play their games at the stadium. There was a limited timeframe in which the plans could be executed, with preparation beginning in early June 2024 and the first scheduled football home game at the venue taking place on August 31. As a result, the expanded seating of the venue was erected over the course of only approximately 60 days.

Head football coach David Braun and his family gave what was described to be "a major six-figure contribution" to the university to help fund the project of expanding Martin Stadium.

==== Seating and other aspects of the stadium ====
The temporary enlargement of the venue to accommodate football games was overseen by InProduction, company which specializes in erecting temporary seating structures for sports events such as Formula 1 races and golf tournaments, and which had previously built temporary bleachers at Kidd Brewer Stadium (for Appalachian State Mountaineers football) and Clarence T. C. Ching Athletics Complex (for Hawaii Rainbow Warriors football).

Due to each sideline being space-confined, the sideline grandstands are more shallow in depth than the temporary endzone grandstands are. Parts of the temporary endzone grandstands sit atop of a former football practice field and a parking lot. The initial target capacity for the temporary venue was to hold somewhere around 15,000 spectators. However, when it opened for the 2024 season its official capacity was even lower, at only 12,023. Northwestern Athletics noted that there would be the ability to potentially enlarge the capacity for the 2026 season including by adding as many as 3,000 more seats to the venue by placing more seating in the stadium's corners and under its score boards.

View of the western grandstand (with Lakeside Field and the Kellogg Global Hub visible behind it)

The expansion of the venue included dismantling and rebuilding the existing grandstand structure on the west sideline of the field. This was done in order to add additional seating as well as a mezzanine level and press box on that side of the venue. The scale of what could be added on the west sideline was limited, due to spatial limitations created by the proximity of the neighboring Lakeside Field field hockey venue. Northwestern Athletics regarded any plan that would require to uproot its championship field hockey program from their own facility to be non-starter, thus the enlarged western grandstand could not be extended much further back than the existing grandstand extended. Most of the seating along the west sideline includes 2,500 bleacher-style bench seats. Above this is a 200-capacity premium mezzanine seating section that has been nicknamed a "loft level", featuring barstools and chair-backed seats for its ticketed spectators. The Northwestern home team bench is located along the west sideline.

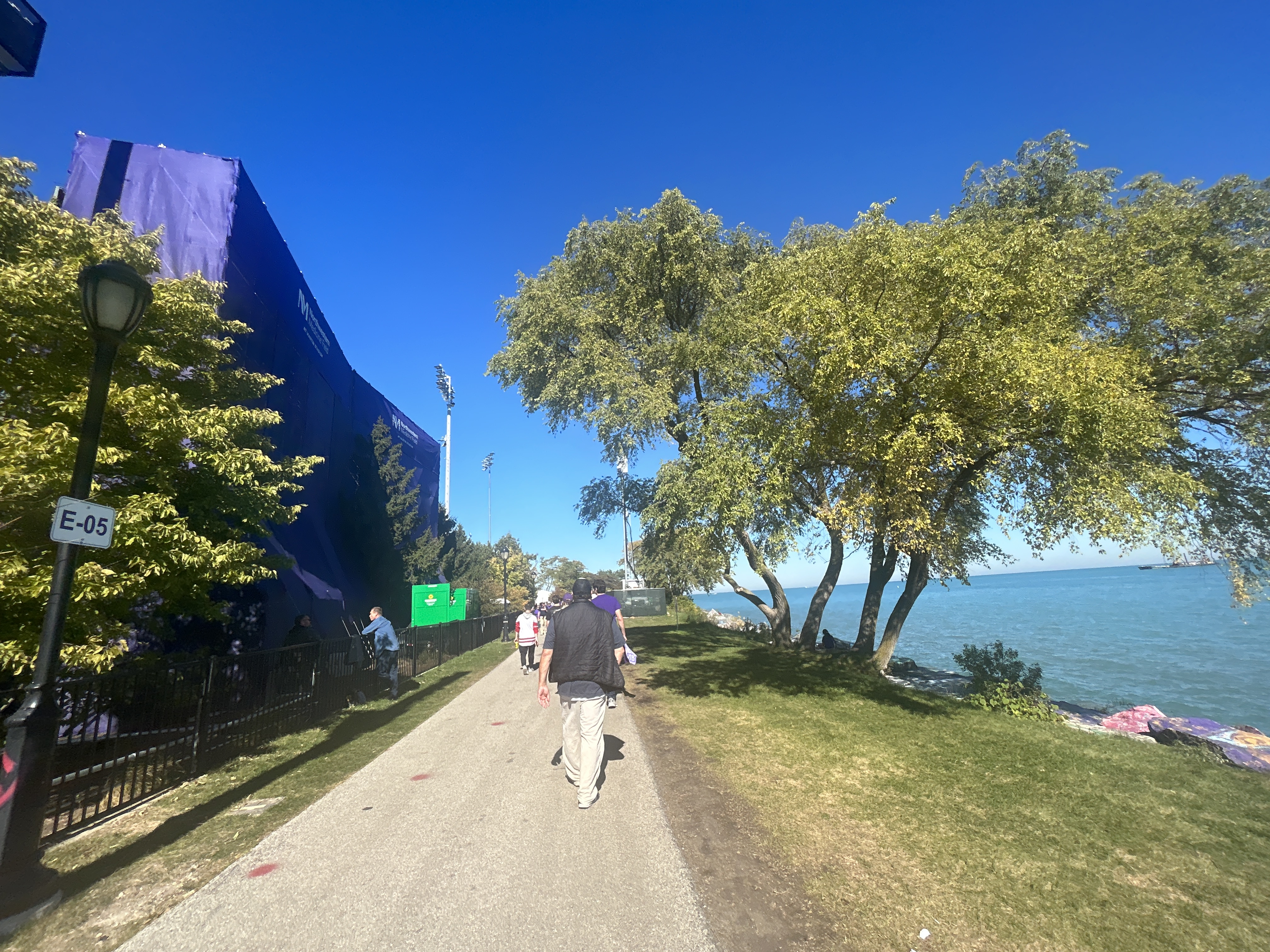
East grandstand and video screen structure viewed from the lakefront trail, demonstrating its proximity to Lake Michigan

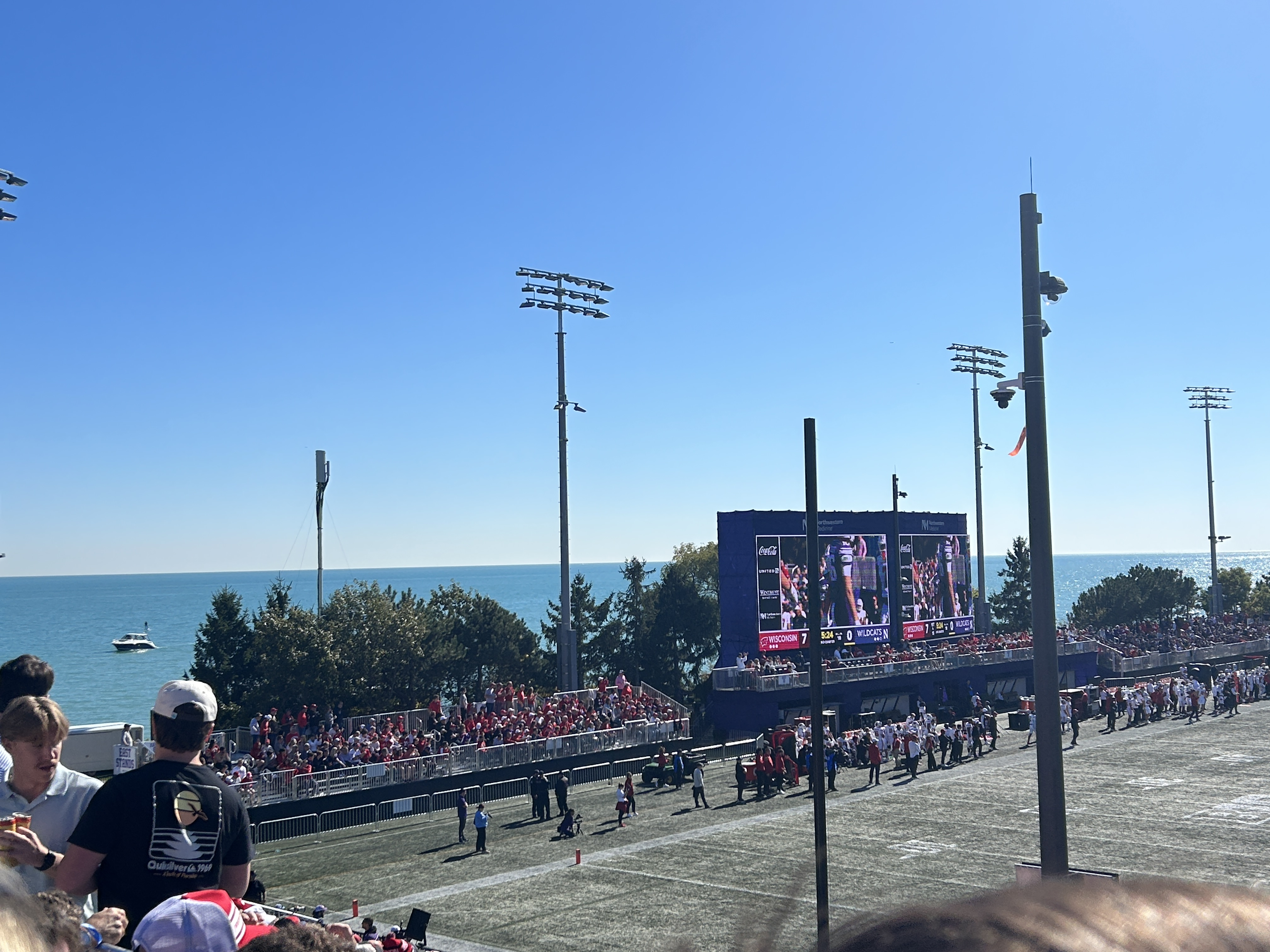
View of the east grandstand

A second sideline grandstand was added on the east sideline of the playing surface, the side of the venue which abuts the lake, and is the side in which the visiting team bench is located along. This grandstand contains 1,200 bleacher-style bench seats. The size of what could be constructed along the east sideline was confined by the limited amount of room between the playing surface and the lake. The east stands are very near to the lake, with their last row of seats being located roughly 50 feet (15 m) from the water.

The temporary south endzone grandstand contains both general admission and premium seating, and extends far further-back than the sidelines do. The south endzone has two suite levels, with a total of sixteen suites. It also features club seats, and a field-level premium loge seating section. With its many premium seats, the South grandstand generates the most revenue. Its first row is a field-level premium loge seating section that has twenty sets of four-seat tables (with cushioned seats) that are elevated only 2 feet (0.61 m) above the playing surface. Behind this are rows of general admission seats, beyond which there are several rows of cushioned premium club seating. Behind the club seating are club dining areas (which contain the all-inclusive dining offered to club section seatholders) and the premium suites. Each premium suite is open-air, and offers seating for either 11 or 14 spectators.

The 5,000 seat temporary north endzone grandstand features sections for marching band stands and the student sections of both Northwestern and visiting teams during football games. All seating in this section is bleacher-style bench seating. For the 2025 season, the home team football student section in this grandstand was shifted to the west end of the grandstand, situating Northwestern students closer to where players enter the stadium and closer to the sideline where Northwestern's bench is located.

Despite the expanded venue having a much lower overall capacity than the former Ryan Field had, its premium seating areas have far more seats than the premium areas of the former Ryan Field had offered in its sole premium section (a 350-seat skybox). Since premium seating areas generate larger revenue, this has allowed Northwestern to generate greater per-game revenue during its 2024 season home games at Martin Stadium than it had in its 2023 season home games at the former Ryan Field.

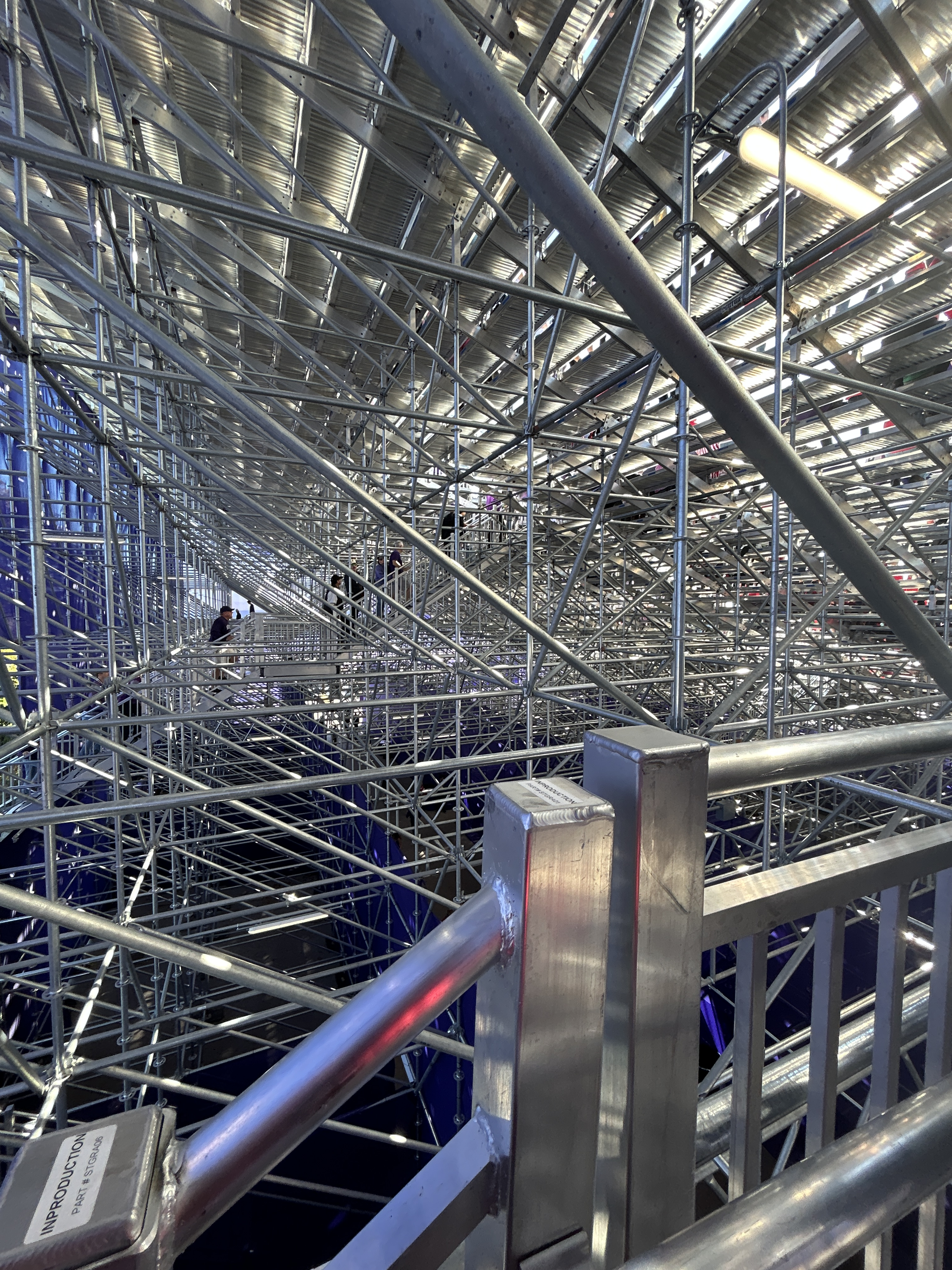
Scaffolding under the temporary south grandstand

The existing turf at the venue was maintained, with minor augmentations made to allow it to accommodate the teams of all three sports that will be using it. The turf was replaced in 2026 in a sparsely advertised upgrade, meant to prepare the stadium for the start of the 2026 football season and the arrival of the Chicago Stars. IronTurf, a turf company that serves high schools and other colleges, was used. Video boards were installed in the south end zone and along the eastern sideline. The quality of the venue's audio proved somewhat an issue at times during the 2024 stadium due to the large amount of wind sometimes present at the lakeside venue and the lack of large stands to trap noise inside the venue. Northwestern claimed to have worked to improve that aspect of the venue experience ahead of the 2025 season.

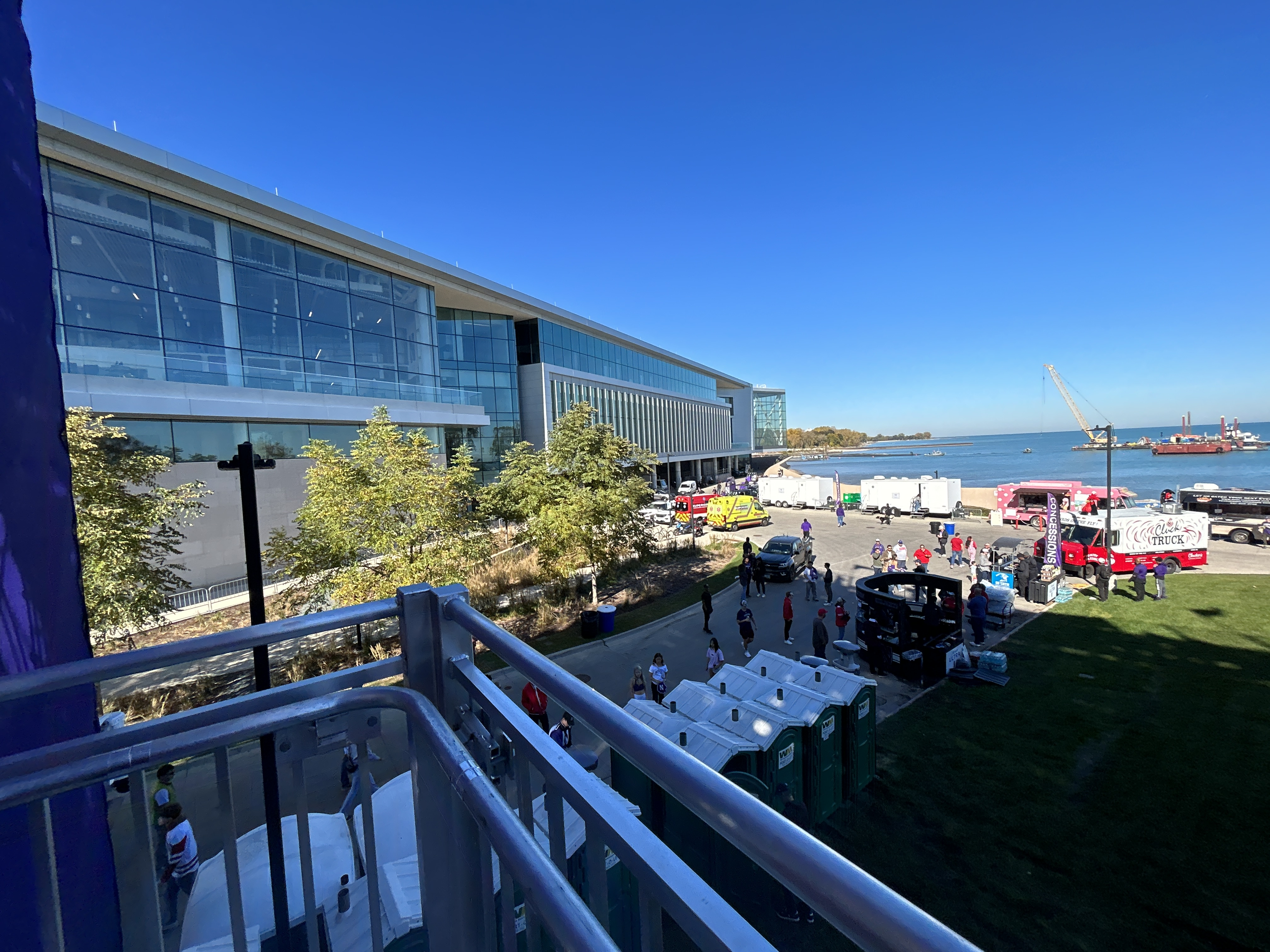
View (from stairs to north grandstand) of concessions and porta-poties behind the north grandstand (and adjacent to the Walter Athletics Center and Ryan Fieldhouse)

South beer garden and concessions

Alcoholic beverages were sold at stadium concessions for football games. This was a difference from Ryan Field, which for decades had never offered in-stadium sale of alcohol. A "beer garden" area was erected behind the south grandstand structure, adjacent to that grandstand's concessions salespoint. This offered an in-stadium gathering space open to all stadium spectators, featuring patio furniture and sun umbrellas. On the stadium's south end, its concessions were sold in a structure that was dubbed the "South Concessions Pavilion". For the 2025 season, the beer garden area saw the addition of what was advertised as a new "multi-level bar and beverage structure". The beer garden also saw brunch-style beverages such as mimosas and Bloody Marys added to its offerings during daytime Saturday football games. The season also saw a new concession stand added to its northeast end offering desserts and candies, and additional food added to the South Concessions Pavilion.

The Walter Athletics Center (a $270 million football team facility located adjacent to Martin Stadium) was used to house game-day back-of-house operations, as well as the locker rooms for both Northwestern and visiting teams. Players entered and exited the stadium to/from the Walter Athletics Center in the stadium's northwest corner. A sales center for the new Ryan Field was added to the lobby of the Walter Athletics Center, featuring a model of the under-construction stadium. A similar sales center also was installed at Welsh–Ryan Arena. Ahead of the 2024 season, it was declared that there were no plans to formally use the terrace of the Walter Athletics Center nor the balcony of the Kellogg Global Hub (both of which overlook the venue) for additional ticketed spectator capacity, though the team was open to the possibility of hosting visiting athletic program recruits on the athletic center's balcony.

==== Parking, transportation, and tailgating ====
Northwestern University's main campus offers more available parking for football attendees than its Ryan Field campus did, though much of it is separated into smaller parking lots and parking structures spread apart across a greater area.

Despite there being more parking at Martin Stadium, there is a lower capacity for parking lot tailgating due to a portion of the parking on the main campus being contained within parking structures. To make up for this, portions of the open space on the adjacent Northwestern University Lakefill have been used for the "Lakeside Gameday Experience". This has been described as "tailgate village"/"tailgate zone" and beer garden which can be accessed through the purchase of a special entry ticket. The area features food and drinks available for purchase, as well as lawn games and television screens. It also features private party spaces which attendees can book use of in advance to host private pre-game parties. Those who reserve space on the Lakefill for tailgate parties have the options of either bringing their own food or taking advantage of catering options the venue offers. Northwestern compared the offering of these options to those using The Lakefill as being somewhat similar to the options offered for attendees at picnic lawns at the Ravinia Festival concert venue. Among the reservable-spaces are two 50-capacity chalets and several 10-capacity tents. For the 2025 football season, Northwestern expanded game day shuttle services to include busses traveling as far as Ryan Field's west parking lot in order to enable fans to take advantage of remote parking there.

Northwestern and Wisconsin fans at Noyes station of the CTA Purple Line after October 19, 2024, football game

Northwestern Athletics have advised the Noyes station of the CTA Purple Line as a means of traveling to the venue via rapid transit. Spectators are advised to (after exiting the station) travel east down Noyes Street until Sheridan Road, at which event-day wayfinding signage will guide them through the campus and to the stadium. Noyes station is approximately a half-mile from the venue. Northwestern Athletics recommended CTA bus route 201 as one means for those parking in the campus' south lots to get from the parking lot to the stadium, with the nearest stops to the stadium being at Sheridan & Lincoln and Sheridan & Haven.

For those wanting to arrive via Metra's Union Pacific North Line, Northwestern Athletics has advised that (as with Ryan Field) Evanston Central Street station to be the most convenient Metra station, and has stated that gameday wayfinding signage should be present to aid in finding their way to Martin Stadium. However, this Metra station is significantly further from Martin Stadium than from Ryan Field. Metra riders traveling to the station could alternatively transfer from the Metra Davis Street station to the CTA Purple Line, which has an adjacent Davis station, and from there take the Purple Line to Noyes. A Metra-Purple Line transfer also exists between the adjacent Metra station and CTA station at Main Street in Evanston.

=== Football games ===
Five home games of Northwestern's 2024 football season were played at the venue, with the final two being played at Wrigley Field (home stadium of the MLB's Chicago Cubs) in November after the conclusion of the MLB calendar. The two games held at the larger Wrigley Field were also expected to be the two home matchups that would likely be the highest draw for spectators: the team's games against Ohio State and Illinois (the latter being the in-state Big Ten rival of Northwestern). Wrigley Field had previously been used as a special venue for single select Northwestern football games in some of the team's recent seasons, including its 2023 season and its 2021 season. The team's 2025 season is also scheduled to feature five home games at the venue, with the final two home games vs. Michigan and Minnesota being played at Wrigley Field in November. Fox's Big Noon Kickoff broadcast live on Northwestern's campus ahead of the September 13, 2025, game vs. the Oregon Ducks at Martin Stadium.

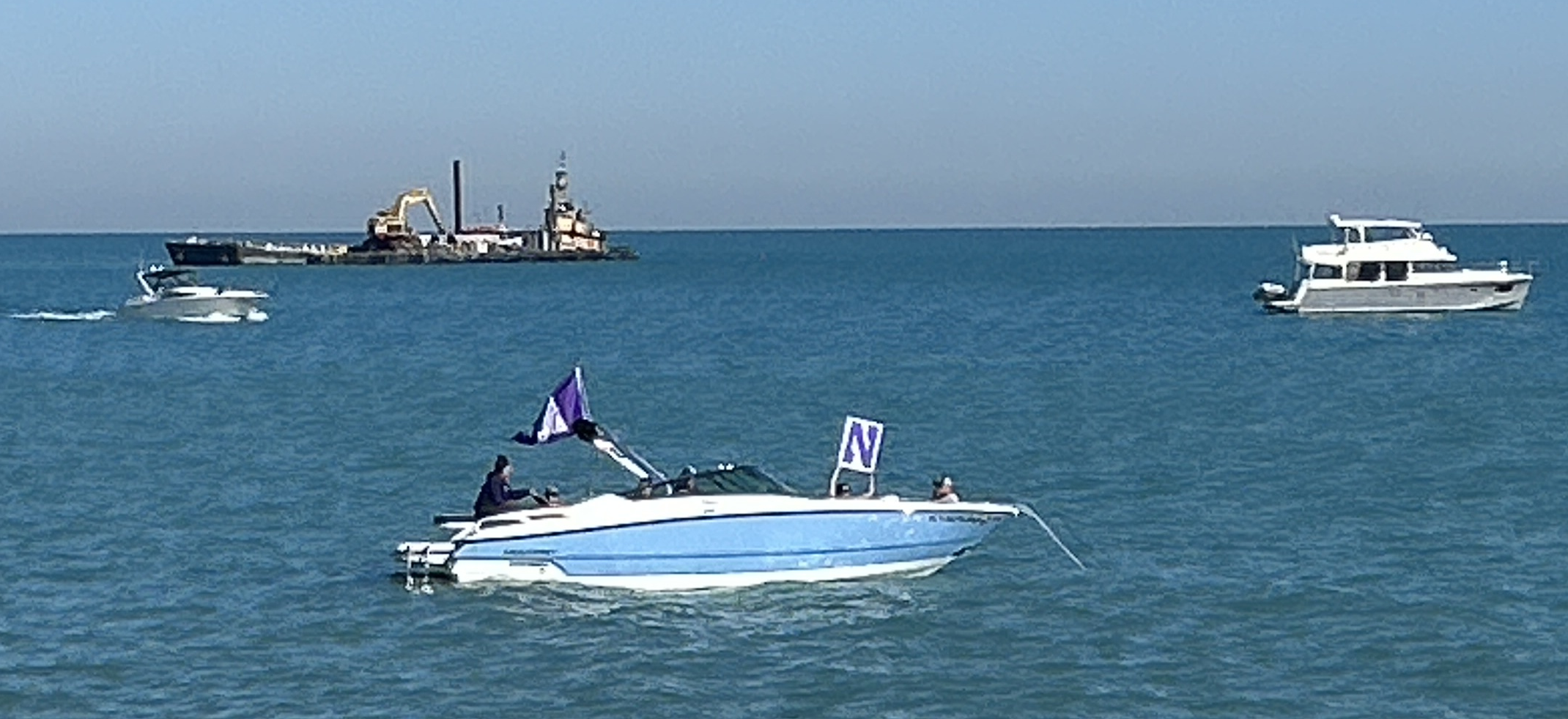
Floating tailgaters on the adjacent waters of Lake Michigan were a common sight during football games at the stadium

The stadium generated public interest due to the unique oddity of a school in one of the four power conferences playing at such a small-capacity venue. Its proximity to Lake Michigan also sparked intrigue because of the potential for lake winds to impact plays as well as the scenic setting with boats behind the eastern grandstand on the lake. Boats could be seen passing by during games or were anchored just beyond the stadium in what a Chicago Tribune columnist described as apparent "floating tailgate[s]" and others described with the portmanteau "sailgating". After the Wisconsin Badgers' October 19, 2024, victory over Northwestern at the stadium, the team's strength coach celebrated the victory by jumping from the venue into Lake Michigan.

While the athletic program opted not to use the balcony of the Kellogg Global Hub for ticketed spectators, during games students of the business school have been observed using the balcony to garner views of games.

Final Northwester football game at the venue, played against Colorado on September 19, 2026

The Wildcats played the first two home games of its 2026 season at Martin Stadium. Northwestern won both, defeating South Dakota State 34–18 on September 5 and Colorado 41–7 on September 19. New Ryan Field debuted on October 2, concluding the football team's stay at Martin.

=== Additional sports events held in the temporarily-expanded venue ===
In addition to the school's football team, its soccer teams and lacrosse program continued to play at the venue. An April 2025 Northwestern women's lacrosse game against the Michigan Wolverines set a Northwestern program home attendance record of 3,503. The game had been promoted as "Lacrosse Night in Chicago".

In 2025, it was announced that the stadium would be the location of the 2026 NCAA Division I Women's Lacrosse semi-finals and national championship. In July 2025, the Premier Lacrosse League played four neutral site games of its 2025 season at the venue. The four games took place over two consecutive days, with Evanston city officials anticipating that 3,500 spectators would likely attend each day. This was the first time the league had played games in the Chicago area since 2019. The event received strong attendance in apparent excess of advance estimates.

== Professional and semi-professional tenants ==
Beginning with their 2024 season, the Chicago Union team of the Ultimate Frisbee Association made the venue its home stadium, playing their first home game there in May 2024. In 2025, the Chicago Tempest of Women's Elite Rugby also made the venue its home stadium.

=== Chicago Stars FC ===
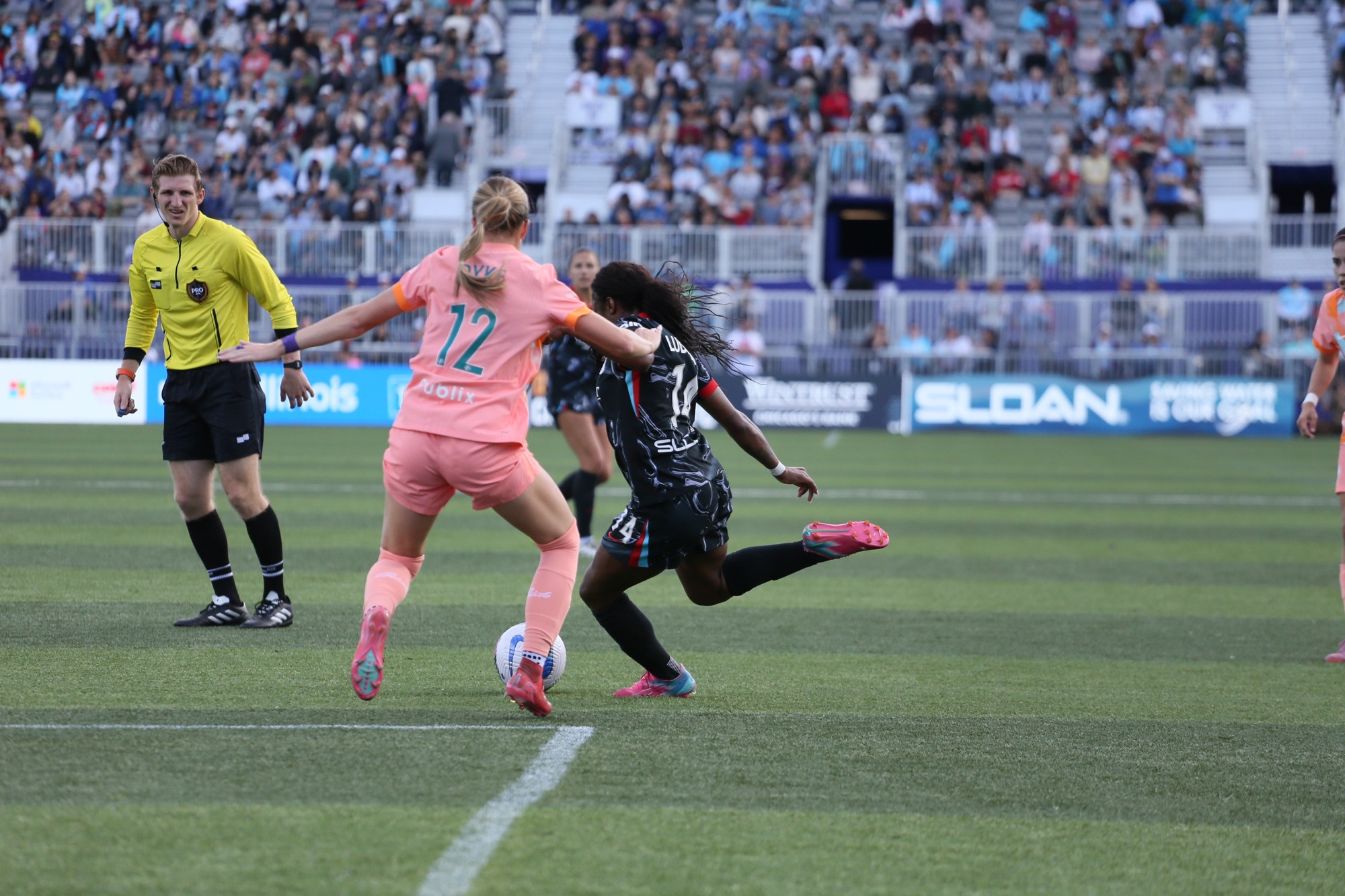
Chicago Stars playing at the venue on September 7, 2025

In 2012, the Chicago Red Stars (an NWSL professional women's soccer team, since renamed to Chicago Stars FC) played two home games at the venue.

Chicago Stars FC returned to the venue by playing a single home game of its 2025 season there. The club also filed in May 2024 to request a zoning analysis from the city of Evanston as to the possibility of the team making the venue its home stadium for sixteen games during its 2026 season. The team received zoning permission to play its 2026 season at the venue. In September 2025, it was announced the team would play all of its 2026 home games as a tenant of the venue. While the venue was initially anticipated to be downsized after the 2025 football season, Chicago Stars FC's announcement noted the venue's 12,000 capacity. The team also announced their intent to locate "Chicago Stars FC Fan Zone" along the nearby lakefront on game days.

Chicago Stars FC are not intent on making the stadium their permanent venue. By early 2026, the team began campaigning for local approvals to allow them to move to the new Ryan Field beginning with their 2027 season, which were quickly abandoned amid opposition organized by the same citizen groups that had previously organized in opposition to the Ryan Field's reconstruction. The team will, instead, remain at Martin Stadium during their 2027 season.
