= J. Landis Martin =

American lawyer (1945–2023)

- Born: November 5, 1945; Grand Island, Nebraska, U.S.
- Died: September 1, 2023 (aged 77)
- Education: Northwestern University
- Occupations: Lawyer, businessman, philanthropist
- Title: Former CEO, NL Industries
- Term: 1987-2003
- Spouse: Sharon Martin
- Children: 3

J. Landis Martin (November 5, 1945 – September 1, 2023), also known as Lanny Martin, was an American lawyer, businessman, and philanthropist. He was the chief executive officer of NL Industries from 1987 to 2003. He was the founder and managing director of Platte River Ventures, a private equity firm.

== Early life ==
J. Landis Martin was born on November 5, 1945, in Grand Island, Nebraska. He graduated from Northwestern University, where he earned a bachelor's degree in 1968, followed by a Juris Doctor in 1973.

== Career ==
Martin began his career as a lawyer for Kirkland & Ellis from 1973 to 1987. He was the chief executive officer of NL Industries, a public company listed on the New York Stock Exchange, from 1987 to 2003. In 2005, he founded Platte River Ventures, a private equity firm based in Cherry Creek, Denver. Martin served as its managing director. He was also the founding chairman of Crown Castle International Corp.

Martin was inducted into the Colorado Business Hall of Fame in 2012.

== Philanthropy ==
Martin was a patron of the arts. With his wife, he donated $25 million to the Denver Art Museum in 2006 and "more than $3 million" to the Clyfford Still Museum in 2011. He was chairman emeritus of the Central City Opera House Association and the Houston Grand Opera.

Martin maintained close ties to his alma mater, Northwestern University. In 2013, he donated $15 million to the university for the construction of a new athletics complex, in recognition of which Northwestern named its soccer and lacrosse field "Lanny and Sharon Martin Stadium". Additionally, he served as the chairman of the board of trustees of the university from September 2017 until August 2022. The complex will also include starting in 2024 the school's temporary 15,000-seat stadium for the football program as Ryan Field is rebuilt.

== Personal life ==
Martin had a wife, Sharon, and three children. Martin died peacefully on September 1, 2023.
