= 2016 Big Ten women's lacrosse tournament =

American college lacrosse tournament

The 2016 Big Ten Women's Lacrosse Tournament was held May 5 to May 8 at Lanny and Sharon Martin Stadium in Evanston, Illinois. The winner of the tournament received the Big Ten Conference's automatic bid to the 2016 NCAA Division I Women's Lacrosse Championship. All six conference teams competed in the event. The tournament format is single elimination. The seeds were based upon the teams' regular season conference record. Maryland won their first conference tournament championship after winning the first two regular season crowns (2015, 2016) in conference history.

== Standings ==
Seed	School	Conference	Overall
1	Maryland ‡	5–0	22–1
2	Penn State	3–2	14–7
3	Northwestern	3–2	11–10
4	Rutgers	2–3	6–12
5	Ohio State	2–3	11–6
6	Michigan	0–5	6–12
‡ Big Ten regular season champions

== Schedule ==
Session	Game	Time*	Matchup	Score	Television
Quarterfinals – Thursday, May 5
1	1	11:00 am	#4 Rutgers vs. #5 Ohio State	11–10 2OT	Big Ten Network
1	2	1:30 pm	#3 Northwestern vs. #6 Michigan	20–5	Big Ten Network
Semifinals – Friday, May 6
1	1	5:30 pm	#1 Maryland vs. #4 Rutgers	19–9	Big Ten Network
1	2	8:00 pm	#2 Penn State vs. #3 Northwestern	9–6	Big Ten Network
Championship – Sunday, May 8
2	3	12:00pm	#1 Maryland vs. #3 Northwestern	12–9	Big Ten Network
*Game times in CST. # – Denote tournament seeding.

== Bracket ==
Lanny and Sharon Martin Stadium – Evanston, Illinois

Quarterfinals; May 5
4	Rutgers	11**
5	Ohio State	10
3	Northwestern	20
6	Michigan	5

Semifinals Game; May 6
1	Maryland	19
4	Rutgers	9
2	Penn State	6
3	Northwestern	9

Championship; May 8
1	Maryland	12
3	Northwestern	9

* – Denotes overtime period
