= Lakefront Athletics and Recreation Complex =

Sports and recreation complex, Northwestern University

Coordinates: 42.0594°N 87.6728°W

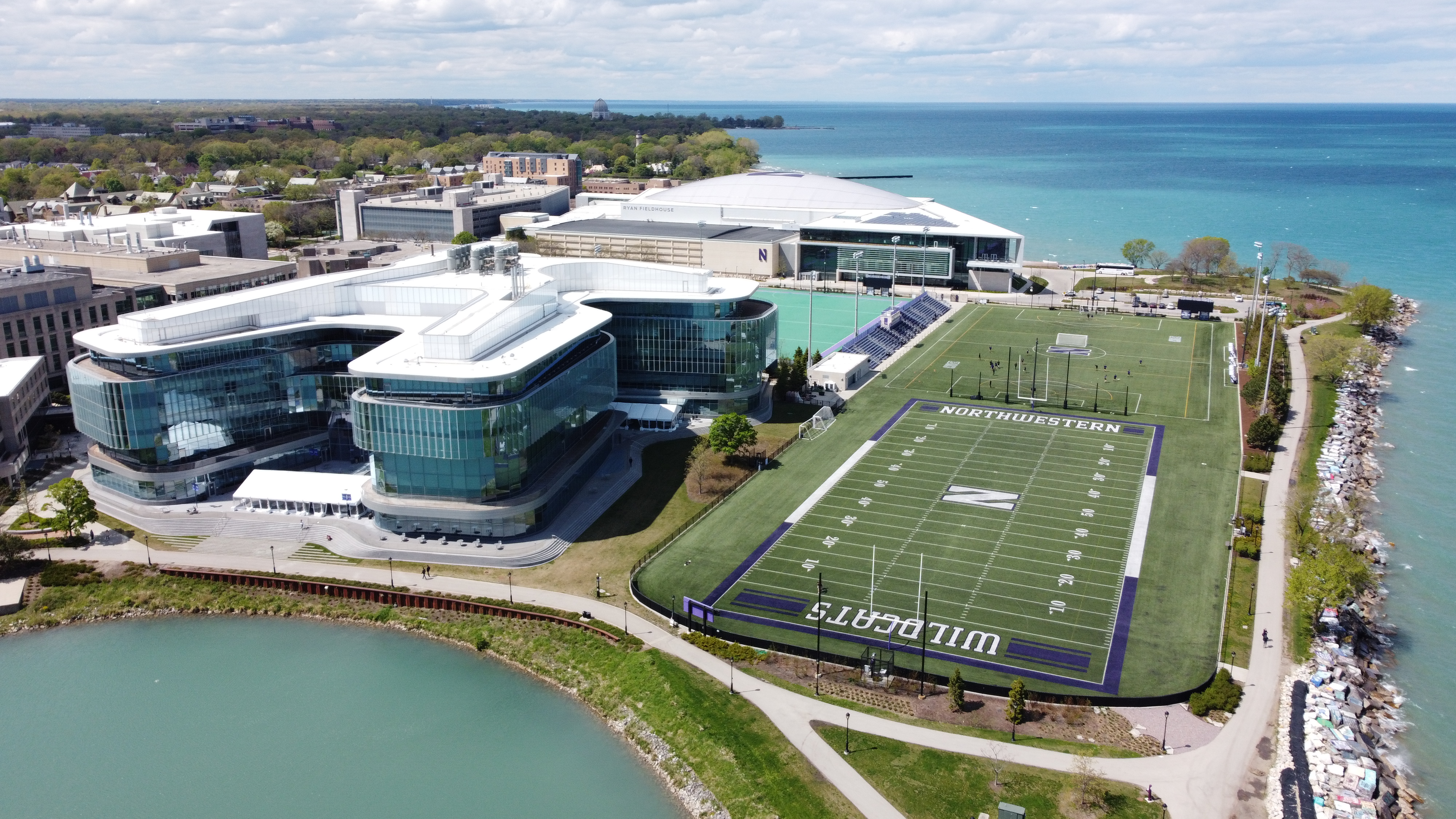
2021 photograph of the athletic complex and the adjacent Kellogg Global Hub.

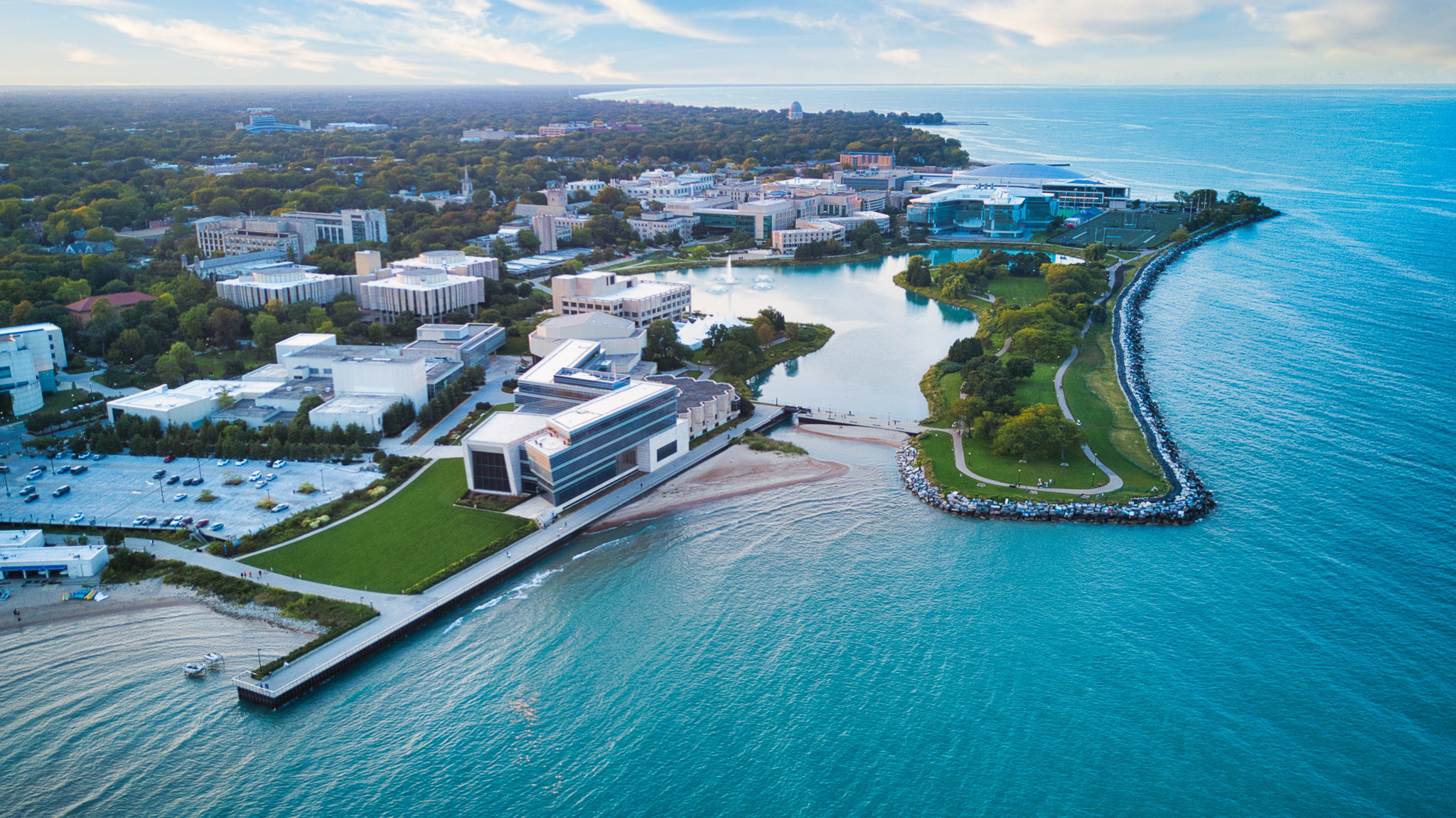
Zoomed-out aerial view of the Evanston campus' lakefront, with the facilities visible towards the upper right

Lakefront Athletics and Recreation Complex is a sports and recreation complex on the main campus of Northwestern University in Evanston, Illinois. It contains both facilities for general student body fitness and recreation, as well as facilities dedicated to Northwestern Wildcats sports programs (the university's teams in the Big Ten Conference of NCAA Division I). Wildcats facilities include competition and practice venues, training and team meeting facilities, offices, locker rooms, dining facilities, and an academic support services center.

The complex traces its history to the opening of the Henry Crown Sports Pavilion in 1987 and the opening of an adjacent sports field complex in 1997. In the 2010s, the existing facilities were renovated and new facilities added to the complex, which was collectively dubbed the "Lakefront Athletics and Recreation Complex". The project elevated the complex into a main hub for all student athletics program.

== Location ==
The complex is located at the north end of Northwestern University's main Evanston Campus, abutting the shore of Lake Michigan.

== History ==
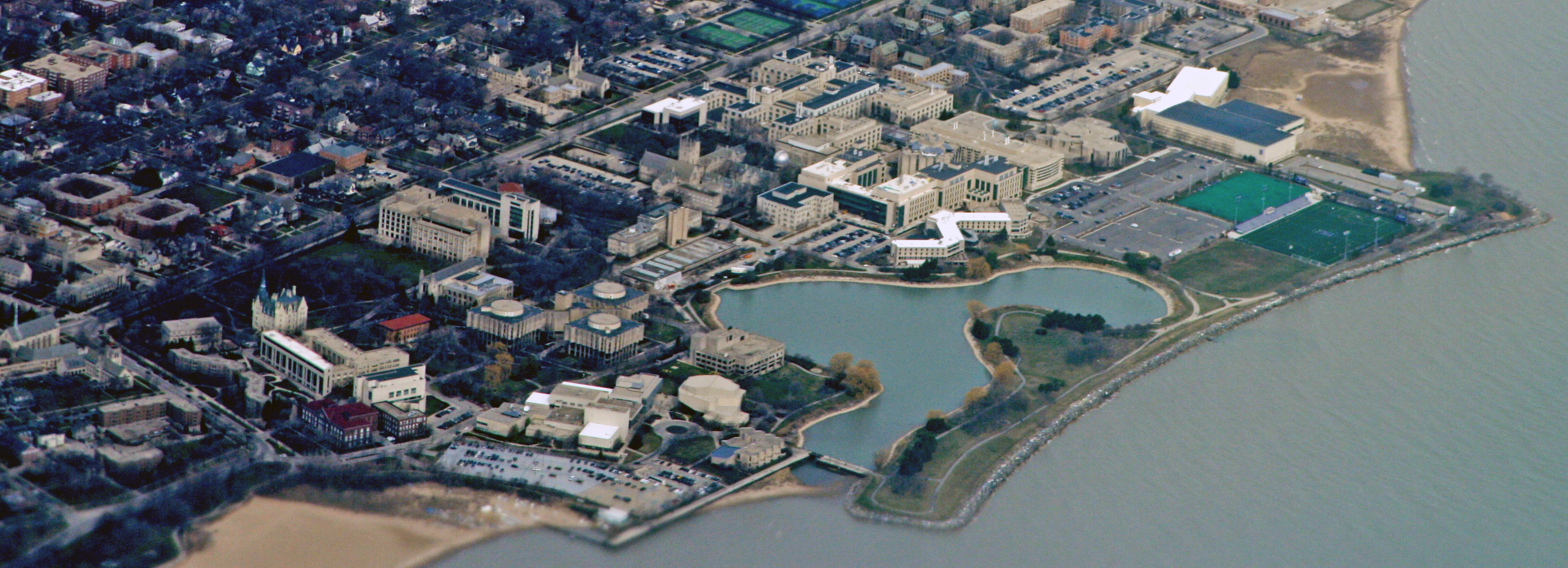
2009 aerial view of the outdoor fields, the Henry Crown Sports Pavilion, and nearby campus features

=== Original construction ===
In 1987, Northwestern University opened the Henry Crown Sports Pavilion, which contained sports facilities including the Norris Aquatics Center.

In 1997, fields were constructed on the lakefront near the sports pavilion as part of what was originally known as the "Leonard B. Thomas Sports Complex". The multi-field complex was built at a cost $3.5 million to provide home fields for the university's soccer, lacrosse, and field hockey programs on the university's main campus. In 2000, the university began construction on the $10 million Combe Tennis Center, an expansion of the Henry Crown Sports Pavilion that added a six-court indoor tennis facility.

=== Mid-2010s renovations and expansions ===
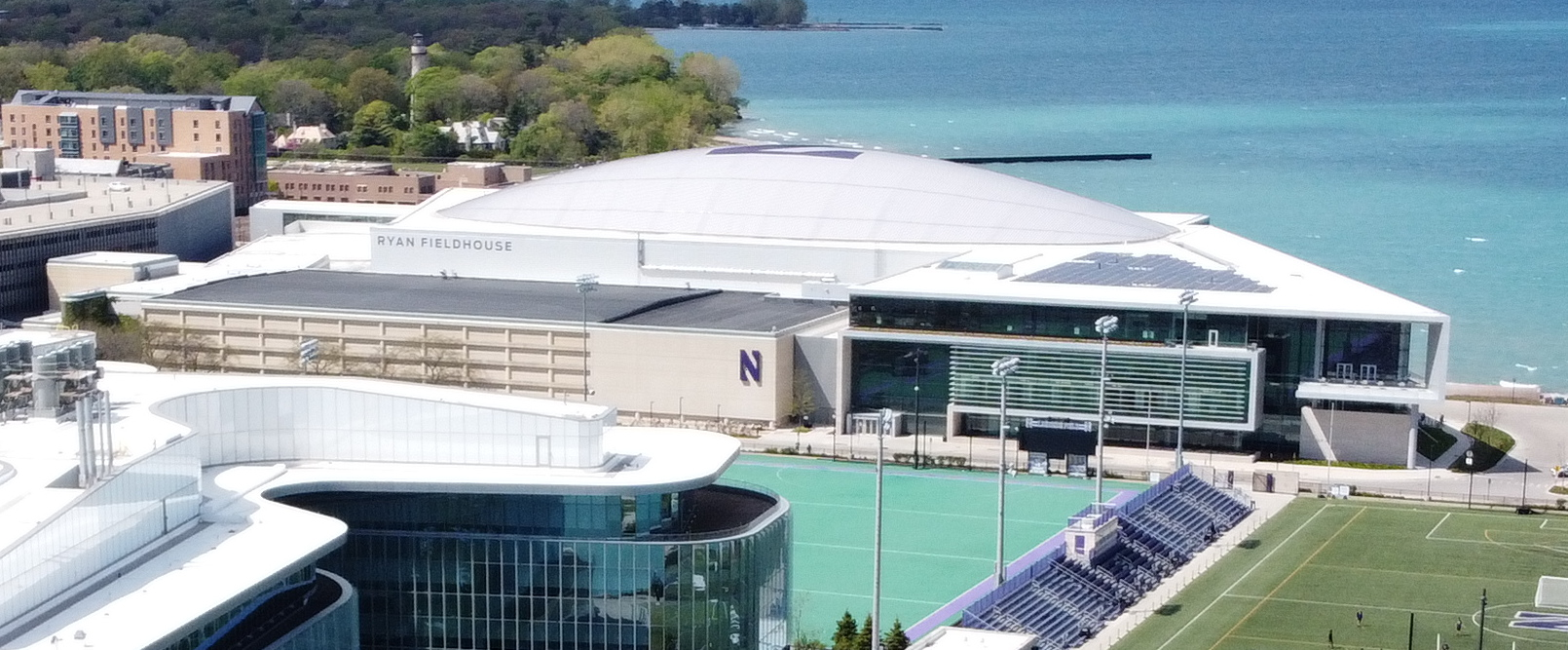
2021 (north-facing) photograph of the Walter Athletics Center, Ryan Fieldhouse, and Henry Crown Fieldhouse; all of which are visible behind the Kellogg Global Hub, Lakeside Field, and Martin Stadium.

In 2010, the university announced a materplan to redevelop the complex with the addition of a new practice facility. A study by the architectural firm Populous was presented to university trustees the following year. The initial plans were to build a new multipurpose practice facility that would host both indoor sports practices, and contain 2,500 seats that would allow it to hold events. The plan also included a new 1,200 car parking structure, to be built atop existing surface parking lots to the west of the sports pavilion. Plans also included the construction of a new outdoor practice field, a new diving well in the Norris Aquatics Center, and the addition of new locker rooms, weight rooms, fitness facilities, and sports medicine facilities. The planned expansion was estimated to cost $220 million. The proposal faced some criticism both over its high cost and its use of a scenic piece of the campus' lakeshore for the purposes of serving the university's athletics programs rather than its academics program. Despite such critiques, the plan was approved. In November 2012, university trustees voted to advance the plans to expand the lakefront sports facilities. Due to its lakefront location, the project needed a permit from the U.S. Army Corps of Engineers, as well as permissions from the U.S. Fish and Wildlife Service, the Illinois Environmental Protection Agency, and the Illinois Department of Natural Resources.

The parking garage component of the project faced some resistance and delay in approval from the Evanston Preservation Commission.

Groundbreaking for the project took place in November 2015. Using funding gifted during its "We Will. The Campaign for Northwestern" fundraising campaign for campus facilities upgrades, the university renovated and expanded its existing lakefront facilities, and constructed new facilities to transform the corner of campus into the newly dubbed "Lakefront Athletics and Recreation Complex". The project included the construction of the Ryan Fieldhouse (which houses Wilson Field, an indoor training field), and the Walter Athletics Center (which houses support services for student athletes and offices for various sports programs). The project finished with the August 2018 opening of the Ryan Field House and the Walter Athletics Center.

== Henry Crown Sports Pavilion ==
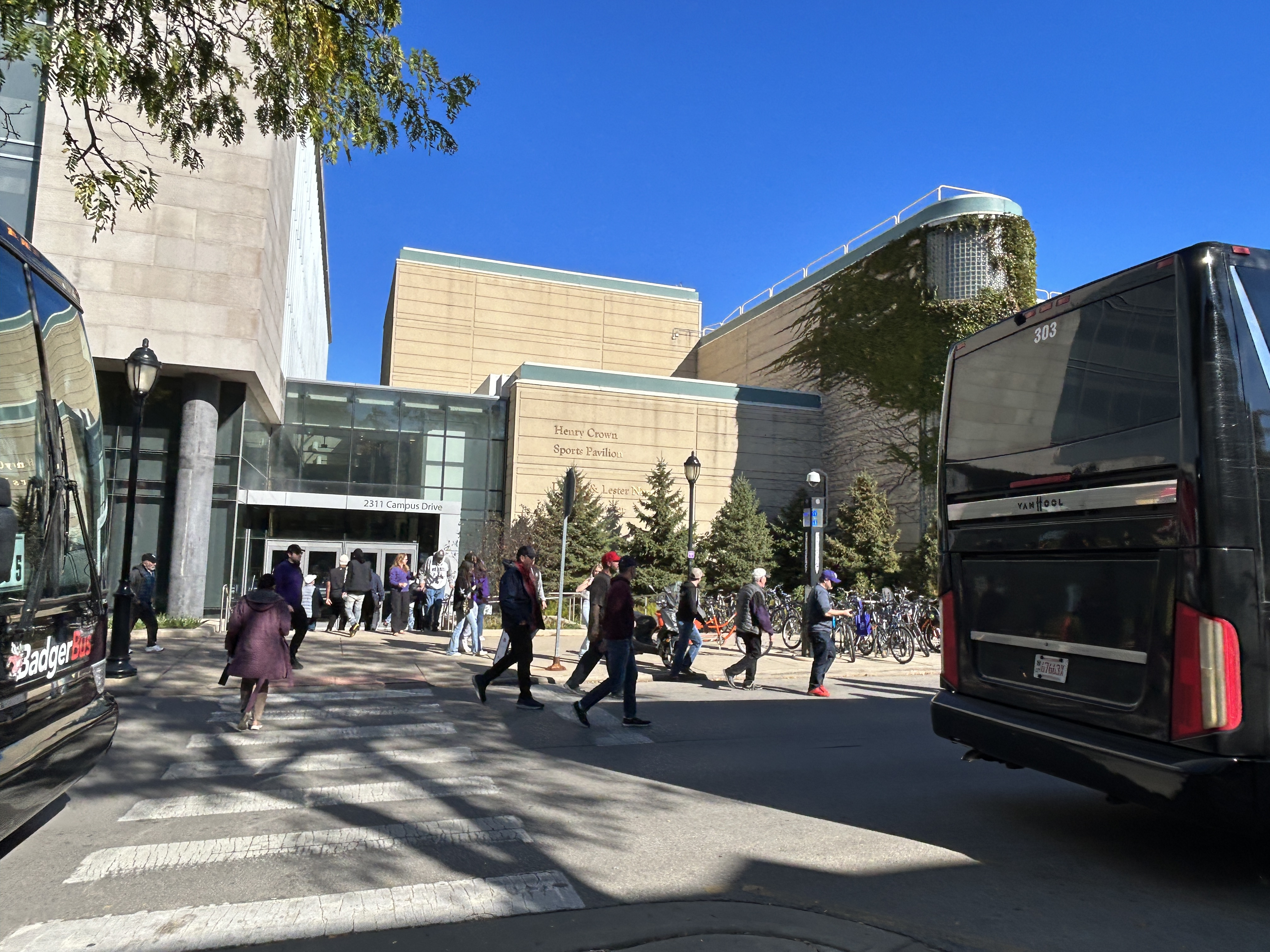
Entrance to the Henry Crown Sports Pavilion (photographed in 2024, facing north)

The first portion of the complex to be constructed was the Henry Crown Sports Pavilion, which opened in 1988. It is alternatively known as the Henry Crown Sports Pavilion and Aquatics Center, or the "SPAC". The facility is a multi-building athletics and recreation which features a fitness center, weight room, basketball and racquetball courts an aquatics center, and other sports facilities. In 2002, an indoor tennis facility was added in a newly constructed fourth building. The pavilion is located along Campus Drive, and is the main sports recreation center on campus. It is 95,000 square feet (8,800 m^{2}), and includes the Norris Aquatics Center and the Combe Tennis Center. It is also structurally connected to Ryan Fieldhouse, the Walter Athletics Center, and the North Parking Garage.

=== Student recreation and fitness facilities ===
The pavilion facility includes facilities for basketball, swimming, squash, racquetball, tennis, group exercise, cycling, weight lifting, and general cardio along with exercise-related activities and programs. It was renovated in 2014 to include an additional 30,000 square feet (2,800 m^{2}), new studio space, and new exercise equipment. In 2018, new cardio machines were added to the facility. Additionally, the university opened three new recreational basketball courts and a new three-lane jogging track. These replaced the venue's previous recreational basketball courts and indoor running track, which had been located in a building which was demolished in order to make way for construction of the Ryan Fieldhouse.

=== Norris Aquatics Center ===
The Dellora A. and Lester J. Norris Aquatics Center is a natatorium located inside of the Henry Crown Sports Pavilion. Its street address is 2311 Campus Drive. It is the home venue of Northwestern University Wildcats Swimming and Diving. It is the location of all their home meets. The center, named for Dellora A. and Lester J. Norris, includes a 750,000-gallon, a 750,000 U.S. gallons (2,800,000 L) 50-meter-by-25-yard pool (Olympic size swimming pool) with movable walls that run on a track system, allow for the pool to be custom-fitted. The facility also includes a heat recycling system, and an electronic scoreboard. It seats 800 spectators. The depth of the swimming pool ranges from 4 feet (1.2 m) to 15 feet (4.6 m). The facility also has a diving towers with both diving boards and diving platforms. The facility also contains saunas, locker rooms, and family changing rooms (the latter to accommodate public use). The facility has windows offering scenic views of Lake Michigan. Additionally, the facility has an outdoor patio and sundeck overlooking the lake and an adjacent beach.

The pool opened with the Henry Crown Pavilion in 1987. It was renovated in 2012, with its pool deck and bleachers refurbished, an ultraviolet-based disinfectant system being added, and the facility's electrical work being updated. The building was constructed with cast-in-place concrete foundations. Its structure used steel columns that were covered by precast concrete panels, and exterior walls built of precast insulated concrete panels. The pool is located at ground-level, with the slab of the pool deck having been built of cast-in-place concrete, which was then covered by mortar-laid ceramic tiles. The pool originally featured three underwater windows, though these were removed during the 2012 renovations. During the late-2010s renovations of the lakeside complex's facilities, the natatorium was expanded. Additions included the construction of a new dryland training space, new locker rooms, new coaching offices, and a new multi-use meeting space.

In addition to being used by the university swimming and diving program, it is also used for recreational purposes by students and the greater public.

The facility was used for diving competitions during the 2006 Gay Games. It has previously hosted the United States Swimming Elite National training camp. It also was the site of the 1999 Swim Meet of Champions event, pitting the United States national swimming team against a team of Big Ten swimming all-stars.

=== Combe Tennis Center ===
The Combe Tennis Center, an indoor tennis facility was completed in 2002, adding a fourth building to the Henry Crown Sports Pavilion and Aquatics Center The facility is the home venue of indoor matches of Northwestern Tennis. It features six courts with electronic scoreboards and a main team scoreboard. The facility also includes spectator seating on a balcony overlooking the courts with unobstructed views of each match. In 2020, the athletics and recreation facility underwent renovations to its ceiling and lighting. The facility is named for former Northwestern tennis player Ivan Combe, who played for the university from 1931 to 1933. The Intercollegiate Tennis Association named the Combe Tennis Center the "2002 Outstanding Facility".

=== North Campus Parking Garage ===
As part of its mid-2010s renovations, a 1,125-capacity parking garage was constructed in the complex, just to the west of the Henry Crown Sports Oavilion. The structure housing the garage also included new recreational programming space for the SPAC, including classrooms, a 7,000 square foot (650 m^{2}) weight room, fitness studios, and offices.

Northwestern touted the parking structure as fitting into its vision to push on-campus parking towards the edges of the campus in order to pedestrianize the inner-reaches of the campus. Besides its east exterior, most of the garage's exterior is glass-enclosed. Currently, more than 500 spaces in the garage are reserved for permit-holders.

=== The Garage business incubator ===
An approximately 12,000 square foot (1,100 m^{2}) portion of the parking structure was converted into a space to house an innovation and business startup incubator dubbed "The Garage". The incubator space was designed by the architecture space Gensler, and opened in June 2015.

== Outdoor athletic fields ==
In 1997, at a cost $3.5 million, the university constructed a multi-field sports complex that was then initially as the "Leonard B. Thomas Sports Complex". The complex was alternatively known as the "Leonard B. Thomas Athletic Complex", or the "LBT". Built adjacent to the existing Henry Crown Sports Pavilion, these fields were constructed to provide home venues on the campus for the university's lacrosse and field hockey programs. Soccer and lacrosse shared a grass turf in the complex, while field hockey was given a separate dedicated artificial turf field.

The site of the fields boasts views of Lake Michigan and distant views of the Chicago skyline. The complex was renovated in 2016 in a project that also added an outdoor football practice facility. Prior to this renovation, the soccer and lacrosse field had been referred to as "Lakeside Field", the same name also used for the adjacent field hockey venue. While the field hockey venue has continued to use that name, after the renovation the soccer and lacrosse field has been known as "Martin Stadium".

=== Martin Stadium ===
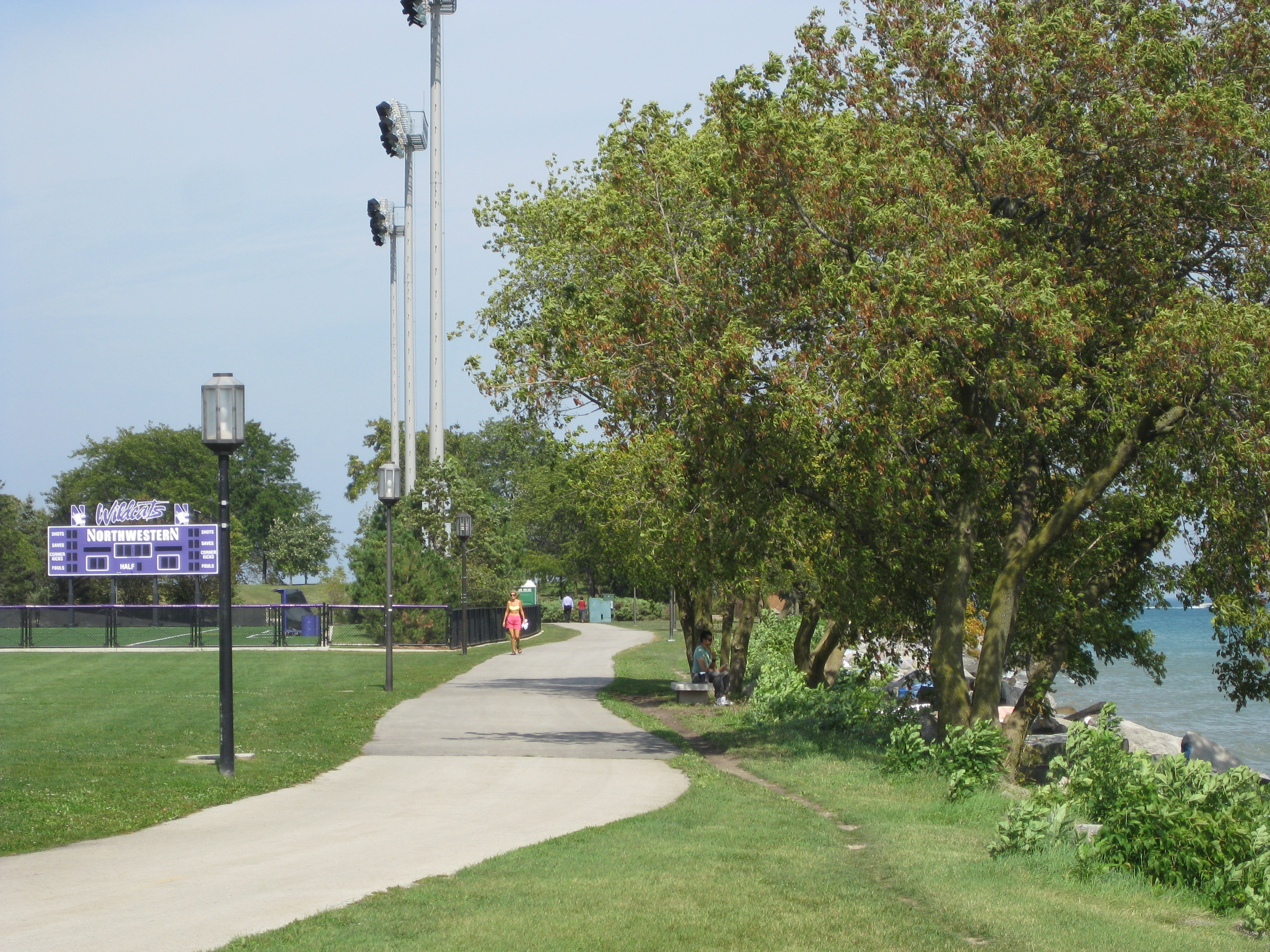
Soccer venue prior to its 2016 renovation (photographed in 2010, facing north)

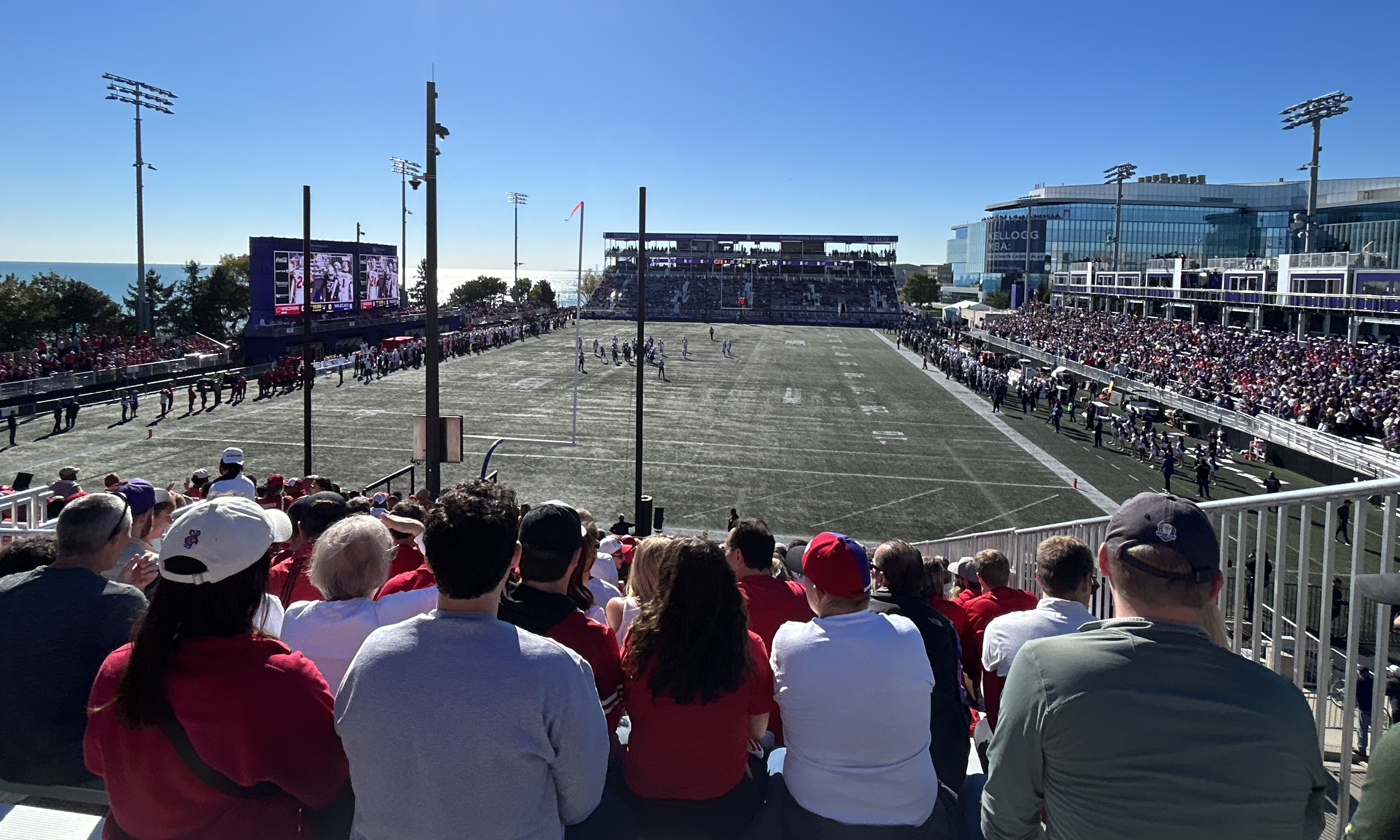
October 2024 game between the Wisconsin Badgers and the Wildcats at the temporarily-expanded stadium at (photographed facing south from the temporary northern grandstand)

Lanny and Sharon Martin Stadium is an outdoor sport and recreation facility, home of Northwestern soccer and lacrosse games. Martin Stadium underwent renovations and reopened on March 8, 2016.

The venue pregioisly had a capacity of 2,000 spectators.

On April 10, 2024, the university announced that a temporary facility would be constructed as part of the complex to serve as the football team's home stadium for the 2024 and 2025 seasons while a replacement for Ryan Field is built.

In 2025, the stadium was announced as the host of the 2026 NCAA Division I women's lacrosse semi-finals and national championship. The facility is planned to be the home venue of the Chicago Stars FC professional women's soccer team of the NWSL during its 2026 season.

=== Lakeside Field ===
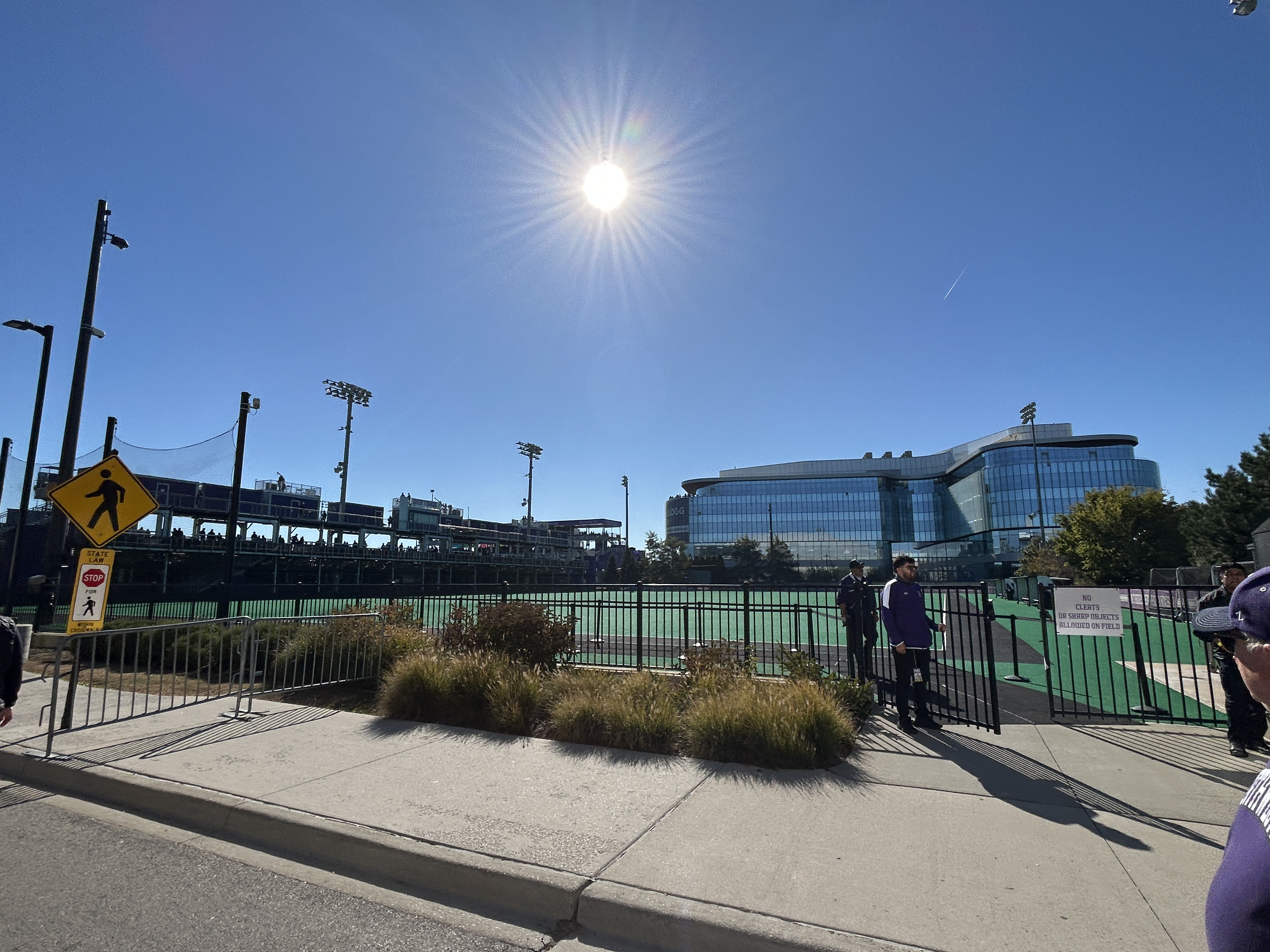
2024 (south-facing) photograph of Lakeside Field

Lakeside Field is a dedicated field hockey venue which opened in 1997 with capacity for 300 seated spectators. It serves as the home venue of the university's field hockey team. The venue's artificial turf is designed to the particular specifications of field hockey. It sits to the west of Martin Stadium and to the north of the Kellogg Global Hub academic building.

The facility underwent renovations in 2004. It again underwent renovations in 2015, during which its playing surface was replaced. After the 2015 renovation, the facility has a permanent seating capacity of between approximately 300 and 500.

The venue was the location of the Big Ten Field Hockey Tournament in 2002, 2004, and 2018.

=== Hutcheson Field ===
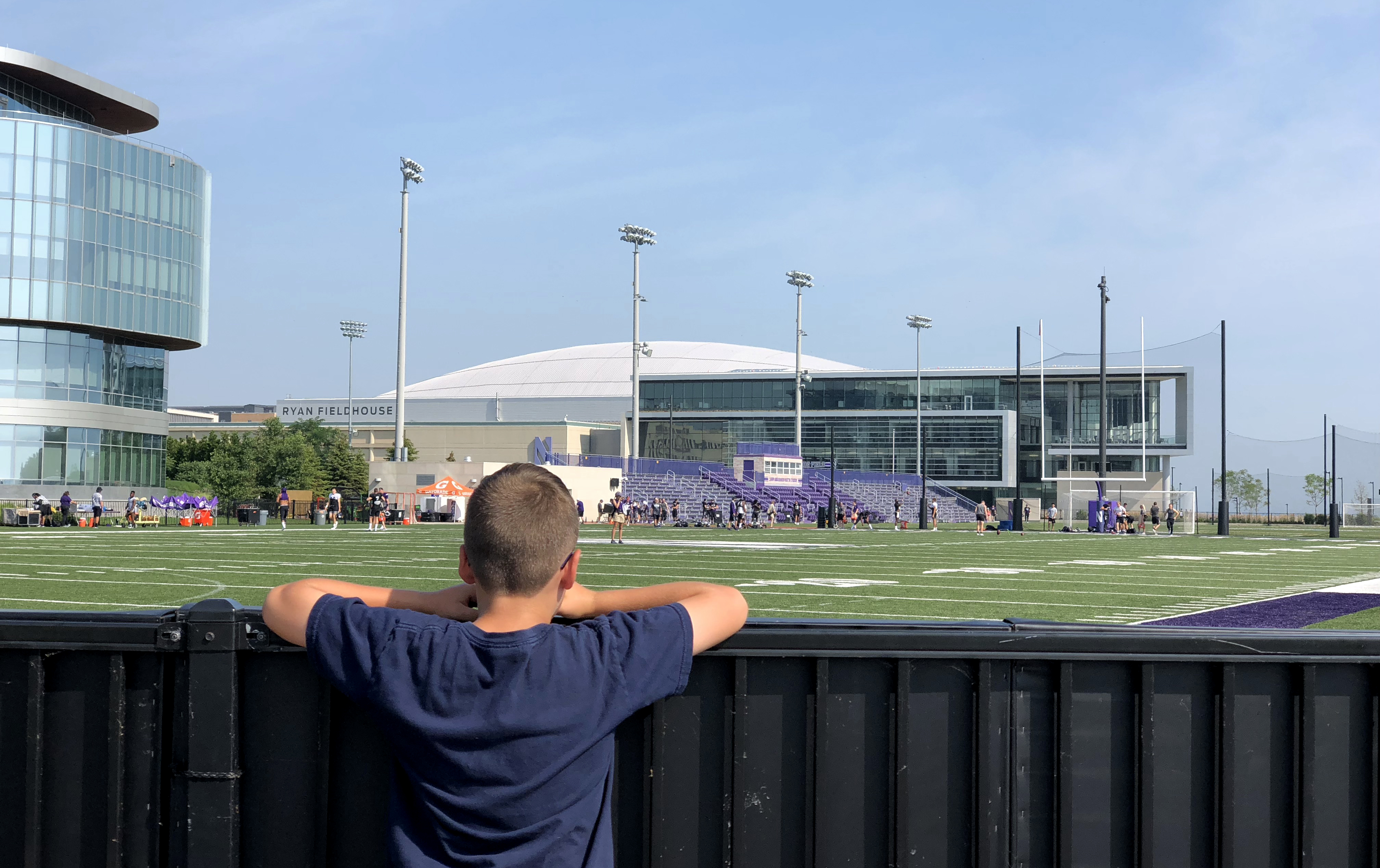
An onlooker watches an August 2018 practice at Hutcheson Field (captured facing north, with the Kellogg Global Hub visible at left; and with Martin Stadium's permanent west grandstand, the Ryan Fieldhouse, and the Walter Athletics Center all visible in the background)

Chap and Ethel Hutcheson Field is a (currently disused) American football field that was built during the 2016 renovations of the outdoor athletic fields. The venue was built for primary use as an athletics and recreation practice field, including a primary use as an outdoor practice venue for the football program. It is located to the south of Martin Stadium and the east of the Kellogg Global hub, and features a turf surface that was striped to the specifications of NCAA football regulations. It is currently disused, with the south grandstand and concessions for the temporarily enlarged Martin Field being located atop it.

== Ryan Fieldhouse and Wilson Field ==
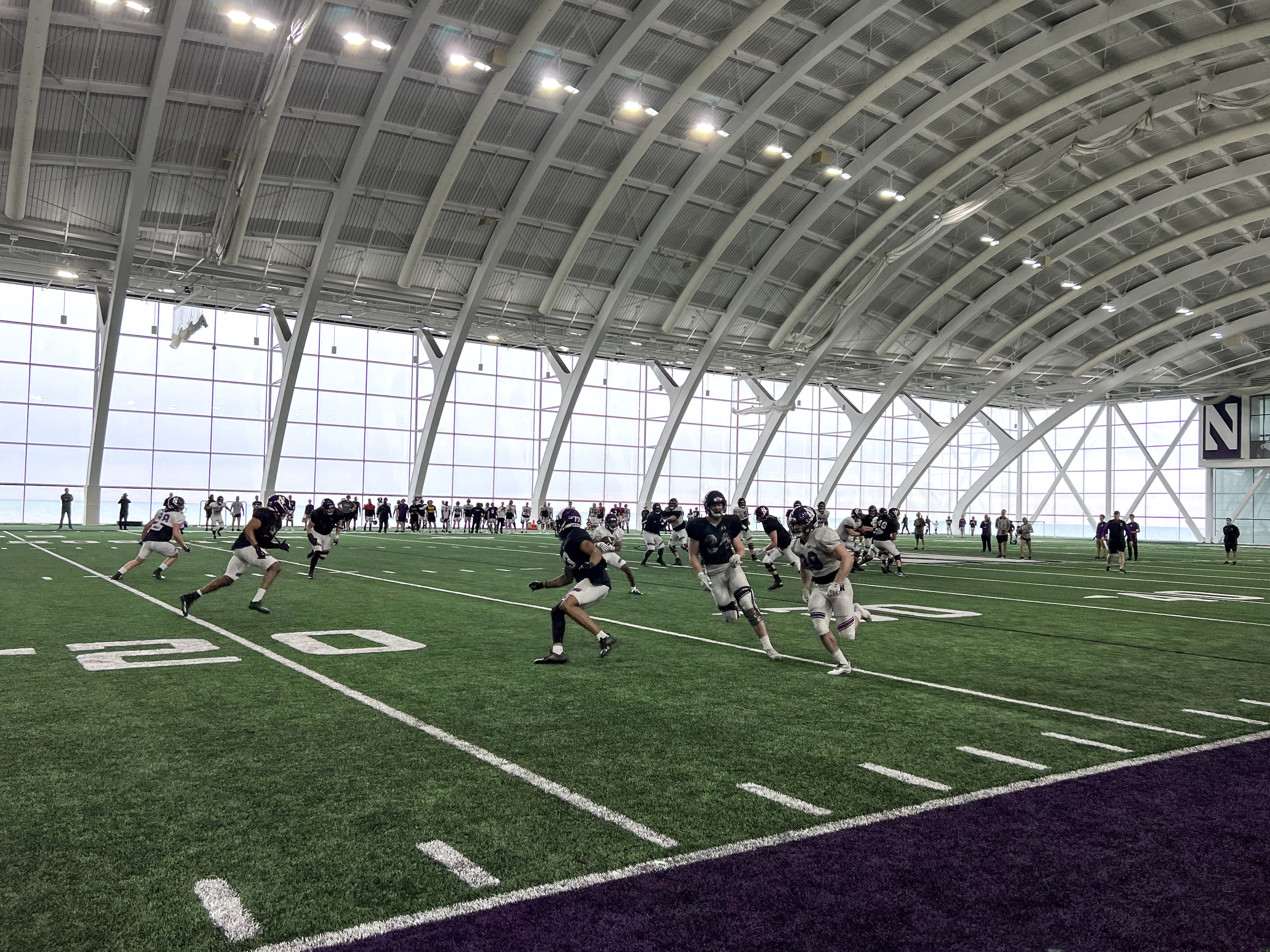
April 2022 photograph of a practice at Wilson Field, inside of the Ryan Fieldhouse (photographed facing northeast)

One of the two largest additions to the complex during its 2010s renovations is the Ryan Fieldhouse (named for university trustee Patrick G. Ryan and his wife, Shirley) in recognition of their financial contributions to the university's fundraising efforts), an indoor sports facility which opened in April 2018. The main feature of the venue is a full-size indoor playing surface, which is named "Wilson Field" in honor of a $15 million gift by alumni Stephen R. and Susan K. Wilson that went towards building the facility. This field is utilized by sports teams to practice and compete indoors, avoiding inclement weather. Northwestern Lacrosse plays a portion of its home schedule inside on Wilson Field.

Construction of the Ryan Fieldhouse and the Walter Athletics Center allowed the university's football team to consolidate its non-gameday operations to the university's main Evanston campus. Previously, the team had located much of these operations at the Ryan Field athletic campus (at Central Street and Ashland in Evanston), one mile west of the main campus.

In order to accommodate events, Wilson Field contains movable bleacher seating that can accommodate between 900 and 2,500 spectators. It also has capacity for additional seating to be temporarily added for larger events, such as convocations. It is designed to have a maximum capacity of 6,000 for assembly-style events. Wilson Field contains an automated netting system designed subdivide its space in order to allow for simultaneous use by multiple groups. Its playing surface is striped for the NCAA's football, soccer, and lacrosse regulations.

The main entrance to the facility is located at 2333 Campus Drive, containing stairs and elevators up to the facility's main atrium. The atrium is named the "Mitchell and Valerie Slotnick Atrium" in recognition of a $5 million gift from alumnus Mitchell Slotnick and his wife.

Adjacent to the Wilson Field, the facility contains sports performance spaces for both football and for Olympic sports. The facility also includes a strength and conditioning center for sports teams. The football team's athlete amenities include plunge pools and hot tubs. Other features of the facility include dedicated locker rooms for various varsity sports teams and various sports medicine facilities.

The facility was built on land the previously housed one of the buildings of the Crown Sports Pavilion and an adjacent surface parking lot. It features a 44-foot-tall glass façade on its eastern and northern exterior exposures, providing panoramic views of the Lake Michigan shoreline. The combined cost of the construction for the Ryan Fieldhouse and adjoining Walter Athletics Center was $270 million. Both the Ryan Fieldhouse and Walter Athletics Center were opened in 2018.

== Walter Athletics Center ==
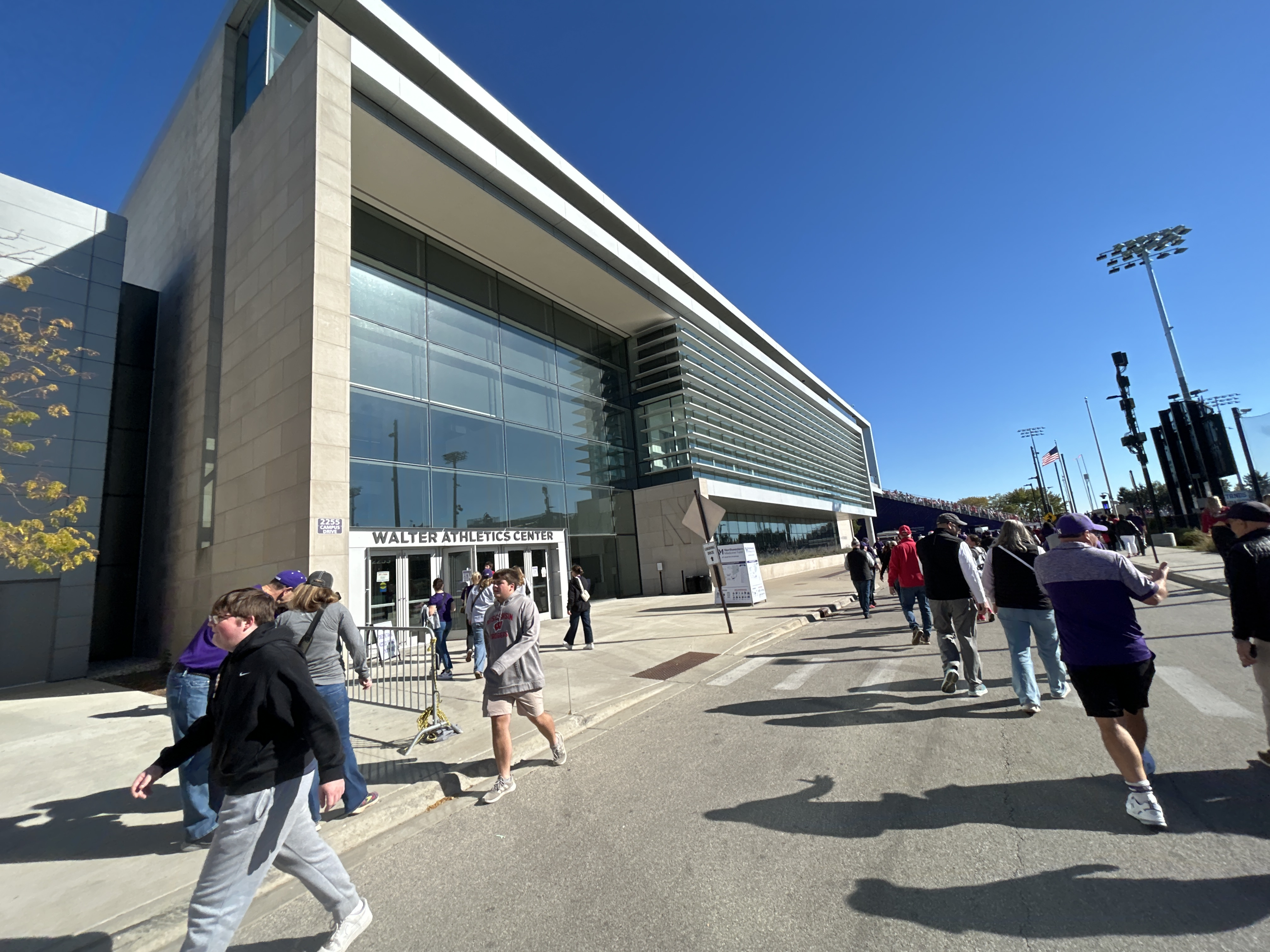
Exterior of the Walter Athletics Center (photographed in 2024, facing northeast)

The Walter Athletics Center is the last new athletics and recreation facility to be built on the lakefront as part of the "We Will" campaign. The facility is a four-story, state-of-the-art development center located on the north end of the Evanston campus, structurally connected to Ryan Fieldhouse, the Henry Crown Sports Pavilion, and the North Parking Garage. The facility is named in honor of university trustee Mark R. Walter and Kimbra D. Walter, alumni who made a $40 million gift that went towards funding facility construction. Additionally, one portion area of the facility is named the "Kimberly K. Querrey and Louis A. Simpson Wing" in recognition of a $23 "leadership gift" from university trustees Kimberly K. Querrey and Louis A Simpson, which went towards the funding facility construction.

The facility houses services for the university's student athletes, including an academic support center, nutrition and dining center, and sports performance center. It also contains coaching staff offices for several varsity teams, as well as sports program administrative offices. Among the teams that have their offices in the facility is Northwestern football. The building is touted as a "headquarters" of sorts for the program, also featuring dedicated locker rooms and meeting rooms for the football team.

The multi-purpose facility includes spaces for academic and professional development, nutrition and dining, sports performance, sports medicine and athletic training, and locker rooms for more than 500 Northwestern student-athletes. The Walter Athletics Center's design allows for plenty of natural light and has unobstructed views of Lake Michigan, the Chicago skyline, and other Northwestern facilities including Martin Stadium and Lakeside Field.
