= 2019 Army Black Knights football team =

United States Military Academy in the 2019 NCAA Division I FBS football season

2019 Army Black Knights football
- Conference: Independent
- Record: 5–8
- Head coach: Jeff Monken (6th season)
- Offensive coordinator: Brent Davis (6th season)
- Offensive scheme: Triple option
- Defensive coordinator: John Loose (1st season)
- Base defense: 3–4
- Captains: Cole Christiansen; Kelvin Hopkins Jr.; Elijah Riley
- Home stadium: Michie Stadium

2019 NCAA Division I FBS independents football records
| | Conf. | | | Overall |
| Team | W | | L | W | | L |
|---|---|---|---|---|---|---|
| No. 12 Notre Dame | | – | | 11 | – | 2 |
| Liberty | | – | | 8 | – | 5 |
| BYU | | – | | 7 | – | 6 |
| Army | | – | | 5 | – | 8 |
| New Mexico State | | – | | 2 | – | 10 |
| UMass | | – | | 1 | – | 11 |
Rankings from AP Poll

The 2019 Army Black Knights football team represented the United States Military Academy as an independent in the 2019 NCAA Division I FBS football season. The Black Knights were led by sixth-year head coach Jeff Monken and played their home games at Michie Stadium. Due to playing an away game at Hawaii and the NCAA's "Hawaii Exemption", the Black Knights played a 13-game regular season in 2019. They finished the season with a record of 5–8, finishing in third place for the Commander-in-Chief's Trophy following losses to Air Force and Navy, and missing out on a bowl game for the first time since the 2015 season.

== Preseason ==
=== Offseason ===
Defensive coordinator Jay Bateman announced in December 2018 that he would be leaving to become the co-defensive coordinator and safeties coach at North Carolina under newly hired coach Mack Brown. Weeks later, head football strength and conditioning coach Brian Hess was announced as joining Bateman at North Carolina. Assistant football strength and conditioning coach Maurice Sims would also leave for North Carolina within the month. Safeties coach John Loose, after serving as the interim defensive coordinator for the 2018 Lockheed Martin Armed Forces Bowl victory over Houston, was announced as the full-time replacement at defensive coordinator on January 10, 2019.

On January 14, 2019, Army West Point announced a new multi-year contract extension for head coach Jeff Monken through the 2024 season. On the same day Army beat writer for the Times Herald-Record, Sal Interdonato, broke the news that Kansas Wesleyan head coach Matt Drinkall had joined the Army football staff as an offensive analyst. On January 18, Interdonato revealed that defensive line coach Chad Wilt had taken the same position with the Cincinnati Bearcats.

On January 31, the West Point athletics department announced that Matt Hachmann would be joining the football staff as the outside linebackers coach. He had spent the past two years as the linebackers coach at Stony Brook, and before that eight years as defensive coordinator at Towson. Because of his posting as linebackers coach, several defensive assistant coaches changed positions of responsibility. Coach Daryl Dixon, the former outside linebackers coach, is now responsible for cornerbacks, and Coach Christian-Young, the former cornerbacks coach, is now responsible for safeties. Additionally, assistant strength and conditioning coach Conor Hughes was promoted to head football strength and conditioning coach. On February 5, Coach Monken's last assistant coach position was filled with the announcement of the hire of Kevin Lewis as defensive line coach. Lewis had spent the previous five seasons as the defensive line coach at William & Mary

On February 19 it was announced that Rusty Whitt and GC Yerry had been hired to serve as the two assistant football strength and conditioning coaches, filling out the remaining open positions on Monken's staff. Whitt joined the staff after serving as the head football strength and conditioning coach at Texas Tech from 2016−2018, while Yerry joined after serving as the director of athletic performance at Stony Brook, also from 2016−2018.

On March 19, the West Point athletics department announced that Jim Collins would join the staff as the new Director of Player Personnel. Collins brings 25 years of head coaching experience at the Division II and Division III levels, including tenures as the head coach at the University of Dubuque from 1994−1996, Capital University (OH) from 1997−2007, and most recently at Saginaw Valley State from 2008−2018.

The Black Knights began their spring football session on March 7 and concluded it on April 12 with the annual Black and Gold Spring Game, where the Black team completed a fourth quarter comeback to win 35−28 in overtime. Following the conclusion of spring ball, rising firsties (Note: Unlike most U.S. universities, but in common with the other service academies, Army does not use the normal terminology of "freshman" through "senior" to classify its students. Cadets are referred to as "fourth-class" to "first-class", numbered in reverse order of the number of years in school. "Firsties", a widely used slang term for "first-class cadets", are thus equivalent to "seniors" at most civilian institutions.) Kelvin Hopkins Jr. and Elijah Riley were named team captains in addition to returning 2018 captain Cole Christiansen.

The Black Knights' fall camp began on August 1 and consisted of 14 practices, finishing on August 17 with an intrasquad scrimmage in Michie Stadium. Following the completion of camp, the Black Knights shifted their preparation to their Week 1 matchup with Rice. During August, the Black Knights received votes for the preseason AP and Coaches Polls, just missing out on starting within the Top 25 for the first time since 1959. They received a total of 94 points in the AP Poll and 91 points in the Coaches Poll, placing 2nd and 5th respectively in each poll's 'Also Receiving Votes' category.

=== Award watch lists ===
Listed in the order that they were released.

| Award | Player | Position | Year |
|---|---|---|---|
| Lott IMPACT Trophy | Cole Christiansen | LB | SR |
| Maxwell Award | Kelvin Hopkins Jr. | QB | SR |
| Chuck Bednarik Award | Elijah Riley | CB | SR |
| Davey O'Brien Award | Kelvin Hopkins Jr. | QB | SR |
| Rimington Trophy | Peyton Reeder | C | JR |
| Bronko Nagurski Trophy | Elijah Riley | CB | SR |
| Bobby Dodd Coach of the Year | Jeff Monken | HC | -- |
| Walter Camp Award | Kelvin Hopkins Jr. | QB | SR |
| CFPA National Performer of the Year | Kelvin Hopkins Jr. | QB | SR |
| Johnny Unitas Golden Arm Award | Kelvin Hopkins Jr. | QB | SR |
| Manning Award | Kelvin Hopkins Jr. | QB | SR |
| Mortell Award | Zach Potter | H | SR |

== Personnel ==
=== Coaching staff ===
| Name | Position | First year position | First year Army | Alma Mater |
|---|---|---|---|---|
| Jeff Monken | Head coach | 2014 | 2014 | Millikin |
Offensive staff
| Brent Davis | Offensive coordinator/offensive line | 2014 | 2014 | Georgia |
| Marcus Edwards | Wide receivers | 2018 | 2018 | South Florida |
| Sean Saturnio | Tight ends | 2018 | 2014 | Hawaii |
| Pat Tresey | Offensive line | 2018 | 2016 | Mount St. Joseph |
| Mike Viti | Fullbacks | 2016 | 2016 | Army |
| Mitch Ware | Quarterbacks | 2014 | 2014 | Southwest Missouri State |
| Tucker Waugh | Slotbacks | 2015 | 2007^{1} | DePauw |
Defensive staff
| John Loose | Defensive coordinator | 2019 | 2014^{2} | Ithaca |
| Josh Christian–Young | Safeties | 2019 | 2015 | Central Missouri |
| Kevin Corless | Inside Linebackers | 2014 | 2014 | Northwest Missouri State |
| Daryl Dixon | Cornerbacks | 2019 | 2016 | Florida |
| Matt Hachmann | Outside linebackers | 2019 | 2019 | St. Thomas (Minn.) |
| Kevin Lewis | Defensive line | 2019 | 2019 | Virginia Tech |
Special teams staff
| Mike Krysl | Special teams Coordinator | 2018 | 2018 | Central Missouri |
Quality control staff
| Matt Drinkall | Offensive quality control | 2019 | 2019 | Western Illinois–Quad Cities |
| Rick Lyster | Defensive quality control | 2019 | 2019 | Lafayette |
Strength and conditioning staff
| Scott Swanson | Director of Strength & Conditioning | 1998 | 1998^{3} | Wake Forest |
| Conor Hughes | Head Football Strength & Conditioning | 2019 | 2017 | Springfield College (Mass.) |
| Rusty Whitt | Assistant Football Strength & Conditioning | 2019 | 2019 | Abilene Christian |
| GC Yerry | Assistant Football Strength & Conditioning | 2019 | 2019 | Stony Brook |
Support staff
| Clayton Kendrick-Holmes | Chief of Staff/Director of Football Operations | 2018 | 2018 | Navy |
| CPT Zachary Reichert | Assistant director of Football Operations | 2019 | 2019 | Army |
| CPT Blake Powers | Admissions Support Officer | 2018 | 2018 | Indiana |
| Jim Collins | Director of player personnel | 2019 | 2019 | Wittenberg |
| Devon Doyle | Assistant director of Recruiting Operations | 2019 | 2019 | |
| Tanner Dupuis | Assistant director of Recruiting/Content | 2019 | 2019 | Georgia Southern |
| Danny Payne | Director of scouting | 2017 | 2017 | Kennesaw State |
| Brett Moore | Director of On-Campus Recruiting | 2017 | 2017 | Georgia Southern |
| Lawrence Scott | Director of Player Development | 2018 | 2018 | Army |
| Jack O'Reilly | Director of Video Operations | 2018 | 2018 | Clemson |
| Michael Zeoli | Assistant director of Video Operations | 2017 | 2017 | William Paterson |

1. Tucker Waugh also served as the wide receivers coach at Army from 2000 to 2004.
2. John Loose also served as the linebackers coach at Army from 1992 to 1999.
3. Scott Swanson also served as an Assistant Strength & Conditioning coach at Army from 1995 to 1996.

=== Roster ===
The Army football roster for the Week 1 game versus Rice (as of August 26, 2019):

2019 Army Black Knights roster
| Quarterback: 1 Jabari Laws, Sophomore (5'9, 185); 2 Tyhier Tyler, Sophomore (5'8, 185); 4 Cade Ballard, Freshman (5'9, 204); 5 Steven Migut, Freshman (6'0, 185); 7 Jemel Jones, Freshman (5'10, 199); 8 Kelvin Hopkins Jr., Senior (5'10, 205); 10 Maurice Bellan, Freshman (5'10, 179); 11 Walter Harris, Freshman (6'1, 224); 13 Christian Anderson, Junior (6'1, 185); 15 Clay Czyzynski, Sophomore (6'0, 220); 26 Cole Wright, Freshman (6'3, 185); 38 Kyle Terry, Freshman (6'0, 181); Slot Back: 5 Kell Walker, Senior (5'9, 195); 16 Malik Hancock, Senior (5'8, 180); 17 Colton Dooley, Freshman (5'11, 196); 19 Dominic Distefano, Junior (5'7, 180); 21 Zack Boobas, Junior (5'10, 180); 22 Markens Pierre, Sophomore (5'11, 205); 23 Adam Bazan, Freshman (5'10, 189); 25 Braheam Murphy, Freshman (5'10, 169); 27 Brandon Walters, Sophomore (5'11, 180); 29 A.J. Howard, Sophomore (6'0, 205); 30 Ton Evans, Sophomore (5'8, 180); 32 Artice Hobbs IV, Junior (5'9, 195); 37 Ridge Polk, Freshman (5'9, 167); Fullback: 3 Sandon McCoy, Junior (5'11, 235); 20 Anthony Adkins, Freshman (6'1, 251); 25 Connor Slomka, Senior (6'0, 240); 33 Jakobi Buchanan, Freshman (6'0, 178); 34 Rashaad Bolton, Senior (5'11, 250); 39 Noah West, Freshman (6'3, 225); 40 Cade Barnard, Sophomore (6'3, 245); 42 Cole Truex, Freshman (6'2, 221); 48 Kaelin Byrd, Sophomore (5'11, 205); Wide receiver: 6 Glen Coates, Senior (6'0, 195); 10 Jordan Blackman, Junior (5'11, 185); 14 Michael Roberts, Sophomore (6'3, 220); 36 Cole Caterbone, Freshman (6'1, 185); 49 Ben Koch, Freshman (6'6, 238); 80 Chris Gregg, Senior (6'0, 205); 80 Ryan Jackovic, Freshman (6'5, 220); 82 Kjetil Cline, Senior (6'0, 210); 82 Veshe Daniyan, Freshman (6'1, 170); 83 Reikan Donaldson, Freshman (6'2, 167); 84 Kevin Hamilton, Sophomore (6'1, 200); 85 Trenton Waggoner, Freshman (6'0, 184); 86 Christian Hayes, Senior (6'0, 205); 87 Sean Eckert, Sophomore (6'3, 215); 88 Camden Harrison, Junior (6'2, 210); 89 Jalen Moy, Sophomore (6'4, 210); Long snapper: 39 Paul Lawless, Junior (6'3, 225); 43 Clayton Cribb, Freshman (5'10, 234); 48 Kyle O'Connor, Junior (6'1, 230); 49 Patrick Szczesniak, Freshman (6'2, 225); 50 Ryan Aguilar, Freshman (6'2, 234); 89 Scott Flanick, Senior (6'2, 235) | Tight end: 39 Bryton Belvin, Sophomore (6'7, 230); 44 Shayne Buckingham, Freshman (6'4, 252); 46 Chris Cameron, Sophomore (6'4, 250); 81 Jake Lauer, Junior (6'3, 255); 83 Zach Saum, Senior (6'5, 250); 85 Eddie Crutchfield, Sophomore (6'3, 260); Offensive Lineman: 50 Robert Fitzsimmons, Freshman (6'5, 260); 51 Kameron Holloway, Sophomore (6'3, 275); 52 Alex Faulkner, Freshman (6'4, 277); 53 Carson Shaffer, Freshman (6'3, 308); 54 Blake Harris, Freshman (6'2, 275); 55 JB Hunter, Junior (6'4, 290); 56 Mason Kolinchak, Sophomore (6'2, 250); 57 Connor Bishop, Freshman (6'3, 271); 58 Sam Barczak, Freshman (6'2, 269); 59 Mike Johnson, Senior (6'3, 275); 60 Alex Herndon, Senior (6'2, 265); 62 Tino Arcuri, Freshman (6'3, 237); 63 Jake Baumert, Senior (6'3, 280); 64 Lachlan Holt, Freshman (6'2, 262); 65 Noah Knapp, Sophomore (6'0, 280); 66 DJ Fuller Jr., Freshman (6'3, 282); 67 Dean Powell, Sophomore (6'1, 290); 68 Luke McCleery, Junior (6'5, 290); 69 Dan Lord, Sophomore (6'5, 290); 70 Zach Ward, Sophomore (6'6, 280); 71 Daniel Parrish, Freshman (6'0, 279); 73 Jaxson Deaton, Senior (6'4, 305); 74 Jose Taveras, Freshman (6'4, 271); 75 Jack Sides, Senior (6'2, 290); 76 Peyton Reeder, Junior (6'6, 300); 77 Noah Utley, Senior (6'4, 285); 78 Cody Winokur, Freshman (6'2, 272); 79 Cade Hawley, Freshman (6'4, 246); 79 Nick Kotok, Sophomore (6'2, 280); Defensive Lineman: 18 Jake Ellington, Senior (6'3, 275); 50 Jacob Craig, Freshman (6'3, 227); 51 Grady Chapman, Freshman (6'4, 249); 55 Edriece Patterson, Junior (6'3, 265); 56 Nick Stokes, Junior (6'5, 285); 57 Jacob Covington, Senior (6'2, 275); 59 Henry Janeway, Freshman (6'4, 237); 60 David Gray, Freshman (6'4, 298); 62 Darius Richardson, Freshman (6'2, 258); 64 Tyler Komorowski, Freshman (6'3, 264); 72 Kenese Leomiti, Freshman (6'4, 293); 75 Ryan Bryce, Freshman (6'5, 264); 89 Chris Frey, Freshman (6'5, 255); 90 Jack Hough, Junior (6'3, 285); 91 Ryan Duran III, Sophomore (6'5, 265); 92 Reed Chandler, Freshman (6'3, 234); 93 Rod Stoddard, Senior (5'11, 280); 94 Conor Hough, Freshman (6'2, 218); 95 Nolan Cockrill, Sophomore (6'3, 285); 97 Kwabena Bonsu, Sophomore (6'4, 280); Punter: 17 Zach Potter, Senior (5'10, 200); 43 Brooks Hosea, Sophomore (6'0, 180); 46 Zach Harding, Sophomore (6'5, 210) | Linebacker: 11 Donavan Lynch, Senior (6'0, 228); 15 Ryan Parker, Senior (6'0, 230); 19 Troy Nachtigal, Freshman (5'10, 226); 30 Cameron Hoelscher, Freshman (6'2, 235); 31 Joe Stephenson, Junior (6'0, 225); 34 Jack King, Senior (6'2, 230); 36 Nate Jones, Sophomore (6'2, 260); 38 Brandon Mays, Freshman (6'0, 224); 40 Peyton Hampton, Freshman (6'1, 226); 42 Wilson Catoe, Sophomore (6'2, 235); 43 Jeremiah Lowery, Junior (6'2, 255); 44 Gavin Bassett, Junior (6'1, 230); 45 JT Penick, Freshman (6'3, 220); 46 Andre Carter II, Freshman (6'5, 230); 47 Jarrod Jones, Senior (5'10, 210); 47 Jon Rhattigan, Junior (6'1, 235); 48 Trevor Cosenke, Freshman (6'3, 233); 49 Kemonte Yow, Sophomore (6'1, 231); 52 Amadeo West, Senior (6'2, 240); 53 Arik Smith, Sophomore (6'0, 235); 54 Cole Christiansen, Senior (6'2, 235); 56 Delani Carter, Freshman (5'11, 221); 88 Nathaniel Smith, Freshman (6'3, 246); Defensive back: 1 Fabrice Voyne, Freshman (6'2, 217); 2 Malkelm Morrison, Sophomore (5'10, 187); 4 Akyah Miranda, Sophomore (5'9, 170); 5 Jason Longwell, Sophomore (5'11, 200); 6 Caleb John, Sophomore (5'10, 195); 7 Jaylon McClinton, Senior (5'10, 205); 8 Javhari Bourdeau, Junior (5'9, 185); 9 Ke'Shaun Wells, Junior (6'3, 210); 10 Marquel Broughton, Freshman (5'10, 198); 11 Elijah Boyd, Freshman (6'2, 180); 13 Chris Skyers, Junior (5'11, 185); 14 Mondo Walker, Freshman (5'11, 199); 15 Tim Boone, Freshman (5'9, 178); 16 D'Andre Tobias, Freshman (5'11, 189); 17 Isaiah Morris, Freshman (5'11, 168); 18 Cole Mabry, Freshman (6'2, 197); 19 Zion Davis–Thompson, Freshman (6'2, 185); 20 Cam Jones, Senior (6'0, 205); 21 Dean Ngendakuriyo, Junior (5'10, 190); 22 Cedrick Cunningham Jr., Sophomore (6'0, 205); 23 Elijah Riley, Senior (6'0, 210); 26 Quindrelin Hammonds, Freshman (6'0, 181); 26 Ryan Velez, Senior (5'11, 205); 27 Cameron Jones, Freshman (5'9, 170); 28 Justin Lescouflair, Freshman (5'10, 170); 28 Jabari Moore, Freshman (5'11, 190); 29 Izzy Akojie, Freshman (6'1, 180); 32 Jonathan Andrews, Sophomore (6'1, 210); 32 Daryan McDonald, Freshman (6'0, 215); Kicker: 1 Landon Salyers, Junior (6'1, 195); 6 Michael Leisle, Junior (6'0, 205); 27 Will Van Pamelen, Freshman (6'0, 204); 45 David Cooper, Senior (6'2, 185); 96 Cole Talley, Freshman (6'0, 216); 98 Matteo Cordray, Freshman (5'9, 170); 99 Andrew Bagley, Freshman (5'11, 180) |

=== Depth chart ===
The Army football depth chart for the 120th Army–Navy Game (as of December 9, 2019):

Defense

FS
Jaylon McClinton
Marquel Broughton
⋅

| RUSH | WILL | MIKE | SAM |
|---|---|---|---|
| Jeremiah Lowery | Arik Smith | Cole Christiansen | Donavan Lynch* |
| Donavan Lynch* | Ryan Parker | Kemonte Yow | Jack King |
| ⋅ | ⋅ | ⋅ | ⋅ |

BS
Cedrick Cunningham
Ryan Velez
⋅

CB
Javhari Bourdeau
Akyah Miranda*
⋅

| DE | NT | DE |
|---|---|---|
| Jacob Covington | Rod Stoddard | Kwabena Bonsu |
| OR Edriece Patterson | Nick Stokes | Nolan Cockrill |
| Jake Ellington | ⋅ | ⋅ |

CB
Elijah Riley*
Malkelm Morrison
⋅

Offense

WR
Kjetil Cline
Michael Roberts*
⋅

SB
Kell Walker
Malik Hancock
⋅

| LT | LG | C | RG | RT |
|---|---|---|---|---|
| Alex Herndon | Jaxson Deaton | JB Hunter | Peyton Reeder | Jack Sides |
| OR Luke McCleery* | OR Jake Baumert | OR Noah Knapp | OR Dean Powell | Luke McCleery* |
| Mike Johnson | Noah Utley | ⋅ | ⋅ | Kamaron Holloway |

SB
Artice Hobbs IV*
Brandon Walters*
OR Dominic Distefano

WR
Cam Harrison
Michael Roberts*
⋅

QB
Kelvin Hopkins Jr.
Jabari Laws
Christian Anderson

Key reserves
TE − Zach Saum*
Chris Cameron

KO – Landon Salyers*
Cole Talley*

FB
Sandon McCoy
Connor Slomka
⋅

Special teams
PK − Cole Talley*
Landon Salyers*
P − Zach Potter*
Zach Harding
KR − Artice Hobbs IV*
Brandon Walters*
A.J. Howard
PR − Akyah Miranda*
Elijah Riley*
LS − Kyle O'Connor
Scott Flanick
OR Zach Saum*
H − Zach Potter

Depth Chart 2019
True Freshman
Double Position : *

== Schedule ==
| Date | Time | Opponent | Site | TV | Result | Attendance |
|---|---|---|---|---|---|---|
| August 30 | 6:00 p.m. | Rice | Michie Stadium; West Point, NY | CBSSN | W 14–7 | 23,238 |
| September 7 | 12:00 p.m. | at No. 7 Michigan | Michigan Stadium; Ann Arbor, MI | FOX | L 21–24 ^{2OT} | 111,747 |
| September 14 | 3:30 p.m. | at UTSA | Alamodome; San Antonio, TX | NFLN | W 31–13 | 30,718 |
| September 21 | 12:00 p.m. | Morgan State | Michie Stadium; West Point, NY | CBSSN | W 52–21 | 28,018 |
| October 5 | 12:00 p.m. | Tulane^{†} | Michie Stadium; West Point, NY | CBSSN | L 33–42 | 38,019 |
| October 12 | 7:00 p.m. | at Western Kentucky | Houchens Industries–L. T. Smith Stadium; Bowling Green, KY | Stadium | L 8–17 | 16,107 |
| October 19 | 7:00 p.m. | at Georgia State | Georgia State Stadium; Atlanta, GA | ESPN+ | L 21–28 | 21,720 |
| October 26 | 12:00 p.m. | San Jose State | Michie Stadium; West Point, NY | CBSSN | L 29–34 | 35,346 |
| November 2 | 3:30 p.m. | at Air Force | Falcon Stadium; Colorado Springs, CO (Commander-in-Chief's Trophy) | CBSSN | L 13–17 | 41,401 |
| November 9 | 12:00 p.m. | UMass | Michie Stadium; West Point, NY | CBSSN | W 63–7 | 35,567 |
| November 16 | 12:00 p.m. | VMI | Michie Stadium; West Point, NY | CBSSN | W 47–6 | 25,747 |
| December 1 | 12:30 a.m. | at Hawaii | Aloha Stadium; Halawa, HI | CBSSN | L 31–52 | 26,256 |
| December 14 | 3:00 p.m. | vs. No. 23 Navy | Lincoln Financial Field; Philadelphia, PA (Army–Navy Game, Commander-in-Chief's Trophy, College GameDay) | CBS | L 7–31 | 68,705 |
^{†}Homecoming; Rankings from AP Poll and College Football Playoff Rankings after November 5 released prior to game; All times are in Eastern time

== Rankings ==
Ranking movements Legend: ██ Increase in ranking ██ Decrease in ranking — = Not ranked RV = Received votes
| | Week | | | | | | | | | | | | | | | | |
| Poll | Pre | 1 | 2 | 3 | 4 | 5 | 6 | 7 | 8 | 9 | 10 | 11 | 12 | 13 | 14 | 15 | Final |
|---|---|---|---|---|---|---|---|---|---|---|---|---|---|---|---|---|---|
| AP | RV | RV | RV | RV | RV | RV | — | — | — | — | — | — | — | — | — | — | — |
| Coaches | RV | RV | RV | RV | RV | RV | RV | — | — | — | — | — | — | — | — | — | — |
| CFP | Not released | | | | | | | | | | — | — | — | — | — | — | Not released |

== Game summaries ==
=== Rice ===
Rice Owls at Army Black Knights

| Quarter | 1 | 2 | 3 | 4 | Total |
|---|---|---|---|---|---|
| Owls | 0 | 7 | 0 | 0 | 7 |
| Black Knights | 0 | 7 | 0 | 7 | 14 |

at Michie Stadium, West Point, NY

- Date: August 30, 2019
- Game time: 6:00 p.m. EDT
- Game attendance: 23,238
- Referee: Jerry Magallanes
- TV announcers (CBSSN): Ben Holden (play-by-play), Ross Tucker (analyst) & Tina Cervasio (sideline)
- ESPN – Army holds off Rice 14–7 /// Box Score, Rice at Army /// Pregame Notes /// Postgame Notes

Game information

First Quarter
No scoring
Second Quarter

- (08:50) ARMY TD – Kelvin Hopkins Jr. 2-yard rush, Cole Talley kick
  Drive: 16 plays, 95 yards, 9:48; Army 7–0
- (06:30) RICE TD – Nahshon Ellerbe 54-yard rush, Will Harrison kick
  Drive: 4 plays, 75 yards, 2:20; Tied 7–7

Third Quarter
No scoring
Fourth Quarter

- (03:58) ARMY TD – Kell Walker 17-yard pass from Kelvin Hopkins Jr., Cole Talley kick
  Drive: 18 plays, 96 yards, 9:21; Army 14–7

Passing

- RICE – Wiley Green: 7/14, 62 yards
- ARMY – Kelvin Hopkins Jr.: 3/8, 53 yards, 1 TD

Rushing

- RICE – Nahshon Ellerbe: 9 carries, 103 yards, 1 TD
- ARMY – Kelvin Hopkins Jr.: 21 carries, 80 yards, 1 TD

Receiving

- RICE – Austin Trammell: 4 receptions, 40 yards
- ARMY – Artice Hobbs IV: 1 reception, 19 yards

| Statistics | RICE | ARMY |
|---|---|---|
| First downs | 10 | 17 |
| 3rd down efficiency | 3–11 | 9–15 |
| 4th down efficiency | 0–1 | 1–2 |
| Plays–yards | 44–243 | 64–284 |
| Rushes–yards | 30–181 | 56–231 |
| Passing yards | 62 | 53 |
| Passing: Comp–Att–Int | 7–14–0 | 3–8–0 |
| Penalties–yards | 3–20 | 4–26 |
| Turnovers | 0 | 1 |
| Time of possession | 25:09 | 34:51 |

=== At Michigan ===
Army Black Knights at No. 7 Michigan Wolverines

| Quarter | 1 | 2 | 3 | 4 | OT | 2OT | Total |
|---|---|---|---|---|---|---|---|
| Black Knights | 7 | 7 | 0 | 0 | 7 | 0 | 21 |
| No. 7 Wolverines | 7 | 0 | 7 | 0 | 7 | 3 | 24 |

at Michigan Stadium, Ann Arbor, MI

- Date: September 7, 2019
- Game time: 12:00 p.m. EDT
- Game weather: Temperature: Mid 70s °F • Wind: NW 10-15 mph • Weather: Cloudy
- Game attendance: 111,747
- Referee: Ron Snodgrass
- TV announcers (FOX): Gus Johnson (play-by-play), Joel Klatt (analyst) & Jenny Taft (sideline)
- ESPN – No. 7 Michigan holds on to beat Army 24–21 in 2 overtimes /// Box Score, Army at No. 7 Michigan /// Pregame Notes /// Postgame Notes

Game information

First Quarter

- (05:01) ARMY TD – Sandon McCoy 1-yard rush, Cole Talley kick
  Drive: 10 plays, 60 yards, 5:12; Army 7–0
- (00:24) MICH TD – Zach Charbonnet 2-yard rush, Quinn Nordin kick
  Drive: 11 plays, 70 yards, 4:37; Tied 7–7

Second Quarter

- (02:51) ARMY TD – Kelvin Hopkins Jr. 1-yard rush, Cole Talley kick
  Drive: 11 plays, 40 yards, 6:46; Army 14–7

Third Quarter

- (02:24) MICH TD – Zach Charbonnet 1-yard rush, Jake Moody kick
  Drive: 12 plays, 78 yards, 5:19; Tied 14–14

Fourth Quarter
No scoring
First Overtime

- ARMY TD – Kelvin Hopkins Jr. 6-yard rush, Cole Talley kick
  Drive: 5 plays, 25 yards, 0:00; Army 21–14
- MICH TD – Zach Charbonnet 3-yard rush, Jake Moody kick
  Drive: 4 plays, 25 yards, 0:00; Tied 21–21

Second Overtime

- MICH FG – Jake Moody 43-yard field goal
  Drive: 4 plays, 0 yards, 00:00; Michigan 24–21

Passing

- ARMY – Kelvin Hopkins Jr.: 2/4, 43 yards, 1 INT
- MICH – Shea Patterson: 19/29, 207 yards

Rushing

- ARMY – Connor Slomka: 29 carries, 92 yards
- MICH – Zach Charbonnet: 33 carries, 100 yards, 3 TD

Receiving

- ARMY – Artice Hobbs IV: 2 receptions, 43 yards
- MICH – Ronnie Bell: 7 receptions, 81 yards

| Statistics | ARMY | MICH |
|---|---|---|
| First downs | 15 | 23 |
| 3rd down efficiency | 5–16 | 9–16 |
| 4th down efficiency | 3–3 | 1–3 |
| Plays–yards | 66–243 | 76–340 |
| Rushes–yards | 61–200 | 45–108 |
| Passing yards | 43 | 232 |
| Passing: Comp–Att–Int | 2–5–1 | 20–31–0 |
| Penalties–yards | 8–78 | 9–58 |
| Turnovers | 3 | 3 |
| Time of possession | 31:35 | 28:25 |

=== At UTSA ===
Army Black Knights at UTSA Roadrunners

| Quarter | 1 | 2 | 3 | 4 | Total |
|---|---|---|---|---|---|
| Black Knights | 10 | 0 | 7 | 14 | 31 |
| Roadrunners | 0 | 0 | 7 | 6 | 13 |

at Alamodome, San Antonio, TX

- Date: September 14, 2019
- Game time: 2:30 p.m. CDT
- Game attendance: 30,718
- Referee: Jon Noll
- TV announcers (NFLN): Rhett Lewis (play-by-play), Max Starks (analyst) & Molly Sullivan (sideline)
- ESPN – Army rebounds to upend Texas–San Antonio, 31–13 /// Box Score, Army at UTSA /// Pregame Notes /// Postgame Notes

Game information

First Quarter

- (14:07) ARMY TD – Kell Walker 26-yard rush, David Cooper kick
  Drive: 3 plays, 75 yards, 0:53; Army 7–0
- (10:41) ARMY FG – David Cooper 40-yard field goal
  Drive: 5 plays, 16 yards, 2:33; Army 10–0

Second Quarter
No scoring
Third Quarter

- (08:02) UTSA TD – Lowell Narcisse 2-yard rush, Hunter Duplessis kick
  Drive: 13 plays, 65 yards, 6:58; Army 10–7
- (02:23) ARMY TD – Jabari Laws 41-yard rush, David Cooper kick
  Drive: 1 play, 41 yards, 0:11; Army 17–7

Fourth Quarter

- (10:43) ARMY TD – Kell Walker 16-yard rush, David Cooper kick
  Drive: 9 plays, 70 yards, 4:31; Army 24–7
- (08:50) UTSA TD – Sincere McCormick 7-yard rush, TEAM rush failed
  Drive: 6 plays, 32 yards, 1:53; Army 24–13
- (01:23) ARMY TD – Connor Slomka 3-yard rush, David Cooper kick
  Drive: 13 plays, 70 yards, 7:27; Army 31–13

Passing

- ARMY – Jabari Laws: 2/2, 18 yards
- UTSA – Frank Harris: 23/31, 187 yards, 1 INT

Rushing

- ARMY – Jabari Laws: 23 carries, 137 yards, 1 TD
- UTSA – Sincere McCormick: 5 carries, 27 yards, 1 TD

Receiving

- ARMY – Camden Harrison: 1 reception, 12 yards
- UTSA – Carlos Strickland II: 4 receptions, 38 yards

| Statistics | ARMY | UTSA |
|---|---|---|
| First downs | 22 | 13 |
| 3rd down efficiency | 5–9 | 5–13 |
| 4th down efficiency | 0–0 | 2–2 |
| Plays–yards | 57–358 | 60–260 |
| Rushes–yards | 55–340 | 27–51 |
| Passing yards | 18 | 209 |
| Passing: Comp–Att–Int | 2–2–0 | 24–33–1 |
| Penalties–yards | 5–30 | 7–54 |
| Turnovers | 2 | 3 |
| Time of possession | 30:33 | 29:27 |

=== Morgan State ===
Morgan State Bears at Army Black Knights

| Quarter | 1 | 2 | 3 | 4 | Total |
|---|---|---|---|---|---|
| Bears | 14 | 0 | 7 | 0 | 21 |
| Black Knights | 7 | 17 | 7 | 21 | 52 |

at Michie Stadium, West Point, NY

- Date: September 21, 2019
- Game time: 12:00 p.m. EDT
- Game attendance: 28,018
- Referee: Marcus Woods
- TV announcers (CBSSN): Ben Holden (play-by-play), Ross Tucker (analyst) & Tina Cervasio (sideline)
- ESPN – Army beats Morgan State 52–21 heading into bye week /// Box Score, Morgan State at Army /// Pregame Notes /// Postgame Notes

Game information

First Quarter

- (06:50) ARMY TD – Artice Hobbs IV 9-yard rush, David Cooper kick
  Drive: 9 plays, 77 yards, 4:58; Army 7–0
- (05:32) MSU TD – Manasseh Bailey 69-yard pass from DeAndre Harris, Nicholas O'Shea kick
  Drive: 3 plays, 65 yards, 1:18; Tied 7–7
- (03:29) MSU TD – Jabriel Johnson 25-yard rush, Nicholas O'Shea kick
  Drive: 1 play, 25 yards, 0:08; Morgan State 14–7

Second Quarter

- (14:54) ARMY TD – Sandon McCoy 11-yard rush, David Cooper kick
  Drive: 9 plays, 75 yards, 3:28; Tied 14–14
- (10:17) ARMY FG – David Cooper 35-yard field goal
  Drive: 8 plays, 13 yards, 3:37; Army 17–14
- (07:26) ARMY TD – Artice Hobbs IV 80-yard pass from Christian Anderson, David Cooper kick
  Drive: 1 play, 80 yards, 0:13; Army 24–14

Third Quarter

- (10:34) ARMY TD – Connor Slomka 3-yard rush, David Cooper kick
  Drive: 10 plays, 65 yards, 4:17; Army 31–14
- (03:47) MSU TD – Manasseh Bailey 23-yard pass from DeAndre Harris, Nicholas O'Shea kick
  Drive: 15 plays, 75 yards, 6:47; Army 31–21

Fourth Quarter

- (14:56) ARMY TD – Cade Barnard 3-yard rush, David Cooper kick
  Drive: 8 plays, 71 yards, 3:41; Army 38–21
- (10:11) ARMY TD – Rashaad Bolton 1-yard rush, David Cooper kick
  Drive: 2 plays, 5 yards, 0:29; Army 45–21
- (01:48) ARMY TD – Anthony Adkins 1-yard rush, Andrew Bagley kick
  Drive: 14 plays, 61 yards, 7:37; Army 52–21

Passing

- MSU – DeAndre Harris: 15/29, 230 yards, 2 TD, 3 INT
- ARMY – Christian Anderson: 1/7, 80 yards, 1 TD

Rushing

- MSU – Jabriel Johnson: 11 carries, 47 yards, 1 TD
- ARMY – Connor Slomka: 18 carries, 110 yards, 1 TD

Receiving

- MSU – Manasseh Bailey: 6 receptions, 121 yards, 2 TD
- ARMY – Artice Hobbs IV: 1 reception, 80 yards, 1 TD

| Statistics | MSU | ARMY |
|---|---|---|
| First downs | 12 | 30 |
| 3rd down efficiency | 6–16 | 4–11 |
| 4th down efficiency | 2–4 | 3–3 |
| Plays–yards | 60–308 | 76–483 |
| Rushes–yards | 31–78 | 69–403 |
| Passing yards | 230 | 80 |
| Passing: Comp–Att–Int | 15–29–3 | 1–7–0 |
| Penalties–yards | 11–72 | 7–50 |
| Turnovers | 4 | 2 |
| Time of possession | 25:20 | 34:40 |

=== Tulane ===
Tulane Green Wave at Army Black Knights

| Quarter | 1 | 2 | 3 | 4 | Total |
|---|---|---|---|---|---|
| Green Wave | 14 | 7 | 7 | 14 | 42 |
| Black Knights | 7 | 7 | 7 | 12 | 33 |

at Michie Stadium, West Point, NY

- Date: October 5, 2019
- Game time: 12:00 p.m. EDT
- Game attendance: 38,019
- Referee: Duane Heydt
- TV announcers (CBSSN): Ben Holden (play-by-play), Ross Tucker (analyst) & Tina Cervasio (sideline)
- ESPN – Tulane beats Army 42–33, snaps Black Knights' home streak /// Box Score, Tulane at Army /// Pregame Notes /// Postgame Notes

Game information

First Quarter

- (13:41) ARMY TD – Connor Slomka 2-yard rush, David Cooper kick
  Drive: 2 plays, 38 yards, 0:38; Army 7–0
- (10:53) TLN TD – Amare Jones 15-yard pass from Justin McMillan, Merek Glover kick
  Drive: 7 plays, 82 yards, 2:39; Tied 7–7
- (05:00) TLN TD – Corey Dauphine 30-yard rush, Merek Glover kick
  Drive: 9 plays, 84 yards, 4:11; Tulane 14–7

Second Quarter

- (13:12) TLN TD – Justin McMillan 1-yard rush, Merek Glover kick
  Drive: 7 plays, 90 yards, 2:52; Tulane 21–7
- (04:26) ARMY TD – Kelvin Hopkins Jr. 1-yard rush, David Cooper kick
  Drive: 15 plays, 77 yards, 8:39; Tulane 21–14

Third Quarter

- (11:31) ARMY TD – Kelvin Hopkins Jr. 4-yard rush, David Cooper kick
  Drive: 7 plays, 75 yards, 3:29; Tied 21–21
- (07:38) TLN TD – Darius Bradwell 13-yard rush, Merek Glover kick
  Drive: 10 plays, 77 yards, 3:46; Tulane 28–21

Fourth Quarter

- (10:27) TLN TD – Amare Jones 1-yard rush, Merek Glover kick
  Drive: 12 plays, 78 yards, 5:03; Tulane 35–21
- (05:46) TLN TD – Cameron Carroll 41-yard rush, Merek Glover kick
  Drive: 5 plays, 68 yards, 2:54; Tulane 42–21
- (02:55) ARMY TD – Cam Harrison 11-yard pass from Kelvin Hopkins Jr., Kelvin Hopkins Jr. rush failed
  Drive: 6 plays, 73 yards, 0:44; Tulane 42–27
- (02:36) ARMY TD – Jabari Moore 54-yard fumble return, Connor Slomka rush failed
  Drive: 0 plays, 0 yards, 0:00; Tulane 42–33

Passing

- TLN – Justin McMillan: 15/21, 201 yards, 1 TD
- ARMY – Kelvin Hopkins Jr.: 9/24, 170 yards, 1 TD, 1 INT

Rushing

- TLN – Corey Dauphine: 9 carries, 75 yards, 1 TD
- ARMY – Kelvin Hopkins Jr.: 24 carries, 132 yards, 2 TD

Receiving

- TLN – Amare Jones: 6 receptions, 104 yards, 1 TD
- ARMY – Cam Harrison: 5 receptions, 103 yards, 1 TD

| Statistics | TLN | ARMY |
|---|---|---|
| First downs | 28 | 21 |
| 3rd down efficiency | 7–12 | 6–15 |
| 4th down efficiency | 1–1 | 2–4 |
| Plays–yards | 74–525 | 68–363 |
| Rushes–yards | 53–324 | 44–193 |
| Passing yards | 201 | 170 |
| Passing: Comp–Att–Int | 15–21–0 | 9–24–1 |
| Penalties–yards | 9–79 | 4–34 |
| Turnovers | 2 | 1 |
| Time of possession | 31:07 | 28:53 |

=== At Western Kentucky ===
Army Black Knights at Western Kentucky Hilltoppers

| Quarter | 1 | 2 | 3 | 4 | Total |
|---|---|---|---|---|---|
| Black Knights | 0 | 0 | 0 | 8 | 8 |
| Hilltoppers | 7 | 0 | 3 | 7 | 17 |

at Houchens Industries–L. T. Smith Stadium, Bowling Green, KY

- Date: October 12, 2019
- Game time: 6:00 p.m. CDT
- Game weather: Temperature: 52 °F (11 °C) • Wind: Calm • Weather: Sunny and Clear
- Game attendance: 16,107
- Referee: Chris Bynum
- TV announcers (Stadium): Chris Vosters (play-by-play) & Jordan Palmer (analyst)
- ESPN – Storey's 2 TD runs help Western Kentucky beat Army 17–8 /// Box Score, Army at Western Kentucky /// Pregame Notes /// Postgame Notes

Game information

First Quarter

- (04:46) WKU TD – Ty Storey 1-yard rush, Cory Munson kick
  Drive: 11 plays, 70 yards, 5:24; Western Kentucky 7–0

Second Quarter
No scoring
Third Quarter

- (07:27) WKU FG – Cory Munson 22-yard field goal
  Drive: 15 plays, 74 yards, 7:33; Western Kentucky 10–0

Fourth Quarter

- (04:02) WKU TD – Ty Storey 1-yard rush, Cory Munson kick
  Drive: 17 plays, 80 yards, 9:25; Western Kentucky 17–0
- (01:41) ARMY TD – Malik Hancock 8-yard pass from Kelvin Hopkins Jr., Malik Hancock rush
  Drive: 11 plays, 75 yards, 2:21; Western Kentucky 17–8

Passing

- ARMY – Kelvin Hopkins Jr.: 5/12, 71 yards, 1 TD
- WKU – Ty Storey: 21/30, 140 yards

Rushing

- ARMY – Sandon McCoy: 11 carries, 41 yards
- WKU – Gaej Walker: 25 carries, 132 yards

Receiving

- ARMY – Artice Hobbs IV: 1 reception, 31 yards
- WKU – Lucky Jackson: 5 receptions, 45 yards

| Statistics | ARMY | WKU |
|---|---|---|
| First downs | 10 | 26 |
| 3rd down efficiency | 3–11 | 10–17 |
| 4th down efficiency | 2–2 | 2–3 |
| Plays–yards | 48–208 | 81–365 |
| Rushes–yards | 36–137 | 51–225 |
| Passing yards | 71 | 140 |
| Passing: Comp–Att–Int | 5–12–0 | 21–30–0 |
| Penalties–yards | 2–30 | 2–28 |
| Turnovers | 0 | 0 |
| Time of possession | 21:53 | 38:07 |

=== At Georgia State ===
Army Black Knights at Georgia State Panthers

| Quarter | 1 | 2 | 3 | 4 | Total |
|---|---|---|---|---|---|
| Black Knights | 7 | 7 | 7 | 0 | 21 |
| Panthers | 7 | 7 | 6 | 8 | 28 |

at Georgia State Stadium, Atlanta, GA

- Date: October 19, 2019
- Game time: 7:00 p.m. EDT
- Game weather: Temperature: 55 °F (13 °C) • Wind: 14 mph • Weather: Rain
- Game attendance: 21,720
- Referee: Kyle Olson
- TV announcers (ESPN+): Matt Stewart (play-by-play), Wayne Gandy (analyst) & Jael Rucker (sideline)
- ESPN – Ellington passes for 3 TDs in Georgia State's win over Army /// Box Score, Army at Georgia State /// Pregame Notes /// Postgame Notes

Game information

First Quarter

- (07:47) GSU TD – Sam Pinckney 24-yard pass from Dan Ellington, Brandon Wright kick
  Drive: 4 plays, 57 yards, 1:22; Georgia State 7–0
- (02:18) ARMY TD – Sandon McCoy 2-yard rush, Cole Talley kick
  Drive: 9 plays, 75 yards, 5:29; Tied 7–7

Second Quarter

- (07:41) GSU TD – Sam Pinckney 12-yard pass from Dan Ellington, Brandon Wright kick
  Drive: 3 plays, 46 yards, 1:08; Georgia State 14–7
- (01:15) ARMY TD – Sandon McCoy 8-yard rush, Cole Talley kick
  Drive: 12 plays, 75 yards, 6:26; Tied 14–14

Third Quarter

- (08:17) ARMY TD – Jalen Moy 16-yard rush, Cole Talley kick
  Drive: 12 plays, 75 yards, 6:43; Army 21–14
- (01:48) GSU TD – Tra Barnett 1-yard rush, Brandon Wright kick failed
  Drive: 16 plays, 75 yards, 6:29; Army 21–20

Fourth Quarter

- (07:41) GSU TD – Aubry Payne 8-yard pass from Dan Ellington, Roger Carter pass
  Drive: 11 plays, 81 yards, 5:28; Georgia State 28–21

Passing

- ARMY – Kelvin Hopkins Jr.: 6/10, 65 yards, 1 INT
- GSU – Dan Ellington: 20/28, 232 yards, 3 TD

Rushing

- ARMY – Connor Slomka: 10 carries, 89 yards
- GSU – Tra Barnett: 17 carries, 108 yards, 1 TD

Receiving

- ARMY – Cam Harrison: 4 receptions, 58 yards
- GSU – Cornelius McCoy: 7 receptions, 66 yards

| Statistics | ARMY | GSU |
|---|---|---|
| First downs | 20 | 23 |
| 3rd down efficiency | 6–15 | 6–10 |
| 4th down efficiency | 6–8 | 1–2 |
| Plays–yards | 72–343 | 60–379 |
| Rushes–yards | 61–278 | 32–147 |
| Passing yards | 65 | 232 |
| Passing: Comp–Att–Int | 6–11–1 | 20–28–0 |
| Penalties–yards | 3–25 | 1–5 |
| Turnovers | 2 | 1 |
| Time of possession | 38:08 | 21:52 |

=== San Jose State ===
San Jose State Spartans at Army Black Knights

| Quarter | 1 | 2 | 3 | 4 | Total |
|---|---|---|---|---|---|
| Spartans | 7 | 16 | 0 | 11 | 34 |
| Black Knights | 7 | 3 | 7 | 12 | 29 |

at Michie Stadium, West Point, NY

- Date: October 26, 2019
- Game time: 12:00 p.m. EDT
- Game attendance: 35,346
- Referee: Marcus Woods
- TV announcers (CBSSN): Ben Holden (play-by-play), Ross Tucker (analyst) & Tina Cervasio (sideline)
- ESPN – San Jose State beats Army 34–29 at Michie Stadium /// Box Score, San Jose State at Army /// Pregame Notes /// Postgame Notes

Game information

First Quarter

- (11:44) SJSU TD – Isaiah Hamilton 19-yard pass from Josh Love, Matt Mercurio kick
  Drive: 8 plays, 77 yards, 3:16; San Jose State 7–0
- (01:59) ARMY TD – Cam Harrison 31-yard pass from Kelvin Hopkins Jr., Cole Talley kick
  Drive: 15 plays, 87 yards, 9:45; Tied 7–7

Second Quarter

- (14:42) SJSU FG – Matt Mercurio 30-yard field goal
  Drive: 8 plays, 68 yards, 2:09; San Jose State 10–7
- (11:36) SJSU TD – Kairee Robinson 18-yard pass from Josh Love, Matt Mercurio kick
  Drive: 4 plays, 44 yards, 1:43; San Jose State 17–7
- (05:37) SJSU FG – Matt Mercurio 23-yard field goal
  Drive: 5 plays, 42 yards, 2:01; San Jose State 20–7
- (00:52) ARMY FG – Cole Talley 41-yard field goal
  Drive: 14 plays, 51 yards, 4:45; San Jose State 20–10
- (00:02) SJSU FG – Matt Mercurio 38-yard field goal
  Drive: 4 plays, 18 yards, 0:38; San Jose State 23–10

Third Quarter

- (08:09) ARMY TD – Sandon McCoy 4-yard rush, Cole Talley kick
  Drive: 13 plays, 75 yards, 6:51; San Jose State 23–17

Fourth Quarter

- (14:53) SJSU TD – Bailey Gaither 21-yard pass from Josh Love, Tre Walker pass
  Drive: 6 plays, 55 yards, 2:49; San Jose State 31–17
- (08:42) ARMY TD – Christian Anderson 1-yard rush, TEAM rush fumbled
  Drive: 13 plays, 69 yards, 6:05; San Jose State 31–23
- (03:48) SJSU FG – Matt Mercurio 28-yard field goal
  Drive: 9 plays, 65 yards, 4:54; San Jose State 34–23
- (00:31) ARMY TD – Christian Anderson 33-yard rush, Christian Anderson pass failed
  Drive: 8 plays, 71 yards, 1:13; San Jose State 34–29

Passing

- SJSU – Josh Love: 20/31, 314 yards, 3 TD
- ARMY – Kelvin Hopkins Jr.: 2/3, 50 yards, 1 TD

Rushing

- SJSU – DeJon Packer: 9 carries, 63 yards
- ARMY – Christian Anderson: 16 carries, 87 yards, 2 TD

Receiving

- SJSU – Tre Walker: 6 receptions, 94 yards
- ARMY – Cam Harrison: 4 receptions, 54 yards, 1 TD

| Statistics | SJSU | ARMY |
|---|---|---|
| First downs | 19 | 28 |
| 3rd down efficiency | 5–10 | 11–17 |
| 4th down efficiency | 0–1 | 2–4 |
| Plays–yards | 49–402 | 83–429 |
| Rushes–yards | 18–88 | 70–326 |
| Passing yards | 314 | 103 |
| Passing: Comp–Att–Int | 20–31–0 | 7–13–0 |
| Penalties–yards | 3–16 | 9–74 |
| Turnovers | 0 | 1 |
| Time of possession | 20:58 | 39:02 |

=== At Air Force ===
Army Black Knights at Air Force Falcons

| Quarter | 1 | 2 | 3 | 4 | Total |
|---|---|---|---|---|---|
| Black Knights | 0 | 6 | 7 | 0 | 13 |
| Falcons | 0 | 3 | 7 | 7 | 17 |

at Falcon Stadium, Colorado Springs, CO

- Date: November 2, 2019
- Game time: 1:30 p.m. MDT
- Game weather: Temperature: 51 °F (11 °C) • Wind: SSE 5 mph • Weather: Fair
- Game attendance: 41,401
- Referee: Stuart Mullins
- TV announcers (CBSSN): Ben Holden (play-by-play), Ross Tucker (analyst) & John Schriffen (sideline)
- ESPN – Air Force makes late defensive stand in 17–13 win over Army /// Box Score, Army at Air Force /// Pregame Notes /// Postgame Notes

Game information

First Quarter
No scoring
Second Quarter

- (08:08) AF FG – Jake Koehnke 20-yard field goal
  Drive: 9 plays, 77 yards, 4:53; Air Force 3–0
- (01:17) ARMY TD – Jabari Laws 2-yard rush, Cole Talley kick failed
  Drive: 11 plays, 65 yards, 6:51; Army 6–3

Third Quarter

- (02:35) AF TD – Timothy Jackson 3-yard rush, Jake Koehnke kick
  Drive: 9 plays, 64 yards, 4:20; Air Force 10–6
- (02:22) ARMY TD – Cam Harrison 87-yard pass from Jabari Laws, Cole Talley kick
  Drive: 1 play, 87 yards, 0:13; Army 13–10

Fourth Quarter

- (13:08) AF TD – Joshua Stoner 5-yard rush, Jake Koehnke kick
  Drive: 9 plays, 74 yards, 4:08; Air Force 17–13

Passing

- ARMY – Jabari Laws: 9/11, 214 yards, 1 TD
- AF – Donald Hammond III: 1/6, 19 yards, 1 INT

Rushing

- ARMY – Sandon McCoy: 8 carries, 67 yards
- AF – Timothy Jackson: 20 carries, 155 yards, 1 TD

Receiving

- ARMY – Cam Harrison: 3 receptions, 103 yards, 1 TD
- AF – Geraud Sanders: 1 reception, 19 yards

| Statistics | ARMY | AF |
|---|---|---|
| First downs | 14 | 17 |
| 3rd down efficiency | 5–13 | 5–13 |
| 4th down efficiency | 1–3 | 1–1 |
| Plays–yards | 52–343 | 63–344 |
| Rushes–yards | 38–129 | 55–328 |
| Passing yards | 214 | 16 |
| Passing: Comp–Att–Int | 9–14–0 | 2–8–1 |
| Penalties–yards | 7–47 | 5–28 |
| Turnovers | 0 | 1 |
| Time of possession | 27:43 | 32:17 |

=== UMass ===
UMass Minutemen at Army Black Knights

| Quarter | 1 | 2 | 3 | 4 | Total |
|---|---|---|---|---|---|
| Minutemen | 7 | 0 | 0 | 0 | 7 |
| Black Knights | 14 | 21 | 14 | 14 | 63 |

at Michie Stadium, West Point, NY

- Date: November 9, 2019
- Game time: 12:00 p.m. EST
- Game weather: Temperature: 38 °F (3 °C) • Wind: SSW 9 mph • Weather: Sunny, Breezy, Cold
- Game attendance: 35,567
- Referee: Mike Roche
- TV announcers (CBSSN): Ben Holden (play-by-play), Ross Tucker (analyst) & Tina Cervasio (sideline)
- ESPN – McCoy scores 3 times, Army beats UMass 63–7 to snap skid /// Box Score, UMass at Army /// Pregame Notes /// Postgame Notes

Game information

First Quarter

- (11:14) ARMY TD – Sandon McCoy 4-yard rush, Cole Talley kick
  Drive: 5 plays, 52 yards, 2:11; Army 7–0
- (09:55) UMASS TD – Kyle Horn 56-yard pass from Andrew Brito, Cooper Garcia kick
  Drive: 4 plays, 68 yards, 1:12; Tied 7–7
- (04:00) ARMY TD – Sandon McCoy 4-yard rush, Cole Talley kick
  Drive: 11 plays, 75 yards, 5:55; Army 14–7

Second Quarter

- (11:48) ARMY TD – Sandon McCoy 5-yard rush, Cole Talley kick
  Drive: 12 plays, 73 yards, 6:07; Army 21–7
- (09:34) ARMY TD – Connor Slomka 3-yard rush, Cole Talley kick
  Drive: 2 plays, 12 yards, 0:50; Army 28–7
- (00:56) ARMY TD – Artice Hobbs IV 3-yard rush, Cole Talley kick
  Drive: 3 plays, 9 yards, 1:23; Army 35–7

Third Quarter

- (11:54) ARMY TD – Jabari Laws 83-yard rush, Cole Talley kick
  Drive: 1 play, 83 yards, 0:16; Army 42–7
- (02:33) ARMY TD – Kelvin Hopkins Jr. 9-yard rush, Cole Talley kick
  Drive: 6 plays, 60 yards, 2:57; Army 49–7

Fourth Quarter

- (09:55) ARMY TD – Cade Barnard 2-yard rush, David Cooper kick
  Drive: 11 plays, 60 yards, 5:10; Army 56–7
- (00:55) ARMY TD – Jemel Jones 4-yard rush, David Cooper kick
  Drive: 13 plays, 70 yards, 7:10; Army 63–7

Passing

- UMASS – Andrew Brito: 6/16, 75 yards, 1 TD, 1 INT
- ARMY – Jabari Laws: 3/5, 48 yards

Rushing

- UMASS – Bilal Ally: 10 carries, 26 yards
- ARMY – Jabari Laws: 8 carries, 140 yards, 1 TD

Receiving

- UMASS – Kyle Horn: 1 reception, 56 yards, 1 TD
- ARMY – Artice Hobbs IV: 1 reception, 30 yards

| Statistics | UMASS | ARMY |
|---|---|---|
| First downs | 7 | 34 |
| 3rd down efficiency | 2–12 | 7–11 |
| 4th down efficiency | 1–3 | 2–2 |
| Plays–yards | 48–125 | 84–546 |
| Rushes–yards | 26–26 | 78–498 |
| Passing yards | 99 | 48 |
| Passing: Comp–Att–Int | 9–22–2 | 3–6–0 |
| Penalties–yards | 5–44 | 2–20 |
| Turnovers | 2 | 1 |
| Time of possession | 18:47 | 41:13 |

=== VMI ===
VMI Keydets at Army Black Knights

| Quarter | 1 | 2 | 3 | 4 | Total |
|---|---|---|---|---|---|
| Keydets | 3 | 3 | 0 | 0 | 6 |
| Black Knights | 7 | 7 | 19 | 14 | 47 |

at Michie Stadium, West Point, NY

- Date: November 16, 2019
- Game time: 12:00 p.m. EST
- Game attendance: 25,747
- Referee: Riley Johnson
- TV announcers (CBSSN): Ben Holden (play-by-play), Ross Tucker (analyst) & Tina Cervasio (sideline)
- ESPN – Army closes home slate with 47–6 win over VMI /// Box Score, VMI at Army /// Pregame Notes /// Postgame Notes

Game information

First Quarter

- (11:44) VMI FG – Grant Clemons 47-yard field goal
  Drive: 8 plays, 22 yards, 3:16; VMI 3–0
- (07:17) ARMY TD – Jabari Laws 4-yard rush, Cole Talley kick
  Drive: 9 plays, 75 yards, 4:27; Army 7–3

Second Quarter

- (06:34) VMI FG – Grant Clemons 37-yard field goal
  Drive: 16 plays, 60 yards, 5:57; Army 7–6
- (03:08) ARMY TD – Connor Slomka 3-yard rush, David Cooper kick
  Drive: 7 plays, 64 yards, 3:17; Army 14–6

Third Quarter

- (07:46) ARMY TD – Kell Walker 59-yard rush, David Cooper kick
  Drive: 10 plays, 99 yards, 5:21; Army 21–6
- (05:07) ARMY TD – Connor Slomka 3-yard rush, David Cooper kick failed
  Drive: 3 plays, 27 yards, 1:24; Army 27–6
- (01:30) ARMY TD – Kelvin Hopkins Jr. 63-yard rush, Zach Potter kick failed
  Drive: 2 plays, 65 yards, 1:07; Army 33–6

Fourth Quarter

- (14:23) ARMY TD – Connor Slomka 8-yard rush, David Cooper kick
  Drive: 4 plays, 39 yards, 1:54; Army 40–6
- (05:17) ARMY TD – Christian Anderson 4-yard rush, David Cooper kick
  Drive: 12 plays, 90 yards, 7:20; Army 47–6

Passing

- VMI – Reece Udinski: 22/34, 218 yards
- ARMY – Kelvin Hopkins Jr.: 4/7, 49 yards, 1 INT

Rushing

- VMI – Alex Ramsey: 14 carries, 50 yards
- ARMY – Kelvin Hopkins Jr.: 16 carries, 208 yards, 1 TD

Receiving

- VMI – Jakob Herres: 7 receptions, 83 yards
- ARMY – Cam Harrison: 3 receptions, 48 yards

| Statistics | VMI | ARMY |
|---|---|---|
| First downs | 14 | 29 |
| 3rd down efficiency | 5–15 | 7–9 |
| 4th down efficiency | 1–3 | 1–1 |
| Plays–yards | 58–271 | 72–643 |
| Rushes–yards | 21–40 | 65–594 |
| Passing yards | 231 | 49 |
| Passing: Comp–Att–Int | 23–37–0 | 4–7–1 |
| Penalties–yards | 3–24 | 3–35 |
| Turnovers | 1 | 1 |
| Time of possession | 23:25 | 36:35 |

=== At Hawaii ===
Army Black Knights at Hawaii Rainbow Warriors

| Quarter | 1 | 2 | 3 | 4 | Total |
|---|---|---|---|---|---|
| Black Knights | 10 | 7 | 14 | 0 | 31 |
| Rainbow Warriors | 10 | 14 | 14 | 14 | 52 |

at Aloha Stadium, Honolulu, HI

- Date: November 30, 2019
- Game time: 7:30 p.m. HST
- Game weather: Temperature: 78 °F (26 °C) • Wind: ENE 15 mph • Weather: Cloudy, Nice Sunset
- Game attendance: 26,256
- Referee: David Alvarez
- TV announcers (CBSSN): Ben Holden (play-by-play) & Ross Tucker (analyst)
- ESPN – McDonald's 3 TD passes help Hawaii beat Army 52–31 /// Box Score, Army at Hawaii /// Pregame Notes /// Postgame Notes

Game information

First Quarter

- (13:16) ARMY TD – Sandon McCoy 3-yard rush, David Cooper kick
  Drive: 4 plays, 75 yards, 1:44; Army 7–0
- (09:45) HAW FG – Ryan Meskell 42-yard field goal
  Drive: 8 plays, 51 yards, 3:31; Army 7–3
- (03:31) ARMY FG – David Cooper 32-yard field goal
  Drive: 11 plays, 60 yards, 6:14; Army 10–3
- (02:33) HAW TD – Jason-Matthew Sharsh 26-yard pass from Chevan Cordiero, Ryan Meskell kick
  Drive: 2 plays, 56 yards, 0:50; Tied 10–10

Second Quarter

- (13:40) ARMY TD – Sandon McCoy 7-yard rush, David Cooper kick
  Drive: 8 plays, 75 yards, 3:53; Army 17–10
- (08:08) HAW TD – Cedric Byrd II 25-yard pass from Chevan Cordiero, Ryan Meskell kick
  Drive: 1 play, 25 yards, 0:06; Tied 17–17
- (02:40) HAW TD – Jason-Matthew Sharsh 4-yard pass from Cole McDonald, Ryan Meskell kick
  Drive: 7 plays, 33 yards, 3:09; Hawaii 24–17

Third Quarter

- (12:31) HAW TD – Miles Reed 1-yard rush, Ryan Meskell kick
  Drive: 6 plays, 76 yards, 2:25; Hawaii 31–17
- (10:49) ARMY TD – Connor Slomka 30-yard rush, David Cooper kick
  Drive: 4 plays, 75 yards, 1:42; Hawaii 31–24
- (05:30) HAW TD – JoJo Ward 7-yard pass from Cole McDonald, Ryan Meskell kick
  Drive: 11 plays, 73 yards, 5:19; Hawaii 38–24
- (01:26) ARMY TD – Malik Hancock 10-yard rush, David Cooper kick
  Drive: 8 plays, 75 yards, 4:04; Hawaii 38–31

Fourth Quarter

- (03:51) HAW TD – Jared Smart 20-yard pass from Cole McDonald, Ryan Meskell kick
  Drive: 6 plays, 70 yards, 2:43; Hawaii 45–31
- (01:34) HAW TD – Rojesterman Farris II 100-yard interception return, Ryan Meskell kick
  Drive: 0 plays, 0 yards, 0:00; Hawaii 52–31

Passing

- ARMY – Kelvin Hopkins Jr.: 1/3, 69 yards, 1 INT
- HAW – Cole McDonald: 19/29, 250 yards, 3 TD

Rushing

- ARMY – Christian Anderson: 12 carries, 114 yards
- HAW – Miles Reed: 10 carries, 92 yards, 1 TD

Receiving

- ARMY – Artice Hobbs IV: 1 reception, 69 yards
- HAW – Jared Smart: 8 receptions, 123 yards, 1 TD

| Statistics | ARMY | HAW |
|---|---|---|
| First downs | 23 | 25 |
| 3rd down efficiency | 4–12 | 4–8 |
| 4th down efficiency | 1–4 | 0–0 |
| Plays–yards | 74–538 | 60–492 |
| Rushes–yards | 63–411 | 19–133 |
| Passing yards | 127 | 359 |
| Passing: Comp–Att–Int | 5–11–2 | 26–41–0 |
| Penalties–yards | 3–29 | 4–36 |
| Turnovers | 2 | 0 |
| Time of possession | 35:20 | 24:40 |

=== Vs. Navy ===
Army Black Knights vs. No. 23 Navy Midshipmen (120th Army-Navy Game)

| Quarter | 1 | 2 | 3 | 4 | Total |
|---|---|---|---|---|---|
| Black Knights | 7 | 0 | 0 | 0 | 7 |
| No. 23 Midshipmen | 0 | 14 | 7 | 10 | 31 |

at Lincoln Financial Field, Philadelphia, PA

- Date: December 14, 2019
- Game time: 3:00 p.m. EST
- Game weather: Temperature: 55 °F (13 °C) • Wind: S 10-15 mph • Weather: Light Drizzle
- Game attendance: 68,705
- Referee: Mike Roche
- TV announcers (CBS): Brad Nessler (play-by-play), Gary Danielson (analyst) & Jamie Erdahl (sideline)
- ESPN – Sea, by ground: Perry runs for 304 in Navy rout /// Box Score, Army vs. No 23 Navy /// Pregame Notes /// Postgame Notes

Game information

First Quarter

- (00:27) ARMY TD – Christian Anderson 5-yard rush, David Cooper kick
  Drive: 18 plays, 78 yards, 10:41; Army 7–0

Second Quarter

- (13:34) NAVY TD – Malcolm Perry 55-yard rush, Bijan Nichols kick
  Drive: 4 plays, 75 yards, 1:53; Tied 7–7
- (00:06) NAVY TD – Jamale Carothers 1-yard pass from Chance Warren, Bijan Nichols kick
  Drive: 12 plays, 91 yards, 4:36; Navy 14–7

Third Quarter

- (04:53) NAVY TD – Jamale Carothers 5-yard rush, Bijan Nichols kick
  Drive: 7 plays, 45 yards, 3:53; Navy 21–7

Fourth Quarter

- (12:48) NAVY FG – Bijan Nichols 37-yard field goal
  Drive: 9 plays, 40 yards, 5:27; Navy 24–7
- (01:42) NAVY TD – Malcolm Perry 15-yard rush, Bijan Nichols kick
  Drive: 6 plays, 47 yards, 3:17; Navy 24–7

Passing

- ARMY – Christian Anderson: 2/4, 18 yards
- NAVY – Chance Warren: 1/1, 1 yard, 1 TD

Rushing

- ARMY – Christian Anderson: 21 carries, 56 yards, 1 TD
- NAVY – Malcolm Perry: 29 carries, 304 yards, 2 TD

Receiving

- ARMY – Cam Harrison: 2 receptions, 18 yards
- NAVY – Jamale Carothers: 1 reception, 1 yard, 1 TD

| Statistics | ARMY | NAVY |
|---|---|---|
| First downs | 9 | 17 |
| 3rd down efficiency | 4–14 | 7–12 |
| 4th down efficiency | 2–3 | 0–0 |
| Plays–yards | 53–148 | 56–396 |
| Rushes–yards | 47–123 | 55–395 |
| Passing yards | 25 | 1 |
| Passing: Comp–Att–Int | 3–6–1 | 1–1–0 |
| Penalties–yards | 3–18 | 1–15 |
| Turnovers | 2 | 0 |
| Time of possession | 27:41 | 32:19 |
