= Mount Trashmore =

Mount Trashmore may refer to:

- Mount Trashmore (Florida), a landfill site in Broward County, Florida
- Mount Trashmore (Illinois), a landfill site, now part of James Park in Evanston, Illinois
- Mount Trashmore Park, a park in Virginia Beach, Virginia
