= Mount Trashmore (Illinois) =

Hill in Evanston, Illinois, U.S.

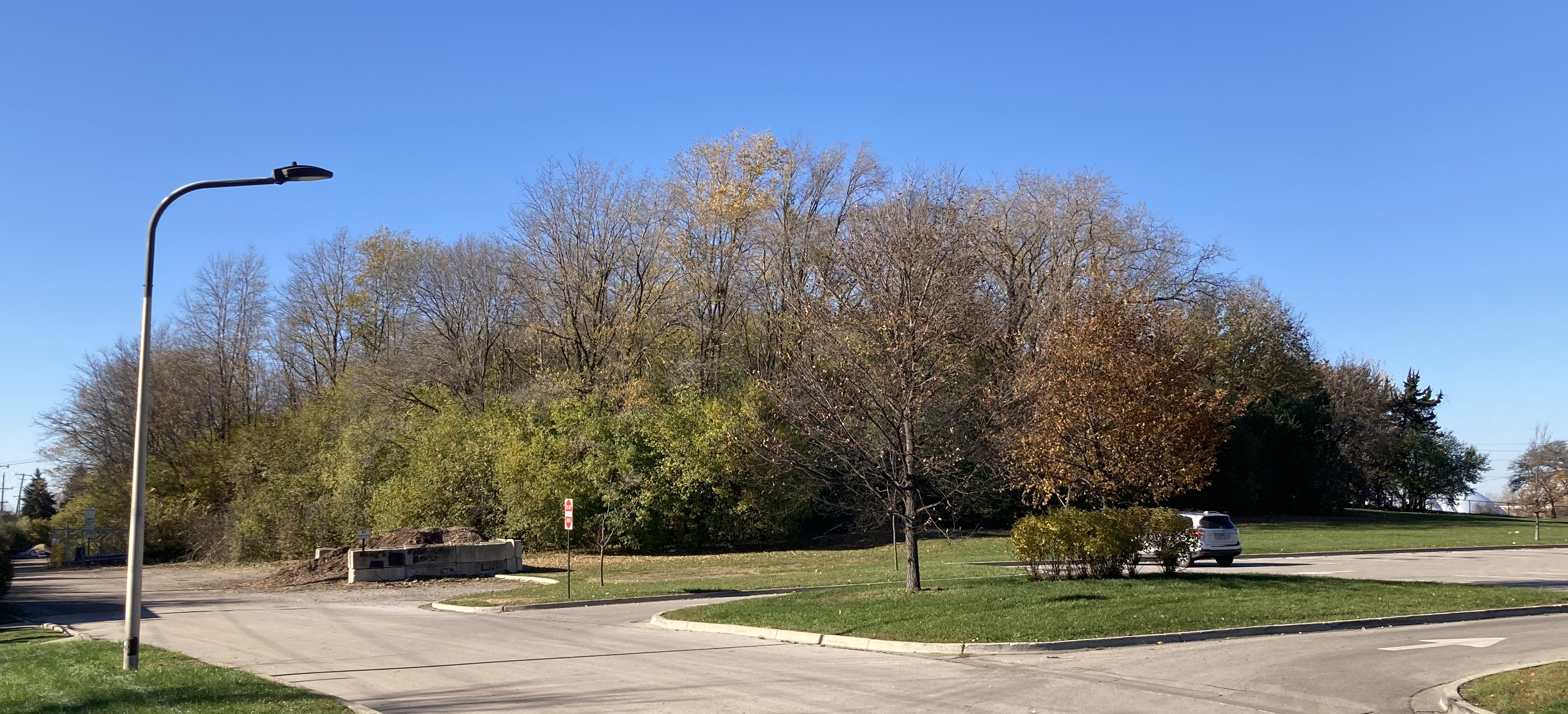

Highest point
- Elevation: 65 ft (20 m)
- Coordinates: 42.023452°N 87.705597°W

Geography
- Country: United States
- Settlement: Evanston, Illinois

Mount Trashmore is a 65 ft. hill located in Robert E. James Park in Evanston, Illinois. Mount Trashmore is an example of landfill restoration as it was a solid waste landfill that was closed and converted into a park in 1965.

In 1973, Evanston began allowing skiing on Mount Trashmore, installing a tow rope and snow making machines.

Since skiing was prohibited in the 1980s, Mount Trashmore remained a popular sledding and tobogganing hill in the winter, as well as a popular destination for runners and hikers in the summer.

In the summer of 1995, Northwestern University football strength and conditioning director Larry Lilja planted a small Rose Bowl flag at the top of Mount Trashmore and had the Wildcats repeatedly run up the mountain. They went on to play in the 1996 Rose Bowl on January 1, 1996.
