= Cole Christiansen =

American football player (born 1997)

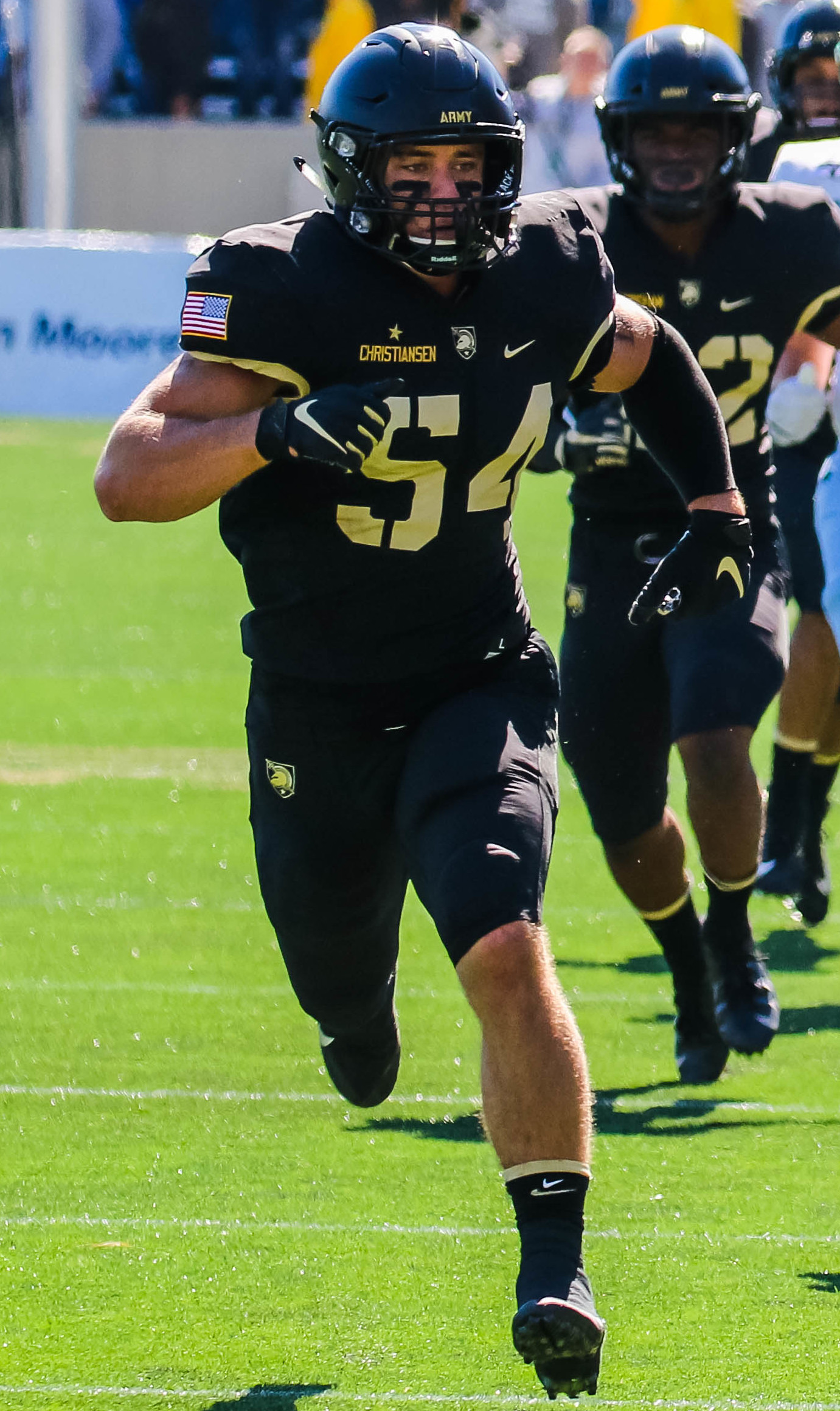
- Christiansen with Army in 2019

Profile
- Position: Linebacker

Personal information
- Born: July 30, 1997 (age 29); Suffolk, Virginia, U.S.
- Listed height: 6 ft 1 in (1.85 m)
- Listed weight: 230 lb (104 kg)

Career information
- High school: Nansemond-Suffolk Academy
- College: Army (2016–2019)
- NFL draft: 2020: undrafted

Career history
- Los Angeles Chargers (2020–2021); Kansas City Chiefs (2022–2026)

Awards and highlights
- 2× Super Bowl champion (LVII, LVIII)

Career NFL statistics as of 2025
- Total tackles: 8
- Stats at Pro Football Reference

Cole Jennings Christiansen (born July 30, 1997) is an American professional football linebacker. He played college football for the Army Black Knights.

== Early life ==
Christiansen grew up on a horse farm in Suffolk, Virginia, and attended Nansemond-Suffolk Academy, where he played football and lacrosse. He was named the Virginia Independent Schools Athletic Association Defensive Player of the Year and the Tidewater Conference Player of the Year as a junior and as a senior.

== College career ==
Christiansen played for the Army Black Knights for four seasons. He became a starter in his sophomore season and finished second on the team with 84 tackles and was named a team captain going into his junior year. Christiansen finished second in tackles again as a junior with 77 while also leading the team with 12 tackles for loss. As a senior, he led the Black Knights with 112 tackles, with 3.5 tackles for loss, 2.5 sacks and two forced fumbles. Christiansen finished his collegiate career with 275 tackles.

== Professional career ==
Pre-draft measurables
Height	Weight	Arm length	Hand span	Wingspan
6 ft 0 3/4 in (1.85 m)	230 lb (104 kg)	31 1/2 in (0.80 m)	9 7/8 in (0.25 m)	6 ft 2 5/8 in (1.90 m)
All values from Pro Day

=== Los Angeles Chargers ===
Christiansen signed with the Los Angeles Chargers as an undrafted free agent on April 25, 2020, after receiving a waiver that allowed him to serve in the reserves and delay his active duty commitment until after his playing career is over. He was waived by the Chargers during final roster cuts on September 5, but was re–signed to the team's practice squad the next day. Christiansen was elevated to the active roster on November 21, November 28, and December 5 for the team's Weeks 11, 12, and 13 games against the New York Jets, Buffalo Bills, and New England Patriots, and reverted to the practice squad after each game. He was promoted to the active roster on January 1, 2021.

On August 31, 2021, Christiansen was waived by the Chargers and re-signed to the practice squad the next day. He signed a reserve/future contract with the Chargers on January 11, 2022.

On August 30, 2022, Christiansen was waived by the Chargers.

=== Kansas City Chiefs ===
On September 1, 2022, Christiansen was signed to the Kansas City Chiefs practice squad. On October 15, he was elevated to the active roster. Two days later, Christiansen recorded his first tackle with the team against the Buffalo Bills. Christiansen became a Super Bowl champion when the Chiefs defeated the Philadelphia Eagles in Super Bowl LVII. He signed a reserve/future contract with Kansas City on February 15, 2023.

On August 29, 2023, Christiansen was waived by the Chiefs and was subsequently re-signed to the practice squad. He was promoted to the active roster on January 17, 2024. Christiansen won his second straight Super Bowl championship when the Chiefs defeated the San Francisco 49ers in Super Bowl LVIII.

Christiansen re-signed with the Chiefs on March 11, 2024. The Chiefs withdrew Christiansen's exclusive rights tender on May 4, making a free agent, however he was later re-signed. He was waived by the Chiefs on August 27, and re-signed to the practice squad. Christiansen was promoted to the active roster on September 18.

On August 26, 2025, Christiansen was waived by the Chiefs and re-signed to the practice squad the next day. He was promoted to the active roster on December 25.

On August 30, 2026, Christiansen was released by the Chiefs; he was re-signed to the team's practice squad the next day. On November 18, he was released.
