= Elijah Riley =

American football player (born 1998)

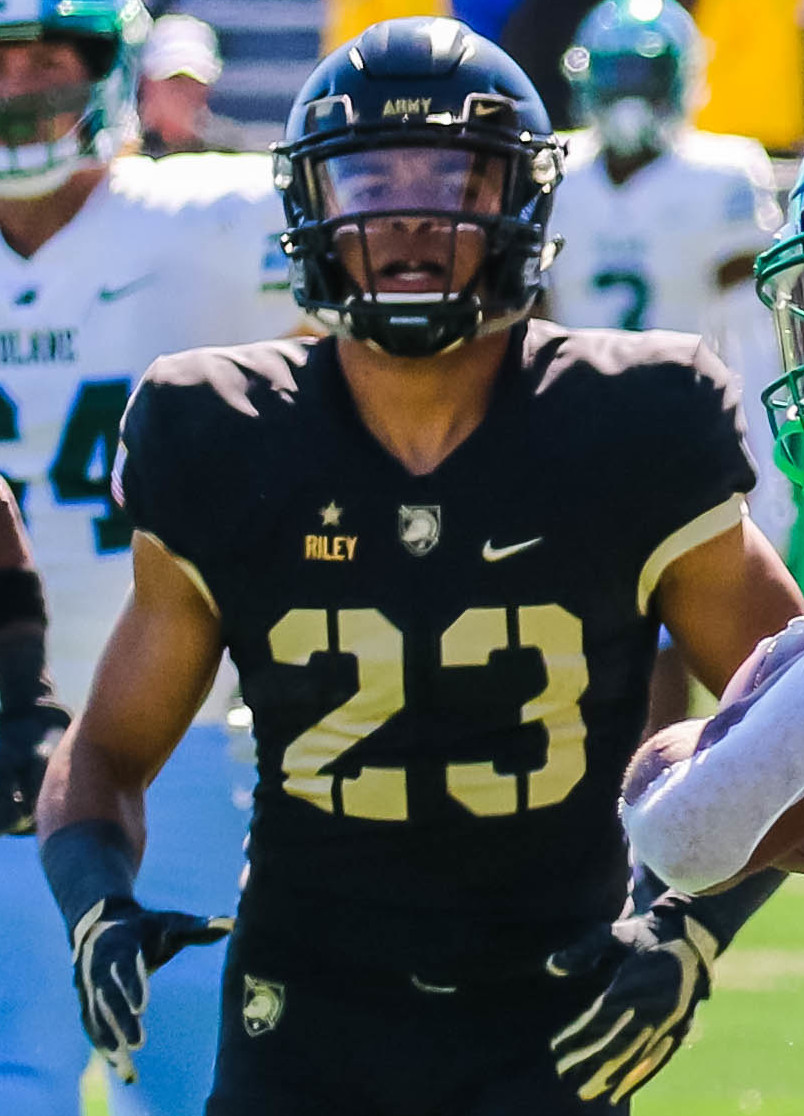
- Riley with the Army Black Knights in 2019

Profile
- Position: Safety

Personal information
- Born: June 12, 1998 (age 28); Port Jefferson, New York, U.S.
- Listed height: 6 ft 0 in (1.83 m)
- Listed weight: 205 lb (93 kg)

Career information
- High school: Newfield (NY)
- College: Army (2016–2019)
- NFL draft: 2020: undrafted

Career history
- Philadelphia Eagles (2020–2021); New York Jets (2021); Pittsburgh Steelers (2022–2023); New York Giants (2024)

Career NFL statistics as of 2024
- Tackles: 62
- Sacks: 2
- Pass deflections: 1
- Stats at Pro Football Reference

Elijah Riley (born June 12, 1998) is an American professional football safety. He was signed by the Philadelphia Eagles as an undrafted free agent in 2020 following his college football career for the Army Black Knights.

== Professional career ==
Pre-draft measurables
Height	Weight	Arm length	Hand span
5 ft 11 1/4 in (1.81 m)	209 lb (95 kg)	30 3/8 in (0.77 m)	9 5/8 in (0.24 m)
All values from Pro Day

=== Philadelphia Eagles ===
Riley signed with the Philadelphia Eagles as an undrafted free agent following the 2020 NFL draft on April 26, 2020. He was waived during final roster cuts on September 3, 2020, and re-signed to the team's practice squad three days later. He was elevated to the active roster on October 10 and 17 for the team's weeks 5 and 6 games against the Pittsburgh Steelers and Baltimore Ravens, and reverted to the practice squad following each game. On December 16, 2020, Riley was promoted to the active roster.

On August 31, 2021, Riley was waived by the Eagles and re-signed to the practice squad the next day.

=== New York Jets ===
On November 9, 2021, Riley was signed by the New York Jets off the Eagles practice squad making 7 starts. On August 23, 2022, he was released.

=== Pittsburgh Steelers ===
On August 24, 2022, Riley was claimed off waivers by the Steelers. He was waived on August 30 and signed to the practice squad the next day. He was elevated on October 8, 2022, to the active/inactive roster from the Steeler's practice squad, and then reverted to the practice squad after the game. He was promoted to the active roster on December 24, 2022.

On November 20, 2023, Riley was placed on injured reserve. He was activated on December 22.

=== New York Giants ===
On May 30, 2024, Riley signed with the New York Giants. He was placed on injured reserve on August 15.
