= Football strength =

Approach to athletic training

Football strength is a training regime, considered the most complex physical quality to be developed by an athlete. The training regime, exercises used, how the exercises are performed, and the types of equipment all play important roles in achieving desired results.

== The need for specificity ==
The role of strength preparation is highly valued in American football. However, it is usually performed for character development, rather than for the specific work of the intramuscular system required in football. The role of strength preparation is crucial not only for increasing muscular strength, which by itself provides an advantage, but also for developing the specific training effects of strength exercises. From the adaptation of the neuromuscular system, to the stress of high eccentric and explosive demands required in football, more specific and intense exercises are needed over of the general exercises commonly used to produce football strength, such as jump training and Olympic-style lifts.

If strength exercises are not used effectively, there will be a disparity between the functional levels of the skeletal muscle system and the capabilities of the neuromuscular system. Specialized strength work produces a strong training effect on the intramuscular system.

Specialized exercises are used to develop the physical and psychological qualities that apply directly to football. For example, using his hip flexors, a player can pull his leg from behind his body to underneath his hips forcefully, duplicating the knee drive action used in running and sprinting. By varying the repetitions and speed of execution, the exercises can either be explosive (high intensity), allow the athlete to develop muscular endurance, or fall somewhere in between, all predicated on what the football player is trying to improve.

Developing physical abilities specific to running, cutting, and jumping technique will have profound results in football-related strength and game performance. In addition, execution of certain specialized exercises requires concentration to develop the neuromuscular pathway needed. A strength exercise which duplicates a particular portion of a skill requires ultimate concentration and perseverance to repeat exactly the same movement time after time. This does not mean that general exercises are of no benefit. They play a very important role in the initial stages of improving a player’s performance. The general exercises precede the specialized exercises to develop a base upon which the special exercises can be performed most effectively. All the advantages of specialized strength work can be realized only with its effective organization.

== General vs. specialized exercises ==
An exercise does not have the same effect, nor does it improve sports performance to the same degree for athletes at different levels of development. The impact of an exercise depends on whether or not it has a direct effect on the sport's required skills. For example: running is directly related to football, so running exercise has a very good impact on football skill development.

General strength exercises are those exercises that are used in overall body conditioning. They are not directly related to the specific actions required by the sports, or football skill. The overhead press exercise for running can be used to illustrate this concept. It is a common exercise in which the arms move sideways directly upward from the shoulders. In running, however, the arms move in a forward-backward motion in relation to the trunk. Thus, while the overhead press is a good exercise for strengthening the shoulders and arms, which are used in running, it does not duplicate the arm and shoulder movements in the exact actions used in running and, thus, does little to improve that sports skill. General exercises, however, serve as a base upon which a player can add specialized exercises.

=== General exercises ===
General exercises play a very important role in the initial stages of improving a player’s performance. They precede the specialized exercises to develop a base upon which the specialized exercises can be performed most effectively.

=== Specialized exercises ===
When the movement pattern in the exercise duplicates what occurs during a run (or other sports skill), it is known as a specialized exercise. For a runner, an example of a specialized exercise for the shoulders and arms is driving the arm from behind the body to the front of the body in the same pathway and in the same range of motion as in the running stride.

Specialized strength exercises are designed and selected so that their movements and actions most closely match those required for the execution of the sport's specific skills. They also promote psychological traits such as decisiveness, willpower, perseverance and confidence to achieve specific goals. They require similar concentration and psychological qualities as those required for competition on the football field. For example, execution of certain specialized exercises requires concentration to develop the neuromuscular pathways needed. Any strength exercise that duplicates one aspect of a skill requires ultimate concentration and perseverance to repeat exactly the same movement time after time to develop the necessary muscle feel and activate the neuromuscular pathways. For the specialized exercises to have maximum positive transfer, the athlete must be decisive in his or her movements and actions to develop the confidence to repeat the action during play.

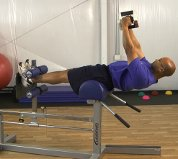
Football strength training

== Types of equipment ==
Free weights are recommended over machine weights for almost all athletes. When one uses free weights (barbells, dumbbells, medicine balls, rubber tubing, etc.), the resistance can be moved in a manner more suited to the sports skill’s intramuscular pattern. With free weights, the athlete must guide and control the movement throughout the execution. In the process, balance and stability are developed because the entire body participates in every exercise, especially when relatively heavy weights are used.

When the "marshmallow" machine weights are used, one must do what the machine dictates. The athlete is guided by the machine, rather than by what the body or limbs are intended to do. The machine isolates specific muscles and helps make them stronger, but that muscle hypertrophy will not necessarily be practical for any particular sport. Therefore, machine exercises are useful for general conditioning purposes, not specificity.

Medicine balls are used in many different exercises to develop muscular strength and endurance, total body power, and flexibility, but their greatest value lies in explosive midsection and arm training. The sudden forces experienced upon catching a weighted ball also imitate what occurs during play in football when contact is made with another player.

Rubber tubing (as opposed to dumbbells, barbells, or exercise machines) allows the athlete to duplicate movement patterns seen in the execution of football skills. With rubber tubing, the athlete can create resistance in any and all directions so that replication of the sports skill movement pattern is possible. The rubber tubing must have specific tensions and accessories so it can be attached to different parts of the body, as well as to different objects on the field, in the gym or at home.
