= Central Street =

Central Street may refer to:

== United States ==
- Central Street (Evanston, Illinois)
  - Central station (CTA Purple Line)
  - Central Street/Evanston station
- Central Street District, Andover, Massachusetts
- Central Street Historic District (Millville, Massachusetts)
- Central Street Historic District (Narragansett, Rhode Island)

== Other countries ==
- Central Street (Harbin, China)
- Central Street (Helsinki, Finland)
- Central Street (Taiwan)
