= Central Street Historic District =

Central Street Historic District may refer to:

- Central Street District, Andover, Massachusetts, listed on the NRHP in Massachusetts
- Central Street Historic District (Millville, Massachusetts), listed on the NRHP in Massachusetts
- Central Street Historic District (Narragansett, Rhode Island), listed on the NRHP in Rhode Island
