= Wilmette station =

Commuter rail station in Wilmette, Illinois

Wilmette

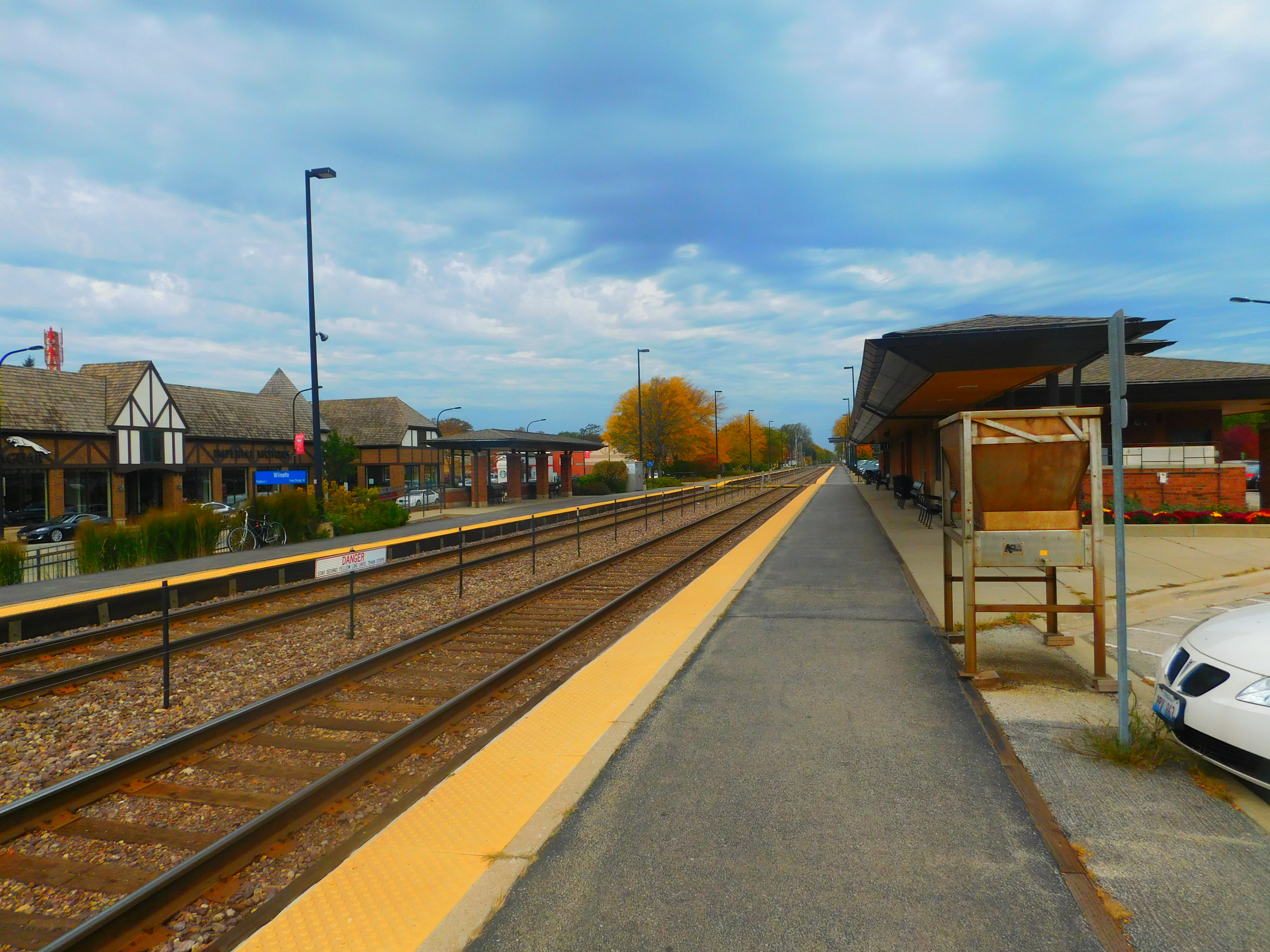

General information
- Location: 722 Green Bay Road; Wilmette, Illinois 60091
- Coordinates: 42.0773°N 87.7092°W
- Owner: Village of Wilmette
- Platforms: 2 side platforms
- Tracks: 2
- Connections: Pace Buses; Green Bay Bike Trail

Construction
- Accessible: Yes

Other information
- Fare zone: 2

History
- Opened: 1871
- Rebuilt: 2001

Passengers
- October 2025: 1,360 (average weekday)
- Rank: 8 out of 236

Services
Preceding station	Metra	Following station
Kenilworth toward Kenosha	Union Pacific North	Central Street/Evanston toward Ogilvie TC
Track layout
Location

Wilmette is a commuter railroad station in Wilmette, Illinois that is served by Metra's Union Pacific North Line. Trains go south to Ogilvie Transportation Center and as far north as Kenosha, Wisconsin. Travel time to Ogilvie is 31 minutes on local trains, and as little as 27 minutes on morning inbound trains and 22 minutes on one afternoon inbound train. In Metra's zone-based fare system, Wilmette is in zone 2. As of October 2025, Wilmette was the 18th busiest of Metra's 236 non-downtown stations, with an average of 1,653 weekday boardings.

The station is located at Green Bay Road and Washington Avenue in Wilmette's central business district. It is also in close proximity to the Wilmette Village Hall. Northbound trains stop on the west platform and southbound trains stop on the east platform. The closest CTA Purple Line station is Linden, about a mile away.

As of September 20, 2025, Wilmette is served by all 71 trains (35 inbound, 36 outbound) on weekdays, and by all 30 trains (15 in each direction) on weekends and holidays. During the summer concert season, an extra weekend train to Ravinia Park station also stops here.

== History ==
The first railroad station in Wilmette opened in 1871 at a cost of $700 (equivalent to $18,813 in 2025). In 1875, it took 30 minutes to get to Chicago (about the same as now), and the fare was 11 cents (adult one-way tickets cost $3.05 in 2006) and $5.50 as of February 2018. The former station has been on the National Register of Historic Places since 1975.

The present Metra station in Wilmette opened in 2001.

== Bus connections ==
Pace

- 213 Green Bay Road (Monday-Saturday only)
- 421 Wilmette Avenue (weekday rush hours only)
- 422 Linden CTA/Glenview/Northbrook Court (weekdays only)
