= Welsh–Ryan Arena =

Basketball venue of Northwestern University in Evanston, Illinois

- The Shrine; The Litter Box; The House that Boo Built
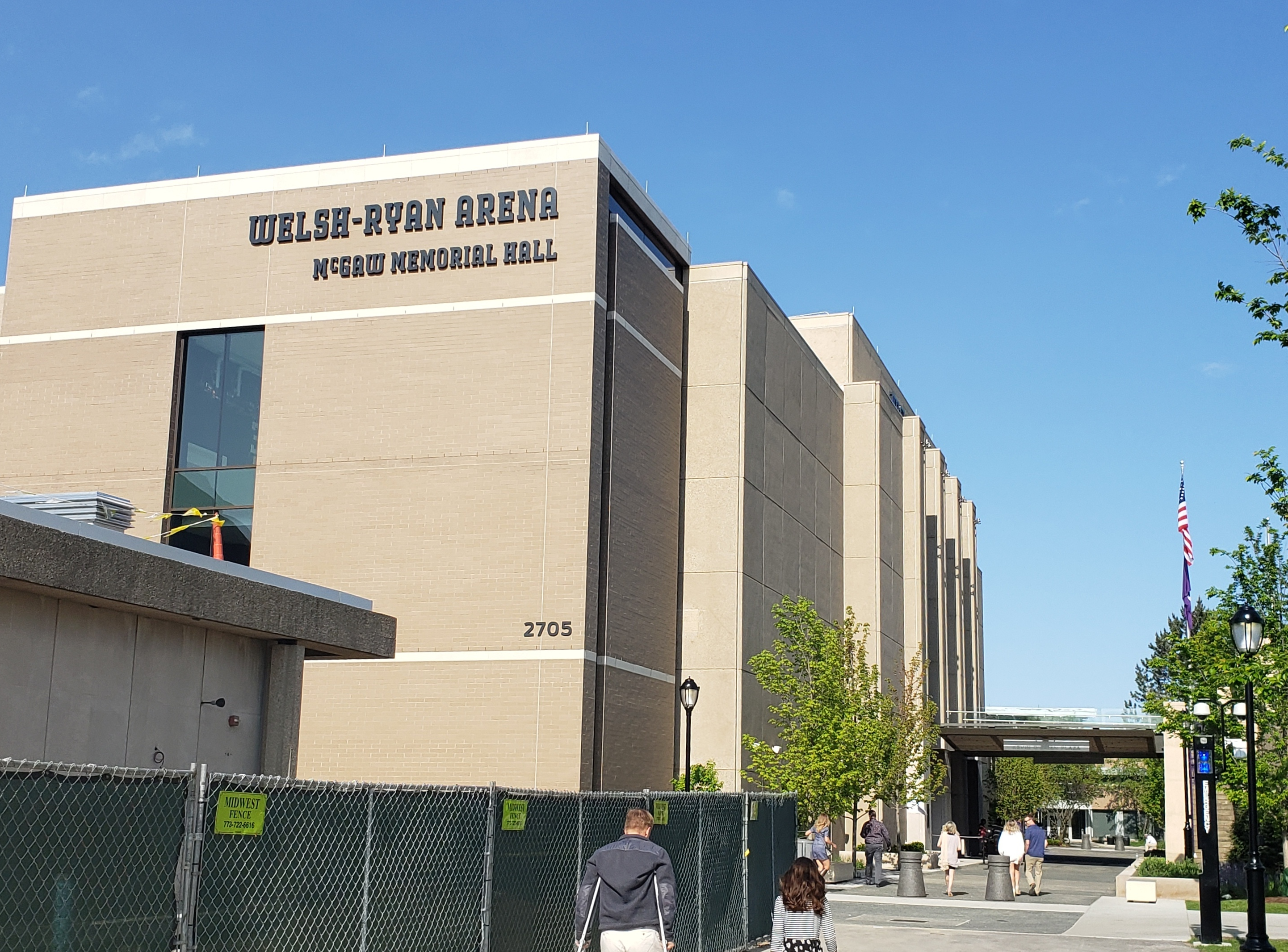
- Welsh–Ryan Arena in 2019
- Interactive map of Welsh–Ryan Arena
- Former names: McGaw Memorial Hall (1952–1983)
- Location: 2705 Ashland Avenue, Evanston, Illinois 60201, U.S.
- Coordinates: 42°4′1″N 87°41′34″W
- Owner: Northwestern University
- Operator: Northwestern University
- Capacity: 7,039 (2018–present); 8,117 (1983–2017); 7,070 (1981–1983); 7,013 (1973–1981); 8,800 (1960–1973); 9,500 (1952–1960)
- Surface: Hardwood

Construction
- Groundbreaking: May 1, 1951
- Opened: December 6, 1952
- Renovated: 1983, 2017–2018
- Cost: $1.25 million ($15.2 million in 2025 dollars)
- Architect: Holabird & Root & Burgee
- General contractor: R.C. Weiboldt Construction Company

Tenants
- Northwestern Wildcats (NCAA); Men's basketball (1952–present); Women's basketball (1975–present); Volleyball (1976–present); Wrestling (1952–present)

Welsh–Ryan Arena is a multi-purpose arena in Evanston, Illinois, United States, near the campus of Northwestern University. It is home to four Northwestern Wildcats athletic teams: men's basketball, women's basketball, volleyball, and wrestling. It is located inside McGaw Memorial Hall, to the north of the site of Ryan Field.

The building opened in 1952 as a replacement for Patten Gymnasium, and was the site of the Final Four for the 1956 NCAA Division I men's basketball tournament. It was extensively renovated in 1983, at which time the main arena was renamed Welsh–Ryan Arena. After the 2016–17 basketball season, the arena was renovated and upgraded as part of a $110 million project completed in late 2018. The renovation displaced the athletic programs that use the arena for the 2017–18 season.

For years, Welsh–Ryan Arena was the smallest arena in the Big Ten Conference and the only conference facility that did not seat at least 10,000. With Rutgers University joining the conference in 2014, Welsh–Ryan became the second-smallest arena after the Louis Brown Athletic Center at Rutgers, which has a listed capacity of 8,000. After its renovation, Welsh–Ryan once again became the smallest arena in the Big Ten Conference in 2018, with the listed capacity decreasing to 7,039 after renovations.

== History ==
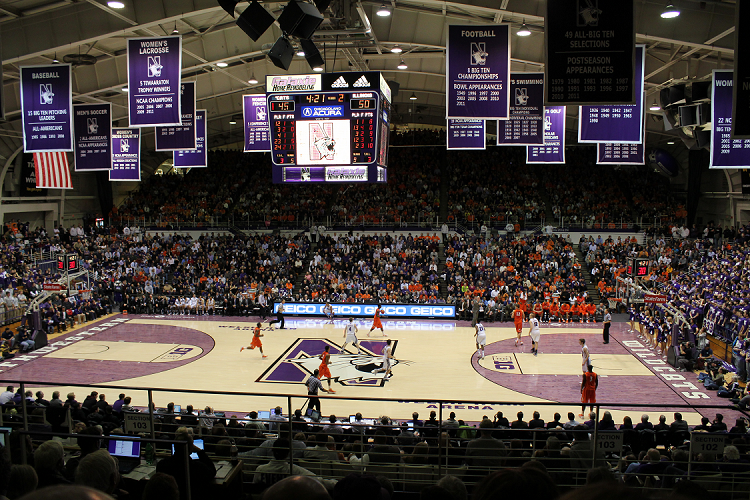
2012 men's basketball game at the arena

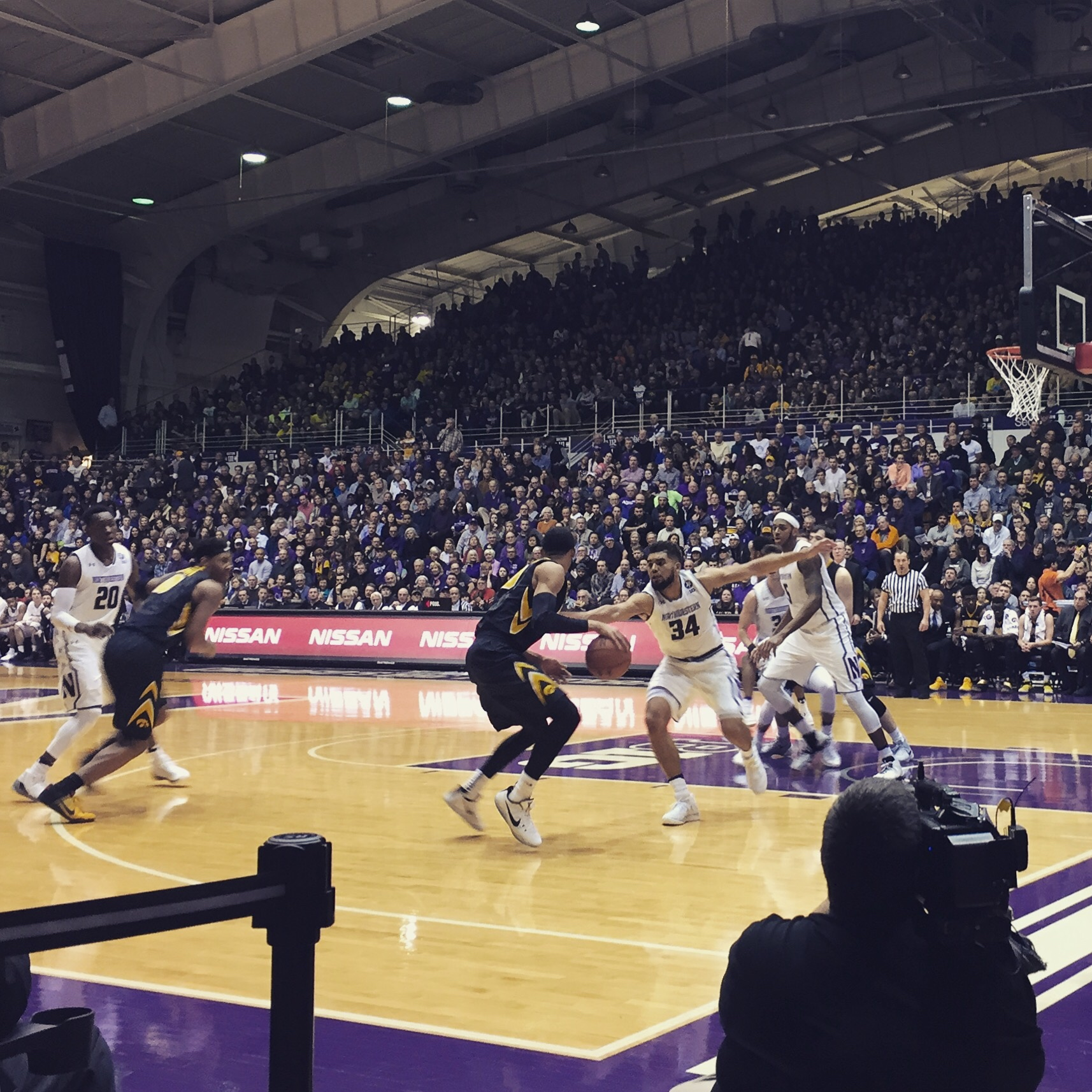
2017 men's basketball game at the arena

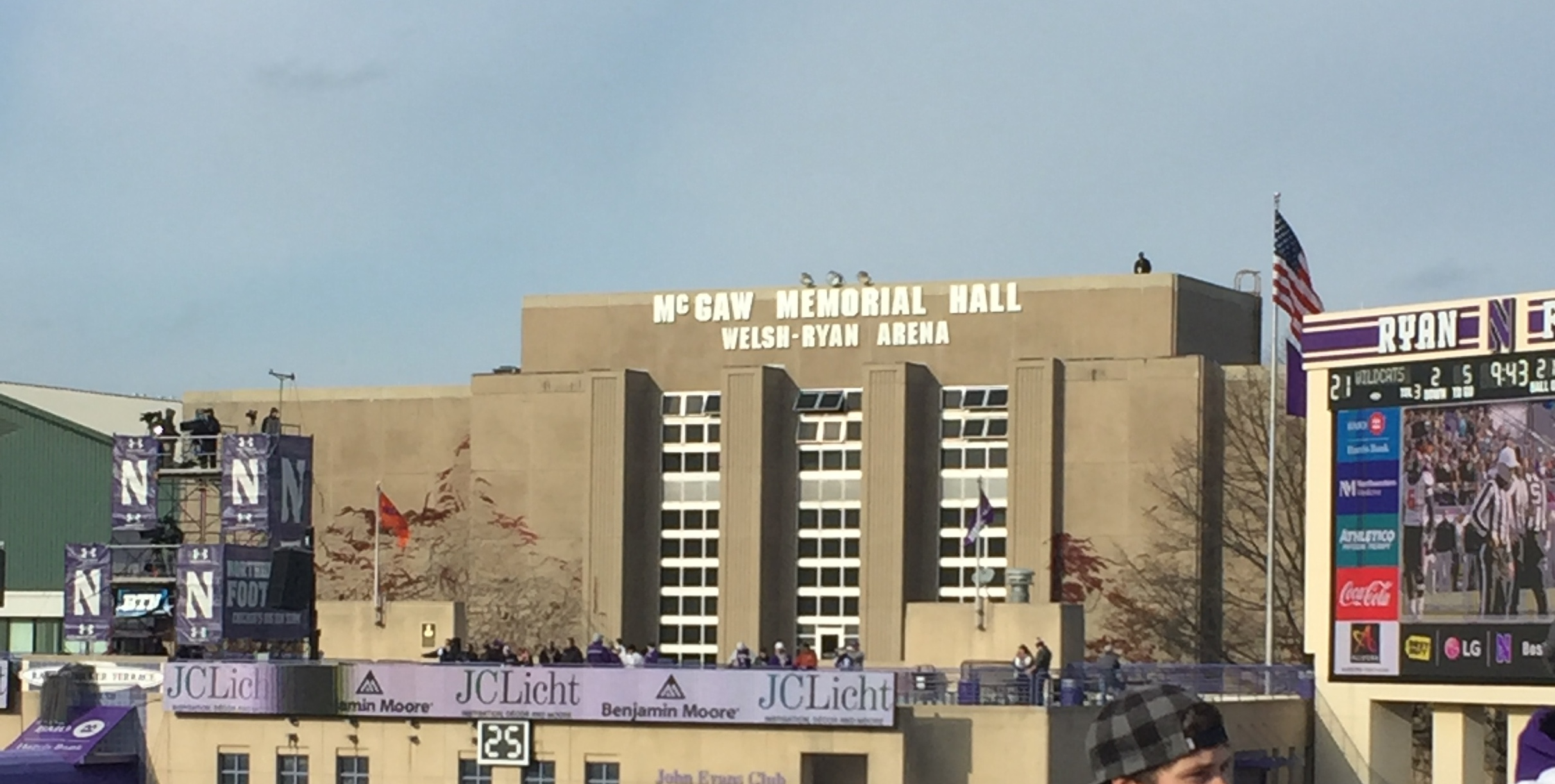
Exterior, viewed from the original Ryan Field stadium in 2016

McGaw Memorial Hall was built through the generosity of Northwestern University trustee and donor Foster G. McGaw, founder of the American Hospital Supply Corporation. The building, named in memory of McGaw's father, Presbyterian minister and missionary Francis A. McGaw, to house sporting events and large-scale meetings. With a seating capacity of about 13,000, McGaw Memorial Hall was one of the three largest auditoriums in the Chicago area at the time of its construction. Designed by the architectural firm of Holabird & Root & Burgee and built of reinforced concrete, McGaw Memorial Hall contained 54,000 square feet (5,000 m^{2}) of interior space. The lighting system, consisting of 180 mercury vapor lights, was said to simulate "pure daylight."

Partitions, portable bleachers, and a removable basketball floor made the building suitable for a wide variety of uses. While the intent was to provide a space large enough to hold the entire student body of Northwestern University at once during convocations and other such campus occasions, the auditorium was also used by the North Shore Music Festival and, soon after its opening, by the Second Assembly of the World Council of Churches. This event, held August 15–30, 1954, featured a convocation address by U.S. President Dwight D. Eisenhower.

In 1983 Northwestern completed extensive renovations on the interior of the McGaw Hall. The main arena was renamed Welsh–Ryan Arena in honor of the project's principal donor, insurance magnate Patrick G. Ryan, president of the Board of Trustees, and of his wife's parents, Mr. and Mrs. Robert J. Welsh Sr. The lobby was renamed Ronald J. Chinnock Lobby after real estate tycoon Ronald Chinnock.

The McGaw Fieldhouse is a practice facility within the building, which in 1997 was renovated to allow practice space for basketball and volleyball.

In 2007, the Brown Family Basketball Center was constructed within the McGaw Fieldhouse to include new locker rooms and team lounges for the men's and women's basketball teams, as well as offices for their respective coaching staffs.

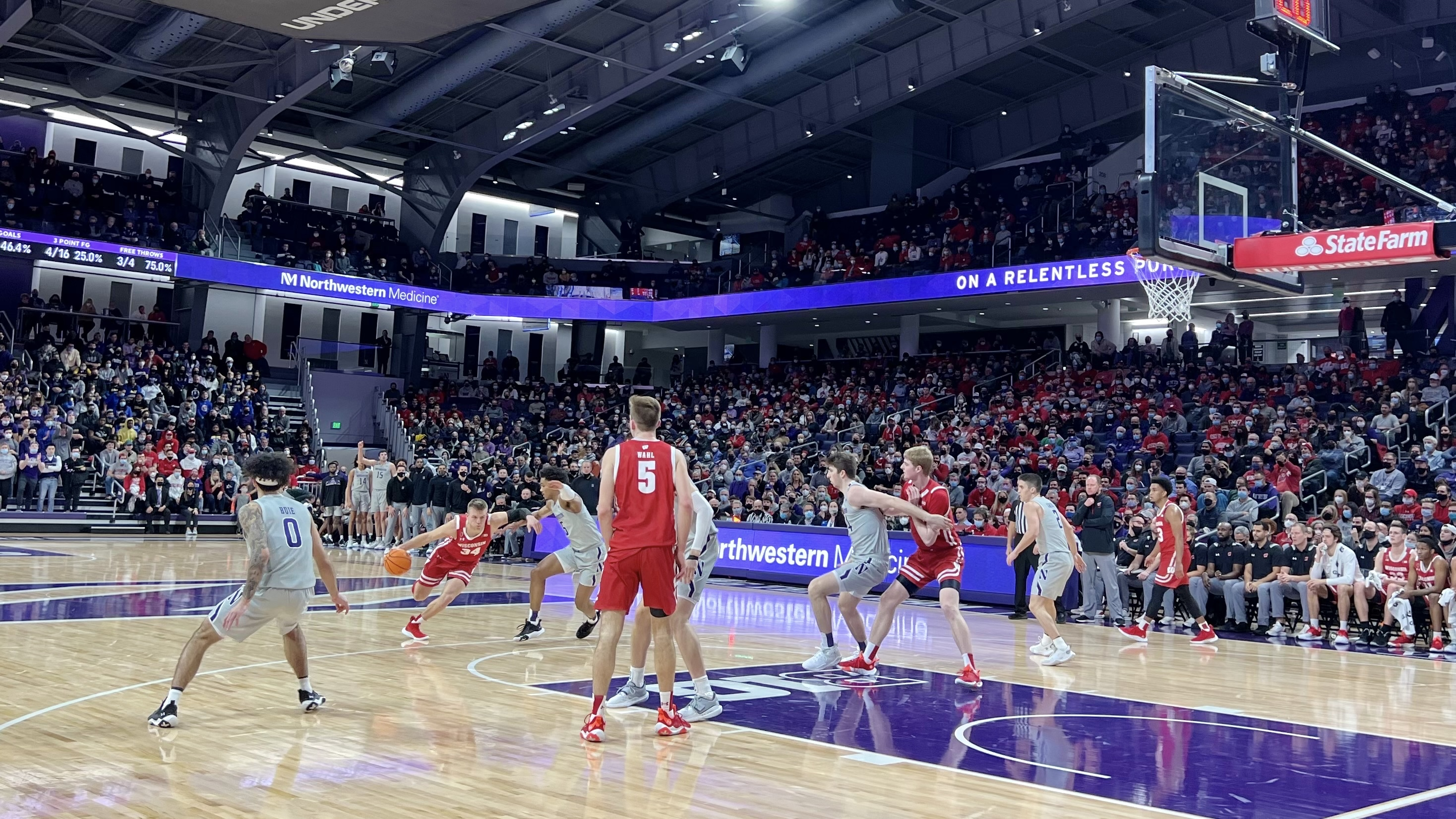
2022 men's basketball game at the arena

In 2016, Northwestern announced plans for a $110 million arena renovation, shuttering the facility for the 2017–18 season. During that time, the Wildcat men's basketball and wrestling teams played at Allstate Arena in Rosemont, with the women's basketball team playing out of Evanston Township High School's Beardsley Gym that season. Capacity was reduced to 7,039 by replacing the bleachers with chairback seats. The renovated facility also has wider concourses, balconies behind the baskets, and suites. Before then, one of the few significant changes since the 1983 renovation had been the replacement of the arena's 1980s-vintage scoreboards with a modern video board.

== See also ==
- List of NCAA Division I basketball arenas

Preceded by Municipal Auditorium	NCAA Men's Division I Basketball Tournament; Finals Venue; 1956	Succeeded by Municipal Auditorium
