= Central Street (Cook County) =

Road in Evanston, Illinois

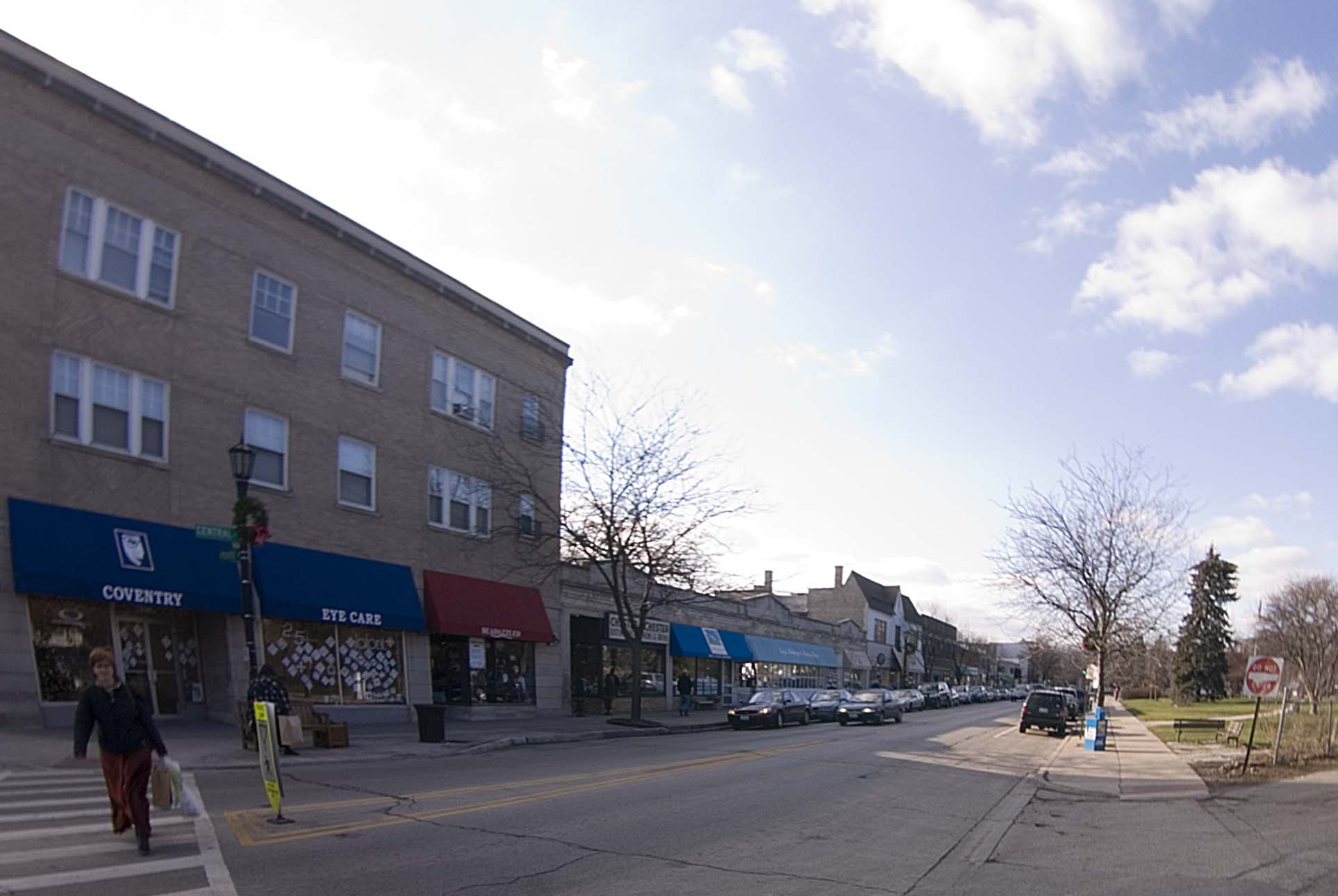
- Shops in Central Street
- Interactive map of Central Street
- Length: 17.9 mi (28.8 km)
- Coordinates: 42.0644°N 87.7049°W
- West end: Barrington Road, Hoffman Estates
- East end: Sheridan Road, Evanston (1800 W)

Central Street is the principal east-west artery in the far north of Evanston, Illinois and is a major thoroughfare in other northern and northwest suburbs of Chicago. It is the longest east-west road in the city of Evanston, where it stretches for over two miles (3 km) from the city limits west of Crawford Avenue to its eastern intersection with Sheridan Road near the historic Grosse Point Lighthouse. West of Evanston, the street begins in Glenview and runs westward intermittently through various municipalities, where it is alternately known as Central Road, Central Parkway, and Central Street. The street is located at 2600 N in the Evanston grid system and 10100 N in the Chicago grid system.

== History and name ==
Central Street has a non-central location in Evanston; the name dates to when the street was the principal thoroughfare for the village of North Evanston, which was annexed to Evanston in 1874.

== Transportation ==
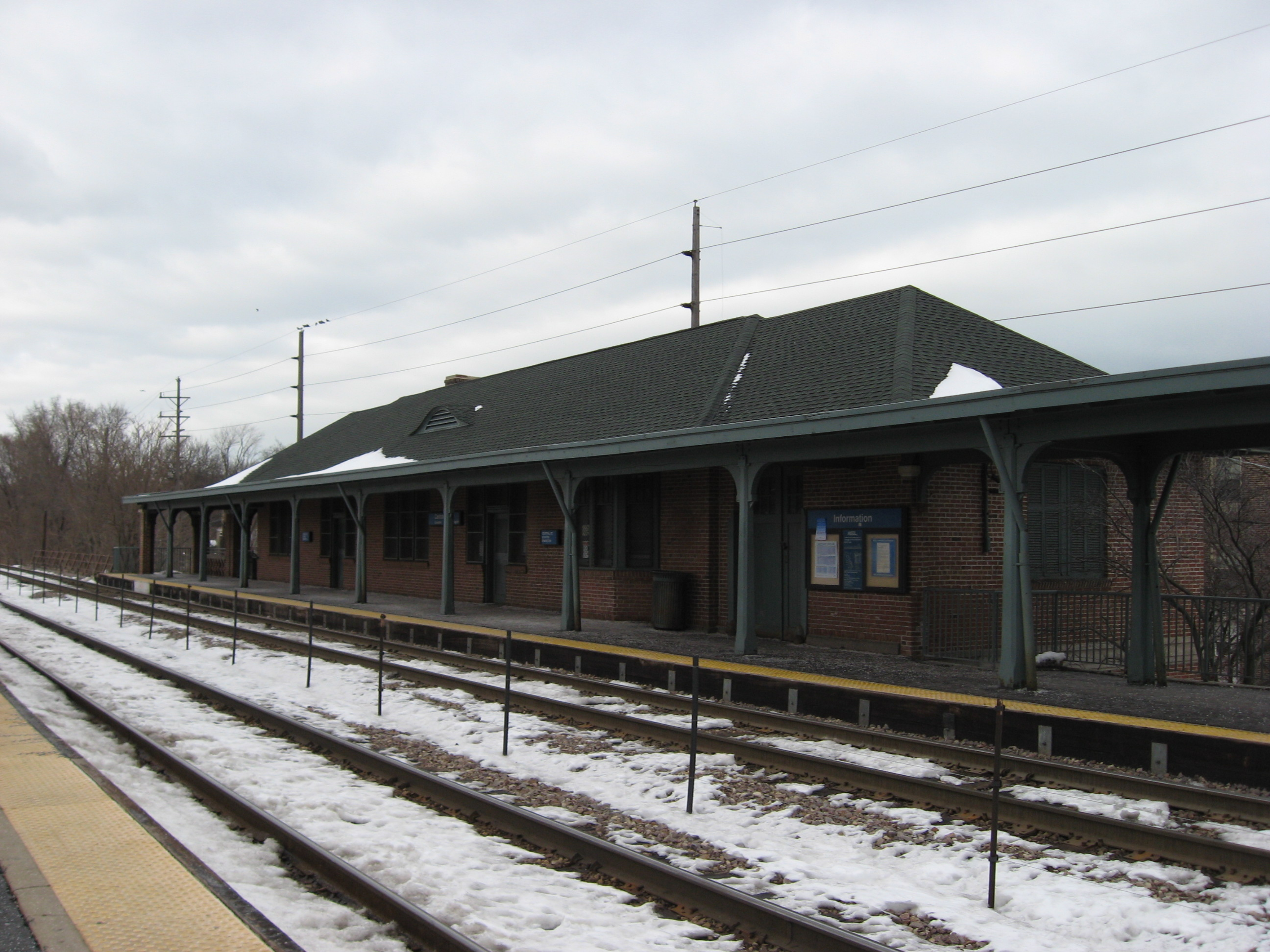
Metra station

Central Street has been extensively served by mass transit for over a century. The Chicago & Milwaukee Railroad began service from Chicago to Waukegan in 1855. The Chicago and North Western Railway took over the line in 1866, and the Central Street station (at Green Bay Road) still stands today as a Metra stop on the Union Pacific North Line.

An Evanston trolley system operated electric streetcars down Central Street from 1897 to 1935. Light rail service connecting the neighborhood with Chicago reached Central Street in 1908, when the right-of-way of the Chicago, Milwaukee, and St. Paul Railroad, a would-be competitor of the CN&W, on tracks a half-mile east, was leased to a trolley company. Today the north-south line is operated by the CTA, which maintains a Central Street stop on the Purple Line. In rush hours there is express service to the Loop.

Four different bus routes serve the neighborhood, with two running directly down Central Street itself.

Central Street is classified by the Illinois Department of Transportation as an unmarked state-maintained road. The street is wide enough in portions for four lanes and contains sections that are part of Evanston's bicycle plan. The community takes an active interest in bicycling as transportation, including as part of multi-modal transportation. Sections of Central Street were striped in 2010 for dedicated bike lanes.

Evanston's 2000 Comprehensive General Plan identified the Central Street "corridor" as a location for increased residential density because of the mass transit availability, but noted that "sensitivity to the surrounding neighborhoods" would be essential to prevent over-congestion and incompatible design; the same study identified Central Street as an area where there was already a significant shortage of parking.

== Business ==
The Central Street district is frequently referred to as "unique," even in Evanston city code, which refers to "diverse, unique, small-scale, pedestrian-oriented retail shops, services and restaurants." Regional publications, the real estate industry, and travel publications take note of the "specialty shops and restaurants" that exist in a walkable environment with an eclectic, vintage "small-town feel."

The shopping district is a destination that draws customers from outside the area; a 2005 study done for the Village of Wilmette identified the "core" of Central Street (identified as the shopping area around the intersection of Central Street and Green Bay Road) as a direct competitor of the Green Bay Road Corridor in Wilmette, that "attracts many residents from southeast Wilmette for basic shopping." The local merchants have their own association and a Facebook page that lists many businesses.

== Culture and art ==
The Central Street district includes a number of art galleries and antique stores. It is home to the Mitchell Museum of the American Indian and the Evanston Art Center. Since 1952 the North Branch of the Evanston library system has been located on Central Street. A large and active community organization, the Central Street Neighbors Association, maintains an interactive website with neighborhood and cultural news.

== Development and zoning issues ==
=== Canyonization ===
In 2004, the potential overdevelopment of Central Street became an issue after the construction of several new multi-use, multi-story buildings up to the limit of the lot line, larger in scale than the vast majority that housed existing businesses. Residents generally opposed the potential "canyonization" of the street. Canyonization of the street became an issue in the 2005 municipal election. After a year of activism by residents and numerous municipal and ward meetings, the City of Evanston in November 2005, amended its zoning ordinance to create a new "B1a" district, extending for several blocks on the western portion of Central Street, "characterized by having reduced building height and residential density."

=== Evanston Theatre redevelopment ===
In 2006 a development team requested a site development allowance and special use permit from the City Council in order to demolish a structure on the 1700 block of Central, east of Green Bay road, housing the shuttered Evanston Theatre, a restaurant, and a number of storefronts, to make way for a 5-story, 51-unit mixed-use condominium development. After the developers modified the proposal to four stories, with upper floors stepped back slightly from the street, the Council approved the project in February 2007, over neighbors' objections.

=== Central Street Master Plan ===
In response to some of the previous controversies, the City of Evanston in the winter of 2006–07 began a long-urged comprehensive planning of Central Street. A Master Plan was adopted in June 2007, and ordinances passed in January 2008 that re-zoned the corridor, including the first steps toward form-based code in Evanston.

== Fourth of July parade ==
Central Street serves as the route for the Evanston Fourth of July parade. The Evanston Fourth of July Association, a 501(c)3 not-for-profit, has held the parade since 1922. The celebration was started by the North End Mothers' Club in response to a child being injured by firecrackers the previous year. The parade attracts about 15,000 spectators each year, and Country Home magazine ranked it as the third-best Fourth of July celebration in 2003, after Washington, DC and Boston. The parade became a subject of local controversy in the early 2000s due to attendees who put chairs, tape, and other markers along the route weeks ahead of time. Central Street residents became irritated at the chairs, and many complained to the city government about the issue. The city responded by passing an ordinance which prohibited residents from placing chairs and blankets along the parade route prior to July 1; city workers remove any items (chairs etc.) placed earlier. The ordinance also outlawed the use of rope or tape to reserve a spot.

== Major intersections ==
The entire route is in Cook County.

Location	mi	km	Destinations	Notes
Hoffman Estates	0.0	0.0	Barrington Road	Western terminus
Hoffman Estates	3.1	5.0	I-90 Toll west – Rockford	I-90 exit 65; westbound entrance only; no exit
Schaumburg	3.5	5.6	Roselle Road to I-90 Toll east – Chicago	Eastern terminus of western section
Gap in route
Rolling Meadows	3.5	5.6	Frontage Road	Western terminus of central section
Mount Prospect	7.8	12.6	US 14 (Northwest Highway)	
Mount Prospect	8.1	13.0	IL 83 (Main Street)	
Mount Prospect	9.0	14.5	US 12 (Rand Road)	
Des Plaines	11.5	18.5	US 45 (Des Plaines River Road) – Palwaukee Airport	
Glenview	12.7	20.4	IL 21 (Milwaukee Avenue)	
Glenview	15.1	24.3	Lehigh Avenue	Eastern terminus of central section
Gap in route
Evanston	15.1	24.3	Greeley Avenue	Western terminus of eastern section
Evanston	17.9	28.8	Sheridan Road	Eastern terminus
1.000 mi = 1.609 km; 1.000 km = 0.621 mi: Incomplete access
