= Main Street Historic District (Millville, Massachusetts) =

Historic district in Massachusetts, United States

- U.S. National Register of Historic Places
- U.S. Historic district
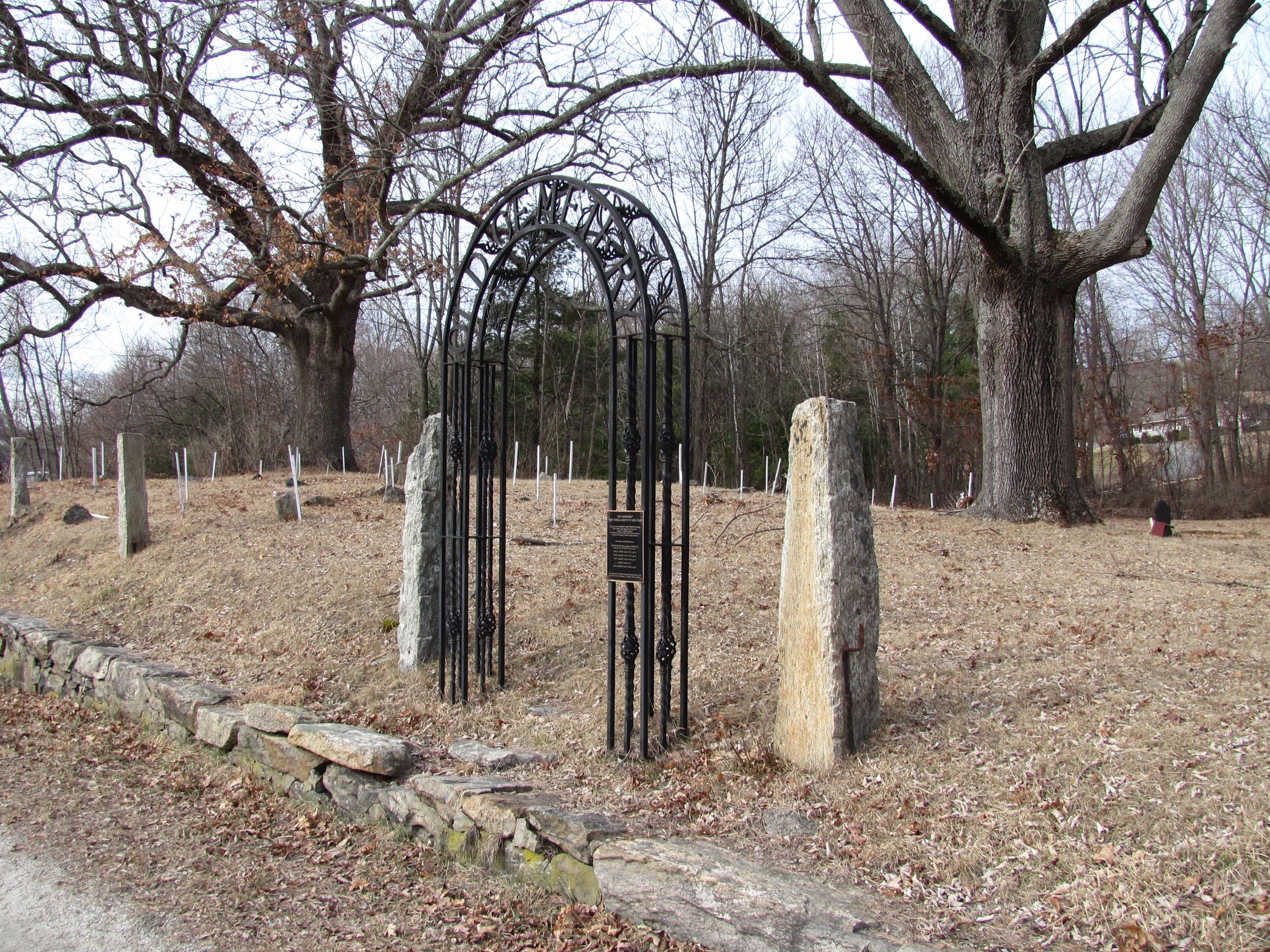
- Old Cemetery

- Location within Massachusetts Location within the United States
- Location: Millville, Massachusetts
- Coordinates: 42°1′40″N 71°34′44″W
- Area: 85 acres (34 ha)
- Architectural style: Federal, Greek Revival
- NRHP reference No.: 06000360
- Added to NRHP: May 10, 2006

The Main Street Historic District is a historic district encompassing a portion of the 19th century industrial village center of Millville, Massachusetts. This district covers a large portion of the village, along Main Street south of Central Street, and along Lincoln Street and Chestnut Hill Road radiating away from Central Street. Other historical portions of the village are contained within the Central Street Historic District. This district was listed on the National Register of Historic Places in 2006.

== See also ==
- National Register of Historic Places listings in Worcester County, Massachusetts
