= Central Street/Evanston station =

Commuter rail station in Evanston, Illinois

Coordinates: 42.063964°N 87.698041°W

Central Street Evanston

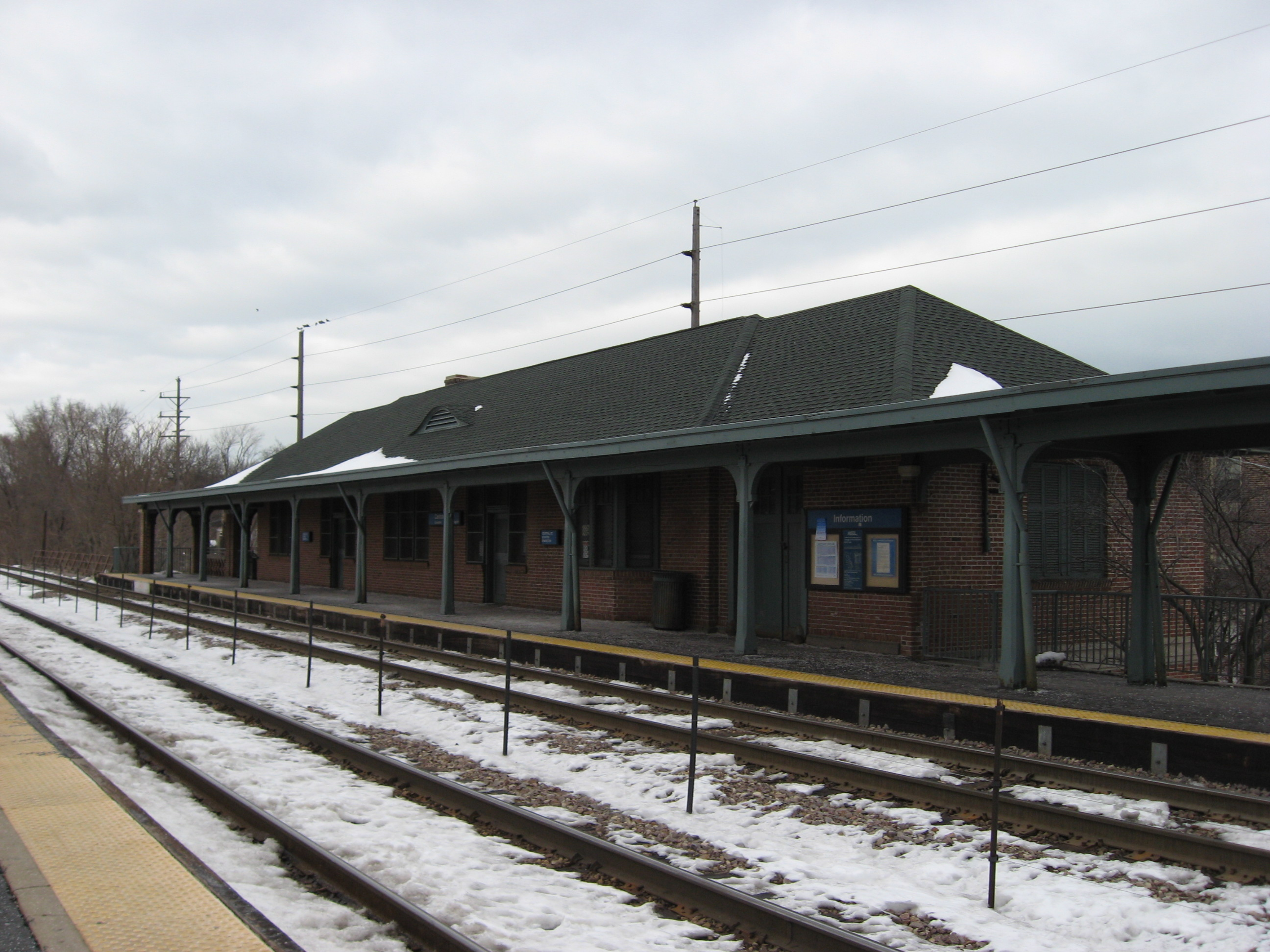

General information
- Location: 1826 Central Street; Evanston, Illinois 60201
- Owner: Union Pacific
- Platforms: 2 side platforms
- Tracks: 2
- Connections: CTA and Pace Buses

Construction
- Accessible: Yes

Other information
- Fare zone: 2

History
- Opened: 1911

Passengers
- 2018: 1,346 (average weekday) ▼5.7%
- Rank: 27 out of 236

Services
Preceding station	Metra	Following station
Wilmette toward Kenosha	Union Pacific North	Davis Street/Evanston toward Ogilvie TC
Former services
Preceding station	Chicago and North Western Railway	Following station
Wilmette toward Milwaukee	Milwaukee Division	Evanston toward Chicago
Track layout
Location

Central Street/Evanston is the northernmost of the three commuter railroad stations in Evanston, Illinois. It is an elevated station at Green Bay Road and Central Street, surrounded by a neighborhood of stores, restaurants and multi-story apartment buildings. Just north of the station, the tracks descend to grade and pass through Wilmette on ground level.

Central Street station is served by Metra's Union Pacific North Line, with service south to Ogilvie Transportation Center in Chicago and as far north as Kenosha, Wisconsin. The station is 13.3 miles (21.4 km) from Ogilvie Transportation Center. In Metra's zone-based fare system, Central Street is in zone 2. As of 2018, Central Street is the 27th busiest of Metra's 236 non-downtown stations, with an average of 1,346 weekday boardings. There are two platforms: northbound trains stop at the west platform, and southbound trains stop at the east platform. Central Street has a station house on the east platform. The station house contains a ticket booth as well as a coffee and pastry shop named "Upstairs Cafe" owned and run by three Evanston women, two of whom are professional bakers. The station house is open from 5:15 a.m. to 1:15 p.m. and a ticket agent is present during these hours on weekdays.

As of September 20, 2025, Central Street is served by 59 trains (30 inbound, 29 outbound) on weekdays, and by all 30 trains (15 in each direction) on weekends and holidays. During the summer concert season, the extra weekend train to Ravinia Park station also stops here.

This is the closest Metra station to Northwestern University's sports complex at Ryan Field. The 15th hole fairway and 16th hole tee box of the Canal Shores Golf Course adjoin this Metra station. The Chicago Transit Authority's Central station on the Purple Line is less than a mile to the east, though a more direct connection can be made at the adjacent Evanston Davis Street station.

== Bus connections ==
CTA

- 201 Central/Ridge (Monday–Saturday only)
- 206 Evanston Circulator (weekday rush hours only)

Pace

- 213 Green Bay Road (Monday–Saturday only)
