= Evanston Public Library =

Public library of Evanston, Illinois

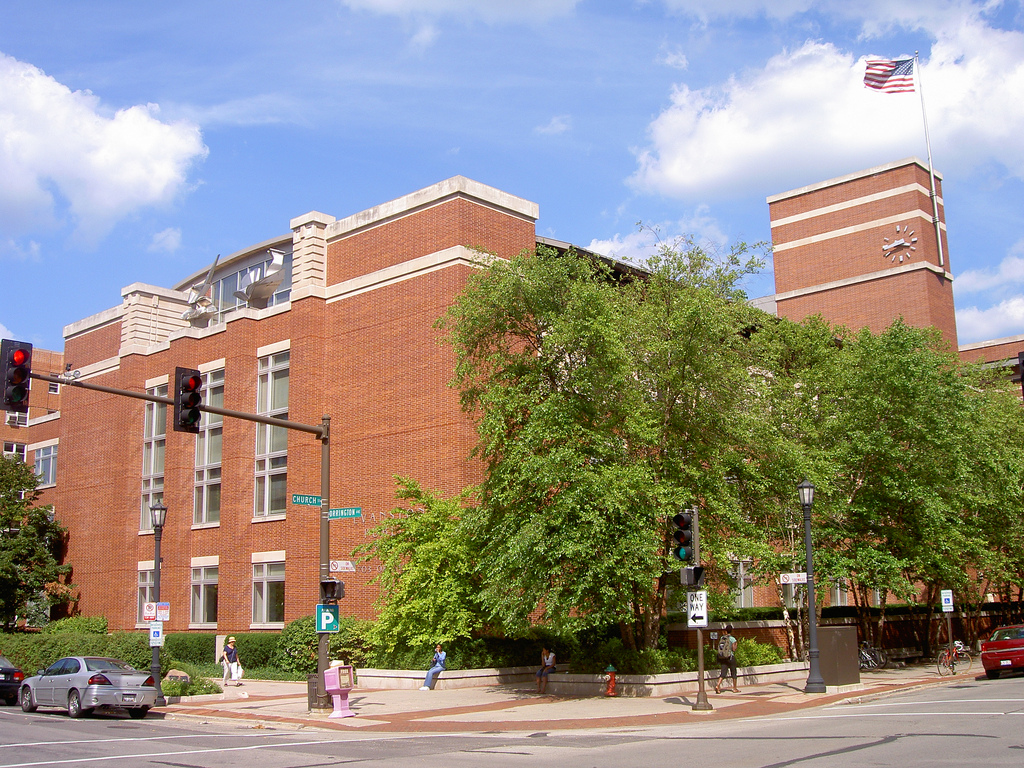
- Evanston Public Library, 2009
- 42°2′54.24″N 87°40′48.36″W
- Established: 1873; 153 years ago
- Branches: 2

Access and use
- Circulation: 979,000

Other information
- Website: https://www.epl.org

Evanston Public Library is both a public library facility and a city department in Evanston, Illinois, United States.

== History ==
The Evanston Library Association was founded in 1870. The library itself was established in 1873 and Thomas J. Kellan was appointed the library's first librarian in 1874. In 1893 the library moved to the second floor of the new Village Hall in 1893 and the library's collection was reorganized according to the new Dewey Decimal Classification system in 1896. In 1908 the library moved to its current location at 1703 Orrington Avenue.

Two additional branches were later added – the South Branch (at 900 Chicago Avenue) in 1917 and the North Branch (at 2026 Central Street) in 1952 and in 1958 the City Planning Commission approved a proposal for a new building at Church and Orrington.

In 1980, the library made online public access available to its patrons along with the introduction of two new rental options: the videocassette and duplicates of best selling books.

The library moved into its newly finished building in 1994 and the library celebrated its 150th anniversary in 2023.

== Branches ==
The Evanston Public Library has a Main Library, located at 1703 Orrington Avenue, and the Robert Crown Branch Library, located in the Robert Crown Community Center at 1801 Main Street. The Robert Crown Branch was opened in 2020 in response to an equity audit and plan that prioritized resourcing Evanston's historically underserved neighborhoods and reduced costs by co-locating in city-owned facilities.

Previous branches included the North, South, and West branches.

- The South Branch was closed in 2011, and reopened after public response in 2013. It was closed again in late 2020.
- The North Branch operated from 1952 to 2020.
- A West Branch Library served the residents of Evanston's majority Black Fifth Ward from 1971 to 1981.

In March 2011, the Mighty Twig volunteer-run library opened at 900 Chicago Avenue in Evanston, "as an experiment by Evanston Public Library Friends in response to the closing of the South Branch." Then, in August–September, 2012, the Evanston Public Library's Board voted to "begin formalizing relations with The Mighty Twig."

== Special features ==
=== Children's room ===
The children's section of the library offers a fun and interactive environment for kids of all ages. Also available for children are a number of kid-friendly programs and activities that the library has featured everyday, from storytime to art projects.

=== The Loft ===
In 2007 the Evanston Public Library opened the Teen Loft, a space dedicated specifically to teenage library users. The Loft offers a space for teenagers to study, read, or relax after a long day at school. Computers, WiFi, 3D Printers, and plenty of couches are available as well as private study rooms for those who need the quiet.

The Loft offers an array of programming aimed specifically at Teens with a special emphasis on STEM activities. The Loft also runs a successful Gender/Sexuality Alliance that encourages LGBTQIA+ community building, advocacy, and education. In addition to programming the staff at The Loft works closely with ETHS, District 65, Y.O.U., and many other community enrichment groups to help ensure the success of Evanston teens.

The Loft's design team won the biennial American Library Association/International Interior Design Association interior design award. The award honors libraries that demonstrate artistic creativity with their choice of design, aesthetics and overall client satisfaction.

=== Peregrine falcons ===
Peregrine falcons have chosen to nest atop a column on the library since 2004. On years when the falcons nest, any babies that successfully hatch are banded by the Field Museum. As of 2023, the current pair that has chosen the library are named Coach Kevin (from the Hilton Garden Inn in Chicago) and Teca (from Carmeuse Lime Plant in Gary, Indiana). The public can follow the falcons' many adventures on the FalconCam during the spring nesting season.

=== Classes and programs ===
The Evanston Public Library offers more than 1,000 programs a year for all ages, interests, and abilities. Programs range from one-on-one technology help to the popular Mission Impossible Book Club that tackles the collected works of significant authors over the course of a year. Like the library's collection, programming is designed to reflect the diversity of the community, and include bilingual storytimes, adult literacy programs, citywide challenges to attract BIPOC youth and girls into STEM fields, a children's storytime led by people with developmental disabilities from nearby Misericordia Home, plus book clubs, health and wellness programming, legal help, mini-courses with Northwestern University faculty, plant swaps and many, many more.

=== Collection ===
The library's collection contains more than a million volumes, including books, DVDs, CDs, downloadable eBooks, audiobooks and films, and a small Library of Things. The library uses CollectionHQ software to track and improve the diversity of the authors and stories represented in the collection.

In 2019, the library halted book sales. Those wishing to donate books to the library may do so through a green Better World Books donation bin on the side of the library, with a portion of proceeds benefitting the library.

=== Art on display ===
The library has a variety of different art forms all over the library. Prominently displayed occupying several stories of the entry is "Ghostwriter" – a suspended wire sculpture by Ralph Helmick and Stuart Schechter that can be seen from every floor of the library.
