= Ryan Field (2026) =

Stadium in Evanston, Illinois, U.S.

- New Ryan Field
- Ryan Field in late September 2026

- Location within the United States Location within Illinois
- Interactive map of Ryan Field
- Address: 1501 Central Street
- Location: Evanston, Illinois, U.S.
- Coordinates: 42°3′56″N 87°41′33″W
- Elevation: 580 feet (180 m) AMSL
- Owner: Northwestern University
- Operator: Northwestern University
- Capacity: 35,000
- Type: College football stadium
- Surface: FieldTurf
- Public transit: at Central Street/Evanston; Purple at Central

Construction
- Groundbreaking: January 29, 2024
- Opened: October 2, 2026; 34 days ago
- Cost: $875 million
- Architects: HNTB, Perkins&Will, Rockwell Group

Tenants
- Northwestern Wildcats football (NCAA) (2026–present)

Website
- NewRyanField.com

Ryan Field (Note: Also known as New Ryan Field to distinguish from its predecessor.) is a college football stadium in the central United States, located in Evanston, Illinois, a suburb north of Chicago. Opened in 2026, it is the home field of the Northwestern University Wildcats football team and was constructed on the site of the former stadium of the same name. With a seating capacity of 35,000, Ryan Field is the smallest football stadium in the Big Ten Conference.

== History ==
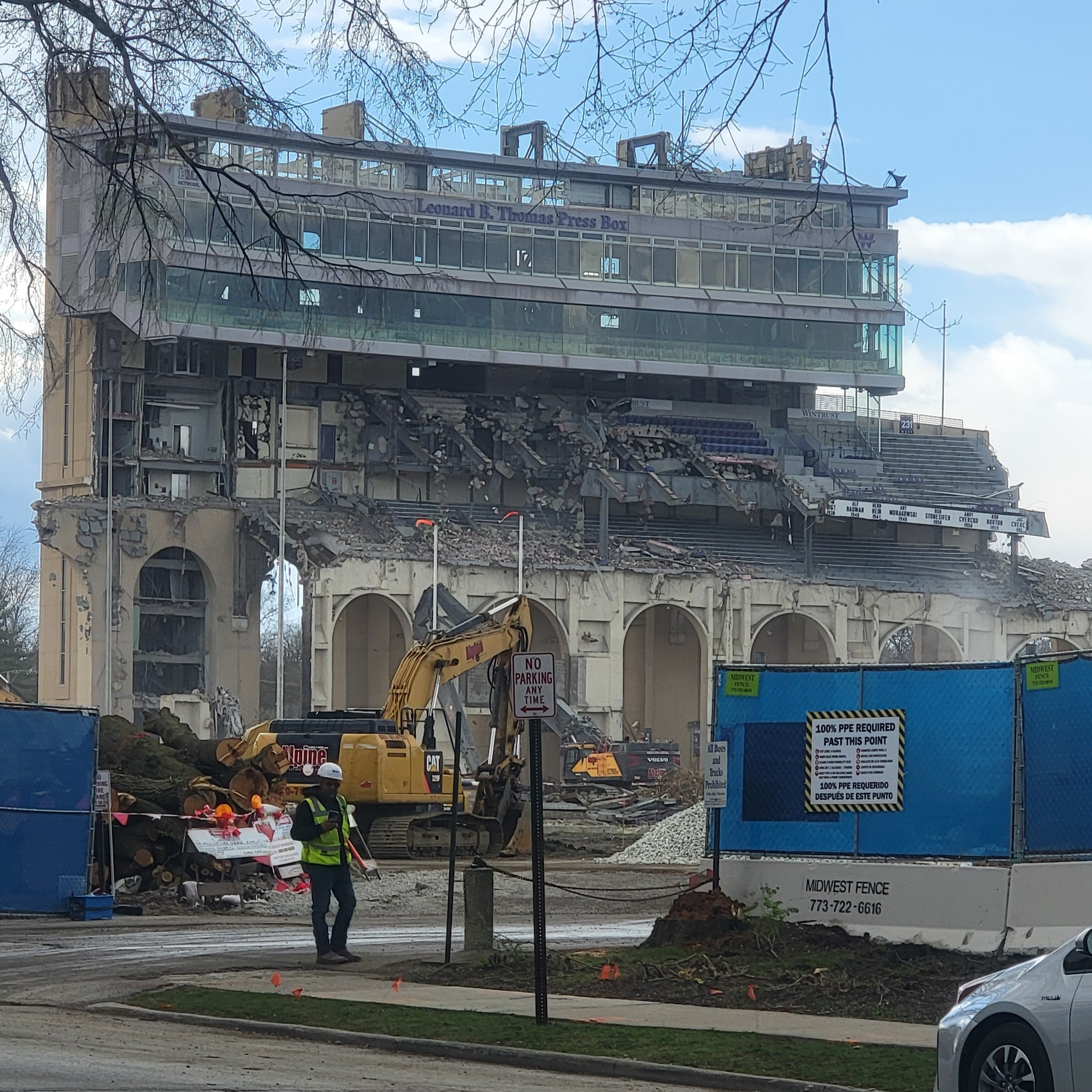
Ryan Field demolition in April 2024

On September 22, 2021, Northwestern announced that the Ryan family had donated $480 million to the university to replace Ryan Field with a new stadium at the existing site. A year later, Northwestern announced design concepts for the new stadium, and that the Ryan family had committed to additional funding above their initial stadium gift.

Northwestern touted the new venue as a "year-round community asset" for both the university and the city of Evanston, that in addition to football games would be the site of youth sports events, holiday festivals, student activities, and concerts. The university estimated it would bring a $1.3 billion economic impact to the Chicago area, including $659 million economic impact to Evanston.

Northwestern's plan to use the new stadium as a commercial concert venue was met with opposition from stadium neighbors and other Evanston residents. Issues included Northwestern's alleged failure to address potential noise, parking, traffic congestion, and public safety. Some have questioned the stadium's continued property tax exemption while being used for commercial purposes.

In November 2023, the Evanston City Council approved zoning changes to allow concerts to be held at the new stadium. After receiving approval, the university quickly proceeded with demolition of the existing stadium to avoid allowing time for any further legal challenges that could have delayed the project.

The preliminary cost was announced at $850 million, making it the most expensive college football stadium in the country. Led by the architecture firms HNTB and Perkins&Will, the stadium has a capacity of 35,000, a reduction of 12,000 from the previous facility and the smallest football stadium in the Big Ten Conference. The final budget was modestly increased to $862 million after the addition of a club area dedicated to younger Northwestern alumni.

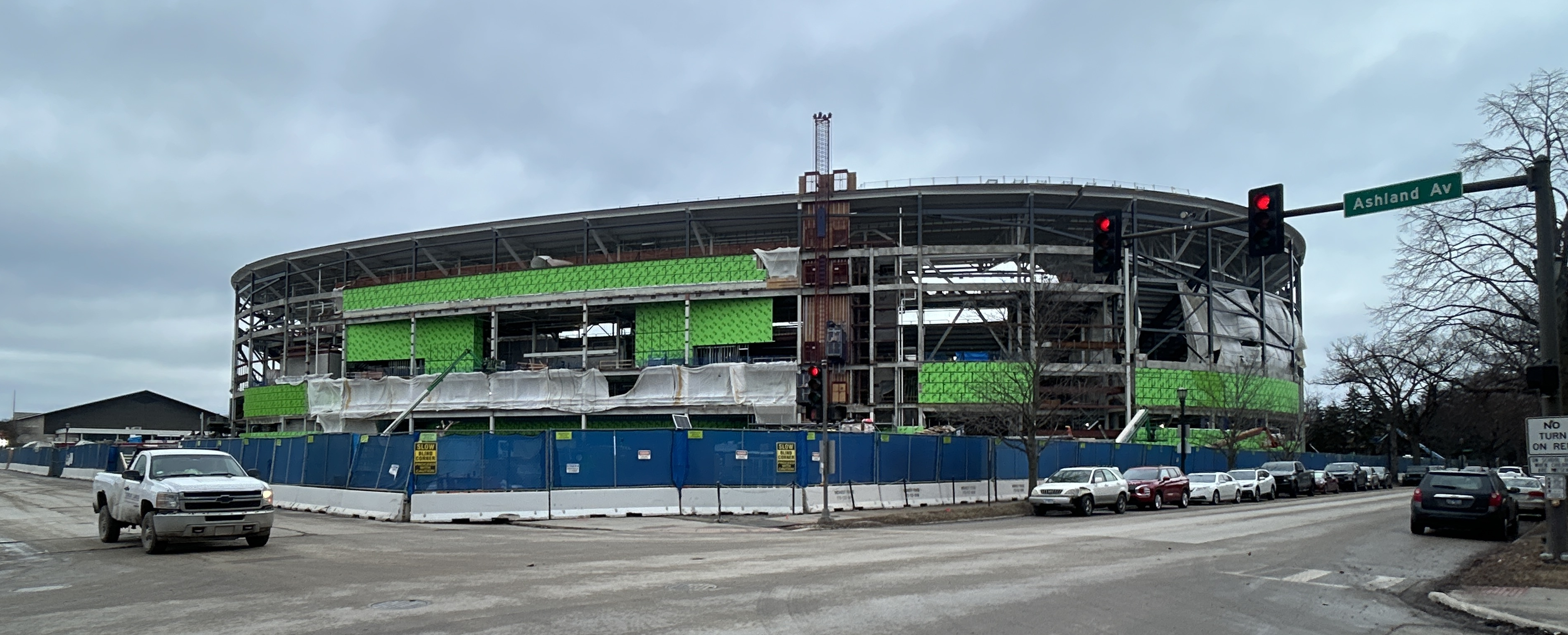
Ryan Field under construction in February 2026

On January 20, 2024, it was announced that a demolition process, without explosives, would begin on January 29. The demolition was expected to take 4 to 6 months, after confirmation that a new, $850 million stadium would replace the existing, aging one.

Over the two football seasons during which construction on the new stadium occurred, Northwestern football played the majority of their home games at Martin Stadium, a lakefront athletic facility on the university's primary Evanston campus. To accommodate football, temporary grandstands were added.

The new stadium had been expected to host its first football game on September 12, 2026, against the South Dakota State Jackrabbits. Due to construction delays, the opening was pushed back roughly three weeks to Friday, October 2, when the Wildcats hosted the Penn State Nittany Lions. Northwestern won 34–13 in the first game at the new stadium.

== Design ==
The new stadium's total footprint was constructed to be 78 percent larger than its predecessor to accommodate club and plaza areas for entertainment and dining spaces, despite having around 12,000 fewer seats. The stadium features a canopy for spectator weather protection and for sound retention as a home-field advantage. As was not required at the time of the original structure's 1926 opening, the stadium also contains required ADA-compliant seats. The design features nearly three times the amount of ADA seating legally required for a venue of that size. The stadium was also designed for an intimate atmosphere. The new stadium's premium seating area starts 90 feet (27 m) from the field, and the most distant seats in the stadium are 135 feet (41 m) away. By contrast, the highest-priced seats at the largest college football venue, Michigan Stadium, are 235 feet (72 m) from the field, and the most distant seats are 253 feet (77 m) from the sideline.

The venue is the smallest home stadium of any team in the power conferences. The lower capacity allows for seating to be closer to the field and eliminates nosebleed seats (which generate the least revenue of any seats). The lower capacity is also reflective of a market in which college football attendance has declined, and a greater share of revenue is being generated by premium seating and hospitality options. 10 percent of the stadium's seats are in premium sections, and these are anticipated to produce around 40 to 50 percent of revenue for football games. Among the premium options are four club areas that will also be utilized year-round as event spaces.

The stadium also features 200,000 square feet (19,000 m^{2}) of plaza and open spaces around the stadium that are part of the ticketed area during games, providing more spaces for fans to congregate than the previous stadium had offered.

== Transportation ==
Public transit within walking distance includes Metra's Central Street station and Chicago Transit Authority's Central station on the Purple Line.

== Other planned uses ==
Northwestern will also use the new stadium as its women's lacrosse home, and the local Evanston Township High School will play select home football games there. Pat Ryan Jr., son of the new stadium's namesake, called the high school a "second anchor tenant".
