= Wilmette station (Chicago and North Western Railway) =

- Chicago and Northwestern Depot
- U.S. National Register of Historic Places
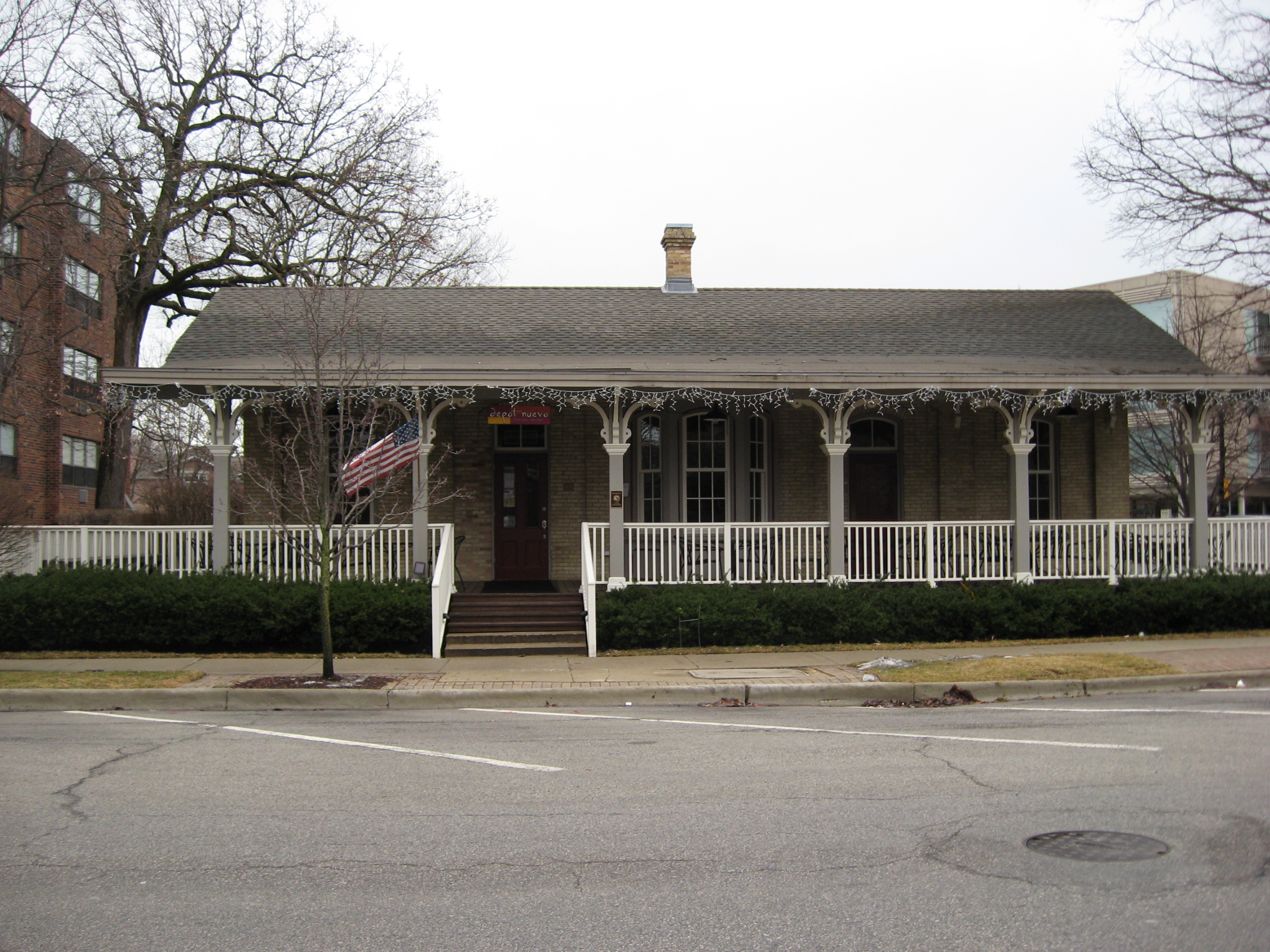

- Location within Chicago metropolitan area Location within Illinois Location within the United States
- Location: 1135-1141 Wilmette Avenue; Wilmette, Illinois
- Coordinates: 42°4′39″N 87°42′20″W
- Built: 1873
- NRHP reference No.: 75000658
- Added to NRHP: 1975

The Chicago and Northwestern Depot is a former railway station in Wilmette, Illinois, which has been on the National Register of Historic Places since 1975. The station served the Chicago and North Western Railway along what is now Metra's Union Pacific North Line. It was built in 1873 as a passenger station and became a freight station in the 1890s before closing in 1946. The station was relocated to its current location on June 13, 1974, and it has since been remodeled as a restaurant. The depot has been called "Wilmette's most historic building," and the Chicago Sunday Times referred to the station as "the finest station on the entire line" upon its opening.

== History ==
The first railroad depot in Wilmette was built in 1870–71 for $700 by a group of landowners hoping to develop the area. As well as being used as a railroad depot, this original depot was used for local elections, including the referendum on the incorporation of Wilmette in 1872. This depot burned down, and residents built the Chicago and Northwestern Depot in 1873. The depot was built to be fireproof and cost $3,400, which was donated by ten residents. The depot was designed in the Italianate style and was a brick building with a gabled roof and columns in front. In the 1890s, Wilmette's growing number of commuters wanted a new depot to be built on the inbound side of the tracks. The Chicago and Northwestern Depot was moved one block north from the passenger station and became Wilmette's freight depot. The depot remained a freight depot until 1946, when Wilmette's freight service was transferred to Evanston; the station was then boarded up, and its platform was removed. On June 13, 1974, the station was moved away from the railroad tracks to its current site to avoid demolition. The depot was added to the National Register of Historic Places in 1975. A cable television company leased the station for several years after its relocation. The building was leased to a different family and converted into a restaurant called the Old Ouilmette Depot in 1992. The restaurant closed after a 2004 fire, and the building remained vacant until 2008, when a new restaurant called Depot Nuevo opened in the building.

Preceding station	Chicago and North Western Railway	Following station
Kenilworth toward Milwaukee	Milwaukee Division	Central Street toward Chicago
