= Central Street Historic District (Millville, Massachusetts) =

Historic district in Massachusetts, United States

- U.S. National Register of Historic Places
- U.S. Historic district
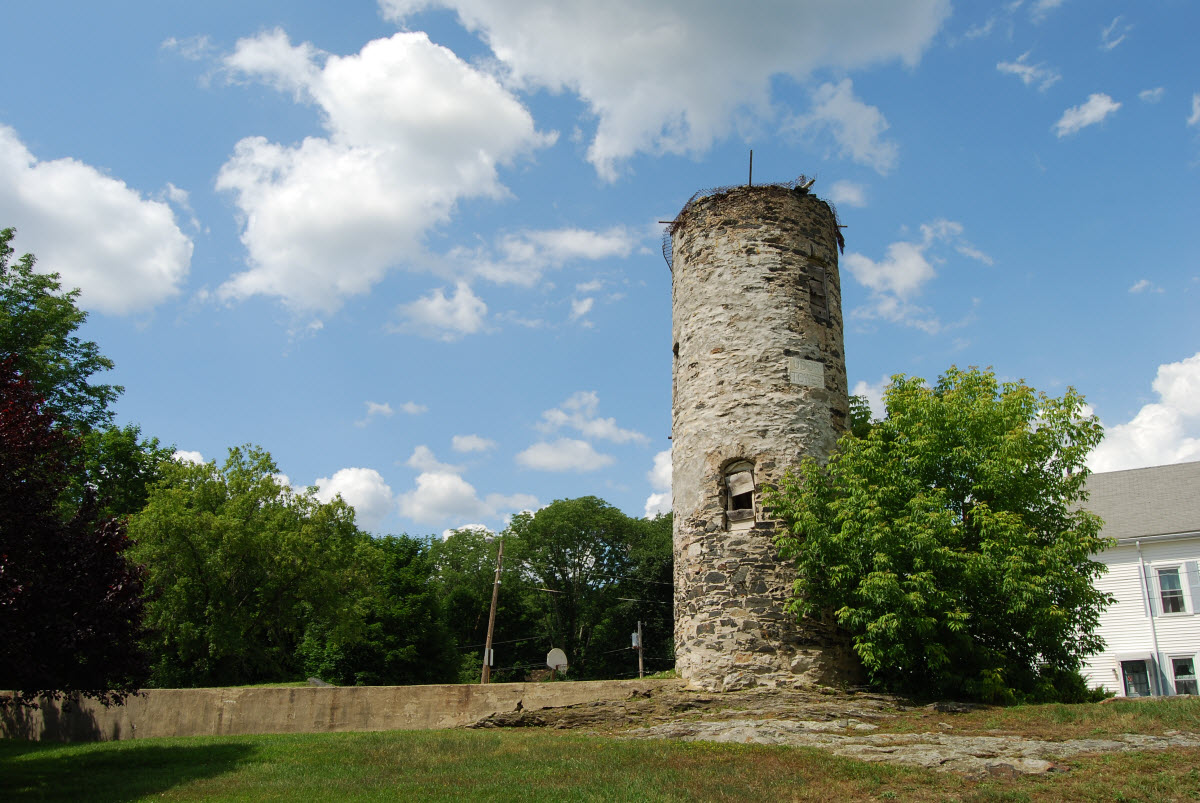
- Udor Tower

- Location within Massachusetts Location within the United States
- Location: Millville, Massachusetts
- Coordinates: 42°1′26″N 71°34′58″W
- Area: 50 acres (20 ha)
- Built: 1732
- Architect: Upjohn, Richard; Fletcher, Charles H.
- Architectural style: Colonial, Greek Revival
- NRHP reference No.: 03000550
- Added to NRHP: June 20, 2003

The Central Street Historic District is a historic district encompassing a portion of the historic village center of Millville, Massachusetts. Its spine is Central Street, the main north–south artery through the town, running from Main Street in the north to just south of Quaker Street in the south. The district includes adjoining properties on a number of side streets. The northern end is discontiguous with Millville's Main Street Historic District, on the north side of the Blackstone River, because of the demolition of historic buildings and alterations to the junction of Main and Central Streets. Until July 2016, Millville's town offices were located in the former Longfellow School, built in 1850 and located at 8 Central Street. South of the river there is more of a commercial center, and as Central Street climbs the hillside above the river, it becomes more residential. This last area was where the fashionable homes of Millville's wealthier residents were built. The oldest portions of the district are the remnant sites of the mills which prompted the growth of the town. These were built on an island in the river, although later mills (none of which survive) were built on its northern and southern banks.

The district was listed on the National Register of Historic Places in 2003.

== See also ==
- National Register of Historic Places listings in Worcester County, Massachusetts
