= Central Street District =

- U.S. National Register of Historic Places
- U.S. Historic district
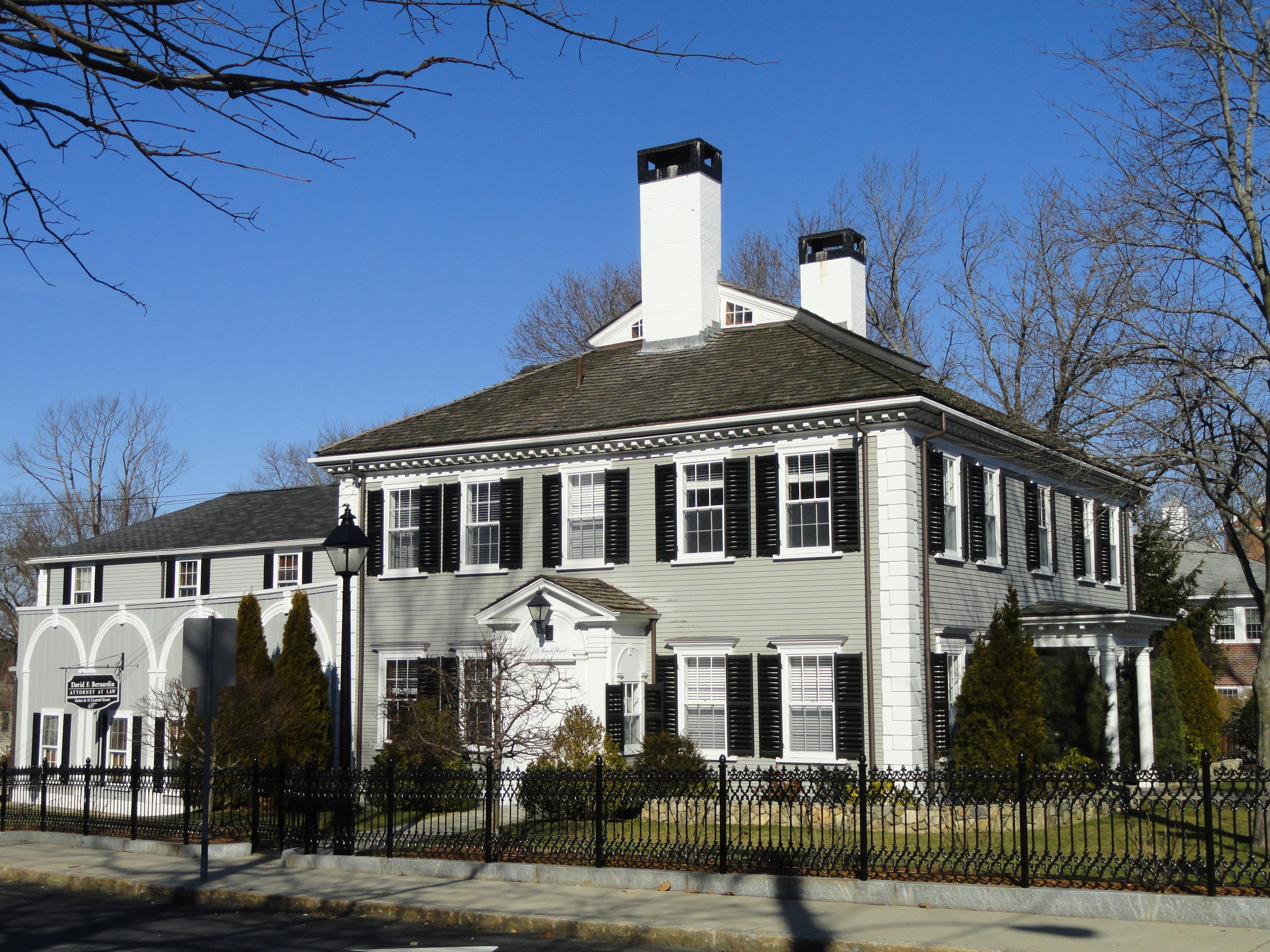

- Location within Massachusetts Location within the United States
- Location: Andover, Massachusetts
- Coordinates: 42°39′6″N 71°8′41″W
- Architect: Jacob Chickering, William Stuart Jenkins
- Architectural style: Mid 19th Century Revival
- MPS: Town of Andover MRA
- NRHP reference No.: 82000478
- Added to NRHP: October 7, 1982

The Central Street District is a historic district encompassing the traditional heart of Andover, Massachusetts prior to the development in the later 19th century of the current town center. It consists mainly of residential and religious properties along Central Street, from Phillips Street in the south to Essex Street in the north. All of the listed properties have frontage on Central Street, even if their addresses are on one of the adjacent streets.

By the late 18th century, Central Street was already an important thoroughfare, connecting Boston and Salem to Haverhill and the traditional center of Andover, now North Andover. The South Church, the first church of present-day Andover, was built along the road in 1709. The current building is a Romanesque Revival structure, built in 1861. The architectural styles of the houses in the district represent a cross section of styles from Federal to Colonial Revival, with none in particular predominating. The houses are generally of high quality construction, and represent their architectural styles well.

In addition to the South Church, the district has two other churches. The oldest of the three is the brick Greek Revival First Baptist Church, built in 1834 by locally noted builder Jacob Chickering. The youngest is the Episcopal Church building, a fine Richardsonian Romanesque structure designed by Hartwell and Richardson for a congregation established in 1835.

The district was listed on the National Register of Historic Places in 1982.

== See also ==
- National Register of Historic Places listings in Andover, Massachusetts
- National Register of Historic Places listings in Essex County, Massachusetts
