= Taxis of New York City =

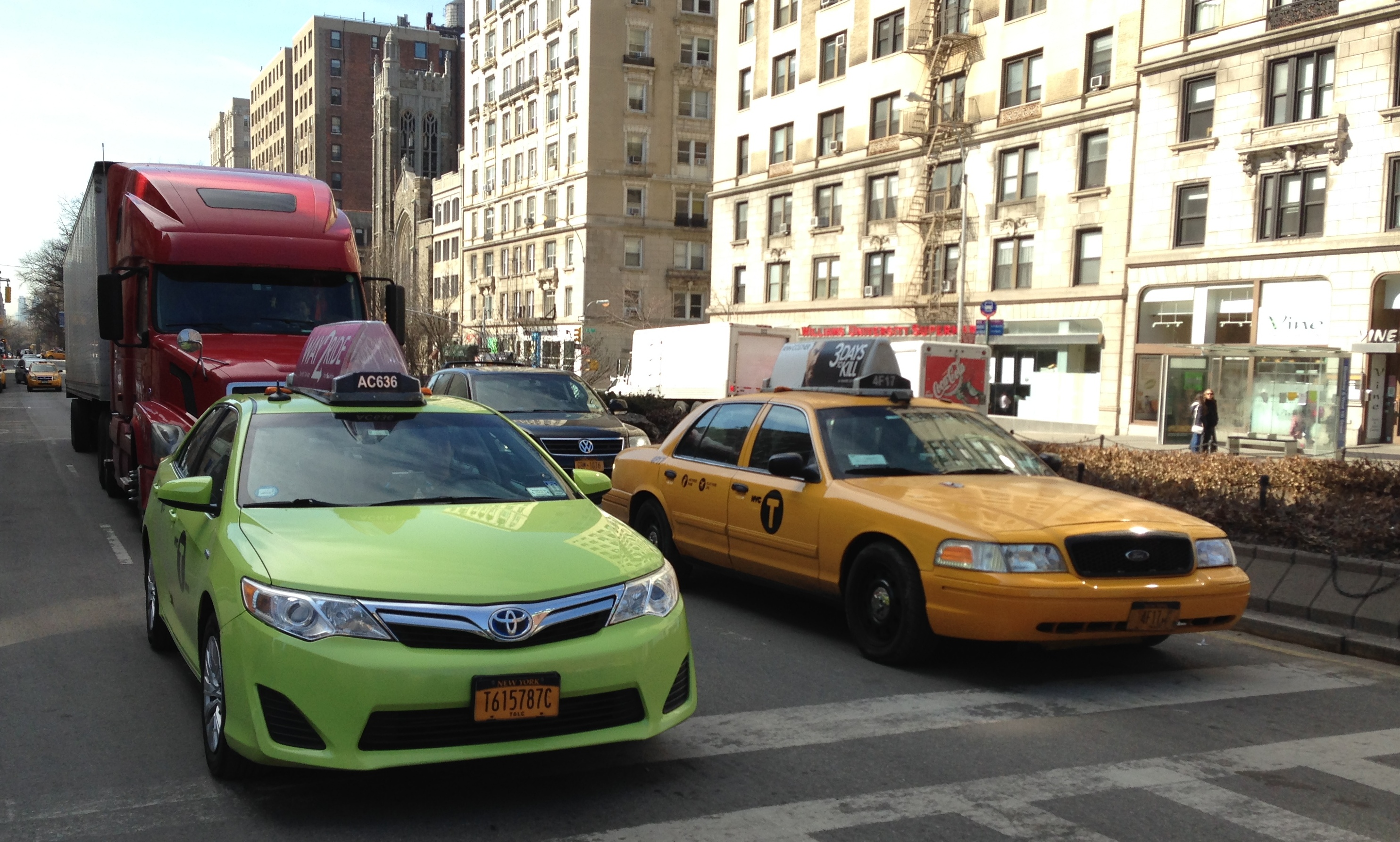
Boro taxi (left) and Yellow Medallion taxi

Taxicabs in New York City come in two varieties: yellow and green; they are widely recognizable symbols of the city. Taxis painted yellow (medallion taxis) are able to pick up passengers anywhere in the five boroughs. Taxis painted apple green (street hail livery vehicles, commonly known as "boro taxis"), which began to appear in August 2013, are allowed to pick up passengers in Upper Manhattan, the Bronx, Brooklyn, Queens (excluding LaGuardia Airport and John F. Kennedy International Airport), and Staten Island. Both types have the same fare structure. Taxicabs are operated by private individuals or companies and licensed by the New York City Taxi and Limousine Commission (TLC). It also oversees over 40,000 other for-hire vehicles, including "black cars", commuter vans, and ambulettes.

Taxicab vehicles, each of which must have a medallion to operate, are driven an average of 180 miles (290 km) per shift. As of March 14, 2014, there were 51,398 individuals licensed to drive medallion taxicabs. There were 13,605 taxicab medallion licenses in existence. By July 2016, that number had dropped slightly to 13,587 medallions, or 18 lower than the 2014 total. Taxi patronage has declined since 2011 due to competition from ridesharing companies.

The medallion system was created in 1937 as a government imposed limitation on the supply of taxicabs, requiring that a medallion be purchased for the right to operate a taxi. Thereafter, New York did not sell any medallions until 1996, when it auctioned slightly more than 2,000. The lack of new medallions resulted in such a shortage that by 2014 they were selling for more than $1 million each, with about 14,000 medallions in existence. Since then, the increase in rideshare vehicles, which numbered about 63,000 in 2015 and 100,000 by August 2018, has drastically reduced the market price of medallions.

As of September 2012, there are around 7,990 hybrid taxi vehicles, representing almost 59% of the taxis in service, as of 2023, there are over 12,000 taxis in New York City, the most in any city in North America. The Nissan NV200 won the city's bid to become the "Taxi of Tomorrow" to replace most of the city's taxi fleet, with its introduction scheduled for October 2012. Nevertheless, this decision has faced several lawsuits and criticism, with the NV200 subject to comparisons with more cost-effective and widely adopted models. As of March 14, 2014, 6,000 Street Hail Livery (SHL) permits have been issued, 20% of which must be used with wheelchair-accessible vehicles, with 4,478 Street Hail Livery vehicles already in use by that time.

== Industry ==
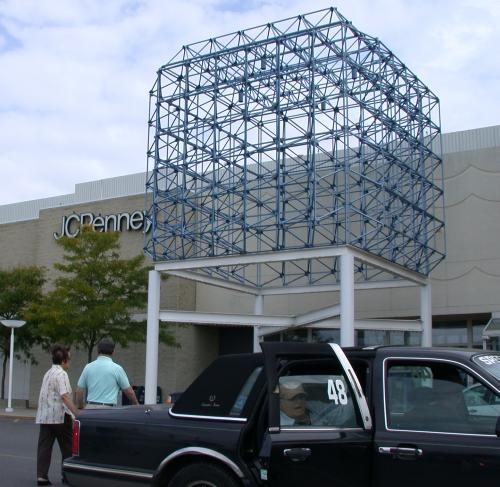
A livery car on Richmond Avenue in Staten Island

All types of taxis are licensed by the New York City Taxi and Limousine Commission (TLC), which oversees for-hire vehicles, taxis, commuter vans, and paratransit vehicles. The iconic taxicabs come in two colors. The apple green taxis, which are called street hail livery vehicles or "boro taxis," operate only outside the Manhattan central business district, excluding John F. Kennedy International Airport and LaGuardia Airport. These taxis started operating in August 2013, with 18,000 licenses being added in three waves of 6,000; the first group of 6,000 licenses was added in 2014. The yellow "medallion" taxicabs can pick up anywhere in the city, and numbered 13,437 licenses in 2014.

The TLC oversees over 100,000 for-hire vehicles, including "black cars"; "livery cars"; commuter "dollar vans"; luxury limousines; and paratransit vehicles. Black cars cannot be hailed on the street, instead they must be dispatched by a parent business. These businesses formerly used luxury cars such as a Lincoln Town Car due to their almost-exclusively business clientele, and drivers ordinarily get less than 10% of their income in cash. There were around 500 base stations for black cars, comprising a total fleet of 25,000 vehicles, as of the 2014 TLC Factbook. Livery cars are similar to black cars, but are used by a greater range of people. There were 80 livery bases and 10,000 livery vehicles in 2014. Commuter vans carry more people, usually between 9 and 20 passengers per trip. Commuter van licenses were held by 50 entities, which collectively owned 500 vehicles, in 2014. Luxury limousine providers and private paratransit companies numbered 200 each in 2014, collectively chartering 7,000 luxury limousine vehicles and 2,000 paratransit vehicles. In 2015, there were 14,000 for-hire vehicles associated with one or more of four ride-sharing companies of the time: Juno, Lyft, Uber, and Via. By 2018, over 80,000 such vehicles were being driven for "ride-share".

The average hourly gross income for a medallion driver in 2015 was $30.41, not including tips, according to the 2016 TLC Factbook. Boro (green) taxi drivers made $20.63, also excluding tips. Evening hours are typically more lucrative. Medallion Taxis collectively make between 300,000 and 400,000 trips a day, while Green Taxis, which hit the road in New York City in 2013, do almost 50,000 daily on average. While the TLC does not regulate specific shifts, the morning shift for a medallion taxi typically begins at 5:30 a.m., and the evening shift often starts at 5:15 p.m.. Trips peak Friday evenings for medallion cabs, and Saturday night for Green Taxis.

There were about 143,674 taxis and for-hire vehicles licensed by the TLC in 2015, according to the 2016 Factbook. These include 13,587 Medallion Taxicabs; 7,676 boro taxis; 38,791 black cars; 21,932 livery cars; 288 commuter vans; and 2,206 paratransit vehicles. Passengers in New York City can arrange rides using smartphone apps in yellow medallion taxicabs, Boro (green) cabs, and for-hire vehicles. Each type of TLC-licensed vehicle has its own set of guidelines in regards to app usage, and the TLC has adopted new rules that codify these standards. Any companies that want to operate point-to-point for-hire service within the five boroughs, whether through an app or a phone call, need a TLC license to operate. They must also work only with TLC-licensed drivers and vehicles.

TLC-licensed drivers self-reported 167 different countries as their place of birth in the 2000 United States census, and of all TLC drivers in 2000, 84% were immigrants, up from the 64% figure reported in 1990 and the 38% reported in 1980. That year, about 18% of drivers identified their place of birth as Bangladesh, the country where the most taxi drivers reported themselves as having been born. Drivers providing app-based services identify most commonly as being born in South Asia and the Caribbean/West Indies. Additionally, 97% of New York City taxi drivers self-reported as male and only 2.5% to 3% self-reported as female. This still held mostly true in 2015, where the greatest number of TLC drivers, about 14%, identified their place of birth as Bangladesh, followed by 12% the Dominican Republic; 9% each from the United States and Pakistan; and 6% from India. As of 2015, about half of traditional for-hire vehicle drivers were from the Dominican Republic, and nearly a quarter of medallion drivers were from Bangladesh. Additionally, the vast majority of TLC drivers were still male, with female TLC drivers making up from 1% of medallion taxi drivers to 4% of app-based for-hire vehicle drivers. The average TLC driver was middle-aged, with app-based drivers having a median age of 39 and all other drivers having a median age of 46–47.

The TLC has a Driver Safety Honor Roll which recognizes the safest Taxi and For-Hire Vehicle drivers in New York City. Drivers on the Honor Roll have had no crashes involving fatalities or injuries, no traffic violations, and no violations of TLC safety-related rules for five years or more.

=== Hailing ===
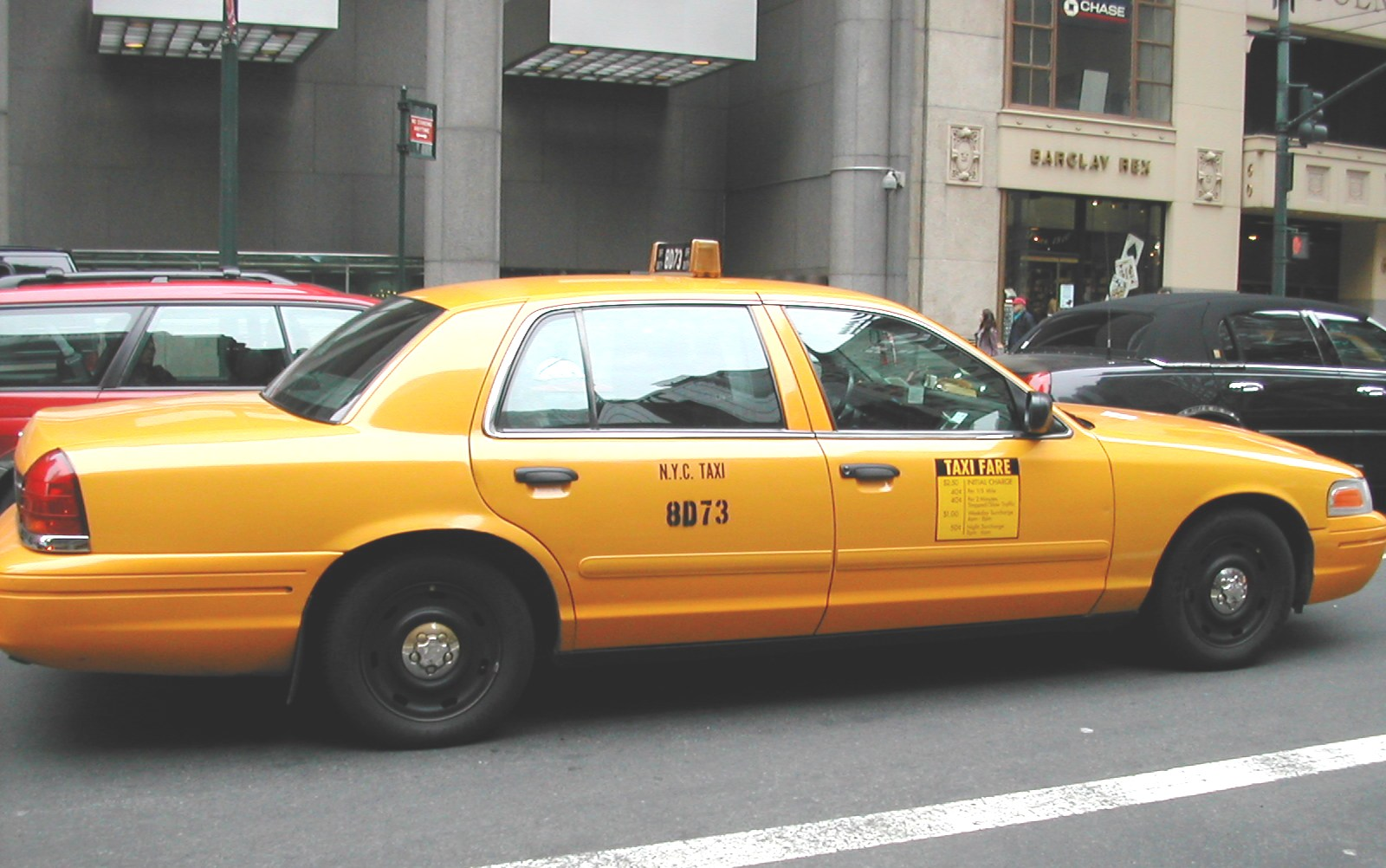
New York medallion taxicab in a prior livery. The medallion number is on the side of the taxicab.

Medallion (yellow) cabs are concentrated in the borough of Manhattan, but can be hailed anywhere throughout the five boroughs of New York City and may be hailed with a raised hand or at a taxi stand. Boro taxis in "apple green" color can be hailed only in the outer boroughs (except at the airports) and in the northern part of Manhattan, specifically above 96th Street on the East Side and above 110th Street on the West Side.

Before 2011, a cab's availability was indicated by the lights on the top of the car. When no lights were lit, the cab would be occupied by passengers. When just the center light showing the medallion number was lit, the cab would be empty and available. When the OFF and DUTY inscriptions to either side of the medallion number were lit, with the medallion number off, the cab would be off duty and not accepting passengers. However, when the OFF and DUTY inscriptions were lit and the medallion number was still lit, the cab would be off duty but the driver could choose to pick up passengers heading in the same direction as the driver. In fall 2011, the TLC announced a plan to replace the three-light system with a simple indicator as to whether the taxi is available. In 2012, the TLC simplified the light system further, with a lit roof light indicating that the taxi is available and an unlit light indicating that the taxi is not available, regardless of whether it has passengers or is simply off duty. It also started fining drivers $100 for picking up passengers without the light on, except for if the driver is picking up their last passenger of their shift.

As with livery cabs, there is an additional round amber light mounted on the left side of the trunk, as well as an amber light at the front of the cab, usually hidden from view behind the grille. When activated by the driver, these "trouble lights" blink to summon the police.

A maximum of four passengers may be carried in most cabs, although larger minivans may accommodate five passengers. Previously one child under seven could sit on an adult's lap in the back seat if the maximum has been reached. As of 2024, however, New York State law requires that all children under the age of 4 ride in child safety seats and all children ride in child restraint systems until their 8th birthday. Drivers are required to pick up the first or closest passenger they see, and may not refuse a trip to a destination anywhere within the five boroughs, neighboring Westchester or Nassau, or Newark Liberty International Airport. The TLC undertakes undercover operations to ensure cabbies do not engage in racial profiling or otherwise discriminate against passengers hailing cabs.

There are mobile apps designed to help people find, hail, and share cabs in New York City:

- In March 2010, Sense Networks released CabSense. The iPhone/Android phone app uses location data collected from the New York City Taxi and Limousine Commission to predict which corners in New York City are best for finding and hailing a cab at any given hour of any given day of the week.
- Carmel released its Mobile App in 2012, allowing customers to order car service in all of New York City. The app complies with all state rules and has won the Taxi and Limousine Commission's approval.
- The Hailo app, using technology by VeriFone allows users to hail taxicabs and automatic accept payments (including tips) using their smartphones.
- The GetTaxi or Gett app allows users to call taxis to their location and pay automatically through the app. Gett also offers $10 rides within Central Manhattan.

The majority of electronic hails in 2016 came from northern Brooklyn; the Upper East and Upper West Sides of Manhattan; Astoria, Queens; and East Village, Manhattan. In 2015, the TLC recorded 7 million trips in the 541 wheelchair-accessible vehicles, up from 6 million in the previous year.

=== Fares ===
As of September 4, 2012, fares begin at $2.50 ($3.00 between 8:00 p.m. and 6:00 am, and $3.50 during the peak weekday hours of 4:00–8:00 p.m.) and increase based on the distance traveled and time spent in slow traffic (50 cents for each one-fifth mile (0.32 km) or each 50 seconds stopped or traveling under 12 mph (19 km/h)). An additional 50¢ tax is added to all trips within New York City. For trips to Nassau and Westchester counties, fare is the metered rate from the point of origin to the city limit, then twice the metered rate from the city limit to the destination. All trips between Manhattan and John F. Kennedy International Airport are charged a flat rate of $52. All trips to Newark Airport are charged the metered rate plus $17.50. The passenger also has to pay for any portion of the trip where the cab is driven on a toll road. The taxi must have an E-ZPass tag, and passengers pay the discounted E-ZPass toll rates.

Fares were increased at the end of 2022. Under the new plan, fares begin at $3.00. An additional surcharge of $2.50 applies during weekday rush hours, and a surcharge of $1 applies during overnight hours. In addition, all trips between Manhattan and JFK Airport are charged a flat rate of $70, and all trips to or from LaGuardia Airport will be charged the metered rate plus $5.

In 1999, 241 million passengers rode in New York taxis. The average cab fare in 2000 was $6; passengers paid a total of over $1 billion in fares that year. By 2006, the number had remained unchanged at about 240 million annual passengers.

According to an April 2011 study by the Chicago Dispatcher, New York City taxis have a relatively low standard fare, charging an estimated $14.10 for a distance of 5 miles (8.0 km) and five minutes' wait time (compared to an estimated $18.48 in West Hollywood and $12.87 in Houston). Taxi drivers are not permitted to use cell phones while transporting passengers, even if they use a hands-free headset, although this is widely ignored by drivers. As of 2006, drivers earned an average of $158 after a 12-hour shift, but this figure has declined in the succeeding years, given that an increasing number of medallions have been leased since then.

== History ==
=== Medallion taxis ===
==== Late 1890s ====
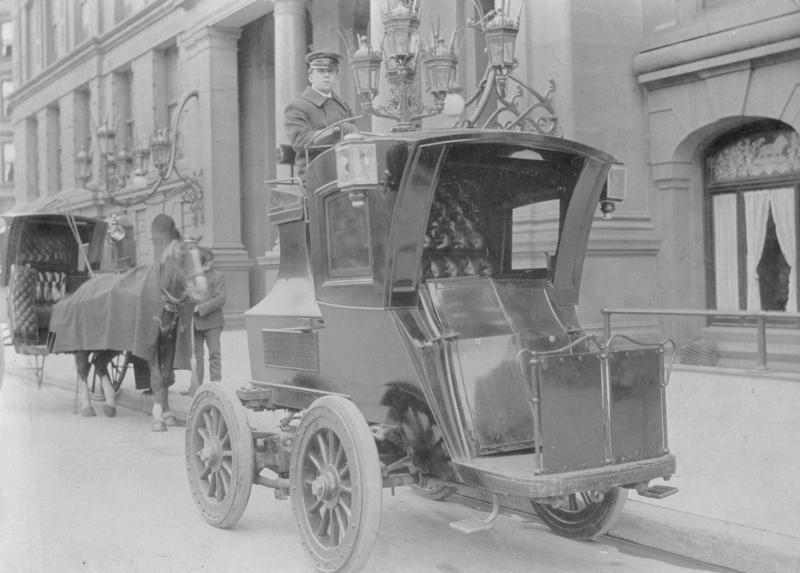
This ca. 1904 Columbia Hansom Cab is similar to the 1890s E.V.C. cabs

The first taxicab company in New York City was the Samuel's Electric Carriage and Wagon Company (E.C.W.C.), which began running 12 electric hansom cabs in July 1897. By August 1897 the 12-cab fleet had traveled more than 14,000 miles and carried nearly 5,000 passengers. The company ran until 1898 with up to 62 cabs operating until it was reformed by its financiers to form the Electric Vehicle Company. The company then built the Electrobat electric car, and had up to 100 taxicabs running in total by 1899.

1899 also saw a number of notable firsts for the Electric Vehicle Company. On May 20, 1899, Jacob German, driving an electric taxicab received the first speeding ticket in the United States. Later that year, on September 13, Henry Bliss became the first victim of an automotive accident in the United States when he was hit by an electric taxicab as he was helping a friend from a streetcar.

By the early 1900s the Electric Vehicle Company was running up to 1,000 electric taxicabs on the streets of New York City until, in January 1907, a fire destroyed 300 of these vehicles, which, in conjunction with the Panic of 1907 caused the company to collapse.

==== Early 20th century ====
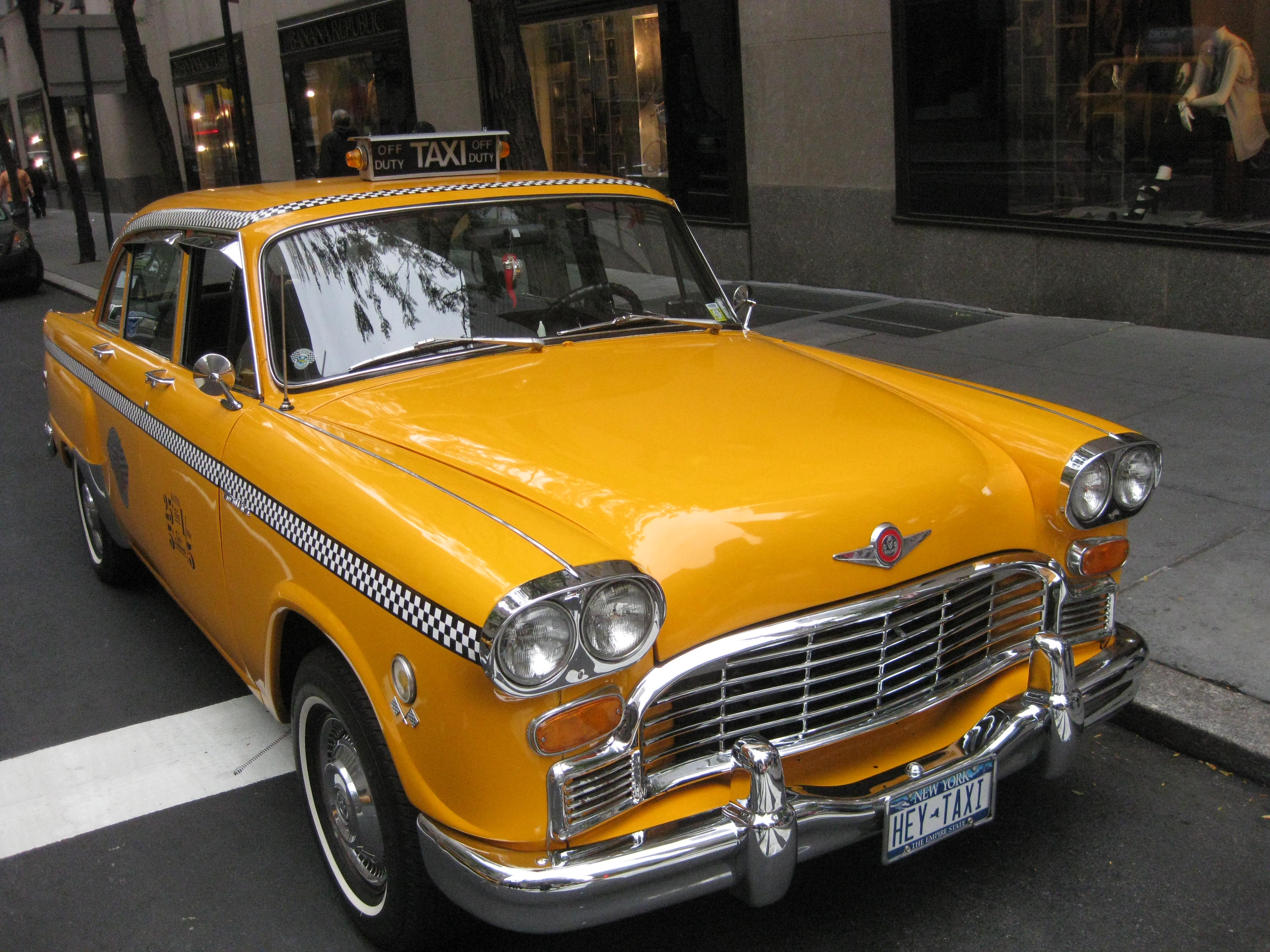
A Checker Cab

In 1907, following the collapse of the Electric Vehicle Company, horse-drawn cabs once again became a primary means of transport around New York City. In early 1907 Harry N. Allen, incensed after being charged five dollars (equivalent to $170 in 2025) for a journey of 0.75 miles (1.2 km), decided "to start a [taxicab] service in New York and charge so-much per mile." Later that year he imported 65 gasoline-powered cars from France and began the New York Taxicab Company. The cabs were originally painted red and green, but Allen repainted them all yellow to be visible from a distance. By 1908 the company was running 700 taxicabs.

Within a decade several more companies opened business and taxicabs began to proliferate. The fare was 50 cents a mile (equivalent to $16 in 2025), a rate only affordable to the relatively wealthy. After America's entry into the First World War, taxis became increasingly popular sites for both sex work and casual (non-monetary) sex, and the city's cabbies were subsequently targeted for surveillance by police and private organizations associated with the Progressive Era Social hygiene movement, especially the Committee of Fourteen.

By the 1920s, automobile manufacturers like General Motors and the Ford Motor Company began operating fleets. The most successful manufacturer, however, was the Checker Cab Manufacturing Company. Founded by Morris Markin, Checker Cabs produced large yellow and black taxis that became the most common taxis in New York City.

==== 1930s ====
During the Great Depression, New York had as many as 30,000 cab drivers. With more drivers than passengers, cab drivers were working longer hours, which led to growing public concern over the maintenance and mechanical integrity of taxi vehicles. To resolve these issues, the city considered creating a taxi monopoly, but the plan was abandoned after New York City Mayor Jimmy Walker was accused of accepting a bribe from the Parmelee Company, the largest taxi company.

In 1937, Mayor Fiorello H. La Guardia signed the Haas Act, which introduced official taxi licenses and the medallion system that remains in place today. The law limited the total number of cab licenses to 16,900, but the number dwindled to 11,787 licenses, staying equal over the next six decades.

In 1949, several thousand taxicab workers went on strike during an organization effort by the United Mine Workers. The strike lasted approximately 1 week and ended in failure for the strikers.

==== 1960s ====
In the 1960s, New York City experienced many of the problems other cities did. Crime and racial tensions increased. As a result, a quickly growing industry of private livery services emerged, commonly referred to as "car services". Unofficial drivers were barred from picking up people on the street, but they readily found business in under-served neighborhoods.

In 1967, New York City ordered all "medallion taxis" be painted yellow to help cut down on unofficial drivers and make official taxicabs more readily recognizable. The wife of the president of New Departure, Nettie Rockwell, particularly liked the color yellow and it therefore became the color of the new Rockwell taxicabs. The Rockwell Service Cab became the Yellow Taxicab when Mrs. Rockwell selected that as her choice of color for the auto.

==== 1970s ====
The New York City Taxi and Limousine Commission (TLC) was established in 1971 with jurisdiction over the city's medallion (yellow) taxicabs, livery cabs, "black cars", commuter vans, paratransit vehicles (ambulettes (Note: See also Ambulance#Ambulette)), and some luxury limousines. Its predecessor was the New York City Hack Bureau, operated under the aegis of the New York City Police Department. TLC Inspectors are New York State peace officers.

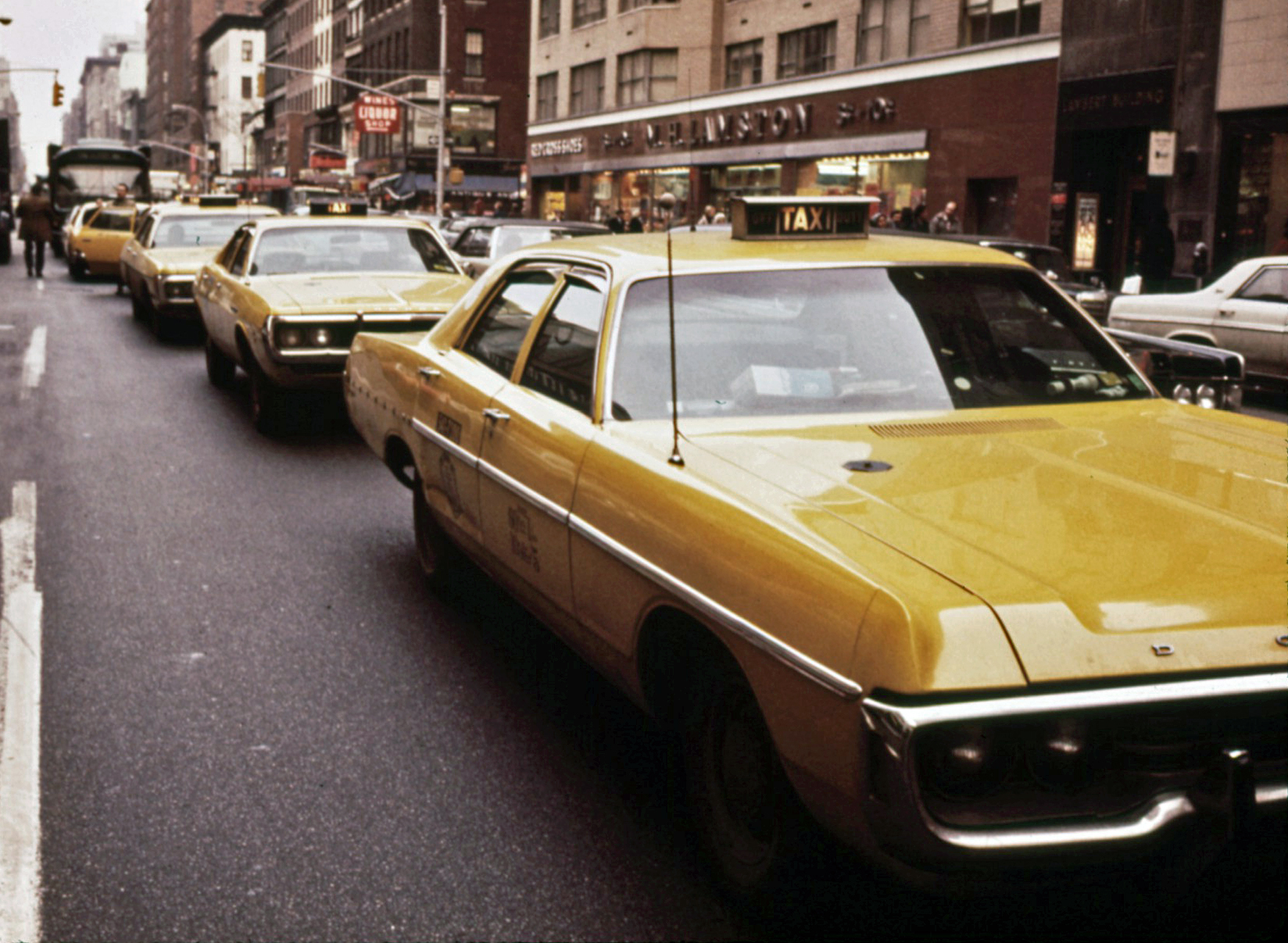
Lineup of cabs in 1973

In the 1970s and 1980s, crime in New York City had become extremely severe. Cabbies were often robbed, injured, or murdered. Despite widespread use of bullet-resistant taxi partitions, introduced in 1967, seven cab drivers were killed and 3,000 were robbed in the first nine months of 1970. The response from regulators was to contend that "continued violent crime against cab drivers" (despite partition mandates) merited a new "lock-box" requirement. That requirement was abandoned, quietly, after it was realized that in response, the cabs themselves in the city were being stolen.

By the mid-1970s, there was a shortage in drivers, and as many as one-fifth of taxicabs were in the garage at any given time. Drivers only needed to take a test to show proof that they understood English; demonstrate knowledge of 29 major corridors and 168 routes to popular landmarks; and be able to point out the locations of ten to fifteen landmarks, using a geographical directory provided during the test. Despite the fact that many potential applicants did not know locations outside Manhattan well, almost all applicants passed the test. By 1975, although the TLC was issuing 40,000 licenses yearly, there was a high proportion of new drivers: less than one-third of the 40,000 licenses were those being renewed by cab drivers who were already working, while two-thirds of the licenses were issued to new drivers.

==== 1980s ====
From the mid-1980s into the 1990s, demographics changed among cabbies as new waves of immigrants arrived to New York City. According to the 2000 U.S. Census, of the 62,000 cab drivers in New York City, 82% were foreign born: 23% being from the Caribbean (the Dominican Republic and Haiti) and 30% being from South Asia (Bangladesh, India, and Pakistan).

Throughout the 1980s, working conditions for cabbies changed as crime in New York City was curtailed. Additionally, the cost of medallion licenses increased and fewer cabbies owned their taxicabs.

In 1982, production of the iconic Checker Taxi Cab ceased although many remained in operation. The Chevrolet Caprice and Ford Crown Victoria became the industry's top choices, with formerly used police cruisers providing a steady supply for cab fleets.

==== 1990s ====
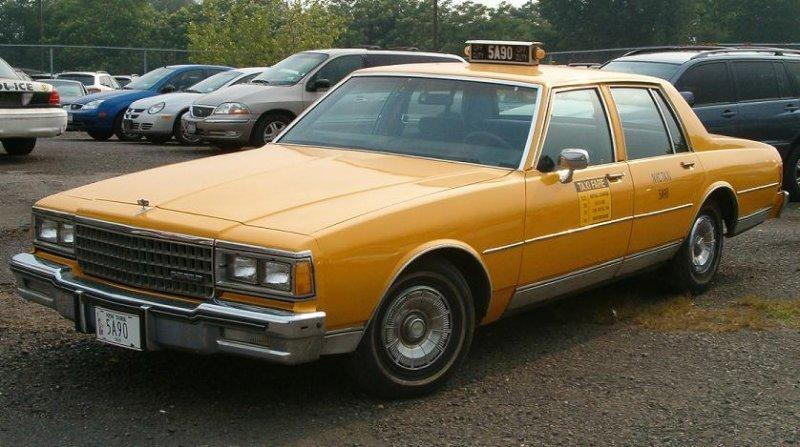
Chevrolet Caprice NYC Cab in the 1990s

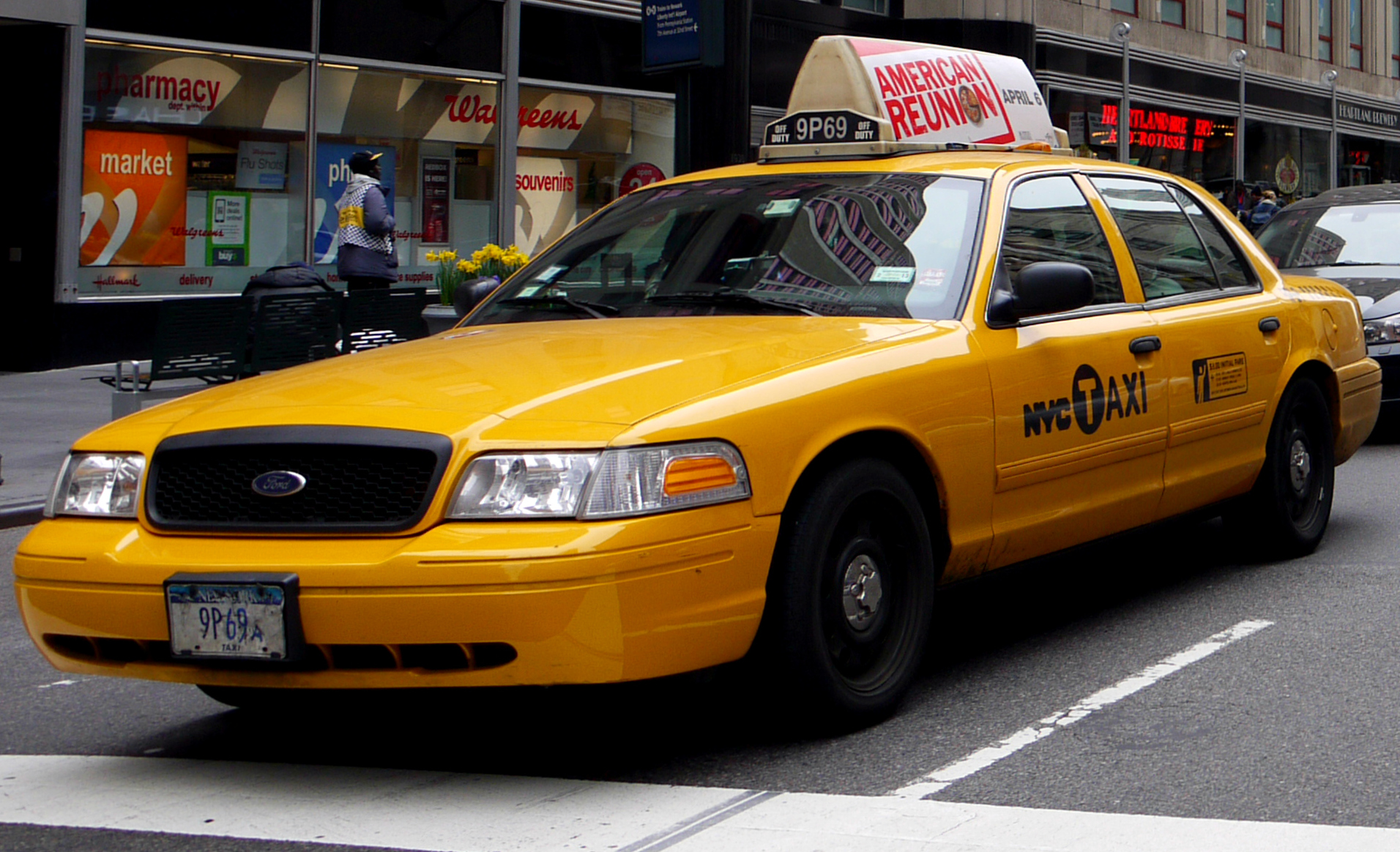
The Ford Crown Victoria became the most used yellow cab in New York City in the 1990s

On July 11, 1992, thousands of taxi drivers used their taxis to block traffic in protest at the number of taxi drivers who had been murdered: 35 taxi drivers had been murdered so far that year, and 45 had been killed the previous year.

Laws since 1996 require that taxis be replaced every six years regardless of condition; this was increased to seven years in 2015, though some taxis are exempt for historical significance. In December 1996, Chevrolet ceased making the Caprice, with the last Caprice 9C6 taxi packages being in service until the early 2000s. The Ford Crown Victoria became the most widely used sedan for yellow cabs in New York. In October 2012, Hurricane Sandy flooded dozens of Crown Victoria taxi cabs. By November 2023, just two Crown Victoria cabs were still in service, with a combined mileage of over 1,000,000 miles (1,600,000 km). These two taxis were taken out of service by 2024. In addition, yellow cab operators also used the Honda Odyssey, Isuzu Oasis, Chevrolet Venture, Ford Freestar, and Toyota Sienna minivans, which offer increased passenger room. The distinctive Checker Taxi cabs were, due to their durable construction, phased out slowly. The last one was retired in July 1999, after more than 20 years in service and with nearly 1,000,000 miles (1,600,000 km) on its odometer.

The same year, the TLC began Operation Refusal, an undercover sting operation created to address the alleged phenomenon of service refusal. In 1998, the TLC enacted a package of regulatory reforms, inspired by Mayor Rudy Giuliani, that included a structured framework of enhanced driver standards. In 1999, actor Danny Glover filed a complaint with the TLC, after he was allegedly refused service by New York cab drivers. This resulted in a highly publicized Operation Refusal crackdown on drivers who were allegedly discriminating against certain passengers, sometimes for race, but far more often because of the passenger's destination.

Many cabdrivers protested the new regulations sought by the Giuliani administration. In 1998, their activity formed the basis of a new taxidrivers' trade union, the New York Taxi Workers Alliance. Under the leadership of Bhairavi Desai, the union grew to fifteen thousand members (2011 estimate), representing almost one-third of all licensed cabdrivers in the city. Giuliani's crackdowns also led to a series of successful lawsuits against the city and the TLC. In 2000, a federal judge ruled that the NYPD had violated taxi drivers' First Amendment rights by refusing to let the drivers engage in a peaceful protest of new rules. The TLC also lost a series of cases in state courts, for implementing rules without allowing for notice and comment. In 2000, another federal judge ruled that the Operation Refusal sting violated cabbies' due process rights. In 2004, TLC inspectors were embarrassed when they handcuffed and arrested 60 Minutes reporter Mike Wallace, charging him with disorderly conduct for allegedly having acted aggressively toward a TLC Inspector in defense of his driver. In 2006, the city was forced to settle the remaining aspects of the Operation Refusal case. Under the settlement, the TLC agreed to pay a group of 500 taxi drivers $7 million.

In order to encourage greater use of passenger seat belts to prevent partition-related injuries, the TLC instituted the "Celebrity Talking Taxi" program in 1997, using celebrity audio messages to urge passengers to buckle up and take a receipt at the ride's conclusion. The messages proved largely unpopular with both drivers and riders, as the TLC learned after conducting an online survey about the program in the fall of 2002. On the strength of those results, the Commission officially terminated the program in February 2003.

In 1996, the number of medallions changed for the first time in 60 years. The TLC added 133 new licenses, bringing the total to 11,920. Since 1996, more medallions have been added to the fleet, bringing the total number of cab licenses to 13,237 as of 2009.

==== 2000s to present ====
===== Changes to cabs =====
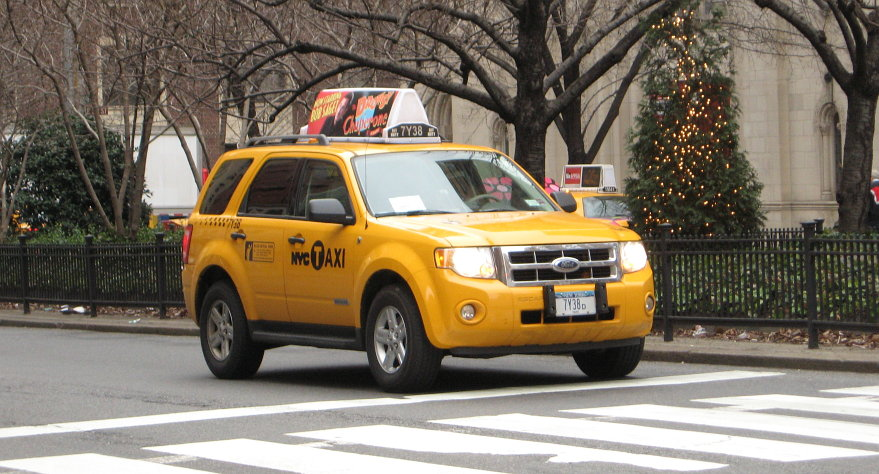
During early adoption of hybrid cab service in New York City in the 2000s, the Ford Escape Hybrid was a popular choice.

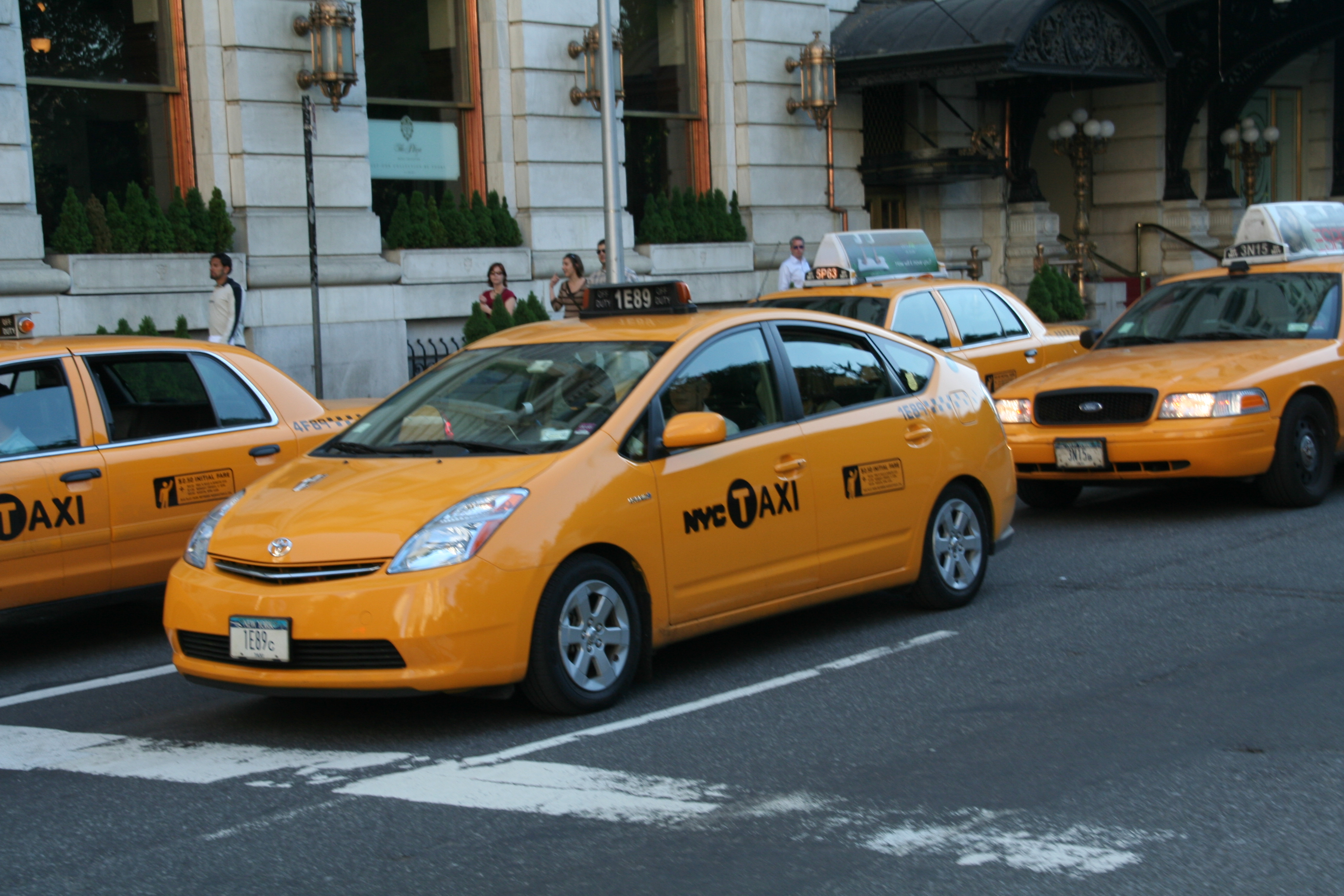
The Toyota Prius was also a popular choice for hybrid cab service in New York City, and has since been succeeded by the larger Toyota Prius V.

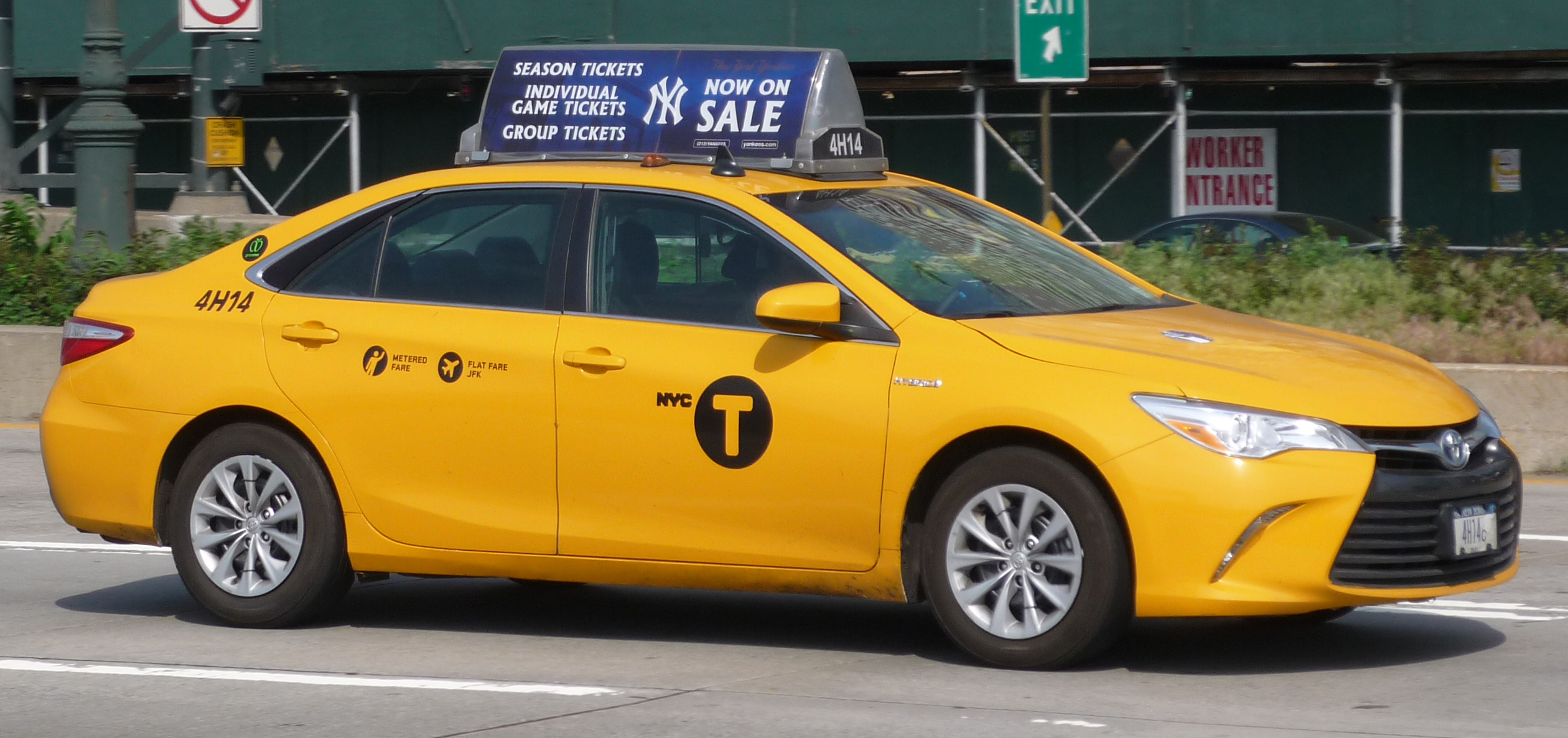
By the mid-2010s the Toyota Camry Hybrid would emerge as a dominant model for New York City taxicabs

In 2005, New York introduced incentives to replace its current yellow cabs with electric hybrid vehicles such as the Toyota Prius and Ford Escape Hybrid. In May 2007, New York City Mayor Michael Bloomberg proposed a five-year plan to switch New York City's taxicabs to more fuel-efficient hybrid vehicles as part of an agenda for New York City to reduce greenhouse gas emissions. However, the plan was dropped after cab companies complained that the cost of maintaining the new hybrid vehicles vastly outweighed the tiny amount of fuel savings they got from going smaller. Proponents of the traditional Lincoln Town Car and Ford Crown Victoria say they were well suited to their task, while others said customers who cared for the environment preferred hybrids. Not only that, but passenger safety also became an issue with the newer vehicles, and 6 months after the program took effect, it was dropped. Still, the proportion of the taxi fleet made up of Crown Victorias has dropped over time. In 2010, it stood at about 60% of yellow cabs, as the number of Ford Escape Hybrid and Toyota Sienna minivans kept rising. The percentage of Crown Victoria taxis in the city would be further undercut by the adoption of the similarly sized Toyota Camry Hybrids since 2010, and the Toyota Prius V. By 2015, the Ford Crown Victoria fleet would be nearly entirely replaced.

Originally, before October 2007, NYC Yellow cabs displayed the fare stickers in the front doors and the words "NYC Taxi" and the medallion number on the back doors. On September 30, 2007, all of the yellow cab decals were redesigned. The cabs were easily identified with the medallion number followed with a checker pattern on the left and right rear fenders, a futuristic fare panel on the rear doors, and a retro "NYC Taxi" logo on the front doors, with a yellow T in a black circle. In August 2012, the TLC phased out the design in favor of one that drops the "axi," leaving only the NYC logo and the circle-T. The detailed fare information on the rear doors was also replaced, replaced with a simple statement of a metered rate unless traveling to JFK Airport, where a flat fare is charged.

The TLC also mandated that by the end of January 2008 all taxis should be equipped with a Passenger Information Monitor that is a screen in the backseat that can provide entertainment, a live GPS map of location, and be used to pay for rides by swiping a credit card. The drivers will have an electronic Driver Information Monitor in which messages can be sent to them informing them of traffic conditions and facilitating retrieving lost objects. Several taxicab drivers objecting to the cost of the devices (estimated at between $3,000 and $5,000 each) staged voluntary strikes on September 5 and 6 and October 22, 2007. The city implemented a "zone pricing" structure during the days and the strikes had minimal impact on the city according to officials.

As of February 2011, New York City had around 4,300 hybrid taxis, representing almost 33% of the 13,237 taxis in service, and about 6,000 by September 2012, representing 59% of the taxis in service—the most in any city in North America. By mid-2009, owners began retiring their original hybrid fleets after they accumulated between 300,000 and 350,000 miles (480,000 and 560,000 km) per vehicle. Two attempts by the Bloomberg administration to implement policies to force the replacement of all 13,000 New York taxis for hybrids by 2012 were blocked by court rulings, and on February 28, 2011, the United States Supreme Court declined to consider an appeal by the city.

===== Taxi of Tomorrow =====
In 2007, city officials outlined a project to replace existing Ford Crown Victoria taxis, the production of which was discontinued in 2011, and other taxis by 2014. In mid-2011, the TLC was to award an exclusive contract to sell and service taxicabs in New York City for 10 years. Karsan, Nissan, and Ford's bids were the three finalists, and all of their designs were based on small vans rather than sedans. The Karsan design was favorite among the New Yorkers. However, the latter was rejected due to doubts whether the company could "execute the project". In the end, New York Mayor Michael Bloomberg announced the Nissan design as the winner to replace the city's 13,000 yellow cabs, to be phased in over five years starting in 2013.

Finalists For Taxi of Tomorrow

Karsan V-1
Rejected

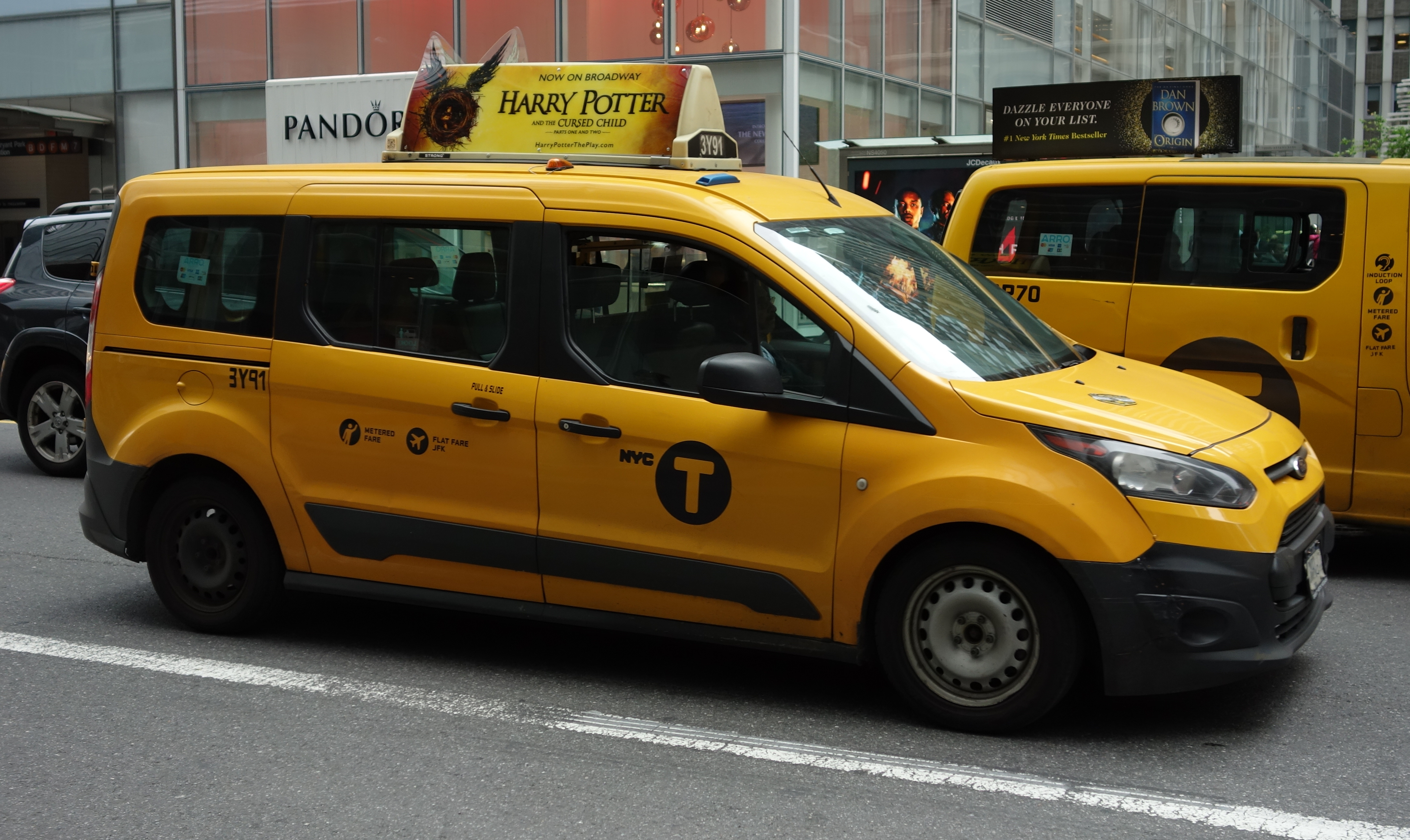
Ford Transit Connect
Rejected

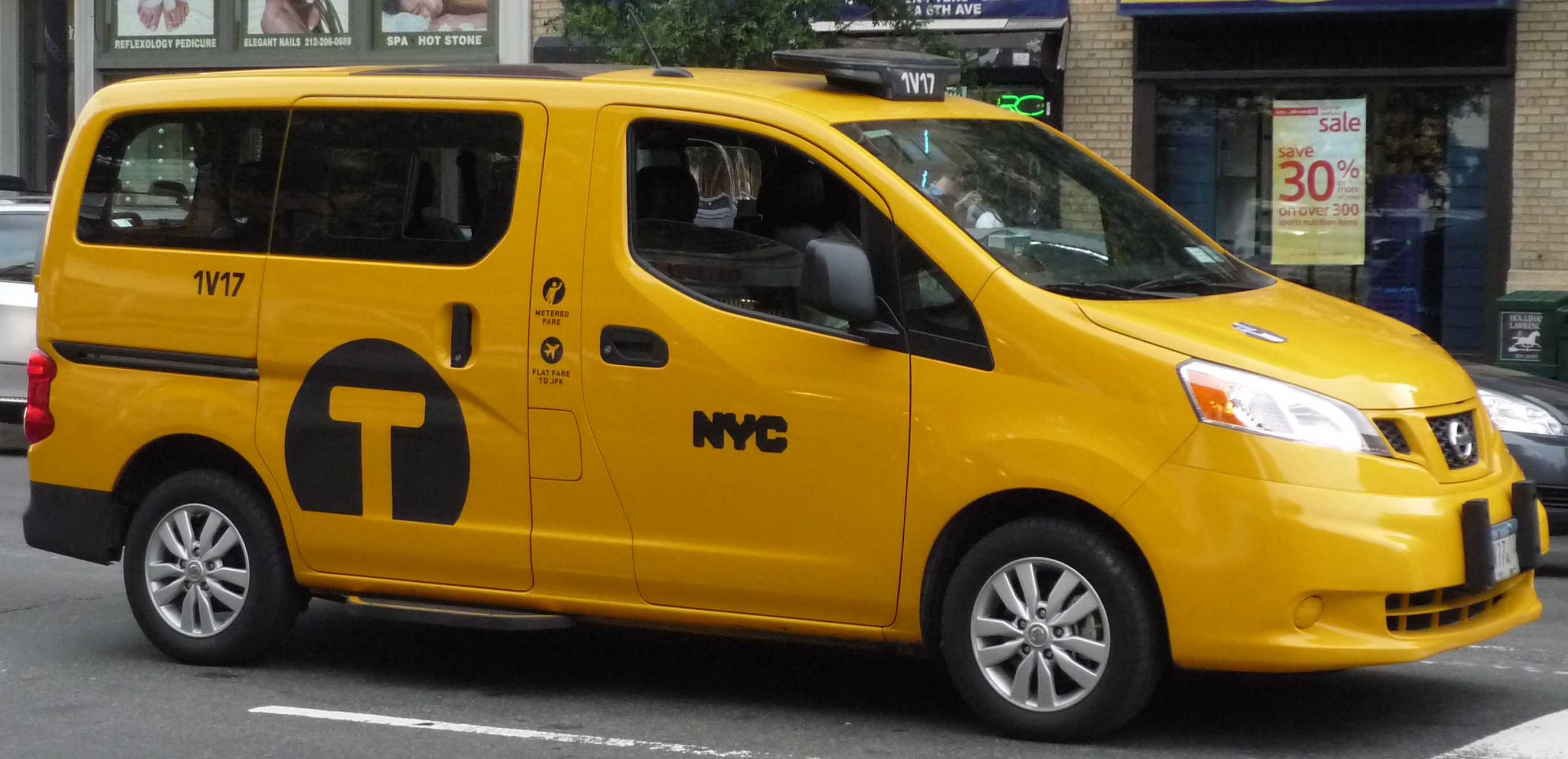
Nissan NV200
Winner

As of August 2013, manufacturing had begun in Cuernavaca, Mexico, where the stock NV200 is also assembled. Design features include room for four passengers, a transparent roof panel, independently controlled rear air conditioning, active carbon-lined headliner to help neutralize interior odors, along with antimicrobial easy-to-clean seat fabric, overhead reading lights, floor lighting, a mobile charging station, including a 12-volt electrical outlet and two USB ports, a flat passenger floor, a "low-annoyance" horn with exterior lights that indicate honking, hearing loop system, intercom and exterior lights that signal when door is opening.

In 2011, New York City was sued by United Spinal Association for choosing an inaccessible "taxi of tomorrow". The Justice Department issued a "Statement of Interest", which was sent to the NY Federal District court, stating that, if the city did not mandate a wheelchair accessible taxi as the "taxi of tomorrow", it would be in violation of the Americans With Disabilities Act. On November 3–5, 2011, at the TLC's public design expo inviting the public to try out parked prototypes, the Taxis For All Campaign mounted a "Roll-In" protest. Under the eye of news media outside the Flatiron Building on Broadway at Fifth Avenue, wheelchair users tried in vain to use the future cabs. Mayor Bloomberg's sustained initiative to amend the law, so that licensed livery cabs may pick up street hails just as yellow medallion cabs do, requires the Governor's approval; but Governor Andrew Cuomo opposes the city's choice of a non-wheelchair-accessible yellow cab. Thus, a compromise plan was announced in December 2011: the next 4,000 new medallions must go to accessible cabs, and the Governor will ratify the Mayor's initiative to let livery cars compete for street hails.

A fully electric version of the Nissan NV200 van may be available by 2017. However, to test the concept, Nissan is sponsoring a pilot program with six Nissan Leaf electric cars and their charging stations, deployed to study the use of zero-emission electric vehicles as taxis. The Leafs were initially scheduled to be deployed in 2012, one year before the Nissan NV200s taxis were scheduled to be introduced. The pilot program was launched in April 2013, and by June 2013, only four Leafs are providing cab service in the city. Still, as of December 2014, the number of new NV200 cabs in New York City remained low.

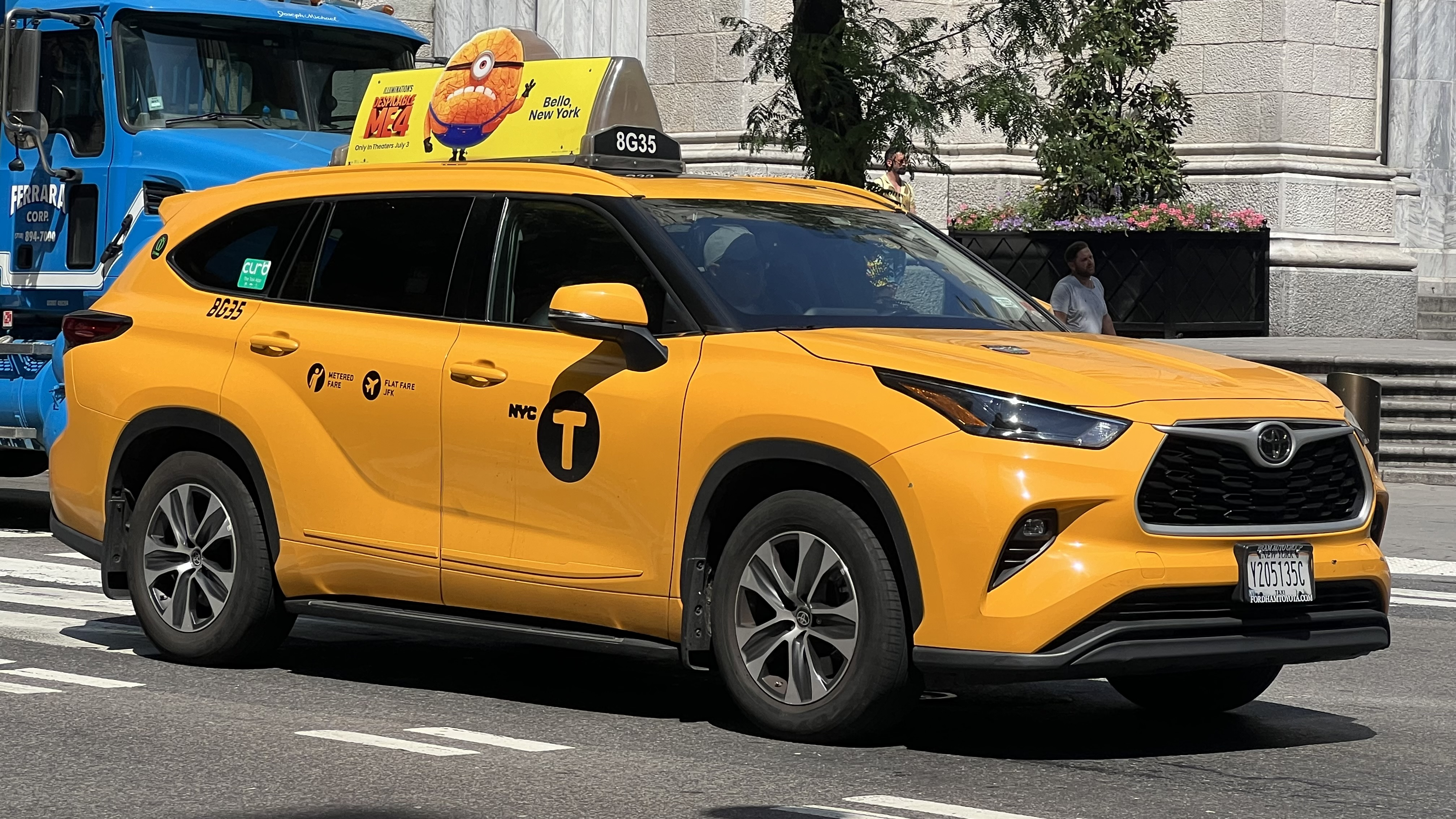
Toyota Highlander Hybrid taxicab

The deployment of the city's Taxi of Tomorrow would result in almost all the existing fleet, of which about 6,000 are hybrid electric vehicles, to be replaced within 3 years with the non hybrid Nissan NV200 passenger van. Only about 1,000 taxis will be exempted for various reasons, such as 273 taxis whose medallions require that they be high-mileage vehicles. However, in early 2013 the Greater New York Taxi Association filed suit against the city arguing that the Taxi of Tomorrow plan violates a section of the city's administrative code because the Nissan NV200 is not a hybrid. In May 2013 a State Supreme Court judge blocked the Bloomberg administration's plan for introducing the Taxi of Tomorrow, ruling that indeed it violated a New York City provision requiring a hybrid option for taxi operators. City officials did not challenge the judge's ruling. In June 2013, the Taxi and Limousine Commission approved an adjusted set of rules in an effort to introduce the Taxi of Tomorrow as scheduled by October 2013. According to the adjusted rules, only hybrids with a large interior of at least 130 cu ft (3,700 L) will be permitted. Taxi operators complained that the only compliant hybrids are prohibitively expensive. A spokesman for the commission noted that the Toyota Prius v is available for US$26,650, about US$3,000 less than the NV200. The two other hybrids, which comply with the rule, are the Lexus RX450h (US$46,310) and the Toyota Highlander Hybrid (US$41,410).

=== Street hail livery vehicles (boro taxis) ===
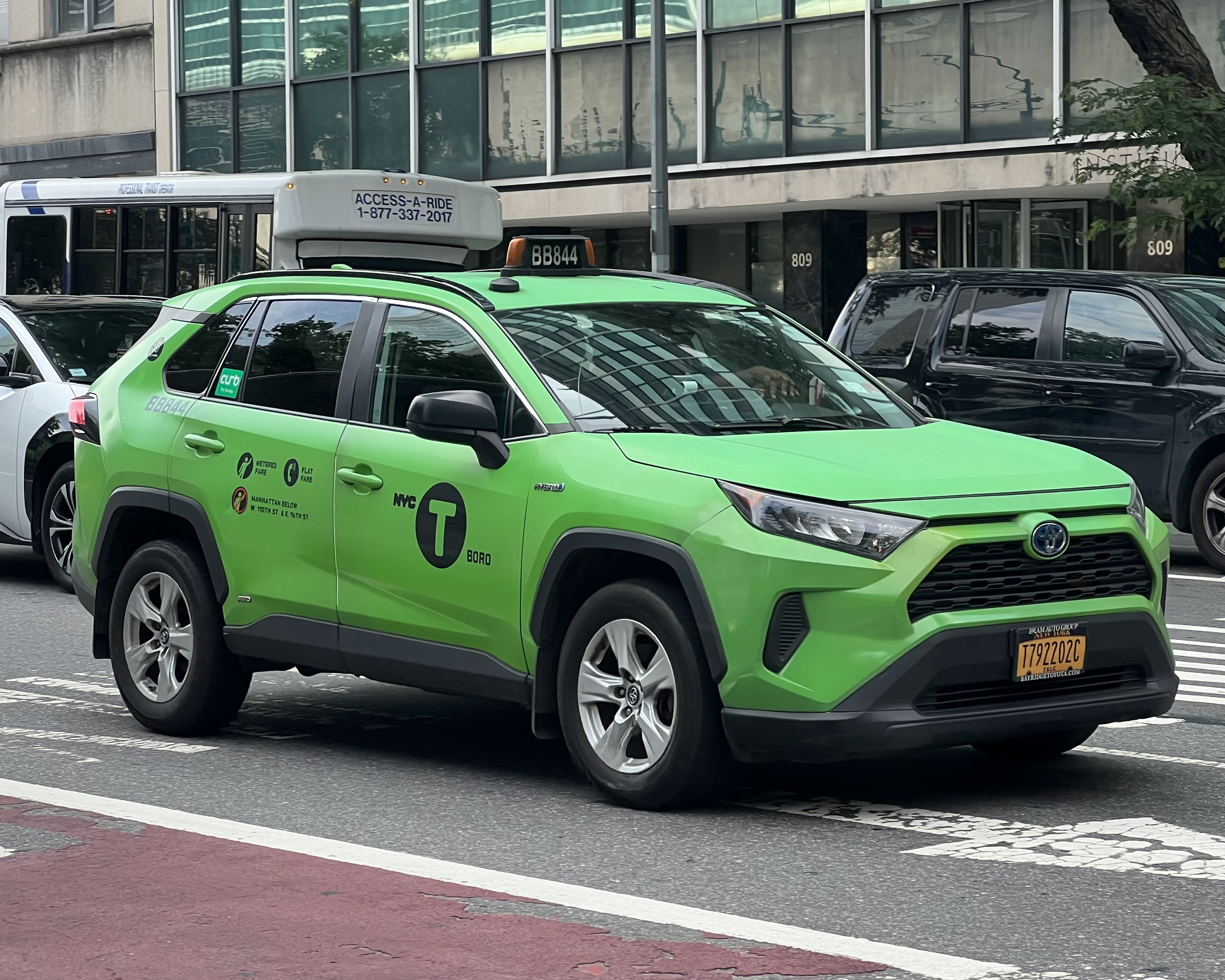
A green Toyota RAV4 "boro taxi"

Historically, only yellow medallion taxicabs were permitted to pick up passengers in response to a street hail. The TLC also regulates and licenses for-hire vehicles known as "livery cabs" or "car services", which are prohibited from picking up street hails (although this rule is less often enforced in the boroughs outside Manhattan) and are supposed to pick up only those customers who have called the car service's dispatcher and requested a car. Following state legislation passed in 2011, the TLC voted in April 2012 to allow livery cabs to be licensed to make street pick-ups in the outer boroughs and northern Manhattan, a rule in effect starting in summer 2012. The implementation was held up with litigation, but on June 6, 2013, the New York State Court of Appeals, the State's highest court, found that the regulation of taxicabs was a compelling state interest, and that therefore the New York Legislature had acted within its rights when it authorized the new class of taxis. The Taxi and Limousine Commission plans to authorize up to 6,000 cabs per year for three years, ultimately creating a total of 18,000 green taxis. They first appeared in August 2013.

Participating drivers must have their car painted and the Taxi logo and information printed, and also the affiliated base on the rear sides, and cameras, meters and GPS added. The GPS will not allow the meter to work if the cab is starting in Manhattan below East 96th or West 110th streets, and in the airports.

=== Self-driving vehicles ===
In August 2025, the NYCDOT issued a permit allowing self-driving taxi operator Waymo to trial eight self-driving cars. Transport rules prohibited Waymo from picking up or dropping off paying riders. The permit expired in March 2026. The Taxi Workers Alliance opposed the rollout of the self-driving taxis, calling the program a threat to their jobs. Amid public opposition to New York City's self-driving taxis, an effort to legalize them across New York state stalled.

== Color ==
The New York City Taxi and Limousine Commission has enforced strict requirements for the color of medallion taxicabs since the late 1960s. According to the Rules of New York City, "The exterior of the vehicle must be painted taxi yellow (Dupont M6284 or its equivalent), except for trim. Samples of paint color and shade are to be submitted to the commission for approval." The specified M6284 paint code is actually a Ford code for school bus yellow.

== Approved taxi models ==
As of 2019, there are several approved models for use as New York City medallion taxis.
There is no restriction on the makes and models for boro taxis.

Model	Model year									
Model	2014–2017	2018	2019	2020	2021	2022	2023	2024	2025	2026
Chevrolet Traverse Hybrid (Revability)								X	X	X
Chrysler Pacifica Hybrid (Revability)	X	X	X	X						
Chrysler Pacifica (FR Conversions)	X	X	X	X	X	X	X	X	X	X
Chrysler Voyager (TransitWorks/Driverge)			X	X	X	X	X	X	X	
Chrysler Voyager rear entry (BraunAbility)			X	X	X	X	X			
Chrysler Voyager side entry (BraunAbility)						X	X	X		
Dodge Grand Caravan Accessible (BraunAbility & TransitWorks/Driverge)	X	X	X							
Ford Transit Connect Taxi Accessible (TransitWorks/Driverge)	X	X	X	X	X	X	X			
Mercedes-Benz Metris Accessible (TransitWorks/Driverge)	X	X	X	X	X	X	X			
Nissan NV200 Accessible (BraunAbility)	X	X	X							
Toyota Sienna Accessible NYC Taxi (AMT)					X	X	X	X	X	X
Toyota Sienna Accessible Rear Entry (BraunAbility & Vantage Mobility)					X	X	X	X	X	X
Toyota Sienna Accessible Rear Entry TLC Yellow Taxi Conversion (FR Conversions)					X	X	X	X	X	X
Toyota Sienna Yellow Taxi and FHV Conversion (Freedom Motors)					X	X	X	X	X	X
Toyota Sienna Accessible (BraunAbility, FR Covnersions, Freedom Motors, Revability, TransitWorks/Driverge)	X	X	X	X						

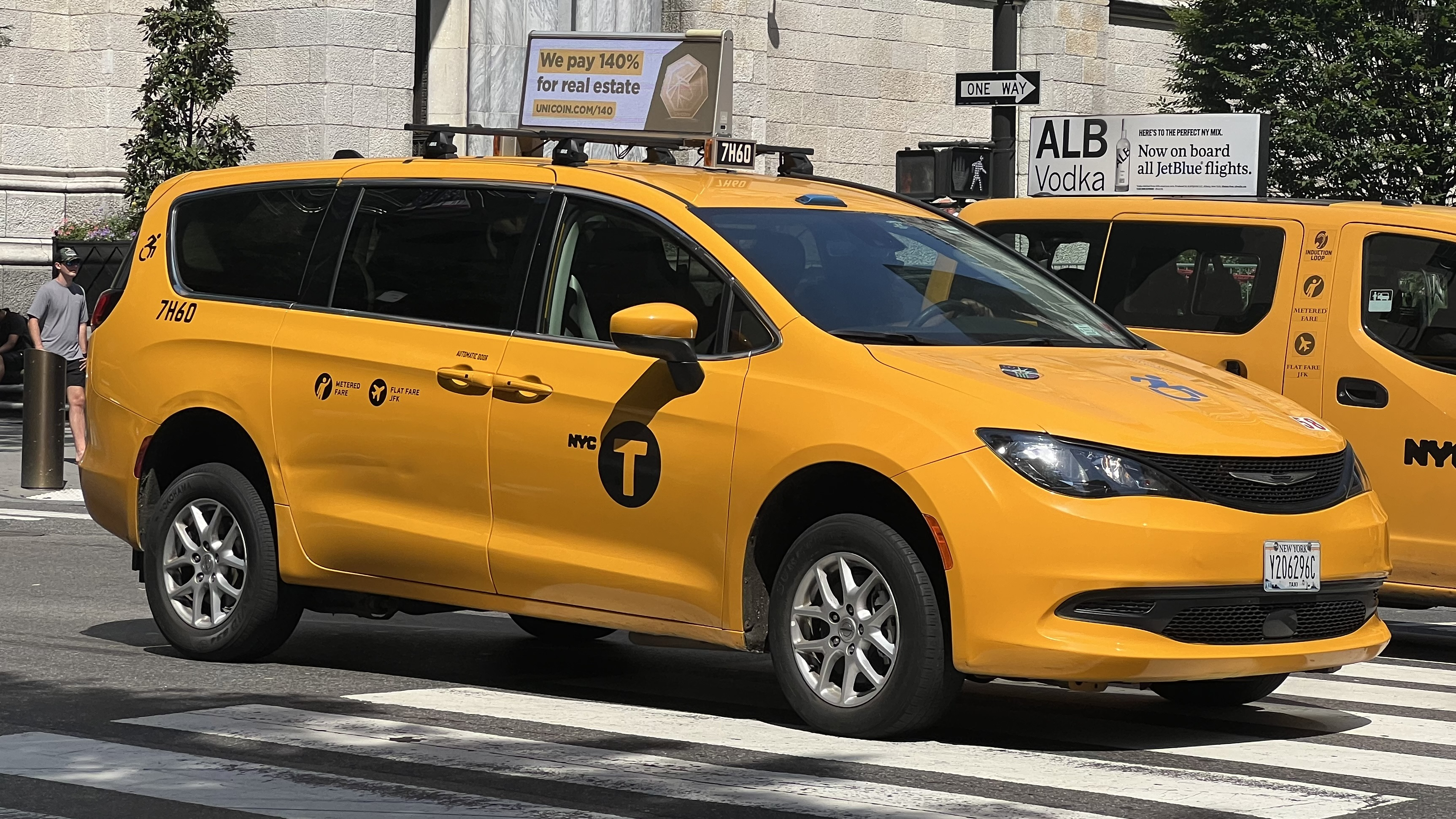
Chrysler Voyager

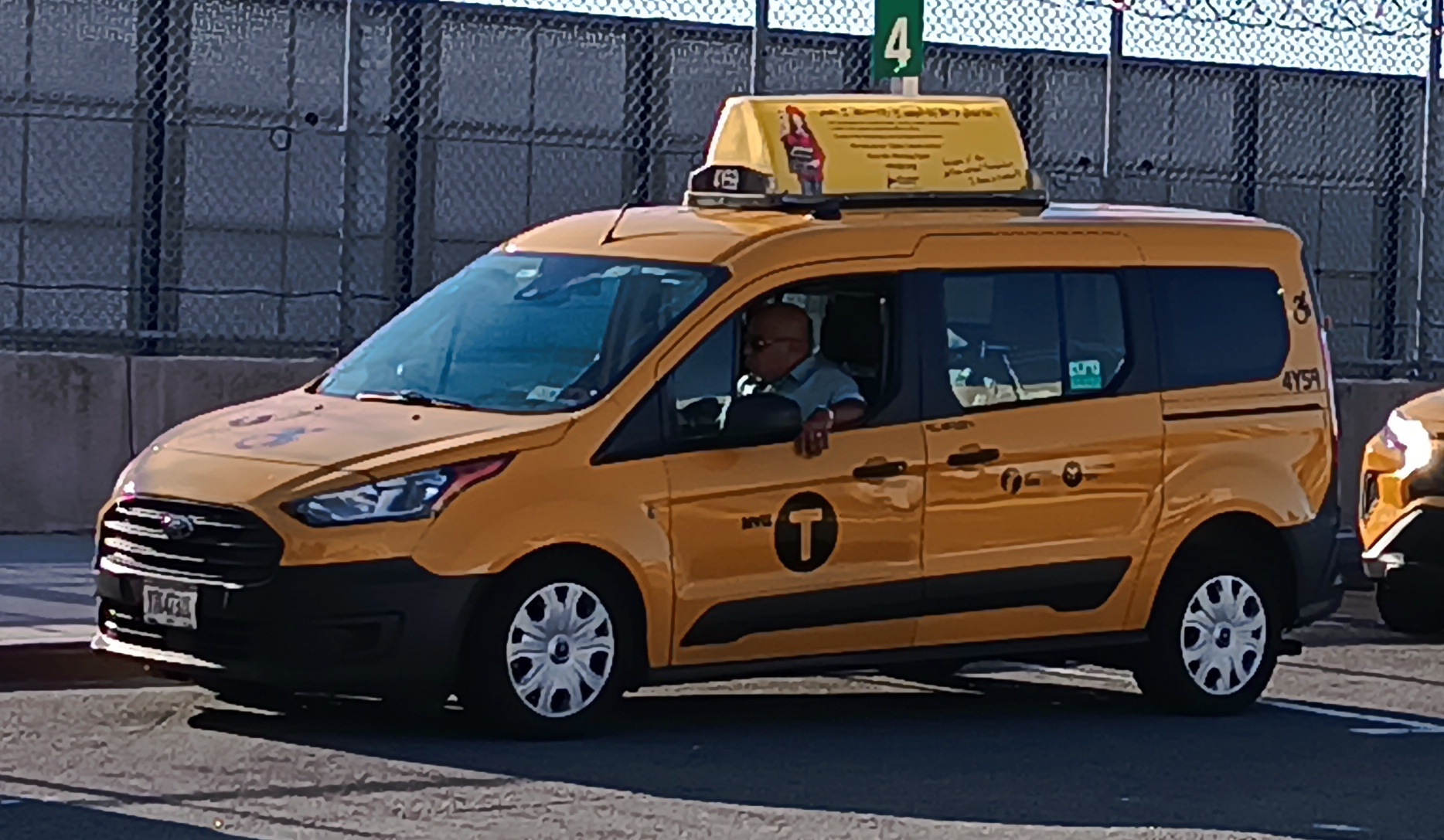
Ford Transit Connect

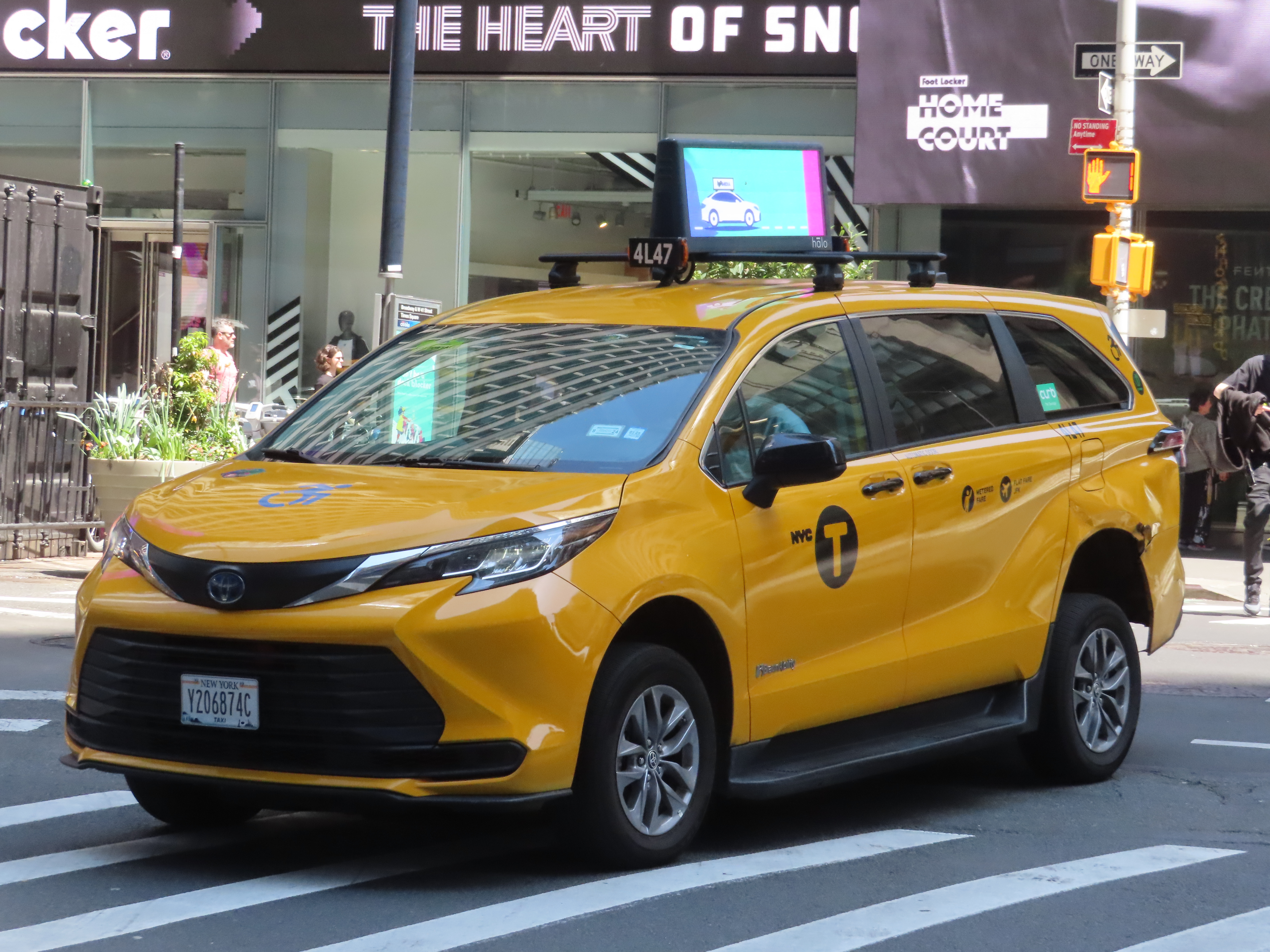
Toyota Sienna

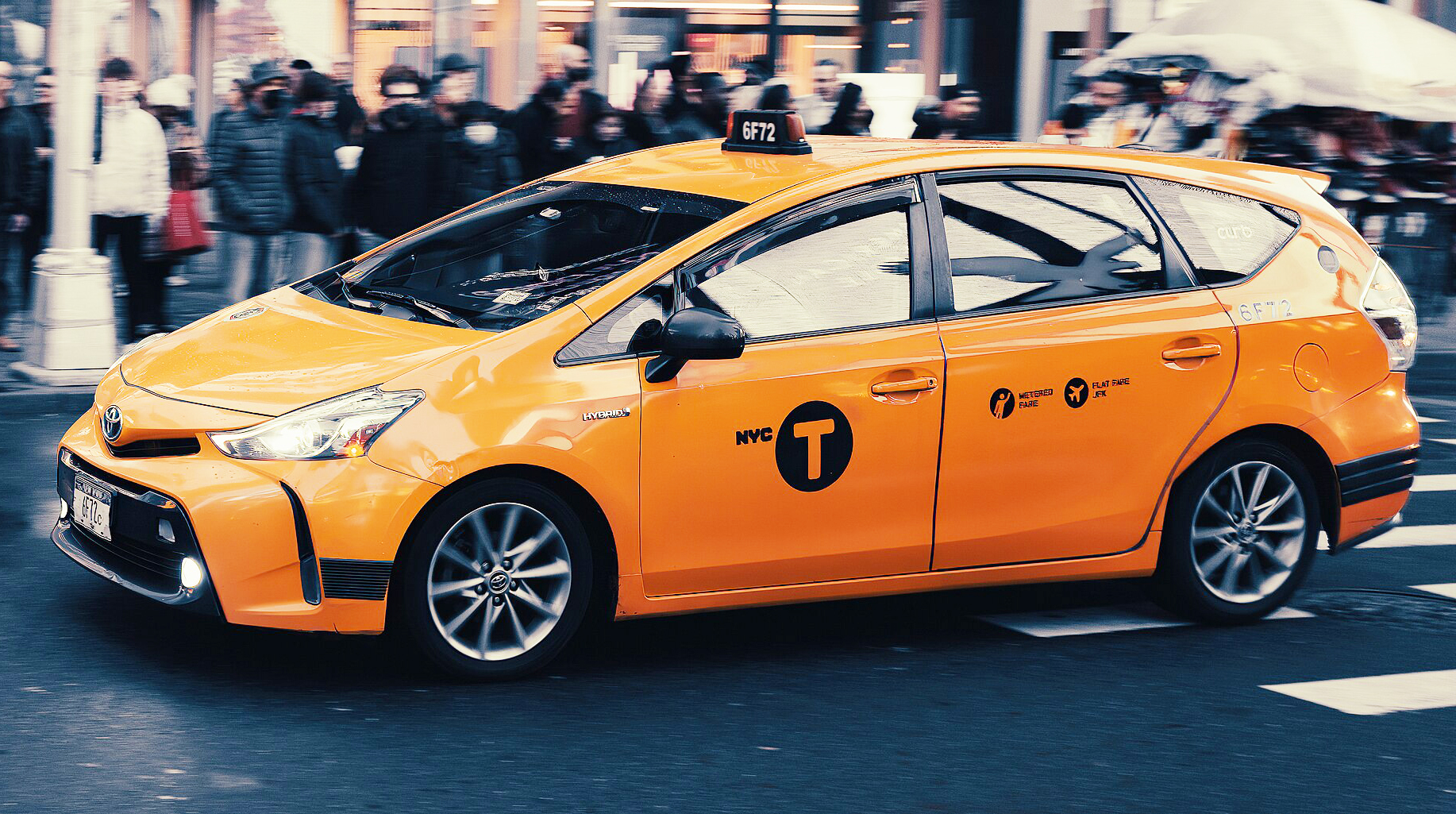
Toyota Prius v

Approved vehicles must have air conditioning for the backseat rows, as well as sufficient space to install the partition behind the front row.

While medallion taxicabs in the city are always yellow and boro taxis are green, car service vehicles may be any color but yellow; they are usually black and are sometimes called "black car" services. Despite the de jure prohibition on picking up passengers who hail on the street, some livery cabs nevertheless do so anyway, often to make extra money. When a livery cab engages in street pick-ups, it becomes known as a "gypsy cab", local slang for an illegal taxi operation. They are often found in areas not routinely visited by medallion cabs, and authorities tend to ignore the practice rather than leave sections of the city without cab service.

=== Crash test ===
As of 2012, New York taxis are only crash-tested before being equipped as a cab. However, the new "Taxi of Tomorrow", the Nissan NV200, would also have its partition be crash-tested while installed inside the vehicle.

== Medallions ==
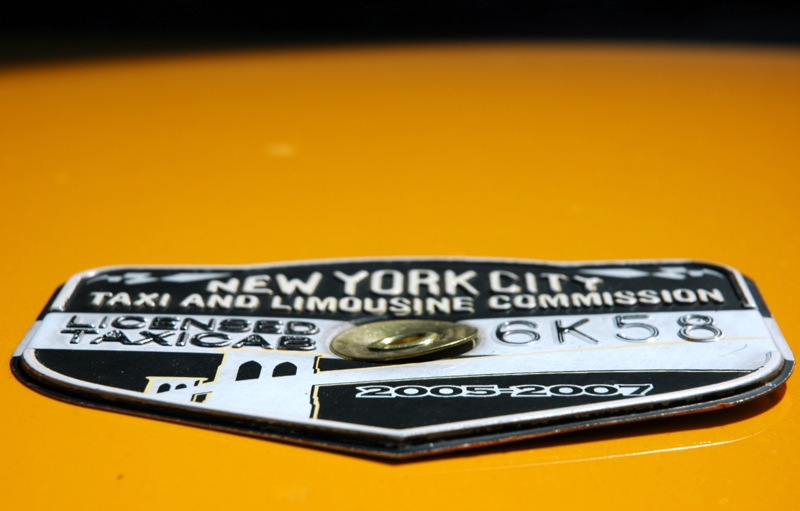
Medallion attached on the hood of a taxicab

Medallion taxicabs are named after the medallion issued by the TLC and attached to a taxi's hood. As of March 2014, there were 51,398 individuals licensed to drive medallion taxicabs. There were 13,605 taxicab medallion licenses in existence. Taxicab vehicles, each of which must have a medallion to operate, are driven an average of 180 miles (290 km) per shift. The average total number of annual taxi passengers is 241 million. By July 2016, that number had dropped slightly to 13,587 medallions, or 18 lower than the 2014 total. However, the number of drivers in April 2016 had plummeted to 30,488, caused by an exodus of drivers who went to drive for ride-sharing services such as Uber and Lyft.

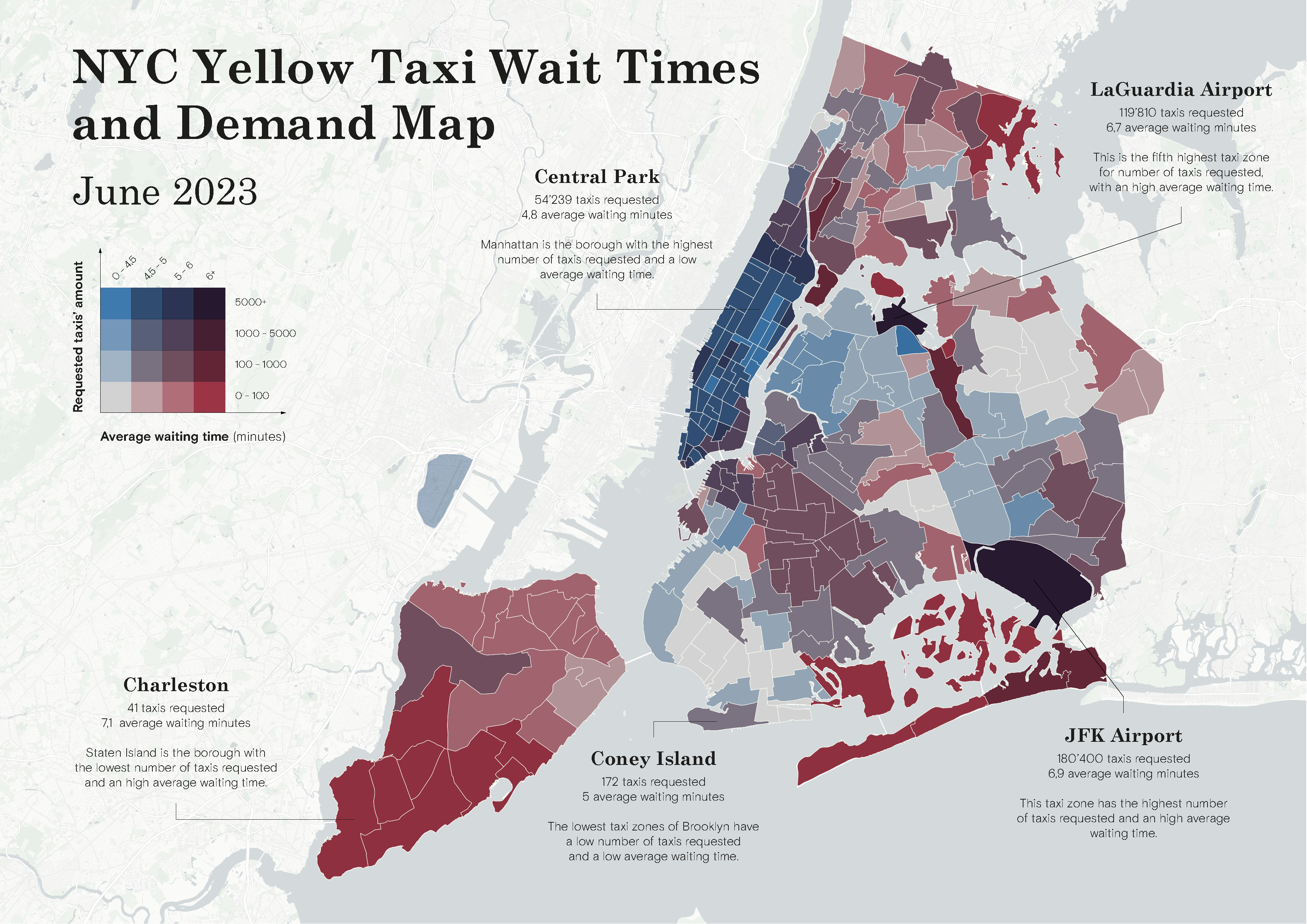
Yellow Taxi Wait Times and Demand Map

=== Numbering system ===
There are currently 13,347 regular medallions, running from 1A10 to 9Y99, and including 136 SBV ("Standby vehicle") licenses, and TLC1 and TLC3. The letter series runs from 10 to 99, then advances to the next letter, skipping I, O, Q, R, S, X, Z. After Y, the first digit advances. Most cabs continue to bear license plates with a variation of the medallion number, but new issues from March 2018 in the format Y123456C with standby vehicles in the format S123456V. The numbers assigned to boro taxis are not medallion numbers, but they are TLC Street Hail Livery license numbers that consist of two letters followed by three numbers. The two letters progress in alphabetical order from right to left: the "AA" series is issued first, then "AB", "AC", all the way to "AZ", at which point the letters progress to "BA", "BB", "BC", etc. The license plates retain the previous numbers as a livery cab.

The New York City Police Department operates a fleet of five undercover taxis. These vehicles operate with medallions beginning with either 2W or 6Y.

=== Logistics ===
Medallions were first issued in 1937 when the city created a licensing scheme, setting the number of cabs at 11,787. This number remained fixed until 1996. Because the medallion system artificially restricts the number of cabs, it has been criticized as an entry barrier to the New York City taxi market that has in turn created a black market for illegal taxi operation in areas underserved by medallion cabs. Because the cost of leasing a medallion is so high, the system cuts into the income of drivers and raise costs for the passengers. On the other hand, some transportation analysts contend that cities with no barriers to entry to the taxi market end up with an abundance of poorly maintained taxis. They say that a medallion system helps the city to better regulate taxis and enables the city to raise the standards of all taxis.

Medallions are sold from the City at infrequent auctions, or by a medallion owner. They increased in price from around $2,500 in 1947 to $280,000 in 2004. The medallions, which could be sold for a $10 renewal fee during the 1930s, are now worth hundreds of thousands of dollars, with fleet medallions topping $1,000,000 in 2011. In 2013–2014, values were around $1 million to $1.3 million. By comparison, in 2004, a taxi driver had an average yearly gross revenue of $90,747 and a net income of $49,532. Because of the historically high prices, most medallions (and most cabs) are owned by investment companies and are leased to drivers ("hacks"). An investigation by The New York Times showed that investment companies and banks specializing in medallion loans engaged in predatory lending to drivers, mainly immigrants, who would be unable to repay the loans with high interest rates and exorbitant fees.

An auction was held in 2006 where 308 new medallions were sold. In the 2006 auction, 254 were designated as hybrid taxis and 54 were designated as ADA-accessible taxis. Between November 2013 and February 2014, the city auctioned 368 new medallions, all of which was earmarked for use with a wheelchair-accessible vehicle.

Over the years, many medallions once owned by individual drivers were sold to large taxi fleets. As of 2012, about 18% of all taxis were owner operated, while the rest were leased; this is a decline from the 29% ownership rate in 2006. Additionally, some taxi drivers might begin their shifts by owing money to the taxi fleet companies that hire them, so they may spend a substantial amount of their day trying to earn a net profit.

==== Medallion values and debt forgiveness ====
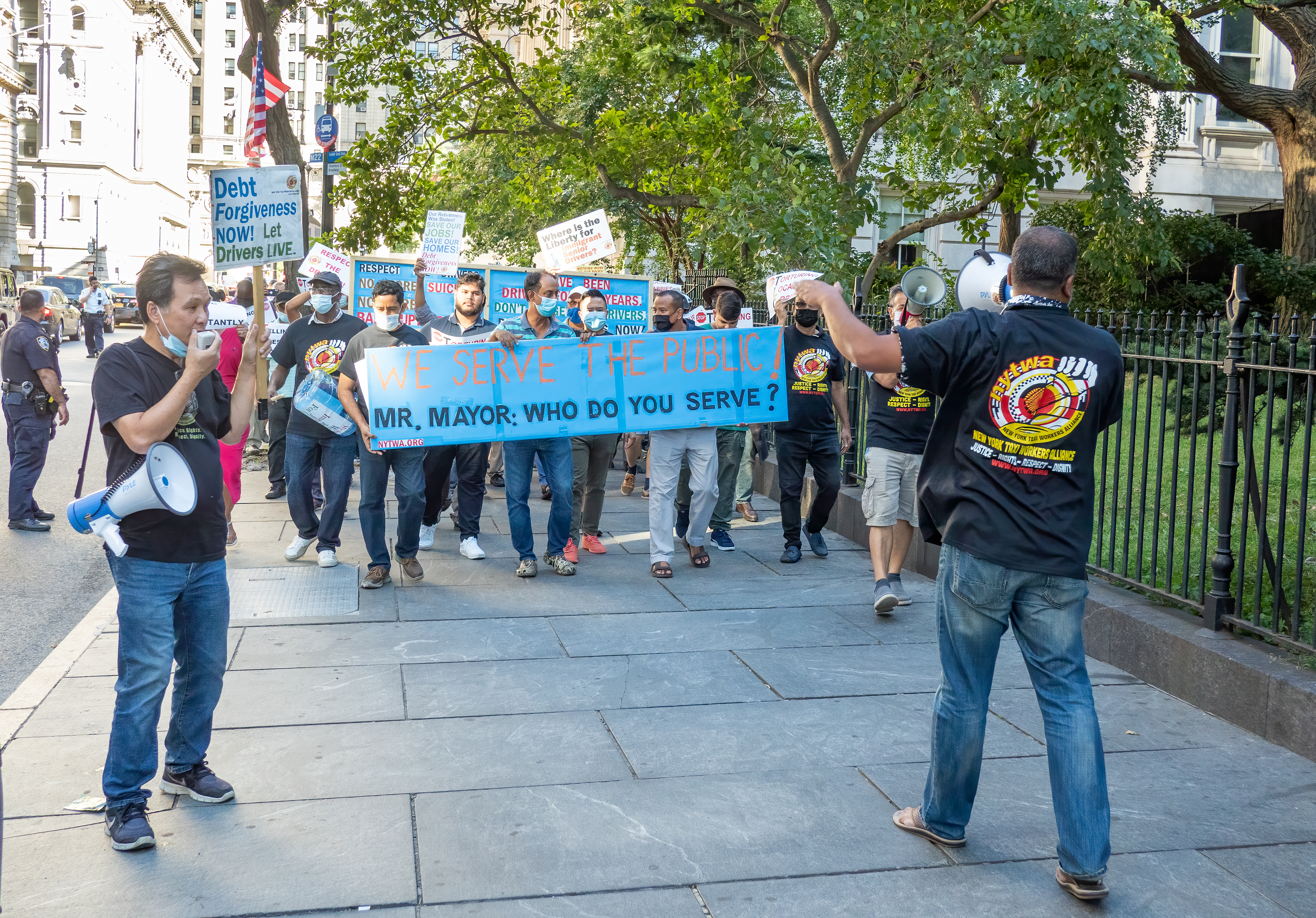
A New York Taxi Workers Alliance protest at City Hall in September 2021

Starting in 2014, medallion prices dropped considerably, likely due to competition from ride-share services. As of October 2016, medallion prices had dropped to around $500,000 in value, with one medallion dropping to $250,000. Because of the decline in medallion prices, many taxi drivers started working for ride-sharing services instead. There was also a decrease in taxi usage: in November 2016, there were 336,737 daily trips that netted $4.98 million, a decrease from the 463,701 daily trips netting $5.17 million in November 2010. However, in mid-2016, after a five-year decline, taxi usage began to increase again. Due to this competition, medallion owners sued the city and Uber in November 2015. By 2017, the 60,000 rideshare vehicles in New York City outnumbered the city's medallion vehicles at a ratio of almost 4 to 1, and many medallion owners faced the prospect of bankruptcy or severe debt because of the low medallion prices, which few entities were willing to buy. Medallion holders had trouble making payments on the loans that they borrowed to pay for the medallions. This, in turn, led to several high-profile suicides of taxi drivers who had seen decreases in profit due to the proliferation of rideshare vehicles.

In August 2018, the city voted to stop issuing new ride-share licenses for one year, as well as enacted a minimum wage for for-hire vehicle drivers. The vote was intended to regulate the for-hire vehicle industry and prevent taxi medallion prices from falling further, but Uber and Lyft criticized the restriction, stating that it would have a negative impact on commuters in the outer boroughs. Marblegate Asset Management, one of the largest lenders to taxi-medallion holders, agreed to forgive $70 million in debt in 2020. Marblegate, the city government, and the National Taxi Workers Alliance agreed in November 2021 to reduce medallion holders' loans to no more than $170,000. 2021 New York City Taxi Workers' Alliance – protesting the debt incurred from Taxi medallions. The agreement ended a 15 day hunger strike that was joined by then New York State Representative and future Mayor of New York City Zohran Mamdani, who participated in the last 12 days of the strike. The city launched the Medallion Relief Program in September 2022, forgiving $225 million in debt within one month.

== See also ==
- Transportation in New York City
- Yellow cab
- Taxi Workers Alliance
- 1949 New York City taxicab strike
- 1980 New York City transit strike
