= Livery cab =

Type of vehicle for hire with a driver

A livery cab (North America), private hire (UK and Australasia), or minicab (London) is a car with a driver available for hire only on a pre-booked basis. These cabs are contrasted with public-hire taxicabs or hackney carriages, hailed or street taxis, licensed to ply streets and for hailing throughout communities. This type of transport may include limousine services and some minibuses and shuttle buses. Livery cabs are a predecessor to and very similar to app-based ridehailing services such as Uber; in the UK such ridehailing services are included in the regulation for public carriage offices and private hire vehicles such as minicabs, while in New York, ridehailing has different rules from traditional livery cabs.

== History ==
The term livery cab evolved from North American livery stables which, in addition to short-term horse boarding, hired out horses, teams and wagons. A 1910 Winnipeg, Manitoba, bylaw regulating transport for hire differentiated a livery cab, licensed for C$2.00 from "street cabs" that were licensed at $8.00 or $10.00. The regulation stated that, "No livery cab shall stand on any of the public cab stands of the City, nor ply for hire from any such cab stand." Later amendments added a prohibition on plying "on the street".

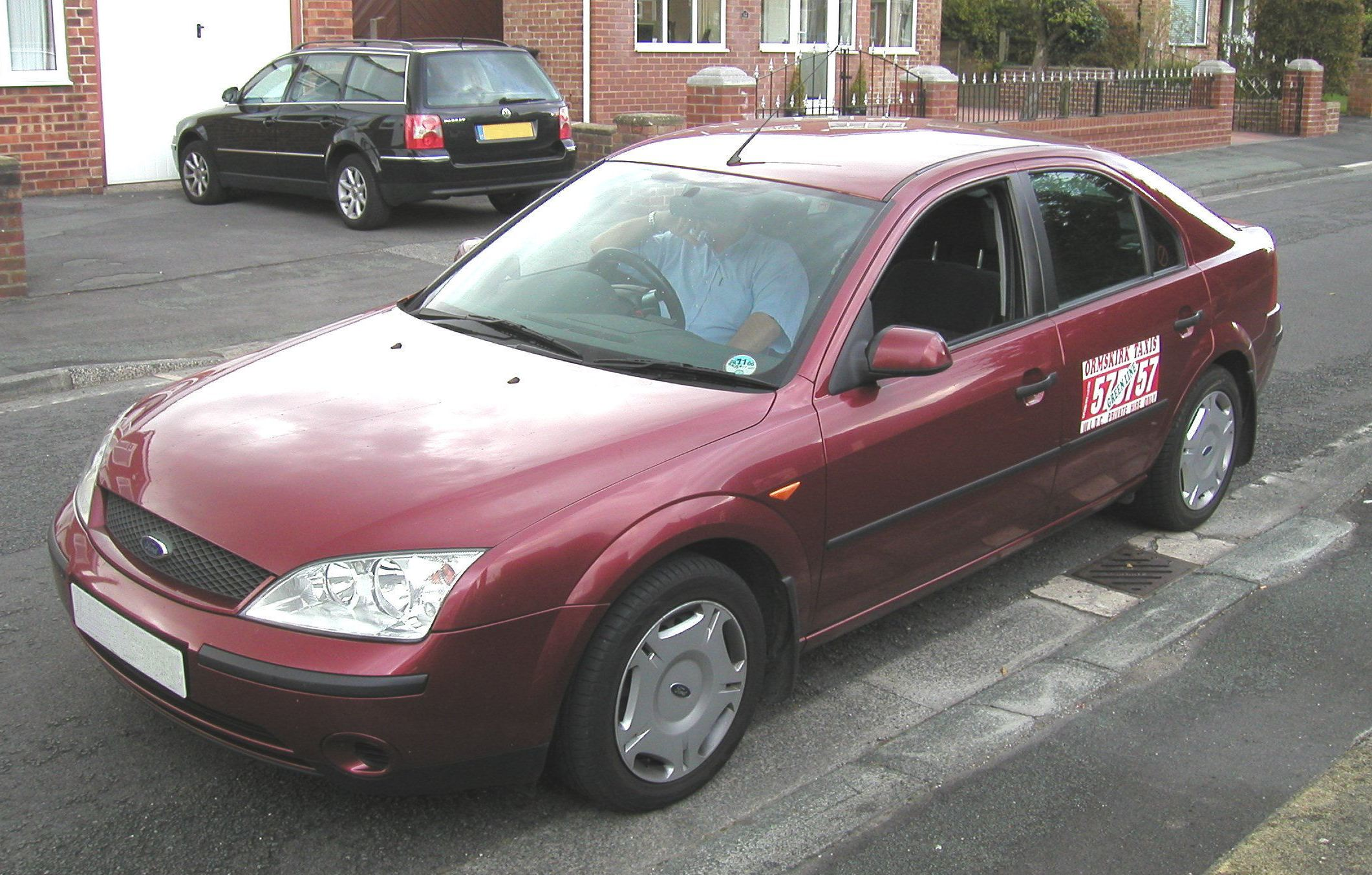
A Ford Mondeo UK private hire in Ormskirk, West Lancashire, with company name and telephone number on each side

In London the term minicab is used, while private hire is used in the rest of the United Kingdom. They began operating in the 1960s in competition with hackney carriages after a loophole in the law was spotted (although in some areas it is possible to hold a dual hackney/private hire licence).

== United Kingdom ==
Private hire vehicles are licensed under the Local Government (Miscellaneous Provisions) Act 1976. Such a vehicle must be booked, for example, by telephone, internet, or fax, or in person at the registered minicab office. Private hires can be booked at the time it is required, but only at the office of a company registered to accept bookings rather than directly with a driver. Private hire vehicles may pick up anywhere in the UK as long as they are pre-booked, and the driver, vehicle and operator are all licensed in the same borough.

Since 2001 private hires have been subject to regulation in London and most other local authorities. London minicabs are now licensed by TFL (London Taxis and Private Hire), or TFLTPH, formerly known as the Public Carriage Office. This is the same body that now regulates London's licensed taxicabs, but minicab drivers do not have to complete The Knowledge, and although they must undergo a small "topographical test" in order to obtain a Private Hire Drivers Licence, they generally rely on satnavs or local knowledge to take them to the pick up and destination. All vehicles available for pre-booking by London minicab drivers must hold a private hire vehicle (PHV) licence showing that the vehicles are fit for purpose; this is updated with MOT tests twice a year after an inspection at a licensed garage. In London, new applicants must send their Topographical Test Certificate along with their application to the PH Driver Licensing Section of the TFLTPH.

== United States ==
In the United States, livery cabs today play their most prominent role in the transportation of New York City. Also known as car services, livery cabs are hired at a flat rate. Livery drivers can accept dispatches from as many sources as they want and drivers can freely affiliate and disaffiliate from these dispatch sources for a nominal fee. Dispatchers do not have the means to exert leverage over drivers; the drivers can choose which road to travel and which call to accept. Like other taxis, but unlike app-based ridehailing, livery drivers themselves accept payments for the livery trips directly from the passenger and often in cash. Around 25,000 livery cabs operated in New York in the late 2010s.

The New York City Taxi and Limousine Commission originally recognized taxi cabs as well as three types of "for-hire vehicles": community-based liveries, black cars (which mostly serve corporate customers) and luxury limousines.

The advent of ridehailing options such as Uber led to a rapid contraction of the traditional livery sector in the late 2010s. In 2018, New York City created a new High-Volume For-Hire Services category for ridehailing companies distinct from the other categories, and in 2021, the added new regulations for these companies.

A hybrid between traditional yellow taxicabs and true livery cabs are boro taxis or green cabs, formally street hail livery vehicles. Typically operated by livery services, these cabs serve areas traditionally underserved by yellow cabs. Although it is illegal, livery cabs will sometimes cruise the street and pick up riders who flag them for a prenegotiated fare, especially in the outer boroughs.

== See also ==
- Vehicle for hire
- Taxi
- Sedan service
- Taxis of the United Kingdom
- Taxis of New York City
