= Boro taxi =

Type of taxicab in New York City

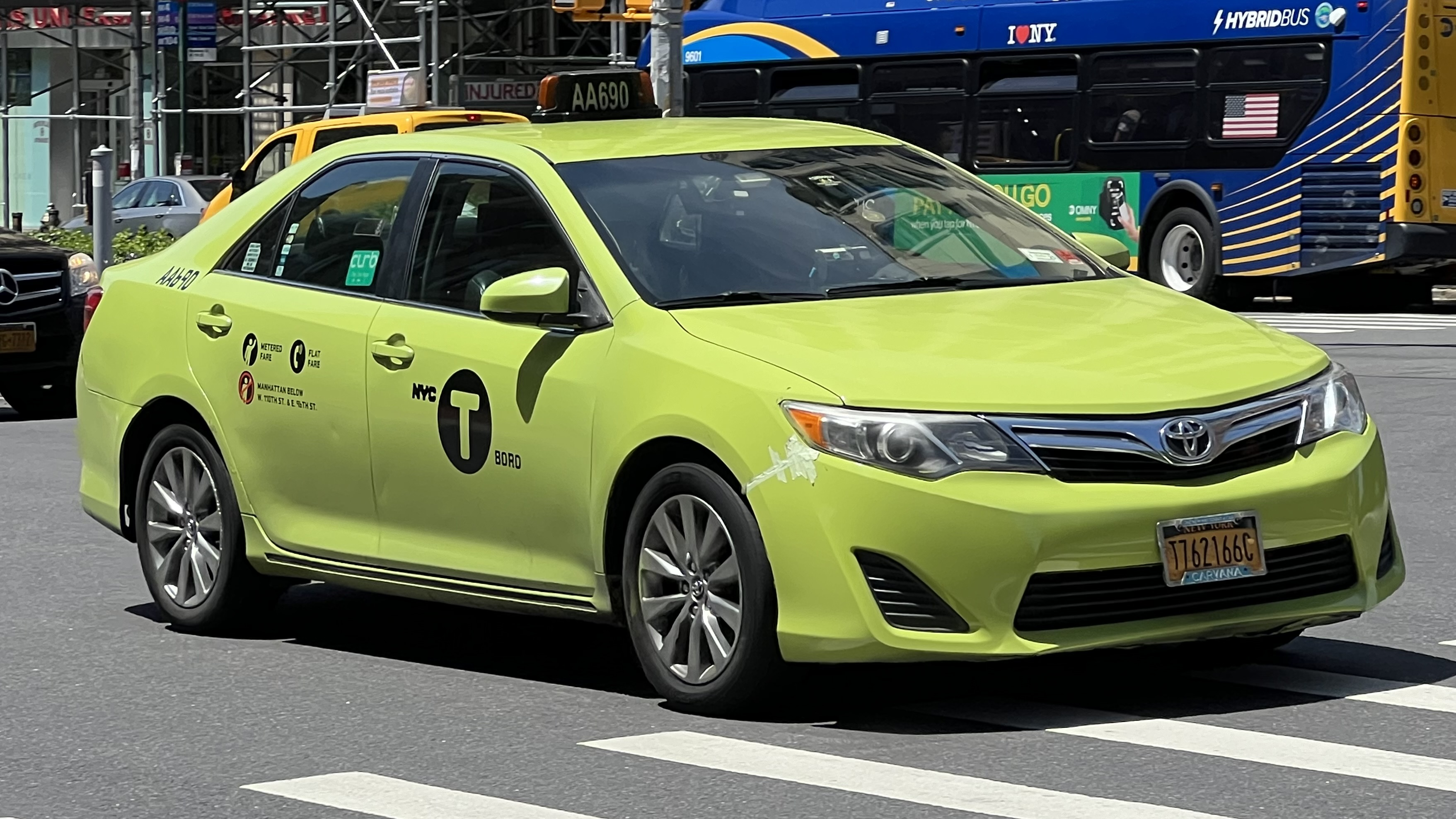
An apple green "Boro Taxi" Toyota Camry in Upper Manhattan.

Boro taxis (or boro cab, also referred to as green cabs and legally street hail livery vehicles) are taxicabs in New York City that are allowed to pick up passengers (street hails or calls) in outer boroughs (excluding John F. Kennedy International Airport and LaGuardia Airport unless arranged in advance) and in Manhattan above East 96th and West 110th Streets. The color of street-hail livery vehicles is apple green (bright green) in contrast to the traditional yellow taxis in New York City.

== History ==
Historically, only "medallion taxicabs", those painted in distinctive yellow, were permitted to pick up passengers in response to a street hail. However, an analysis of trips using GPS by the Taxi and Limousine Commission found that 95% of yellow taxi pick-ups occurred in Manhattan below 96th Street and at JFK and LaGuardia Airports. This resulted in significantly lower access to legal taxi rides for people in outer boroughs. As a result, the Five Borough Taxi Plan was started with the Street Hail Livery program to allow "boro taxis" to pick up street-hail passengers to fill in the gap. Then-Mayor Michael Bloomberg announced the plan in his State of the City address in January 2011.

In December 2011, Governor Andrew Cuomo signed the state law that authorized the Five Borough Taxi Plan which included 18,000 new boro taxi permits and the sales of 2,000 new yellow medallions, all of which will be wheelchair accessible. Although the law would make street hail of livery cabs legal, it was not welcomed by some of the livery cab drivers and politicians due to the fear that the cost would be too expensive as seen in the yellow taxi medallions which are sold through auctions with a then-current average of $700,000 each. The Taxi and Limousine Commission clarified that the boro taxi permit would cost $1,500 and it would be good for three years.

=== Color selection ===
In April 2012, Mayor Bloomberg announced the selection of the color for the boro taxis 10 days after the adoption of the rules governing the boro taxi fleet. The official color for the fleet is a light green called "apple green". The color was chosen in consultation with a design firm to readily differentiate the fleet from the traditional yellow taxis and from the city’s emergency vehicles. The mayor indicated that the name of the color fits to the city's Big Apple nickname. The green color also coincides with green efforts planned for all five boroughs.

=== Court challenge ===
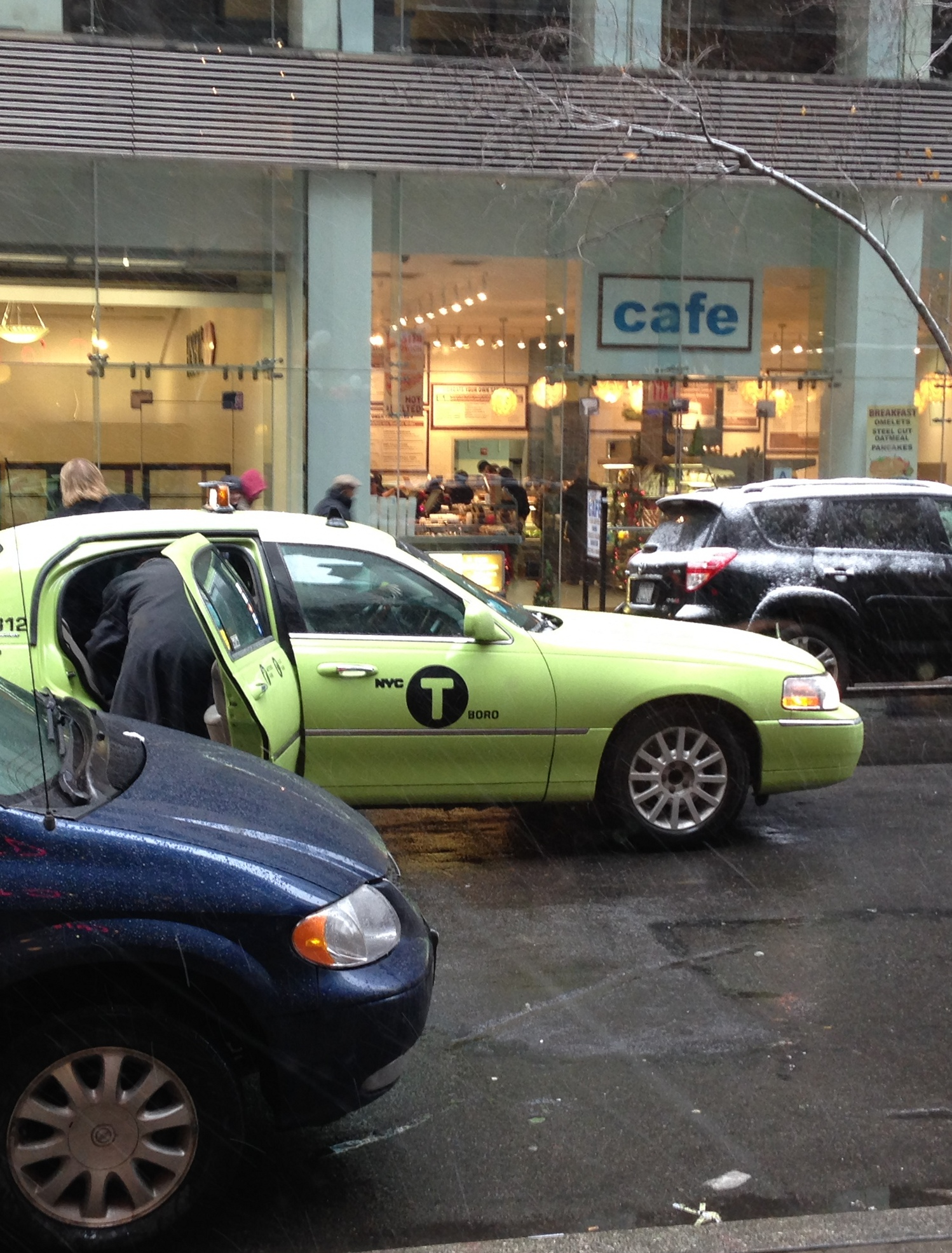
A boro taxi dropping off passengers inside the "yellow zone" in Midtown Manhattan. The boro taxi driver is not allowed to pick up new passengers within the yellow zone.

Following the enactment of the law in December 2011, a state supreme court judge halted the plan in June 2012 by a lawsuit brought by the yellow cab industry. The judge considered the law unconstitutional due to the fact that the legislative actions on taxi services should have been handled by city government, not the state government.

In June 2013, the New York Court of Appeals unanimously overruled the state court judge's decision. The decision had an opinion that the taxi law addressed "a matter of substantial state concern," which justified the state legislative action. Following the decision, the city administration proceeded with the plan to issue the first 6,000 permits in the summer 2013.

=== Phase-out plans ===
By February 2023, TLC data showed that only 891 green cabs were still operating. In May, the TLC began to phase out green cabs. The TLC instead issued 2,500 new permits for ride-share taxis; these vehicles could only carry passengers who had pre-booked their trips. Vehicles with such permits could charge a flat fee and could be any color except green or yellow.

== Services ==
The boro taxis can be hailed in Manhattan north of East 96th Street and West 110th Street, and all outer boroughs (the Bronx, Brooklyn, Queens, and Staten Island) except at the airports, although they can pick up on pre-arranged trips from JFK and LGA airports. The vehicles can drop passengers off anywhere. By contrast, yellow cabs can pick up and drop off passengers anywhere in the city.

The boro taxis are various car makes and models, but they are all painted an identical color of apple green, with standard marking on the vehicles. The vehicles are equipped with GPS, debit/credit card reader, a meter, a roof light and a camera or a partition, in the same way as the yellow taxis are, and the meter fares are the same as in the yellow taxis. The equipped GPS is also used by the city to track and enforce that there are no pick-ups within the yellow zone.

Since the boro taxis are part of the livery services, they are associated with companies (or bases). The decals of base station name and telephone number are affixed on the rear panel of the vehicle. Customers can call the bases for pre-arranged trips. The passengers for pre-arranged trips can negotiate the price, but can only be picked up in the outer boroughs (including the airports) and north of the yellow zone in Manhattan. These airport pick-ups by boro taxis are only allowed for pre-arranged trips.
