= 1949 New York City taxicab strike =

- Date: April 1–8, 1949 (1 week)
- Location: New York City, New York, United States
- Goals: Increased wages; Union recognition
- Methods: Picketing; Strike action
- Result: Strike broken by taxicab operators with no gains for the strikers

Parties
| UMW Taxi Workers Organizing Committee Local 35 | Taxicab operators in New York City |

The 1949 New York City taxicab strike was a labor strike involving taxicab drivers in New York City. The strike was the result of union organization efforts carried out by a local union of the United Mine Workers who were seeking union recognition and pay increases for taxicab drivers in the city. The strike started on April 1, 1949 and was initially successful in shutting down approximately 80% of taxicab operations in the city. However, after several days, taxicab operators used strikebreakers and countered the effectiveness of the strike. The UMW officially ended the strike on April 8. Historian Graham Russell Gao Hodges claims that the UMW's mismanagement of the strike was the primary reason for its failure and states that the strike "did not result in any positive results" for the strikers.

== Background ==
New York City (NYC) in 1949 was home to over 11,000 taxicabs and approximately 32,000 licensed drivers. Several thousand drivers were members of Local 35 of the Taxi Workers Organizing Committee, an affiliate union of the United Mine Workers (UMW). Following World War II, the UMW had increased its unionization efforts among NYC taxi drivers who, unlike workers in other industries in the city, did not have a long history of worker organization. As part of their organization effort, the UMW pushed for taxicab fleet owners to recognize the union. Additionally, they wanted them to agree to labor contracts that included demands such as a standard five-day workweek of nine-hour days and daily wages of $9 for day drivers and $11 for night drivers. Additional demands included an insurance and welfare plan offered by the fleet owners and some changes to work rules, among other employee benefits. However, neither side could come to an agreement, with fleet owners arguing that the union did not represent the majority of their workers. This claim is somewhat supported by historian Graham Russell Gao Hodges who, in a 2007 book, stated that less than half of the 32,000 licensed drivers were active.

By March 1949, the UMW called for strike action if the fleet operators didn't agree to their terms. On March 30, 2,000 day drivers voted to approve strike action, joining 3,300 night drivers who had earlier approved of a strike that would start on April 1. The New York City Police Department made plans for the strike, as a previous taxicab strike action in 1934 had led to violence in the city. The department added an extra 3,250 officers to street patrols in preparation for the strike. On March 31, New York City Mayor William O'Dwyer ordered 2,000 police officers on strike duty. At this time, several operators stated they would not be operating during the course of the strike, with one representative accusing the union of bringing in "goons" from Virginia. (Note: Historian Graham Russell Gao Hodges claims that newspapers reported that over 300 organizers had been brought in from West Virginia.) A union representative rebutted that, while 100 organizers had been brought in to assist the union during the strike, they were not there for violence. That same day, Mayor O'Dwyer (Note: Historian Graham Russell Gao Hodges gives the mayor's name as "Mayor Paul O'Dwyer". However, Paul was actually the brother of William O'Dwyer, who was mayor of New York City during 1949.) hosted negotiations between the two sides at New York City Hall in an attempt to prevent a strike, but no deal was reached. In particular, the taxicab operators refused to immediately recognize the union without a State Labor Relations Board vote. Following this, the mayor spoke about the impending strike on radio where he warned both sides that violence would not be tolerated.

== Course of the strike ==
The strike began at 4:30 a.m. on April 1. By 8 a.m., there were only 701 taxicabs operating in the city, with 76 of those in Brooklyn. As there were 11,510 taxicabs in the city at this time, with approximately 6,000 operating on average, the Brooklyn Eagle reported that the walkout was approximately 90% effective. Shortly after the start of the strike, the union alleged that the operators were giving strikebreakers guns in order to intimidate union members, with a union representative claiming they had an affidavit from an individual who had been given a gun for strikebreaking. Picket lines were organized outside of several taxicab garages, and 9 strikers (4 in Brooklyn and 5 in Manhattan) were arrested for loitering and threats of violence. By the second day, the Brooklyn Eagle reported that the strike was still approximately 90% effective, while the union claimed that 97% of the city's taxicabs were not operating. Also by April 2, 24 arrests had been made, but the expected violence had not yet materialized. Four strikers in Brooklyn were arrested on charges of heckling a non-striking cab driver and causing a traffic collision. Nightclub owners in the city reported a 50% decrease in business due to the strike and lack of taxis. By April 3, the total number of arrests made was 42. Additionally, over 1,000 taxicabs were operating in the city, with operators claiming they had broken the strike and that over 5,000 vehicles would be in operation the next day. Also on April 3, one operator was able to get an injunction issued against the UMW by the Manhattan Supreme Court that limited picketing at their facilities. On April 4, taxicab operations had returned to 40% of their pre-strike rate, and following this, the head of Local 35 resigned from his post. That same day, union representatives informed Mayor O'Dwyer of their willingness to seek an election with the State Labor Relations Board. Late in the day on April 8, union officials officially ended the strike.

== Aftermath ==
Following the strike, union officials accused Mayor O'Dwyer of strikebreaking and abandoning union members after promising them his support, which he denied. Brooklyn politician Abe Stark also accused O'Dwyer of using heavy-handed tactics to end the strike. On the part of the union, historian Graham Russell Gao Hodges claimed that the UMW made mistakes by not offering strike pay for the cab drivers and not contributing more financial backing for the strike. Additionally, the union failed to reach out to cab drivers about their particular grievances with the taxicab operators, such as the lack of vacation time. Ultimately, Hodges claims that the strike "did not result in any positive results" for the workers.

== See also ==
- Taxi Workers Alliance
- International Transport Workers' Federation

== Bibliography ==
- Hodges, Graham Russell Gao (2020). Taxi!: A Social History of the New York City Cabdriver (Revised ed.). Baltimore: Johns Hopkins University Press. ISBN 978-1-4214-3780-4 – via Google Books.
