= Taxi Workers Alliance =

American taxi drivers union

TWA
- Taxi Workers Alliance
- Founded: 1998
- Headquarters: New York City
- Location: United States
- Key people: Bhairavi Desai, Founding Member
- Affiliations: AFL–CIO, ITF
- Website: www.nytwa.org

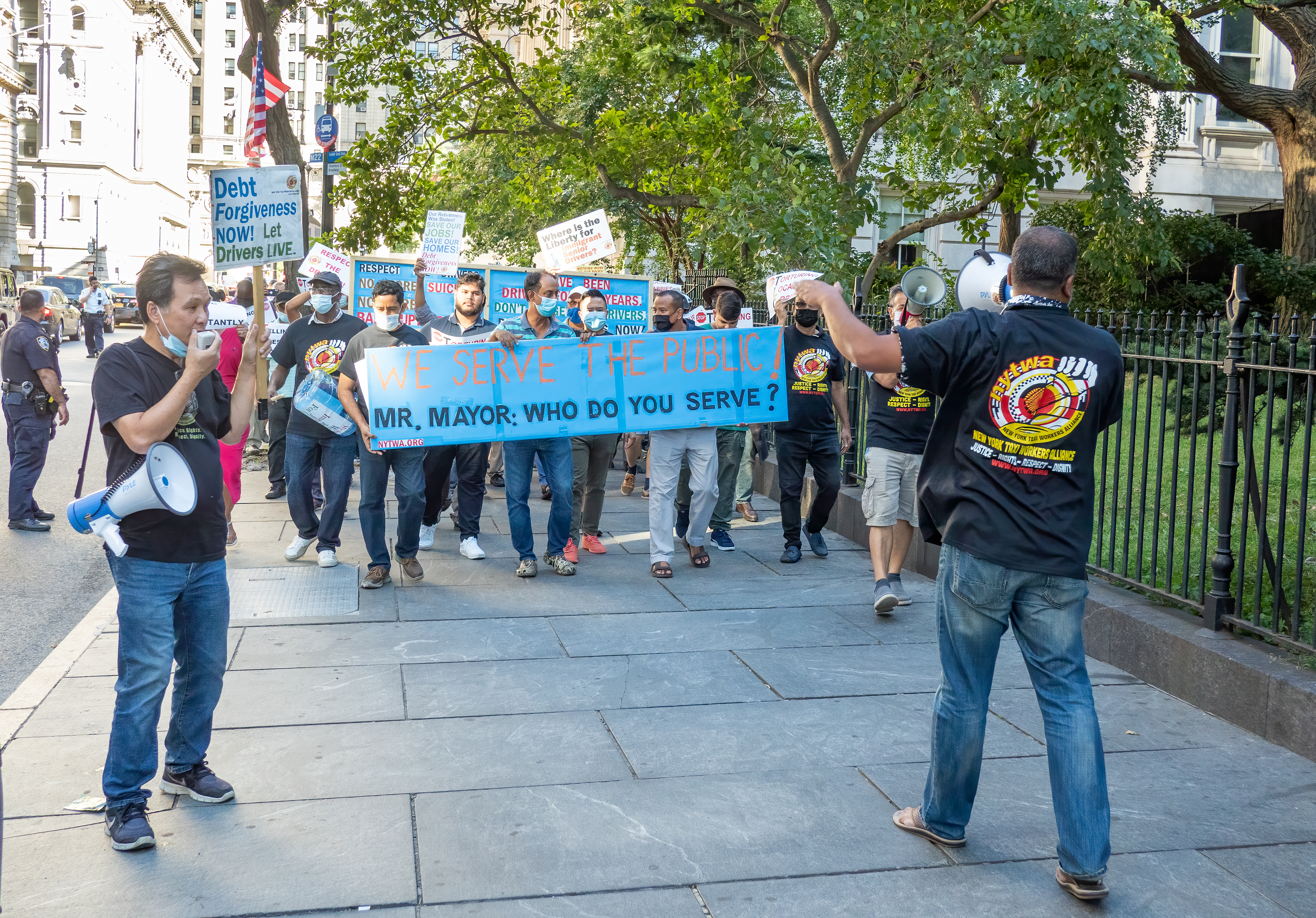
A NYTWA protest at New York City Hall

The Taxi Workers Alliance (TWA) is a United States labor union that was founded in February 1998 by organizers in New York City, as the New York Taxi Workers Alliance (NYTWA). On August 3, 2011, the TWA made history when it became the 57th affiliate of the AFL–CIO. TWA is the first non-traditional workforce made up of independent contractors who don't work for an hourly wage to be granted membership into the AFL–CIO, the oldest labor federation in the country. The Executive Council of the AFL–CIO voted unanimously "to include the TWA into the house of labor with a national unionize taxi drivers throughout the United States". The union is made up of 200,000 taxi workers operating 100,000 vehicles serving 1 billion riders per year.

== Origins of the union ==
The Taxi Workers Alliance emerged from the organizing efforts of the founding member, Bhairavi Desai. Desai founded the TWA four years after graduating from Rutgers University.

In May 1998 Desai organized the first taxi workers strike to occur in New York City in 30 years. Over 90 percent of the taxi drivers joined the strike with a demonstration of 2,000 yellow cabs lined up at 14th Street and Avenue D. Forty thousand drivers parked their taxis and refused to work to protest the city policing of their industry. In February 1998, Desai and other organizers founded the New York Taxi Workers Alliance.

During the 2013 AFL–CIO Convention, Bhairavi Desai, the Executive Director of the Alliance was elected to the AFL–CIO Executive Council.

== Chapters ==
The Taxi Workers Alliance has active chapters in Philadelphia, Pennsylvania, New York City, New York, and San Francisco, California. The National describes its role as helping to "embolden the local chapters". The national officers work to strategize on key campaigns and organizing drives with the local chapters. The national chapter works to secure resources to help with membership recruitment, dues development, and institution-building.

The Taxi Workers Alliance's most active chapter remains the one in New York. Over 15,000 taxi cab drivers are currently members of the NYC Chapter. More than 90 percent of NYC's cab drivers are immigrants, belonging mostly to the South Asian diaspora from countries such as Bangladesh, Pakistan, and India.

== Major accomplishments ==
In August 2018, New York city voted to stop issuing new ride-share licenses for one year, as well as enacted a minimum wage for for-hire vehicle drivers. The vote was intended to regulate the for-hire vehicle industry and prevent taxi medallion prices from falling further.

Marblegate Asset Management, one of the largest lenders to taxi-medallion holders, agreed to forgive $70 million in debt in 2020. Marblegate, the city government, and the NYTWA agreed in November 2021 to reduce medallion holders' loans to no more than $170,000. 2021 New York City Taxi Workers' Alliance – protesting the debt incurred from Taxi medallions. The agreement ended the local's 15 day hunger strike that was joined by then New York State Representative and future Mayor of New York City Zohran Mamdani, who participated in the last 12 days of the strike.

The city launched the Medallion Relief Program in September 2022, forgiving $225 million in debt within one month.

== Long-term goals ==
Currently the Taxi Workers Alliance does not have any collective bargaining rights as they represent a non-traditional workforce. Taxi cab drivers are not covered under the Fair Labor Standards Act which protects workers' safety and grants overtime pay. In 2011, Desai and other organizers were hopeful that the affiliation with AFL–CIO would help TWA build a mass base of workers that could build their political influence and resources in order to one day win collective bargaining rights.
