= Taxi medallion =

American city transferrable taxi permit

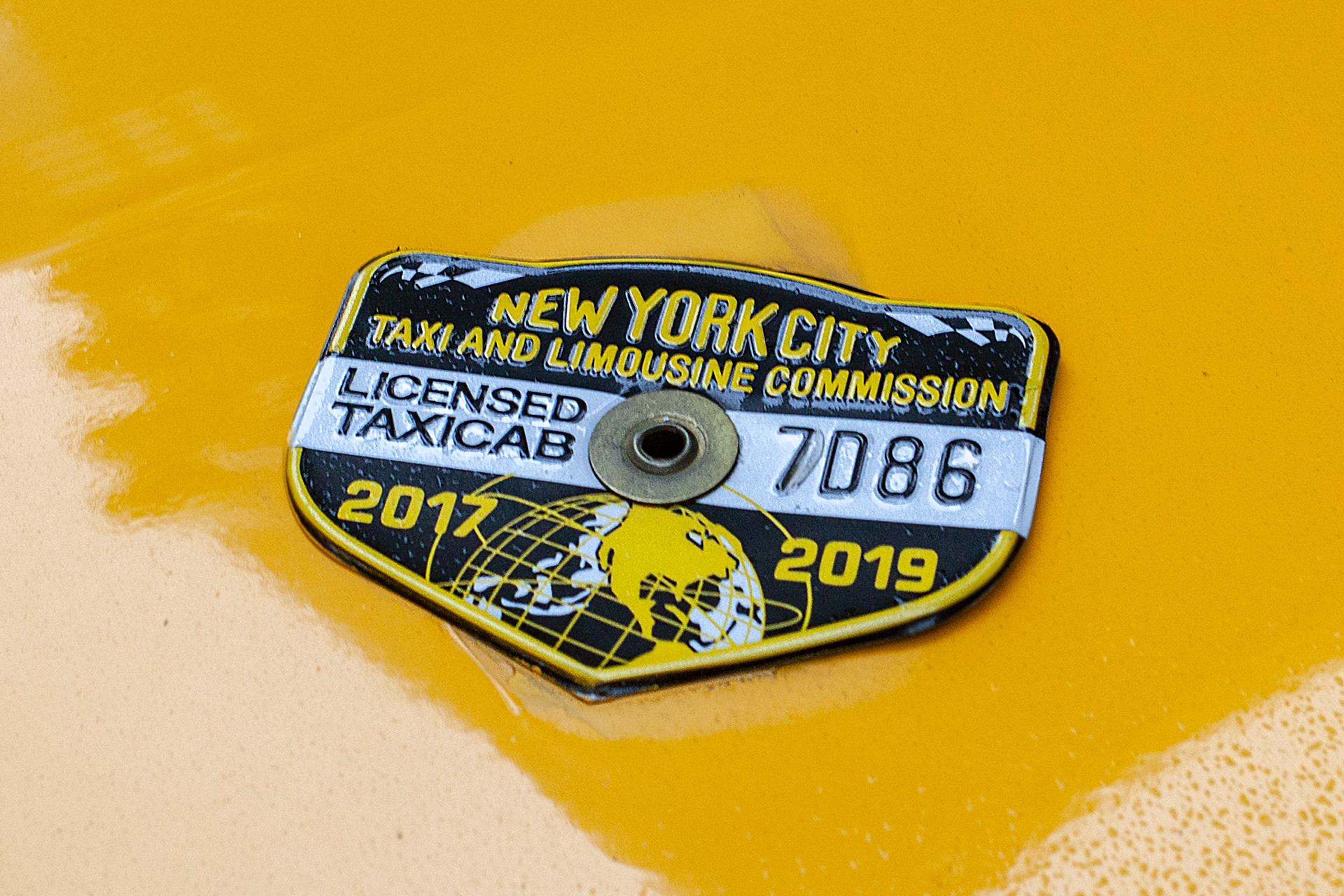
A New York City taxi medallion

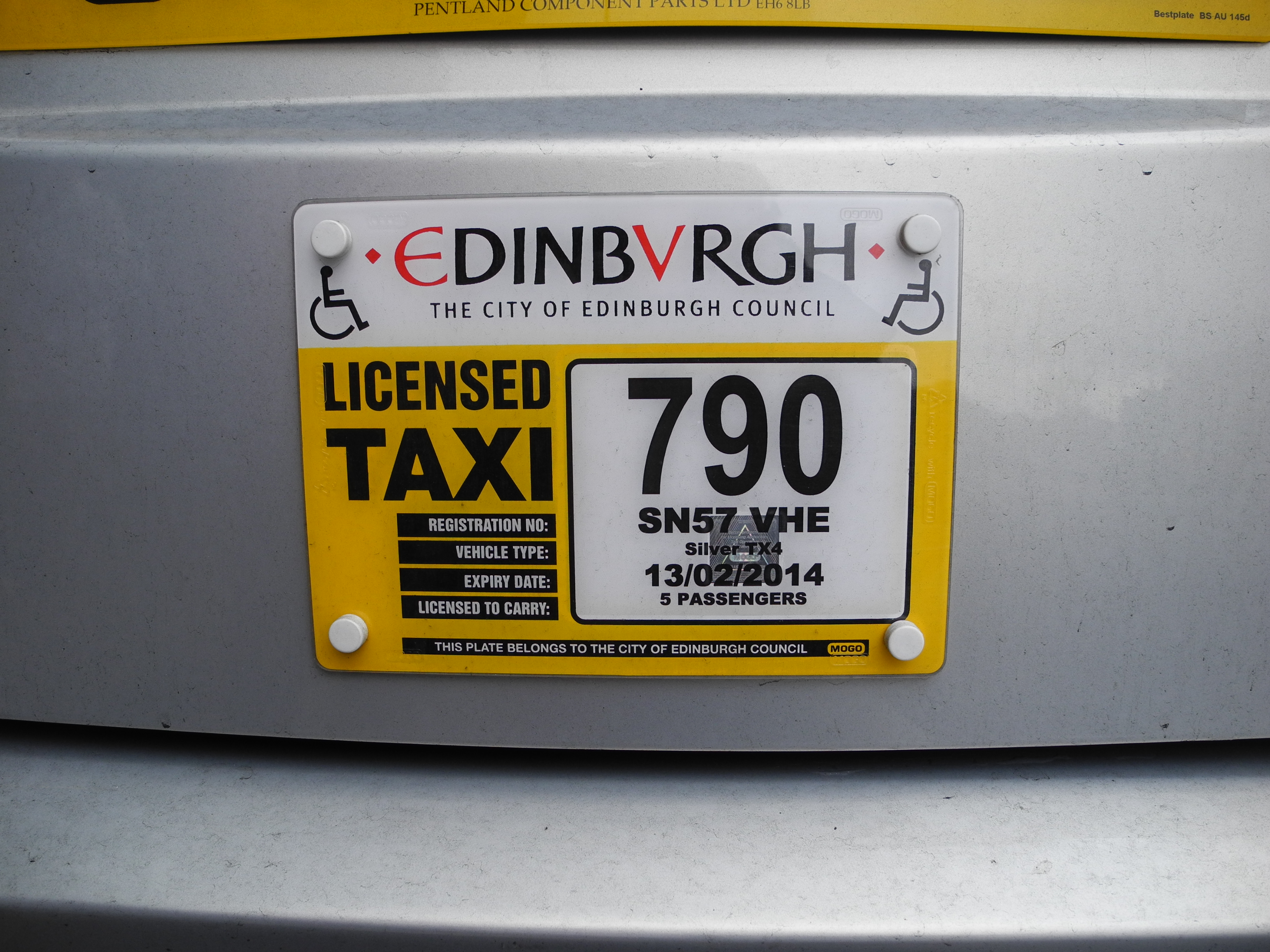
British taxi medallion from Edinburgh, United Kingdom, affixed to the rear bumper of a car.

A taxi medallion, also known as a CPNC (Certificate of Public Necessity and Convenience), is a transferable permit allowing a taxicab to operate, particularly in the United States. Several major cities in the US use these in their taxi licensing systems, including New York City, Boston, Chicago, Philadelphia, and San Francisco.

The medallion system is a government-created intentional constraint on the supply of taxicabs, and because cities have historically increased the number of medallions at a slower rate than the growth in demand for taxis, medallions have generally been considered a valuable investment, though recently the increased supply of cars for hire created by ridesharing companies has been eroding the value of medallions.

== Historical prices ==
=== Boston ===
In 2013, the price of a medallion was $625,000. In 2014, that price had risen to around $700,000. Shortly thereafter, however, medallion prices began to sharply decline. According to the Boston Herald, by the end of 2018, the value of a Boston Taxi Medallion had collapsed; after reaching an all-time high in 2014, prices had fallen to around $40,000, representing a 95% loss.

=== Cambridge ===
In 2014, a medallion was worth nearly $700,000.

=== Chicago ===
The total value of all medallions and assets related to them had a value of $2.5 billion in Chicago in 2013. In 2012, medallion prices ranged from $87,000 to $385,000. In 2015, Chicago's average medallion price was under $230,000, down 30% from 2014. In 2018, they had dropped to a range of $30,000 to $100,000.

=== New York City ===
The total value of all medallions and assets related to them had a value of $16.6 billion in New York City in 2013.

In 1962, the market value of a medallion was around $25,000. The price rose steadily. In 2005, an individual medallion was around $325,000 while a corporate medallion was approximately $375,000. Around 2010, the market value of a medallion was around $600,000. It peaked around 2013 at over $1,000,000. Between 2014 and 2015, New York City's non-corporate medallion price dropped 45%. In 2015, the price had fallen to approximately $650,000. As of 2018, one could purchase a medallion for less than $200,000. On July 11, 2019, 16 medallions were offered at auction, 3 sold for $137,000, $136,000 and $138,000; the remaining 13 failed to attract any bidders. Since many cab drivers took out loans in order to afford medallions when values were high, many have subsequently been forced to declare bankruptcy. In September 2020, Marblegate Management LLC, the largest holder of NYC medallion loans, decided to write off $70 million in debt that indigent cab drivers still owed.

=== Philadelphia ===
In 2005, the value of a medallion was roughly $65,000 to $80,000. As of 2018, the value was around $50,000.

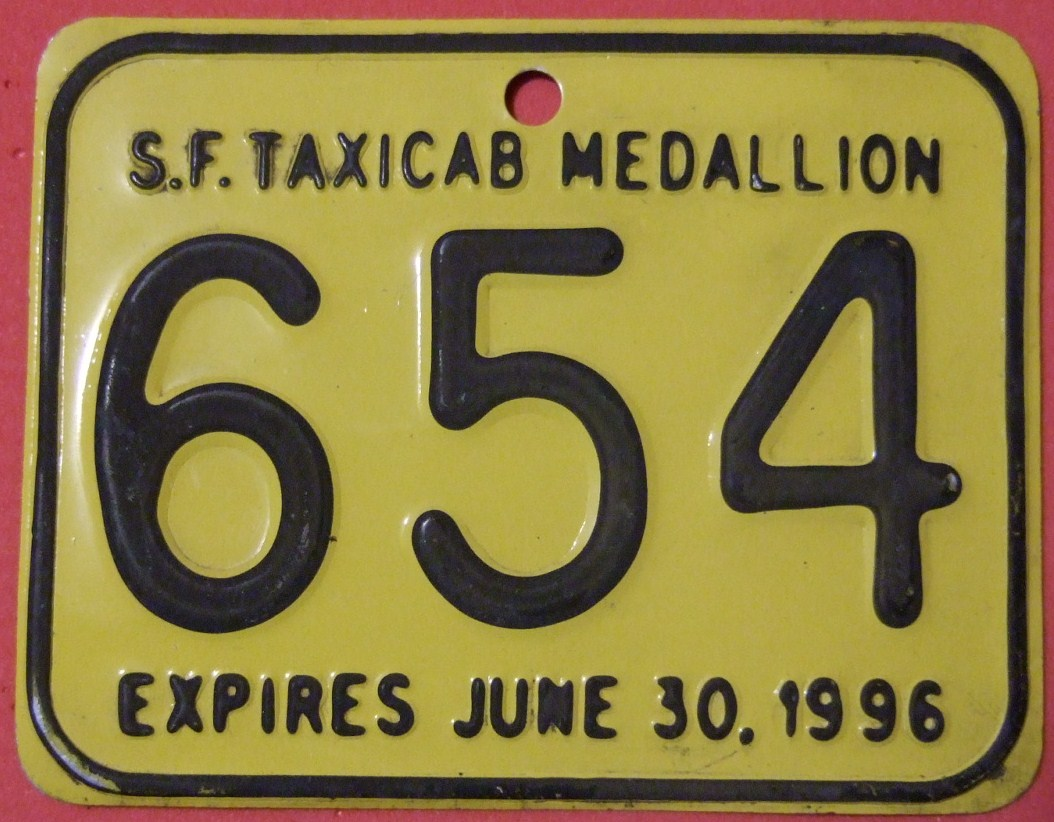
A San Francisco taxi medallion

=== San Francisco ===
Prices were once $250,000 but have since declined.

== See also ==
- Illegal taxi operation
- Taxicabs of the United States
