= Checker Taxi =

Defunct taxicab company based in Chicago, Illinois, United States

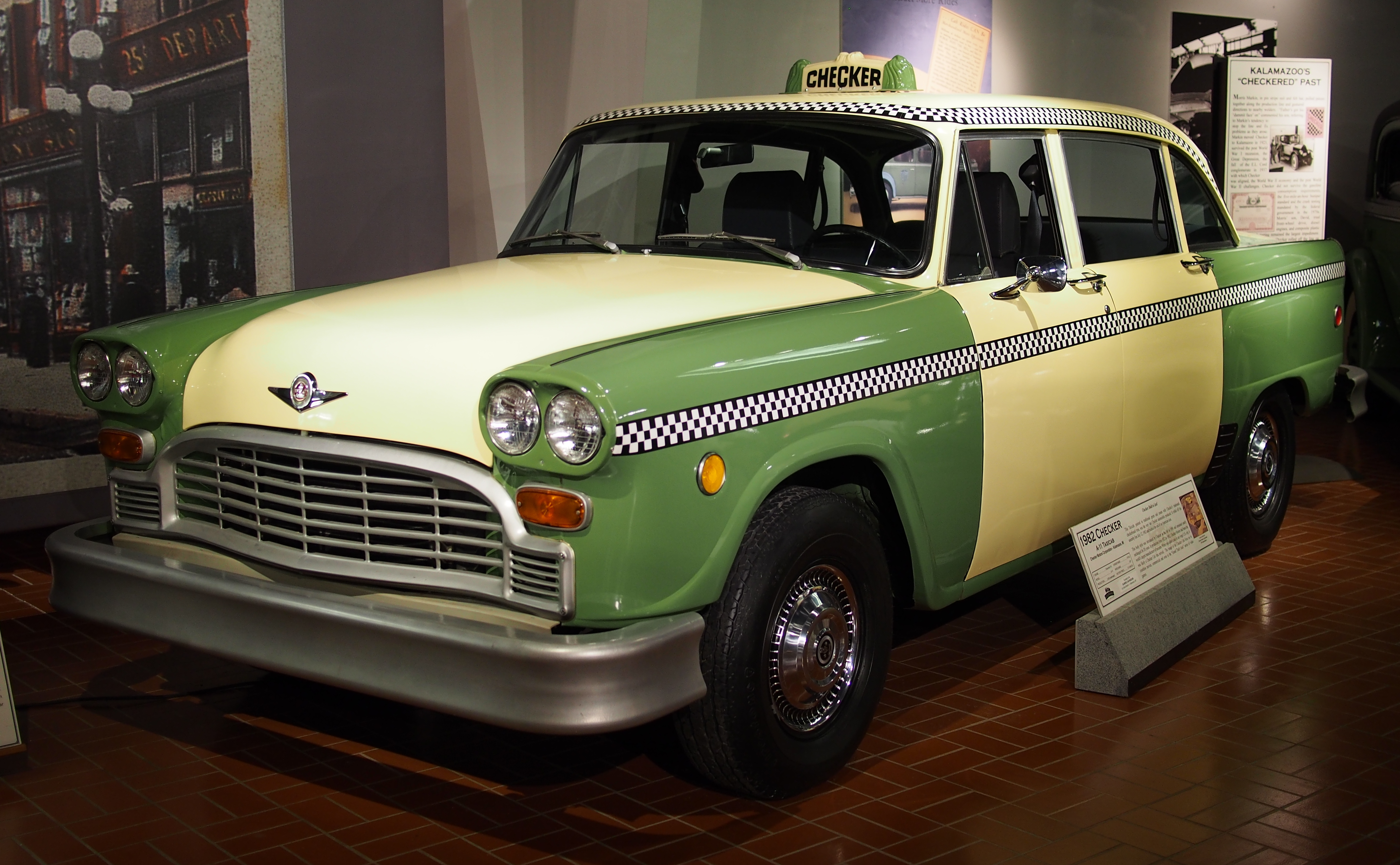
The last Checker Taxicab built, a 1982 A11 in green and cream (Chicago livery colors) with Checker's trademark checkerboard trim, on display at the Gilmore Car Museum in Hickory Corners, Michigan

Checker Taxi was a dominant taxicab company and national franchisor that was based in Chicago, Illinois. Checker Motors was an American vehicle manufacturer based in Kalamazoo, Michigan, that built the iconic Checker Taxicab, sold commercially as the Checker Marathon until 1982. Both companies were owned by Morris Markin by the 1930s.

The Checker Taxicab, particularly the 1959–1982 Checker A series sedans, remains one of the United States' most famous and recognizable taxis. The vehicle is comparable to the London Taxi with its styling, which went largely unchanged from 1959 to keep production costs down.

== History ==
Motorized taxicabs began to appear on the streets of major cities from the early 1900s. Particularly in Chicago, where numerous railroads had terminals, there was considerable need for on-demand, point-to-point chauffeur-driven transportation. Hotels, department stores, and office buildings embraced the amenity, but often limited access to their facilities to a single cab company. Kickbacks were common, and the system favored larger operators, who had the financial resources to "play the game".

=== Commonwealth Motors and Morris Markin ===
The Deschaum Motor Car Co., founded 1908 in Buffalo, New York, was the earliest ancestor of what would eventually become Checker Motors. With new investors, ownership, and locations, the name changed in succession to the De Schaum-Hornell Motor Car Co. of Hornell, New York (1908–10), the Suburban Motor Car Corp. of Ecorse, Michigan (1911), the Palmer Motor Car Co. (1913), Partin-Palmer Manufacturing Co. (1914), and finally the Commonwealth Motor Co. (1915), as reorganized after the bankruptcy of Partin-Palmer. In 1919, Commonwealth moved to Joliet, Illinois.

By 1920, there were two dominant taxicab companies operating in Chicago: Yellow Cab and Checker Taxi. Yellow Cab Company was founded in 1910 by John Hertz who subsequently established an independent vehicle manufacturing business, the Yellow Coach Manufacturing Company, in 1917. Checker Taxi did not own its own cab-manufacturing company, but principally used the Mogul Taxi, a purpose-built cab model manufactured by Commonwealth Motors using its sturdy chassis under a body built by the Lomberg Auto Body Manufacturing Co. Commonwealth's strapline was based on chassis strength: "The Car with the Foundation" used 5 in (130 mm) chrome-nickel alloy steel channel to build its frame. The Mogul Taxi was equipped initially with a four-cylinder Herschell-Spillman engine, later changing to a Buda four. Morris Markin, a clothier from Chicago, Illinois, earned a fortune by supplying uniforms to the United States Army in World War I; he made a $15,000 personal loan to Abe Lomberg and took over the auto body manufacturer after Lomberg defaulted on the loan, renaming it to Markin Automobile Body in 1920.

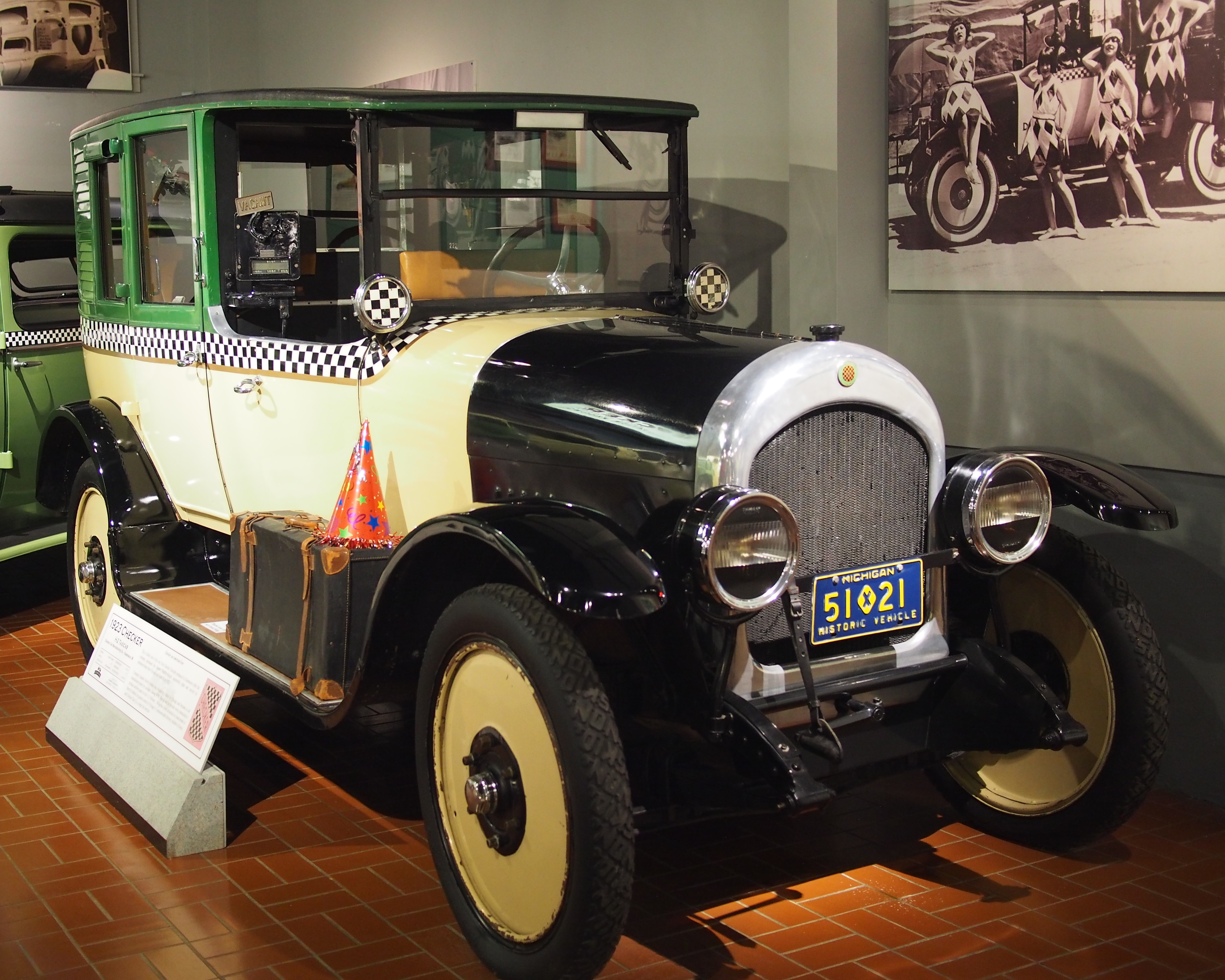
1923 Model H2 taxicab

At the time, Commonwealth Motors was on the verge of bankruptcy, but had an order from Checker Taxi (a privately owned cab company by George Hilsky in Chicago and New York City that had no affiliation with Markin at the time). Markin acquired Commonwealth Motors via a stock swap in October 1921, and merged it with Markin Automobile Body, forming the Checker Cab Manufacturing Co. in order to honor the contractual commitment on 28 February 1922.

For a short period, Checker continued manufacturing both the Mogul Taxi alongside conventional passenger cars; the first taxi under Checker rolled off the Joliet assembly line on June 18, 1922. However, Markin eventually began emphasizing the taxi line after introducing the Model C to Chicago operators. Markin was responsible for introducing the checkered beltline decoration that became the firm's signature design. Cabs were manufactured in Joliet briefly before production was shifted to Kalamazoo, Michigan in 1923, where Markin had negotiated to take over two recently-vacated factories from Dort Motor Car Company and Handley-Knight; the first Checker taxi rolled off the former Handley-Knight assembly line on June 23 or July 15, 1923. Meanwhile, Markin also had lured engineers Leland F. Goodspeed and James Stout from Kalamazoo-based Barley Motor Car Co., manufacturer of the rival taxi Pennant. The sturdy Checker cabs gained the acceptance and loyal following of Checker Taxi operators in Chicago. The Model H was an improved Mogul Taxi, and production continued as the Model H2, introduced late in 1923 after production had shifted to Kalamazoo.

Markin began buying up Checker Taxi operators' licenses in 1924, gaining full control of the company in 1937. Markin followed Hertz's business plan in having drivers open doors for the fares, and outfitted each driver with a uniform. Checker became the first cab company to hire African-American drivers and the first to require that drivers pick up all fares, not just European-American ones.

=== Taxi wars and consolidation ===
Competition for fares in Chicago was fierce in the 1920s, and drivers began ganging up on one another between fares. The fighting between the two cab companies escalated to the point of warfare, sparked by the murder of Frank Sexton, who was attempting to organize taxi drivers. In retaliation, Patrick Sexton, Frank's father, killed Jack Rose, who had been accused of the murder, as Rose was being led from an arraignment hearing. As the war escalated, Markin's home was firebombed in June 1923, which was another factor prompting Markin to relocate Checker Cab Manufacturing to Michigan. In 1925, Hertz sold Yellow Coach to General Motors, which reorganized it as Yellow Truck & Coach; however, Hertz retained stakes in Yellow taxi operators in both Chicago (Yellow Cab) and New York (Yellow Taxi).

The Model H2 was succeeded by the Model E (1924), Model F (1926), and Model G (1927), all derived from the original Mogul Taxi of 1918; the F could be distinguished by its angled windshield and had a landaulet option for the passenger compartment roof, while the G was the first to offer a six-cylinder Buda engine as an option to the four-cylinder Buda previously offered. Finally breaking from the Mogul Taxi ancestor, Checker introduced the Model K in October 1928, riding on a 127 in (3,200 mm) wheelbase and powered by a 6-cylinder Buda.

Hertz had sold the controlling interest in his Yellow Cab Company to the Parmelee Transportation Company, but in 1929, after a suspicious fire at his stables killed his prized race horses, Hertz sold his remaining shares of Yellow Cab to Markin, who subsequently acquired another one-third in the company from Parmelee, thus taking control of both Parmelee and Yellow Cab. The Model K was succeeded by the Model M (1930) and the Model T (1932); the Model T was badge engineered and sold as the Auburn Saf-T-Cab in 1933. In 1940, Parmelee (including Yellow and Checker Cab) became the largest cab company in the United States.

GM had wanted to sell part of the acquired Yellow Coach business and made an offer to Markin, but Markin declined. Rather than eliminate the capacity of Yellow Coach, General Motors entered the taxicab business in New York City as Terminal Taxi Cab. General Motors operated Yellow Coach as a subsidiary until 1943, at which time the company was merged with GMC Truck Division, and manufacturing shifted from Chicago to Pontiac, Michigan.

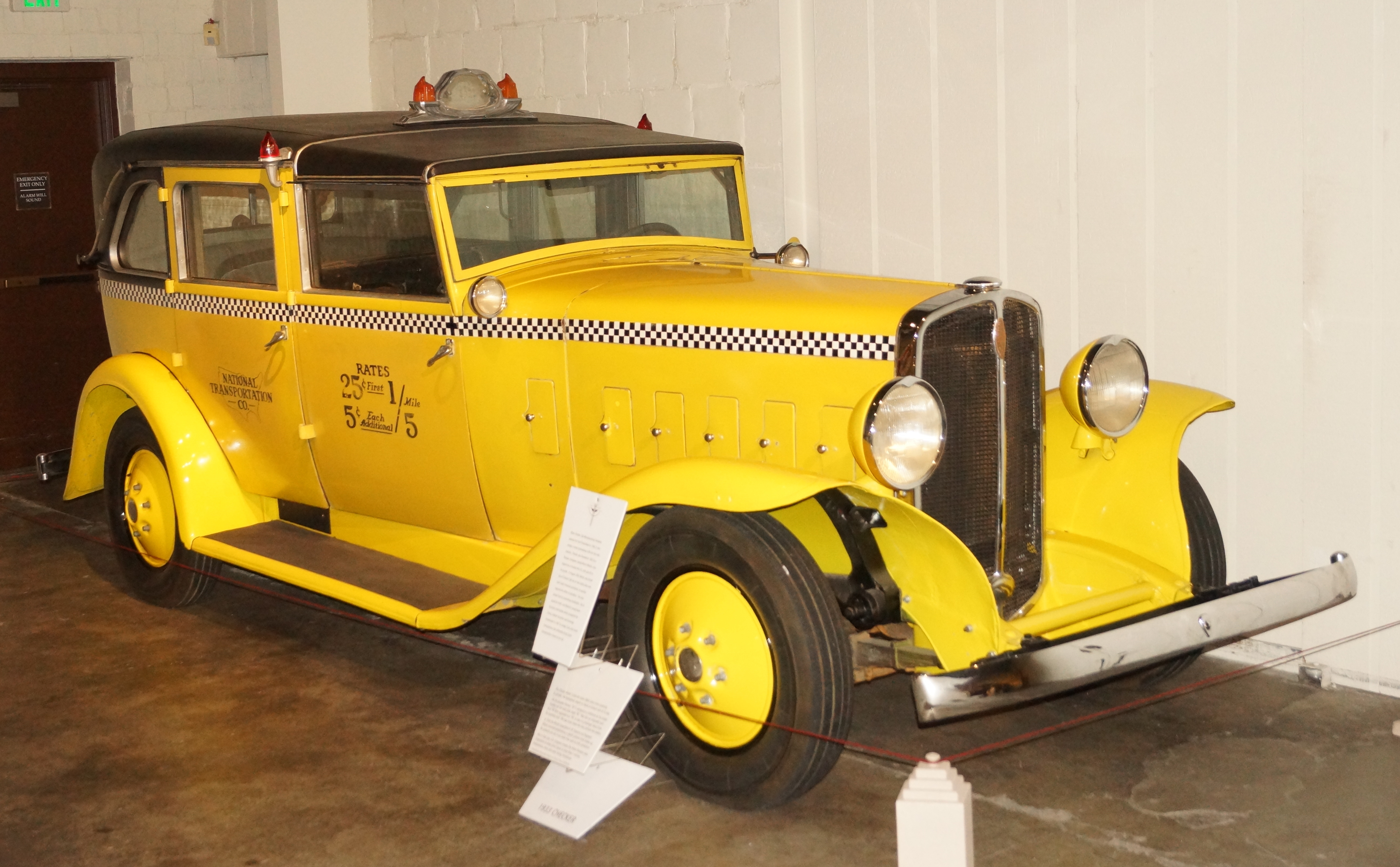
1933 Model T taxicab

A second "taxi war" broke out in the early 1930s, with Checker Taxi Co and Terminal Taxi Co operators fighting it out in New York City. GM flooded the market with its "General Cab", offered to taxi operators for US$360 down and no contract; predictably, drivers took advantage of the generous terms, deferring maintenance and delaying their monthly repayments until they turned the cars back in to GM in various states of disrepair. To end the dispute, New York Mayor Jimmy Walker created the New York Taxi Cab Commission (now called the New York City Taxi and Limousine Commission), which issued a limited number of cab operator permits, called taxi medallions, and mandated that cabs have seating for five passengers in the rear compartment, which favored Checker and a handful of other manufacturers that built automobiles which met this requirement. Over the next three decades, Markin was involved in the formation of "Checker Taxi" or "Checker Cab" companies in several major U.S. cities.

In August 1933, Markin sold Checker Cab Manufacturing to Errett Lobban Cord, but bought it back again in 1936. Markin and Cord were friends, and after Cord bought up interest in Checker, he retained Markin as company head. Meanwhile, the large, heavy Checker Model T, introduced in 1932, featured an 8-cylinder Lycoming engine, the same one that powered the classic Cords at the time. Checker had used Lycoming 6-cylinder engines since the introduction of the Checker Model G in 1927. Prior to that, most Checkers had been powered by 4-cylinder Buda engines.

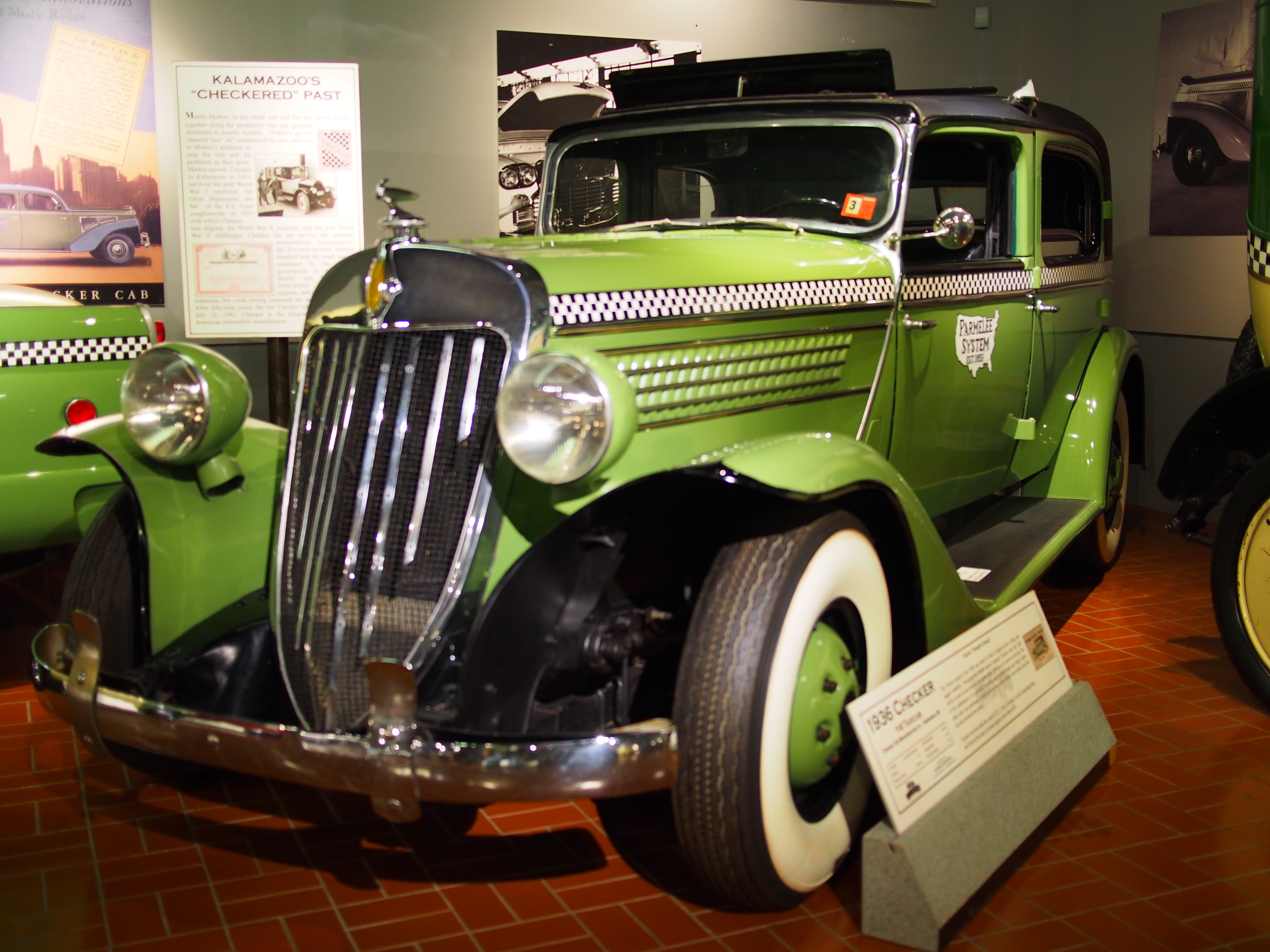
1936 Model Y taxicab

The 1935 Checker Model Y featured attractive front end styling reminiscent of its contemporary concern sibling, the Auburn. This also used the same Lycoming GFD 8 straight-eight engine as installed in the Auburn. A lower-cost model with a six-cylinder Continental engine arrived in the latter half of 1936. The Y continued in production until 1939. In 1939, Checker introduced a brand new model, the Model A. From that point forward, all Checkers would carry the Model "A" designation, usually with a number.

The 1939 Model A featured a patented landaulet, which was a retractable roof section at the very back of the greenhouse; this allowed the rear roof to be opened if passengers desired an open-air ride. In addition, it had distinctive stylized headlight lenses and unusual open-sided front fenders. The open-sided fenders in front detracted from the car's styling but made fender repairs easier for fleet owners. Beginning in 1936 and becoming standard fitment in 1939, Checkers were powered by the well-known Continental "Red Seal" inline six-cylinder engine, until that engine was discontinued in 1964. Starting in the 1950s, Checker offered an optional overhead valve version of the Continental six.

=== Post-war dominance ===
During WWII, Checker, like other American automakers, switched to wartime production, building material needed by the U.S. Armed Forces. After the war, Checker developed multiple models that were never sold, including the Model B (rear-engine, rear-wheel drive with two prototypes built), Model C (never built), and the Model D (a front-wheel drive chassis with transverse six-cylinder engine). Checker made the decision to revive the Model A, mechanically similar to the pre-war models with contemporary styling derived from the Model D. The resulting new Model A2, introduced in 1947, had a 127-inch (3,226 mm) wheelbase and featured unit body construction. This basic design continued in production until 1956.

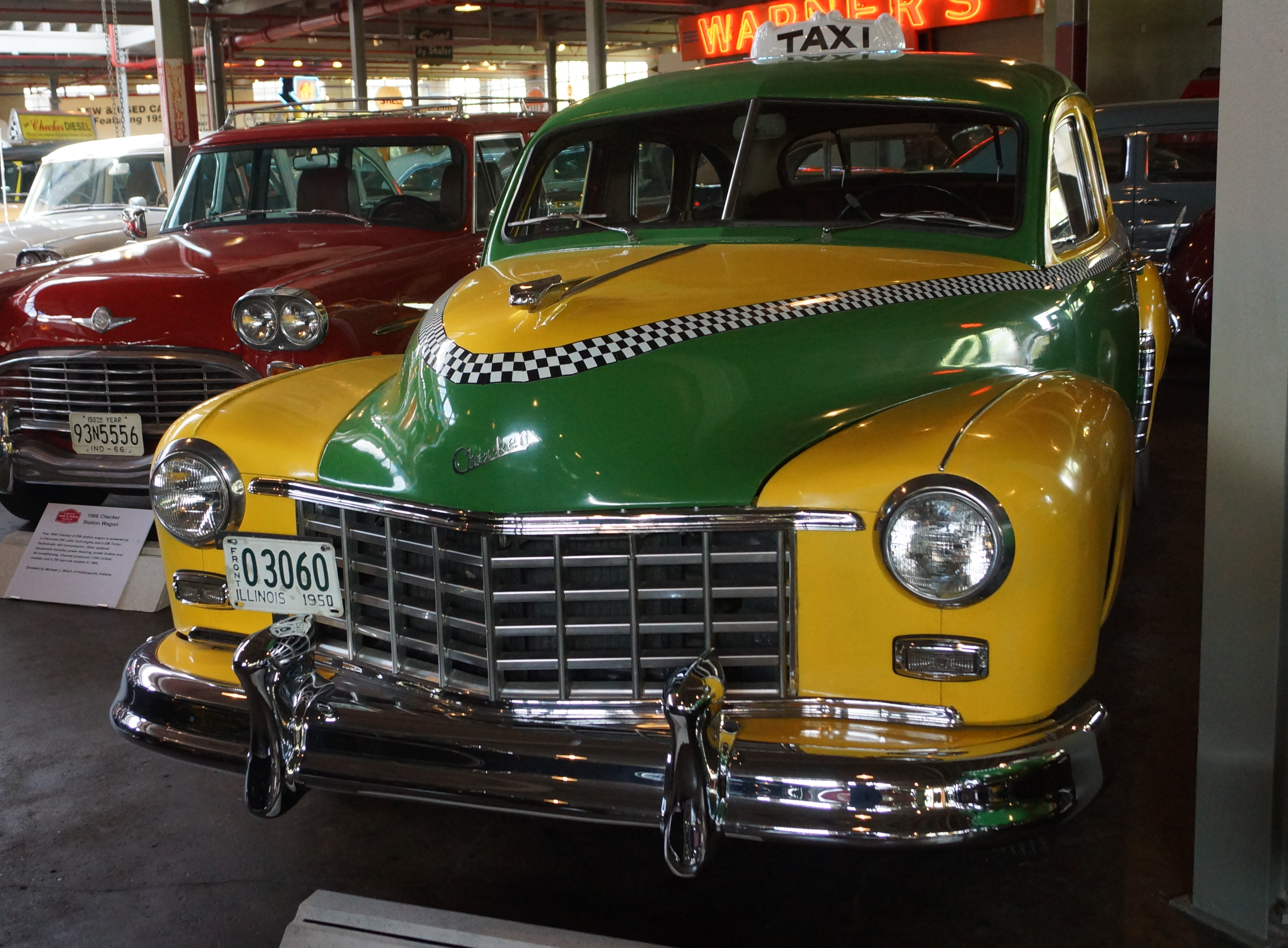
1950 Model A4 taxicab

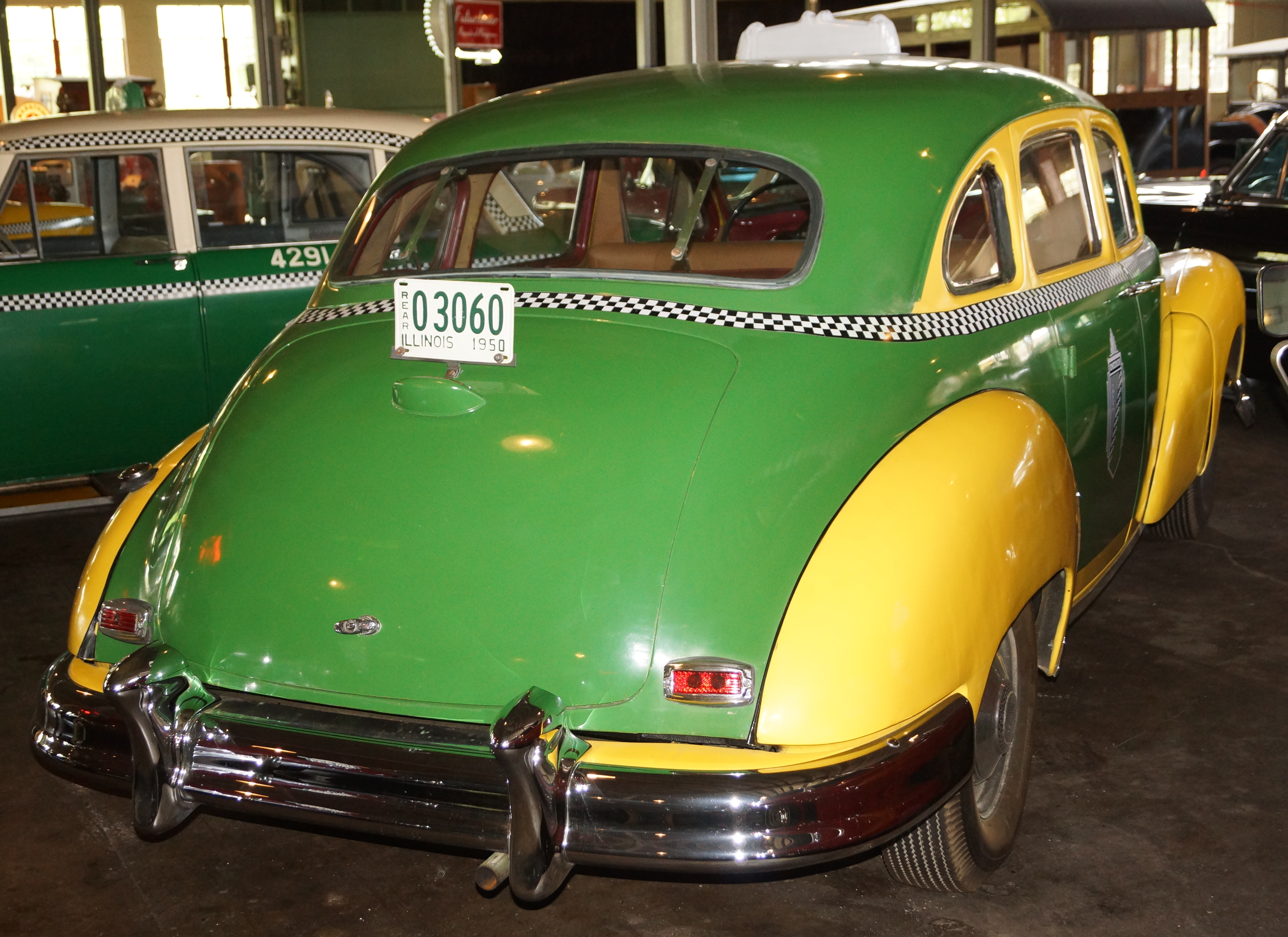
1950 Model A4 taxicab

- Model A2/A3 - 1947-49
- Model A4/A5 - 1950-52
- Model A6-A7 - 1953-54
- Model A8 - 1956-58
- Model A9/A10 - 1959-63
- Model A11/A12 - 1963-82

In 1954, New York City revised its specifications for taxicabs, eliminating the five-passenger rear compartment requirement and stipulating a wheelbase of 127 in (3,226 mm) or less, which effectively took Checker out of the market. A brand-new 120" wheelbase body-on-frame design was introduced in December 1956, called A8, and that basic body style would be retained for the duration of Checker production until the end, in 1982.

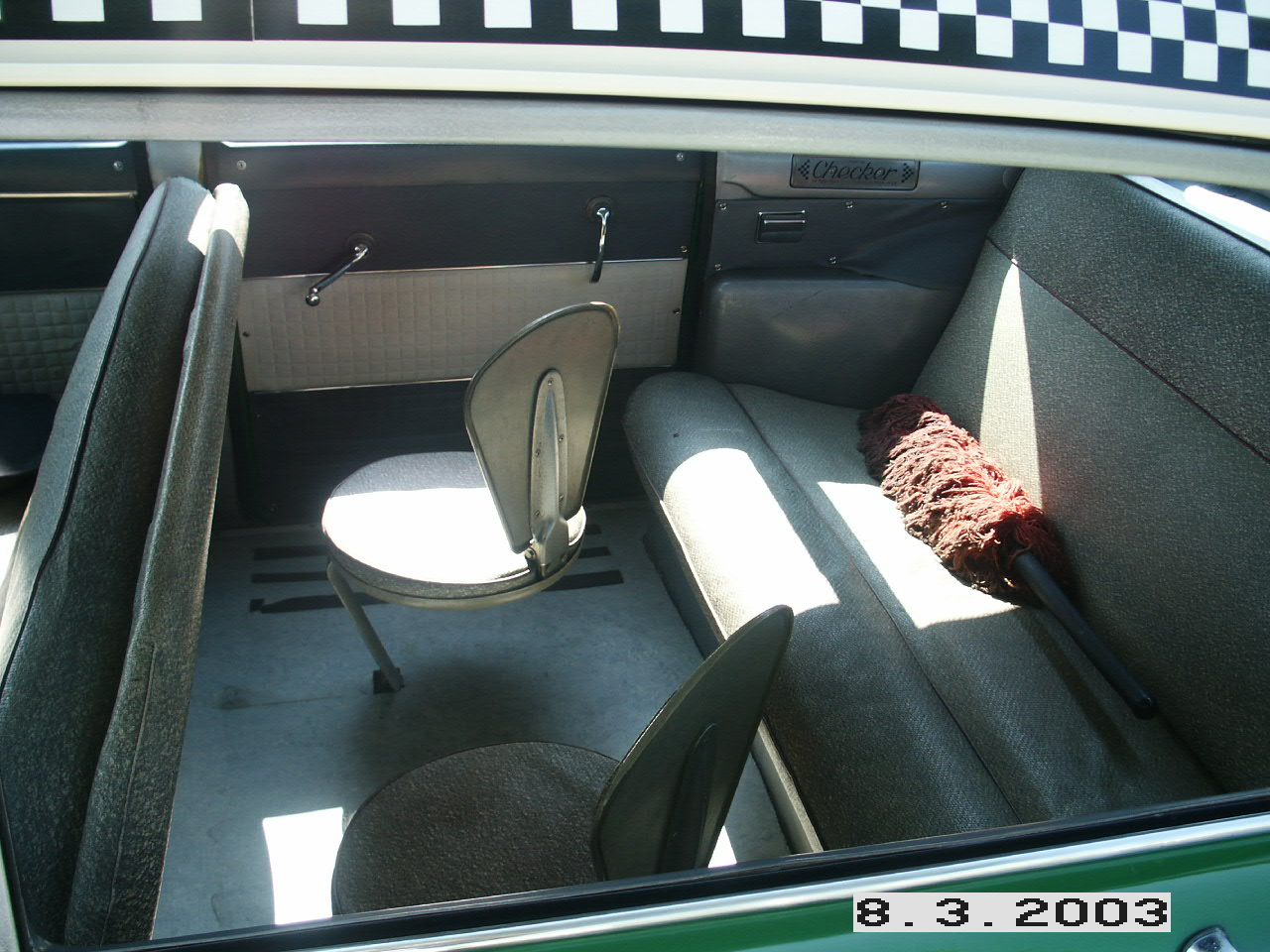
Interior of a 1957 Checker Taxi, showing the rear jumpseats

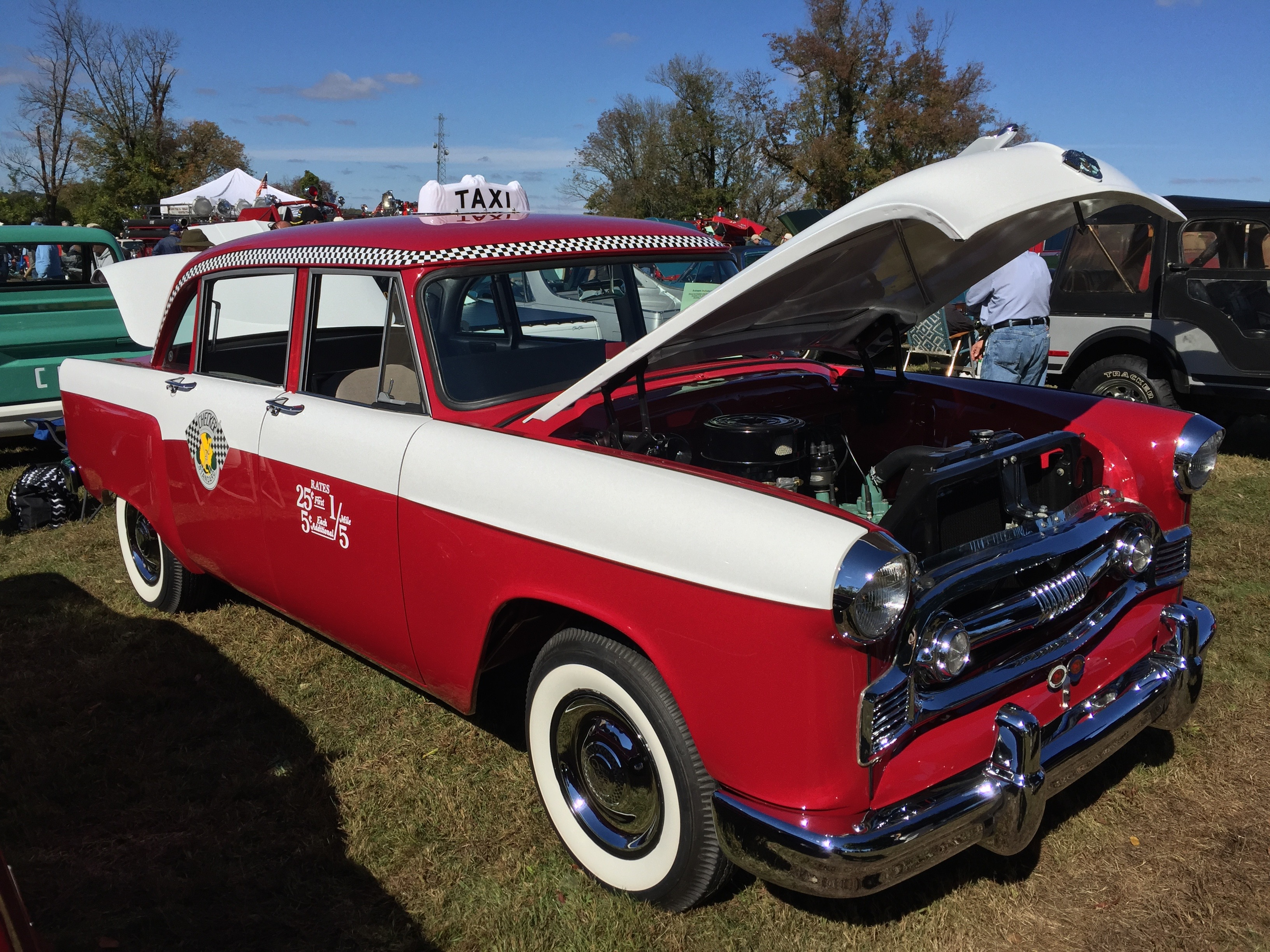
1958 Model A8 taxicab

The 1956 through 1958 A8 Checkers featured two headlights, 1953-1954 Pontiac Station Wagon taillight lenses, and a thick, single-bar grille. In 1958, quad headlights became legal in the U.S., and Checkers featured the quad headlights from that time forward, along with a new egg-crate grille insert. Parking lights were housed in each far side of the grille insert. Taillights were also changed to the familiar vertical chrome strip housing dual red lenses. Early models also featured a single separate bumper-mounted backup light. Another change between the A8 and later models is the rear window. Originally flat in the A8 with a thicker "C" pillar, the rear window on later models wrapped around a thinner roof-line, affording improved all-around visibility.

For 1960, Checker introduced the A9 series taxi, as well as for the first time, a passenger sedan to be marketed to the general public, the A10 Superba. For 1961, the Marathon sedan and station wagon were introduced, upscale versions of the Superba. The Superba was discontinued in 1963, and from that time on, the taxicabs were designated A11, the Marathon became the A12.

With the cancellation of the Continental inline six-cylinder engine for 1965, Checker switched to Chevrolet overhead-valve inline 6-cylinder engines, with the small-block Chevy 283 and 327 V8s optional. Starting in 1970, Checker used the ubiquitous 350 cubic-inch small-block Chevrolet V8 as an option, which was available until the end of production. GM phased out the Chevy inline six in 1979. Starting in 1980, both Chevrolet and Checker offered a new 229 cubic-inch V6 as the standard engine, with a small-block 305 or 350 V8 as optional.

The standard transmission for the Checker since the 1930s was a conventional 3-speed manual. In 1956, Checker offered a "Driv-Er-Matic Special" which featured a Borg-Warner automatic transmission and an overhead-valve Continental inline 6. By 1970, GM's Turbo Hydra-Matic 400 transmission became standard on all Checkers.

Starting in 1959, Checker began producing passenger car versions of the taxis to the general public. The first of these models were labeled "A10 Superba" and the line included a sedan as well as a station wagon. Superbas were built from 1960 through 1963. A more luxurious model called the "A12 Marathon" was introduced in 1961, and remained in production until 1982. To the public, Checker cars were advertised as a roomy and rugged alternative to the standard American passenger sedan. A Marathon station wagon (Model A12W) was also offered, but it saw limited sales with the public.

=== Anti-trust and gradual eclipse ===
In 1964, the State of New York pursued Markin and Checker on antitrust charges, alleging that it controlled both the taxi service and manufacture of taxis, and thus favored itself in fulfilling orders. Rather than allow Checker drivers to begin buying different brands of cars, Markin began selling licenses in New York City.

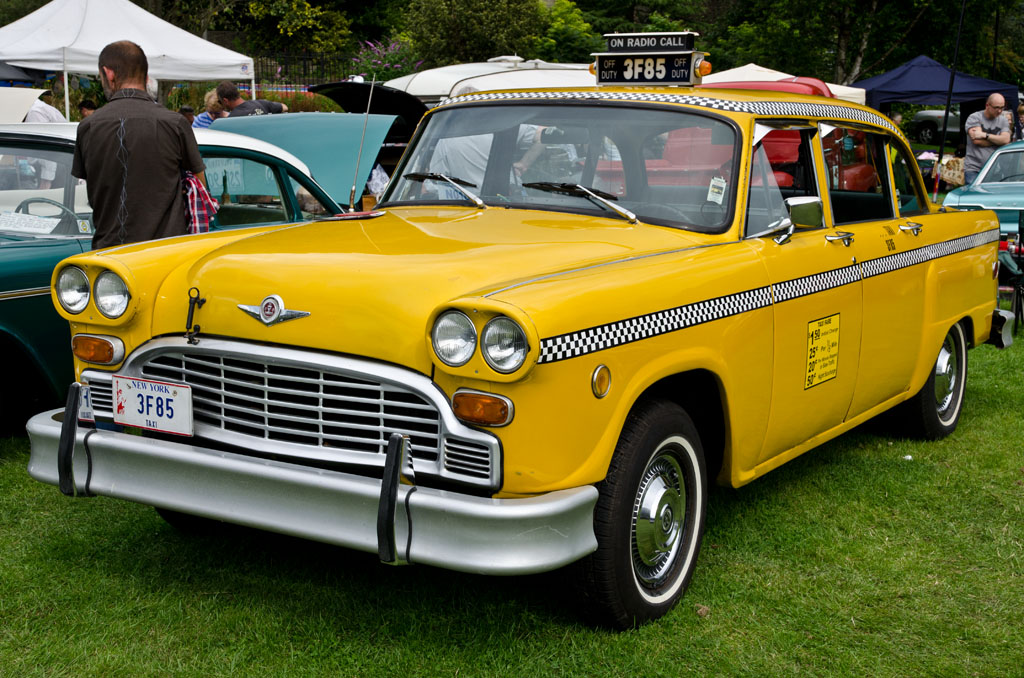
Model A11 taxicab in post 1973 specification

As U.S. Federal safety rules increased throughout the 1960s and 1970s, Checkers kept pace and despite having the same basic body design, Checker enthusiasts can often identify the year of a Checker based on its safety equipment. For example, starting in 1963, amber parking/directional lights were used up front. 1964 models introduced lap belts in front, energy-absorbing steering columns came in 1967. 1968 models featured round side marker lights on fenders along with shoulder belts, and 1969s introduced headrests for front outboard seating positions.

1970 began the use of full-size Chevrolet steering columns and steering wheels. 1974 models replaced the chrome-plated bumpers for larger, beam-type units that were painted aluminum and protected the lights in a 5-mph impact. The 1975 and later models were labeled "Unleaded Fuel Only", and 1978 introduced the new delta-style Chevrolet steering wheel. In the 1970s, power steering and power-assisted front disc brakes became standard. In 1978, the windshield wipers became parallel-action.

During the late 1960s and 1970s, Checker sold a few specialized versions of the A11. These included the Medicar and the Aerobus. The Medicar was introduced in 1969 and was designed to function as an ambulance, or transporter for wheelchair using passengers. The rear doors were large enough to allow a wheelchair to enter the car, and they swung open almost 180 degrees. This car also featured a raised roof, and facilities to lock a wheelchair to the floor when in motion. The Aerobus was a stretched version of the A12W Station Wagon. It accommodated up to 12 passengers and was marketed as an airline shuttle.

Despite its reputation as a basic taxicab, luxury, limousine-type Marathons were also available mostly in later years. One A-12E model, specially built for the wife of the CEO of the company, remains in brand-new condition with less than 50 miles on the odometer. Checker limos offered vinyl roofs with opera windows.

The final Checker A11/A12s were manufactured in 1982, when Checker exited the automobile manufacturing business. The company continued operations at partial capacity making parts for General Motors until January 2009 when it declared bankruptcy.

== Checker Taxicabs in the media ==
Because their styling changed little during its production run from 1958 through 1982, many film producers were not careful to use period-correct Checker cars in their work. Often, a later model Checker (with side marker lights, late-1970s bumpers, etc.) was used in 1950s or 1960s settings.

Modified Checkers were also used to represent Soviet GAZ-13 cars in movies and TV series, most notably the 1966–1973 Mission: Impossible TV series.

- Several A11 models are seen operated by the Sunshine Cab Company in the popular TV series Taxi. The cabs featured in the series were supplied by the Checker Motors Corporation.
- Travis Bickle, in Taxi Driver, drives a 1975 A11.
- Phoebe Buffay, in Friends, drives a 1977 A11.
- Kevin McCallister, in Home Alone 2: Lost in New York, gets a ride into New York City in a 1974 A11.
- David Johansen as the Ghost of Christmas Past in Scrooged, drives a 1978 A11.
- Cabbie, in Escape from New York, drives an armoured 1967 A11.
- In the 2013 film Percy Jackson: Sea of Monsters, the Chariot of Damnation is a 1977 A11.
- Wilbur Wills, in Second Sight (film), drives a 1980 A12.

In Grand Theft Auto games, the Checker Taxi appears as a controllable taxicab known as the "Cabbie".

== Collectibility ==
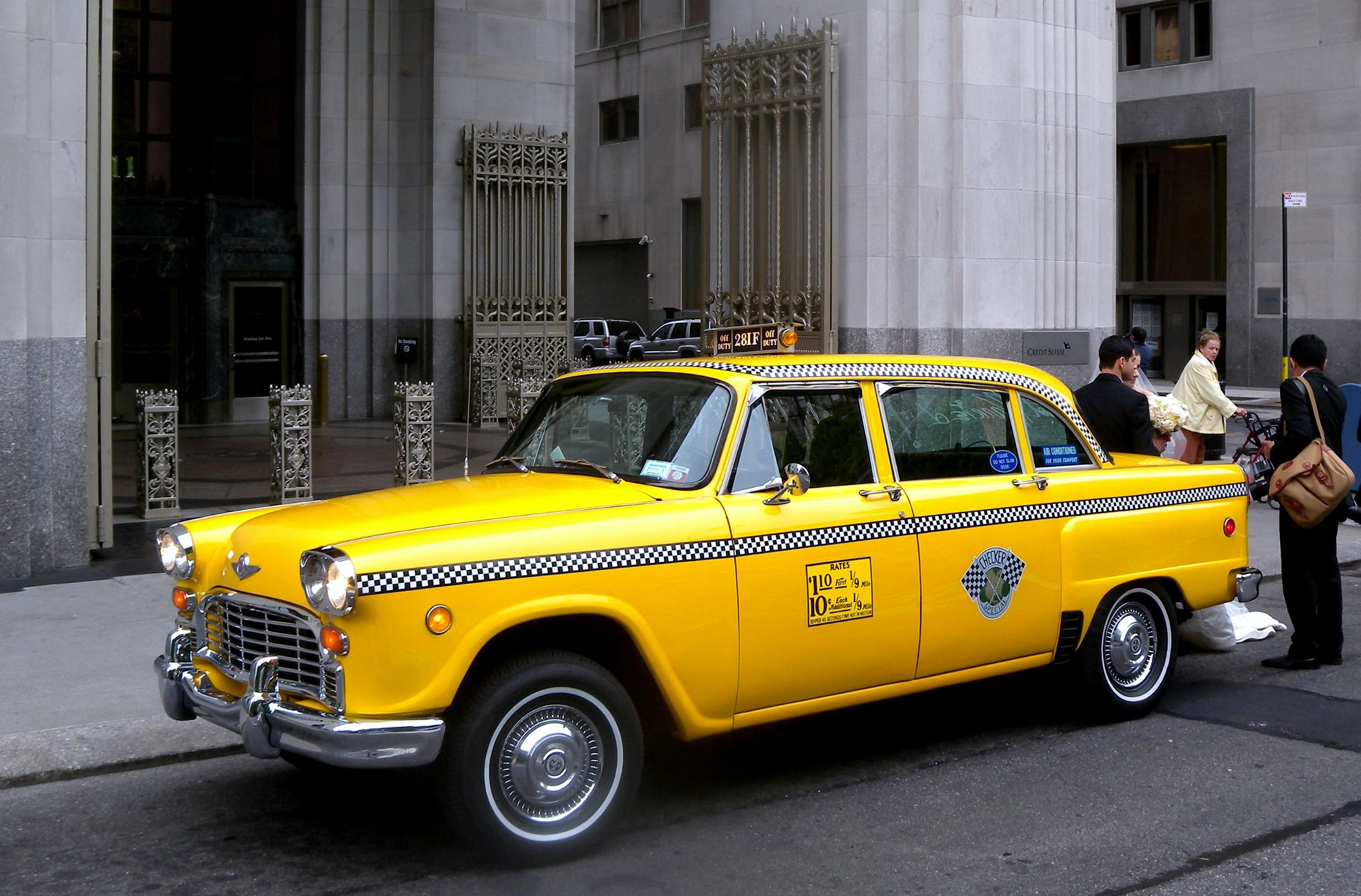
A restored Checker A11 in use as a wedding car in New York City in 2011

With the exception of the A10, A11, and Marathon models, only a handful of pre-1960 Checkers exist. They were produced in the thousands, but led a life of rough city streets, constant idling, and high mileage. Once they were retired from taxi service, they typically were scrapped. Once production ceased in 1982, some collectors became interested. At that time, however, only the later models still existed, so those are mostly the cars that can be found today.

Two restored older Checkers reside in the Gilmore Car Museum in Hickory Corners, Michigan. One is a 1923 Model E, the other is a 1936 Model Y. The museum also features the very last car the company assembled, a 1982 A11 taxi in Chicago green and ivory livery. At least two A8s exist, one a Driv-R-Matic Special, in restored condition. In the early 1950s, just before the 1952 Summer Olympics in Helsinki, a number of well-worn Checker A2s and A4s were shipped to Finland to address a taxicab shortage. A 1939 Model A is also in the hands of a private collector, completely restored. It is the only Model A known to exist today. Several hundred post-1960 Checkers in various conditions exist. A Checker A2 was restored in 2017 in Finland, and was to be shown in Lahti Classic Motorshow 2017. It may be the only fully restored A2 model in the world. One single 1949 Checker Model A3 pleasure car is currently under restoration. Two Checker Model A4 are known to survive, one restored in 1950 and one in 1952.

== See also ==
- Yellow cab
