= Aerobus (disambiguation) =

Aerobus may refer to:

- Aerobus, a self-propelled electrically powered bus-like suspended monorail vehicle
- a name for a bus line connecting an airport in some areas
- Checker Aerobus, a long limousine
- Mitsubishi Fuso Aero Bus, a series of heavy-duty intercity coaches
- Viva (airline), a Mexican low-cost airline formerly known as Viva Aerobus
