= TransAsia Airways Flight 235 =

2015 aviation accident in Taiwan

- A dashcam still showing the aircraft clipping a taxi and the Huandong Viaduct, seconds before crashing

Accident
- Date: 4 February 2015
- Summary: Loss of control and crash following pilot misidentification of failed engine
- Site: Keelung River, Taipei, Taiwan; 25°03′47″N 121°37′04″E
- Total fatalities: 43
- Total injuries: 17

Aircraft
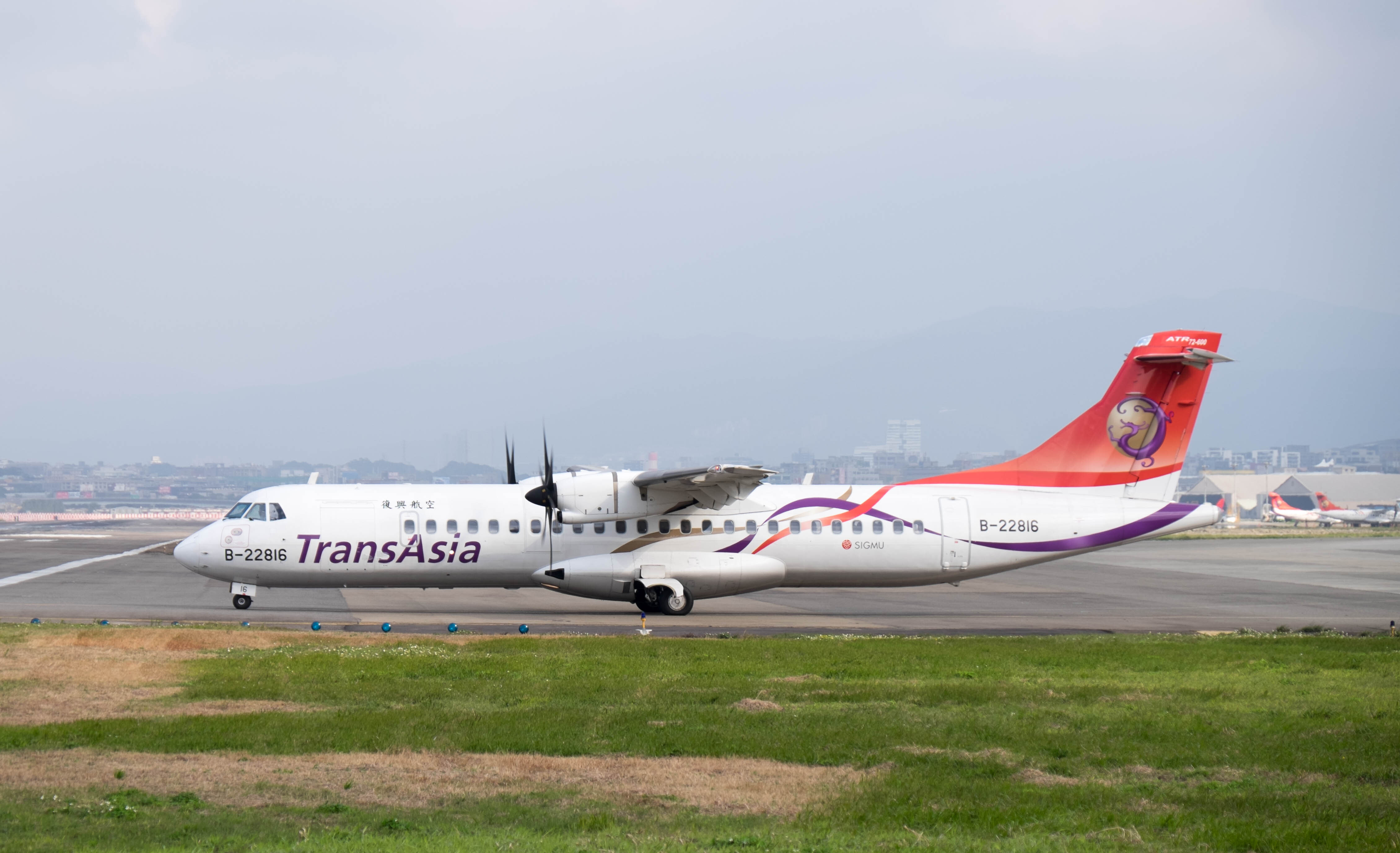
- B-22816, the aircraft involved in the accident, photographed in January 2015
- Aircraft type: ATR 72-600
- Operator: TransAsia Airways
- IATA flight No.: GE235
- ICAO flight No.: TNA235
- Call sign: TRANSASIA 235
- Registration: B-22816
- Flight origin: Taipei Songshan Airport, Songshan, Taipei, Taiwan
- Destination: Kinmen Airport, Kinmen
- Occupants: 58
- Passengers: 53
- Crew: 5
- Fatalities: 43
- Injuries: 15
- Survivors: 15

Ground casualties
- Ground injuries: 2

TransAsia Airways Flight 235 was a domestic flight from Taipei to Kinmen, Taiwan. On 4 February 2015, the aircraft serving the flight, a 10-month-old ATR 72, crashed into the Keelung River around 5 km (3.1 mi; 2.7 nmi) from Taipei Songshan Airport, from where the aircraft had just departed. On board were 58 people, 15 of whom survived with injuries.

Two minutes after takeoff, the pilots reported an engine failure. After climbing to a height of 1,630 ft (500 m), the other engine, still operating normally, was mistakenly shut down. The aircraft lost altitude, banked sharply to the left and clipped a taxi traveling west on the Huandong Viaduct (causing injuries to two more persons), then the viaduct itself, before crashing into the river below.

Flight 235 was the second fatal accident involving a TransAsia Airways ATR aircraft within seven months; Flight 222 had crashed on 23 July 2014, also with 58 people on board. On that flight, 48 people had died.

== Flight ==
Location of the accident and departure/destination airports

Flight 235 departed Taipei Songshan Airport at 10:52 Taiwan time (02:52 UTC), for its destination of Kinmen Airport, with 53 passengers and five crew members on board. Shortly after take-off, a fault in the autofeather unit of the number-2 engine caused the automatic take-off power control system to autofeather that engine. (Note: The autofeather unit is supposed to cut in automatically so as to minimize the drag from a windmilling propeller in the event of a single engine failure.) The flight crew misdiagnosed the problem, and shut down the still-functioning number-1 engine. The aircraft reached an altitude of 1,630 ft (500 m) and then began descending until it crashed. The last pilot communication to air traffic control was: "Mayday, mayday, engine flameout." At 10:55, the aircraft crashed into the Keelung River, on the border of Nangang District of Taipei and Xizhi District of New Taipei.

The crash was recorded by dashcams in several cars travelling west along the elevated Huandong Viaduct next to the river. The aircraft, flying level, first cleared an apartment building. Then it rolled sharply, at nearly a 90° bank angle, left wing down. As the aircraft flew low over the elevated viaduct, its left wingtip struck the front of a Volkswagen Caddy taxi travelling west on the viaduct, and the outboard section of the wing was torn off when it struck the concrete guardrail at the edge of the viaduct. The aircraft continued its roll and struck the water upside down, breaking into two main pieces. The collision with the taxi and the viaduct was captured in footage from a dashcam in a car travelling a short distance behind the taxi, and debris from the plane's wing and pieces of the viaduct's guardrail were thrown across the road surface. Two people in the taxi suffered minor injuries.

At the time of the accident, no adverse weather phenomena were observed. At 11:00, the cloud base at Songshan was about 1,500 ft (460 m), the visibility was unrestricted, and a light breeze was blowing from the east at 10 knots (19 km/h; 12 mph). The temperature was 16 °C (61 °F).

== Aircraft ==
The aircraft involved in the accident was an ATR 72-600 twin-turboprop, registration B-22816, MSN 1141. It first flew on 28 March 2014, and was delivered to TransAsia Airways on 15 April 2014. The left Pratt & Whitney Canada PW127M engine was replaced in August 2014.

== Passengers and crew ==
The passenger manifest was composed of 49 adults and 4 children. Thirty-one passengers were mainland Chinese; many were visitors from Xiamen on a six-day tour of Taiwan. The remaining 22 passengers were Taiwanese.

The flight crew consisted of two pilots, both ranked as captains; the captain was Liao Chien-tsung, (Note: Chinese: 廖建宗; pinyin: Liào Jiànzōng) 42, with a total of 4,914 flight hours (including 3,401 hours on the ATR 72) and the co-pilot was Liu Tze-chung, (Note: Chinese: 劉自忠; pinyin: Liú Zìzhōng) 45, with a total of 6,922 flight hours, including 6,481 hours on the ATR 72. Also, an observer, Hung Ping-chung, (Note: Chinese: 洪炳衷; pinyin: Hóng Bǐngzhōng) 63, was seated in the cockpit jump seat, who had a total of 16,121 flight hours, 5,314 of them on the ATR 72. Two flight attendants (including Huang Ching-ya) were working as cabin crew. All crew members were Taiwanese citizens; the co-pilot was a dual New Zealand–Taiwanese citizen.

Nationality	Passengers	Crew	Total
Taiwan (Note: The First officer had dual New Zealand-Taiwanese citizenship)	22	5	27
China	31	—N/a	31
Total	53	5	58

== Rescue and recovery ==
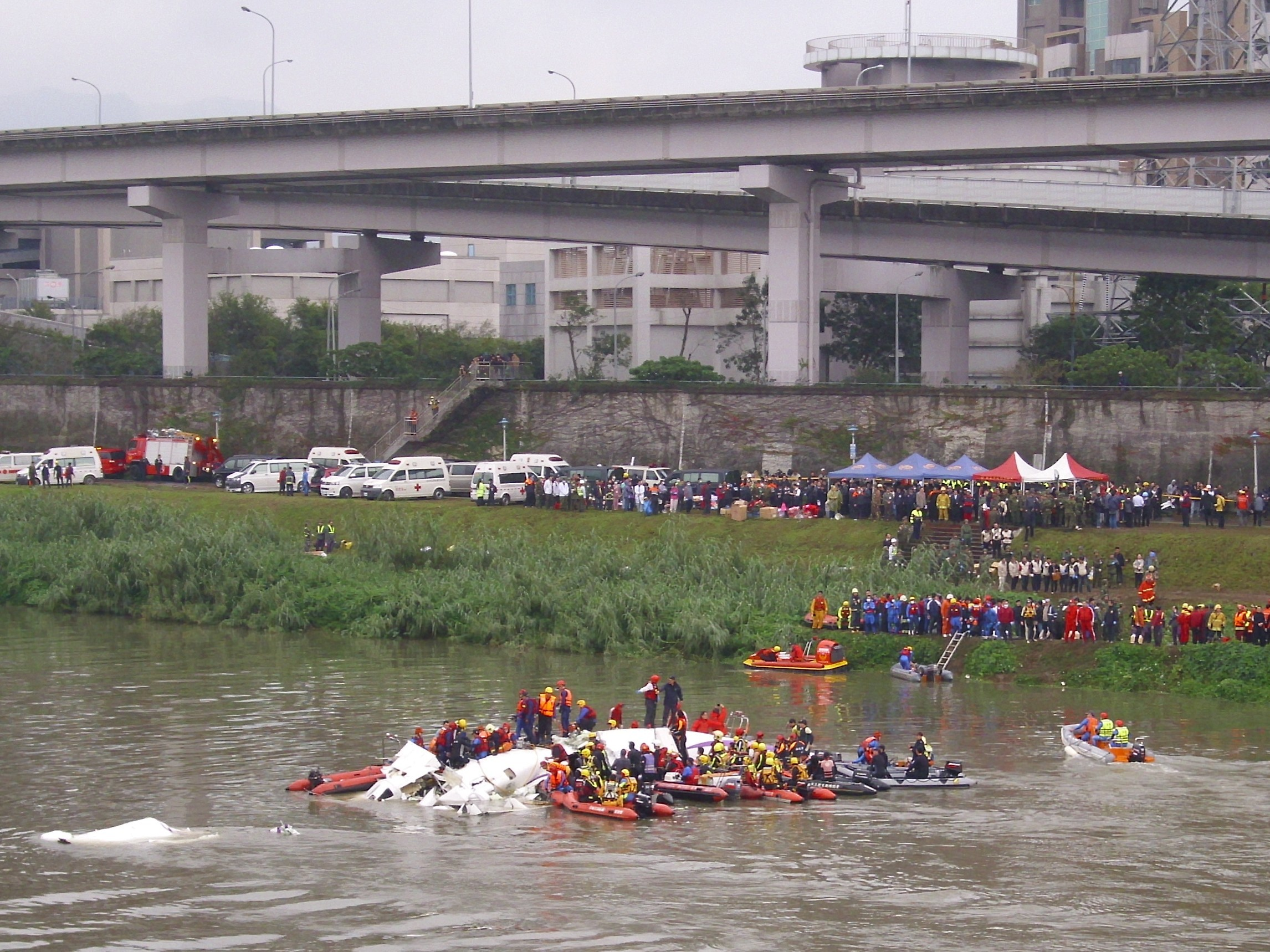
Rescue operations in the Keelung River around the wreckage of Flight 235, the Huandong Viaduct in the background

Taipei police and fire departments received dozens of calls from eyewitnesses almost immediately after the crash. The Taipei Fire Department, military, and volunteer rescue workers arrived at the crash scene within minutes, and reached the survivors by boat around 35 minutes after the crash. They began removing survivors from the rear section of the semisubmerged fuselage and ferried them to shore in inflatable boats. Divers were forced to cut the seat belts of dead passengers, located mostly in the front section, to remove their bodies. That work was made difficult by low visibility under water.

The aircraft's flight recorders were recovered shortly after 16:00 that day. After 20:00, cranes were used to lift large sections of the fuselage ashore.

Of the 58 people on board the flight, only 15 survived. One of the two flight attendants, Huang Ching-ya, survived.

== Press reports ==
Some media outlets reported anonymous claims that the pilot had complained of "engine abnormalities" and asked for an inspection of the aircraft prior to take-off, but that the request had been refused. This assertion has been denied by both TransAsia Airways and the Civil Aeronautics Administration, the former of whom has released the maintenance records for both powerplants, both propellers, and the airframe.

== Reactions ==
=== TransAsia Airways ===
Following the accident, TransAsia Airways changed its website and social media branding to greyscale images, in mourning for the presumed deaths of the passengers. On 5 February, TransAsia retired the flight number GE235, changing it to GE2353.

=== Taiwan ===
The spokesperson of the Office of the President of the Republic of China reported that President Ma Ying-jeou was very concerned about the accident and had given orders to the Executive Yuan and related authorities to provide maximum assistance with the rescue. Immediately after the accident, the president of the Executive Yuan, Mao Chi-kuo, contacted the Ministry of Transportation and Civil Aeronautics Administration to instigate an investigation into the crash, and the minister of national defense to prepare the military for the rescue. The final report on the investigation carried out by Taiwan Transportation Safety Board was released on 30 June 2016.

=== China ===
Over half of the passengers on board the aircraft were Chinese. On 5 February 2015, Xi Jinping, the General Secretary of the Chinese Communist Party, released a statement, ordering that accurate information on the aircraft be obtained as quickly as possible, and that "assistance [be provided] in treating the injured". On the same day, Chinese Premier Li Keqiang instructed relevant departments to obtain accurate information from Taipei as quickly as possible.

== Investigation ==
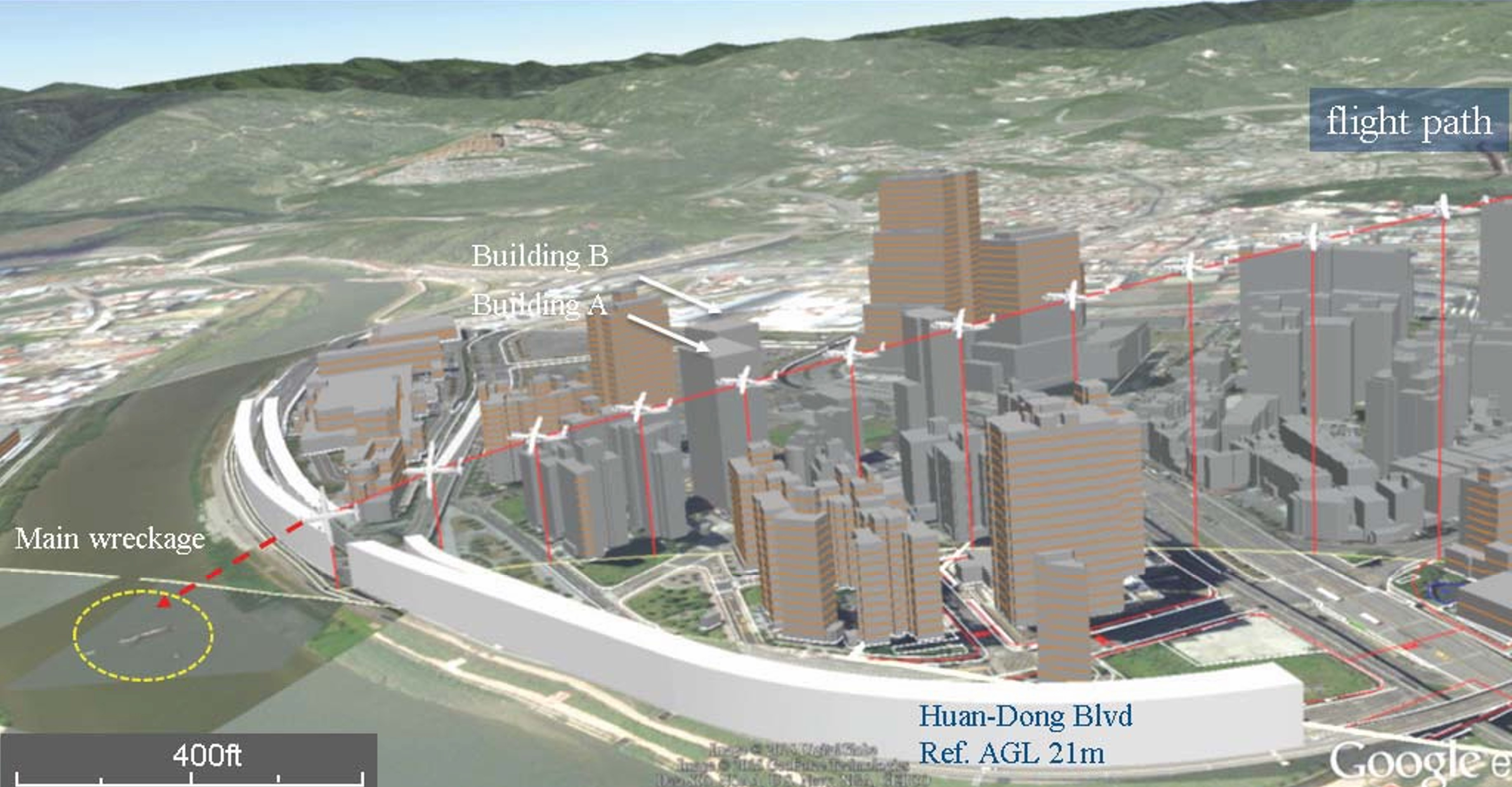
Reconstructed trajectory of the final moments of the flight

The Taiwanese Aviation Safety Council (ASC) led the investigation into the accident. The French Bureau of Enquiry and Analysis for Civil Aviation Safety (BEA) represented the country of manufacture, and the Transportation Safety Board of Canada represented the country of engine manufacture. Other parties to the investigation included the Taiwanese Civil Aeronautics Administration, the operator (TransAsia), the aircraft (ATR) and engine (Pratt & Whitney Canada) manufacturers, and Transport Canada. The cockpit voice recorder and flight data recorder were recovered on the evening of 4 February, and the data were analysed. According to the executive director of the ASC, Thomas Wang, the aircraft's right engine triggered an alarm just 37 seconds after takeoff. Whereas the crew reported a flameout, according to Wang, data showed the right engine had in fact been moved to idle power. Soon the right engine failed to produce enough thrust for its rotating propeller, lapsing into auto-feathering. A restart was attempted, but the aircraft crashed 72 seconds later.

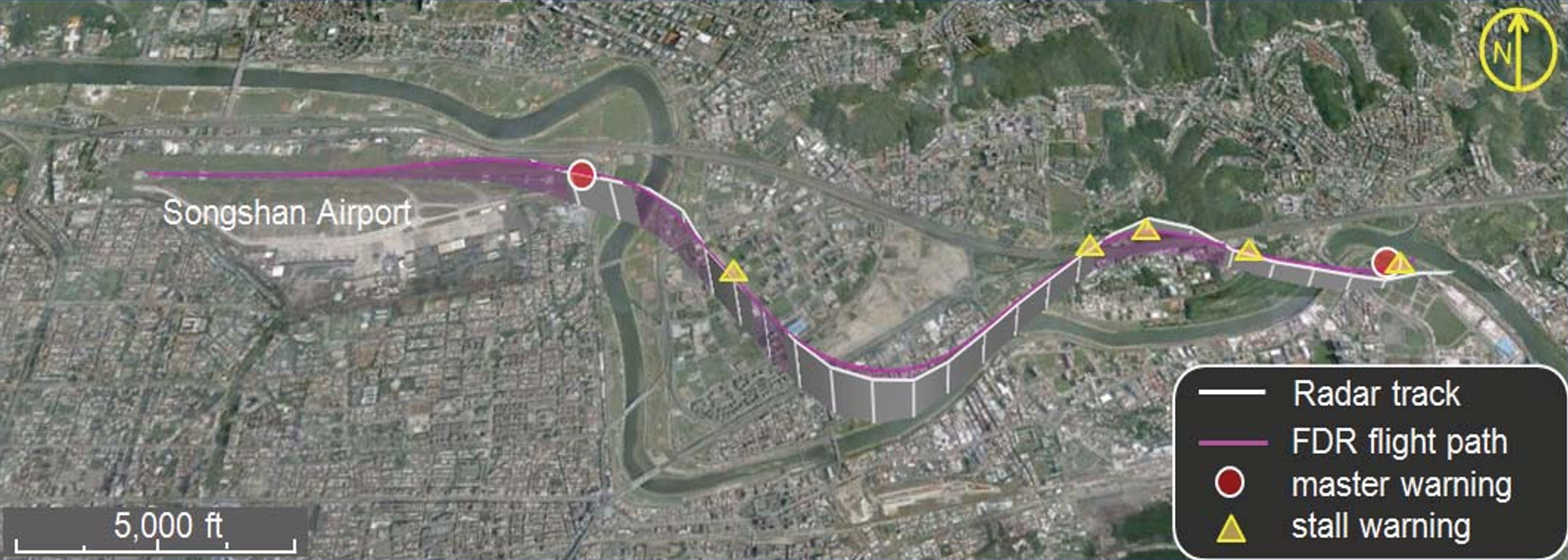
Flight path with relevant cockpit warnings

On 6 February, investigators revealed that the left engine, which does not appear to have had suffered a malfunction, had been manually shut off, while cautioning that the investigation was "too early to say if human error was a factor". Investigators released the following preliminary sequence of events:

Sequence of events
Duration (HH:MM:SS)	Time		Event	Selected CVR items	
Duration (HH:MM:SS)	UTC UTC+0	Local UTC+8:00	Event	Source	Content (Italics denote translation from Chinese)
00:00:00.0	02:41:14.6	10:41:14.6	Start of recording	Commentary	[GE235 recording begins]
00:09:58.1	02:51:12.7	10:51:12.7	Crew receives take-off clearance	Tower controller	Transasia two three five runway one zero wind one zero zero degree niner knots cleared for takeoff.
00:11:19.2	02:52:33.8	10:52:33.8	Tower asks the crew to contact Taipei Departure	Tower controller	Transasia two three five contact Taipei approach one one niner decimal seven good day.
00:11:23.7	02:52:38.3	10:52:38.3	Right engine failure alert; master warning sounds for 3s	Cockpit area microphone	[sound of master warning until 10:52:40.0]
00:11:27.4	02:52:42.0	10:52:42.0	Crew reduces power to the left engine		
00:11:28.4	02:52:43.0	10:52:43.0	Crew mentions retracting the left engine (retracts throttle and shuts off)	Captain Liao	I will pull back engine one throttle.
	02:53:00.4	10:53:00.4	Crew discuss engine shutdown checklist	Captain Liu	Okay engine flameout check.
	02:53:06.4	10:53:06.4	Crew reduces power to the left engine again	Captain Liao	Pull back number one.
	02:53:07.7	10:53:07.7	Crew mentions that the right engine stalled	Captain Liu	Okay now number two engine flameout confirmed.
	02:53:09.9	10:53:09.9	Stall warning sounds	Cockpit area microphone	[sound of stall warning until 10:53:10.8]
	02:53:12.6	10:53:12.6	Stall warning sounds for the second time. Stick shaker activates.	Cockpit area microphone	[sound of stall warning until 10:53:18.8] [sound of stick shaker until 10:53:18.8]
	02:53:19.6	10:53:19.6	Left engine is feathered and shut down	Captain Liao	Number one.
	02:53:21.4	10:53:21.4	Stall warning sounds for the third time. Stick shaker activates for the second time.	Cockpit area microphone	[sound of stall warning until 10:53:23.3] [sound of stick shaker until 10:53:23.3]
	02:53:24.0	10:53:24.0	Crew cuts power to the left engine		
	02:53:25.7	10:53:25.7	Stall warning sounds for the fourth time. Stick shaker activates for the third time.	Cockpit area microphone	[sound of stall warning until 10:53:27.3] [sound of stick shaker until 10:53:27.3]
	02:53:34.9	10:53:34.9	Crew declares emergency	Captain Liu (radio)	Tower transasia two tree five mayday, mayday, engine flameout.
	02:53:55.9	10:53:55.9	Stall warning sounds for the fifth time. Stick shaker activates for the fourth time.	Cockpit area microphone	[sound of stall warning until 10:53:59.7] [sound of stick shaker until 10:53:59.7]
	02:54:06.1	10:54:06.1	Stall warning sounds for the sixth time. Stick shaker activates for the fifth time.	Cockpit area microphone	[sound of stall warning until 10:54:10.1] [sound of stick shaker until 10:54:10.1]
	02:54:09.2	10:54:09.2	Crew calls for restarting the left engine multiple times	Captain Liao	Restart the engine.
	02:54:12.4	10:54:12.4	Stall warning sounds for the seventh time. Stick shaker activates for the sixth time.	Cockpit area microphone	[sound of stall warning until 10:54:21.6] [sound of stick shaker until 10:54:21.6]
00:13:05.4	02:54:20.0	10:54:20.0	The left engine is restarted		
	02:54:33.2	10:54:23.2	Stall warning sounds for the eighth time. Stick shaker activates for the seventh time.	Cockpit area microphone	[sound of stall warning until 10:54:33.9] [sound of stick shaker until 10:54:33.9]
00:13:19.8	02:54:34.4	10:54:34.6	Master warning sounds for 3s	Cockpit area microphone	[master warning]
00:13:20.2	02:54:34.8	10:54:34.8	An unidentified sound is heard	Cockpit area microphone	[unidentified sound]
00:13:21.3	02:54:35.9	10:54:35.9	End of FDR recording	Ground proximity warning system	Pull up.
00:13:21.8	02:54:36.4	10:54:36.4	End of CVR recording	Commentary	[CVR recording ends]

=== Interim report ===
The ASC issued an interim report on 2 July. Without assigning responsibility for the crash, the report confirmed that a still-functional engine number one was incorrectly shut down by the pilot following the failure of engine number two (right engine). The report also stated that the pilot in command had failed to pass a simulator test in May 2014, partly because he demonstrated insufficient knowledge about the procedure for handling an engine flameout during takeoff. He retook the test the following month, however, and successfully passed. The ASC released a draft report in November 2015 and published the final version in July 2016.

=== Final report ===
The final report found that, following the uncommanded autofeather of engine number 2 (right engine), the pilot flying the aircraft reduced power and subsequently shut down the operative engine number 1 (left engine). The flight crew failed to perform the failure identification procedure and did not comply with standard operating procedures. As a result, the pilot flying the aircraft became confused regarding the identification and nature of the propulsion-system malfunction. The autofeathering was caused by compromised soldering joints in the autofeather unit. During the initial stages of the take-off roll, the flight crew did not reject the take-off when the automatic take-off power control system ARM pushbutton did not light, and TransAsia did not have a clear requirement to do so. The loss of engine power during the initial climb and inappropriate flight control inputs by the pilot flying generated stall warnings and activation of the stick pusher to which the crew did not respond in a timely and effective manner. The loss of power from both engines was not detected and corrected by the crew in time and the aircraft stalled during the attempted restart at an altitude from which they could not recover. Ineffective flight crew coordination, communication, and threat and error management compromised the safety of the flight. The crew failed to obtain relevant data from each other regarding the status of both engines. The pilot flying did not appropriately respond to input from the pilot monitoring.

During the investigation, TransAsia Airways disclosed confidential information from the draft report to Next magazine, which published a story in its issue of 11 May 2016. This was an attempt to influence the investigation into the accident. TransAsia Airways were fined NT$3,000,000 (US$92,000).

== Aftermath ==
The Civil Aeronautics Administration announced it would subject all TransAsia Airways ATR pilots to supplementary proficiency tests between 7 and 10 February, resulting in the cancellation of more than 100 TransAsia flights. Ten pilots who failed the engine-out oral test and a further nineteen who did not attend were suspended for one month, pending a retest. TransAsia subsequently demoted one pilot from captain to first officer. Reuters reported that the government ordered all Taiwanese airlines to "review their safety protocols". The Taiwanese CAA announced that it is focusing its attention on TransAsia's training and operations and the country's labor ministry fined the airline for breaches of the labor code over excessive working hours.

On 11 February, TransAsia offered NT$14.9 million (about US$475,000) in compensation to the family of each of the dead. This amount includes emergency relief and funeral allowance, totaling NT$1.4M (US$44,300), already paid to each family. Not all of the families have accepted the offer.

The taxi struck by the plane, now preserved in the Taxi Museum

The taxi that was struck by the plane has been transported and preserved in the Taxi Museum in Su'ao, Yilan County.

Before this accident, TransAsia Airways Flight 222, which involved another ATR 72-500, crashed during approach as a result of pilot error.

These two accidents significantly weakened the airline's image. The airline ceased operations and shut down indefinitely on 22 November 2016.

== In popular culture ==
The Canadian TV series Mayday (also known as Air Disasters and Air Emergency in the US and Air Crash Investigation in the UK and the rest of the world) covered Flight 235 in episode seven of season 17, called "Caught on Tape", which was first broadcast on 19 September 2017 in Australia.

== See also ==
- List of accidents and incidents involving commercial aircraft
- Kegworth air disaster, SA Airlink Flight 8911, Transair Flight 810 and Azerbaijan Airlines Flight 56 - other cases of wrong engine shutdown
- Yeti Airlines Flight 691 – inadvertent feathering and loss of thrust on both engines
