= Taxi Museum =

Taxi-themed museum in Su'ao, Yilan County, Taiwan

TAXI Museum
- 計程車博物館
- Established: 9 July 2019
- Location: Su'ao, Yilan County, Taiwan
- Coordinates: 24.605412°N 121.831144°E
- Type: Automobile museum
- Director: Lee Chi-Cheng
- Website: http://taximuseum.com/

The TAXI Museum (Chinese: 計程車博物館; pinyin: Jì chéng chē bówùguǎn) is an automobile museum of taxis in Su'ao, Yilan County, Taiwan. The museum was established in 2019, and it displays several taxis and more than 2,000 taxi-related exhibits. The TAXI Museum is the first museum in the world to be primarily focused on taxis.

== History ==
Lee Chi-Cheng (Chinese:李濟成; pinyin: Lǐ jì chéng), director of the TAXI Museum, began to collect various taxi-related items after he bought a toy taxi of which the plate number was "NYC-1009", in New York City in 2000.

== Collections ==
=== NYC Taxi toy ===
The first collection Lee Chi-Cheng bought when he was traveling in New York City in 2000. The plate number "NYC-1009" is same as his birthday: 9 October.

=== Taxis ===
- (United States) 1947 WILLYS JEEP MB GPW
- (Germany) 1957 MERCEDES-BENZ W123
- (Japan) 1962 Nissan BLUEBIRD P312
- (United Kingdom) 1967 Austin FX4
- (United States) 1972 CHECKER MARATHON
- (Taiwan) 1980 裕隆 YUE LOONG 勝利 CEDRIC 803DL
- (Germany) 1983 MERCEDES-BENZ W120
- (Portugal) 1988 Peugeot 505
- (Taiwan) 1988 裕隆 YUE LOONG 速利 Sunny 303
- (France) Peugeot 406 in Taxi (Replica)
- (Japan) 1996 TOYOTA CROWN CONFORT (Swing roof)
- (Hong Kong) 2001 TOYOTA CROWN CONFORT (Red from Metropolitan Area)
- (Hong Kong) 2002 TOYOTA CROWN CONFORT (Green from New Territories)
- (Hong Kong) 2002 TOYOTA CROWN CONFORT (Blue from Lantau Island)
- (Taiwan) 2002 Nissan CEFIRO A33
- (Japan) 2005 TOYOTA CROWN SUPER DELUXE G (Privately owned taxi)
- (Taiwan) 2010 TOYOTA COROLLA ALTIS E140
- (Japan) 2014 TOYOTA CROWN CONFORT (Checker Cab Musen Cooperative)

=== The taxi which was clipped by TransAsia Airways Flight 235 ===
A Volkswagen CADDY MAXI taxi which was clipped by TransAsia Airways Flight 235 at Huandong Viaduct before the plane crashed into the Keelung River. The taxi protected the driver's and the passenger's lives after it was hit by the plane.

=== Other collections ===
- Cycle rickshaw from Taiwan and Indonesia
- Tuk-Tuk
- Taxi displays
- Taximeter
- A 1920s mechanical Taximeter from India
- Model taxis
- Any kinds of taxi-related exhibits, like CDs, books, toys, clothes, etc.
