= Huang Ching-ya =

Taiwanese politician

- 黃敬雅

Personal details
- Born: October 26, 1988 (age 37) Kaohsiung, Taiwan
- Party: Democratic Progressive Party
- Other political affiliations: Taiwan Statebuilding Party
- Spouse: Chiu Hsien-chun
- Children: 1
- Education: National Taitung University, Department of Chinese Literature *Guoguang Laboratory School, National Sun Yat-sen University *Affiliated Senior High School of National Kaohsiung Normal University *Qixian Elementary School, Sinsing District, Kaohsiung City *Catholic Lok Yan Kindergarten
- Occupation: Politician, flight attendant
- Website: Facebook page
- Nickname: Jijin Zhang Lingyu

Huang Ching-ya (born October 26, 1988) is a Taiwanese politician and former flight attendant of TransAsia Airways.

== Biography ==
Huang was born in Kaohsiung and received a bachelor's degree from National Taitung University.

In 2015, Huang survived the crash of TransAsia Airways Flight 235, the only crew member to do so.

In 2022, Huang joined the Taiwan Statebuilding Party (TSP), registering in the tenth electoral district of Kaohsiung City (Cianjhen District and Siaogang District), and ran in the 2022 Taiwanese city and county council elections, but lost by 7,634 votes. She withdrew from the TSP two days later.

Huang joined the Democratic Progressive Party in 2023, and prepares to campaign for the 2026 Kaohsiung City councilor election.

== Personal life ==
Huang is married to Chiu Hsien-chun, a member of the Democratic Progressive Party and former aide to Cheng Yun-peng. They have a daughter.
