= National Taitung University =

University in Taitung City, Taitung County, Taiwan

- 國立臺東大學
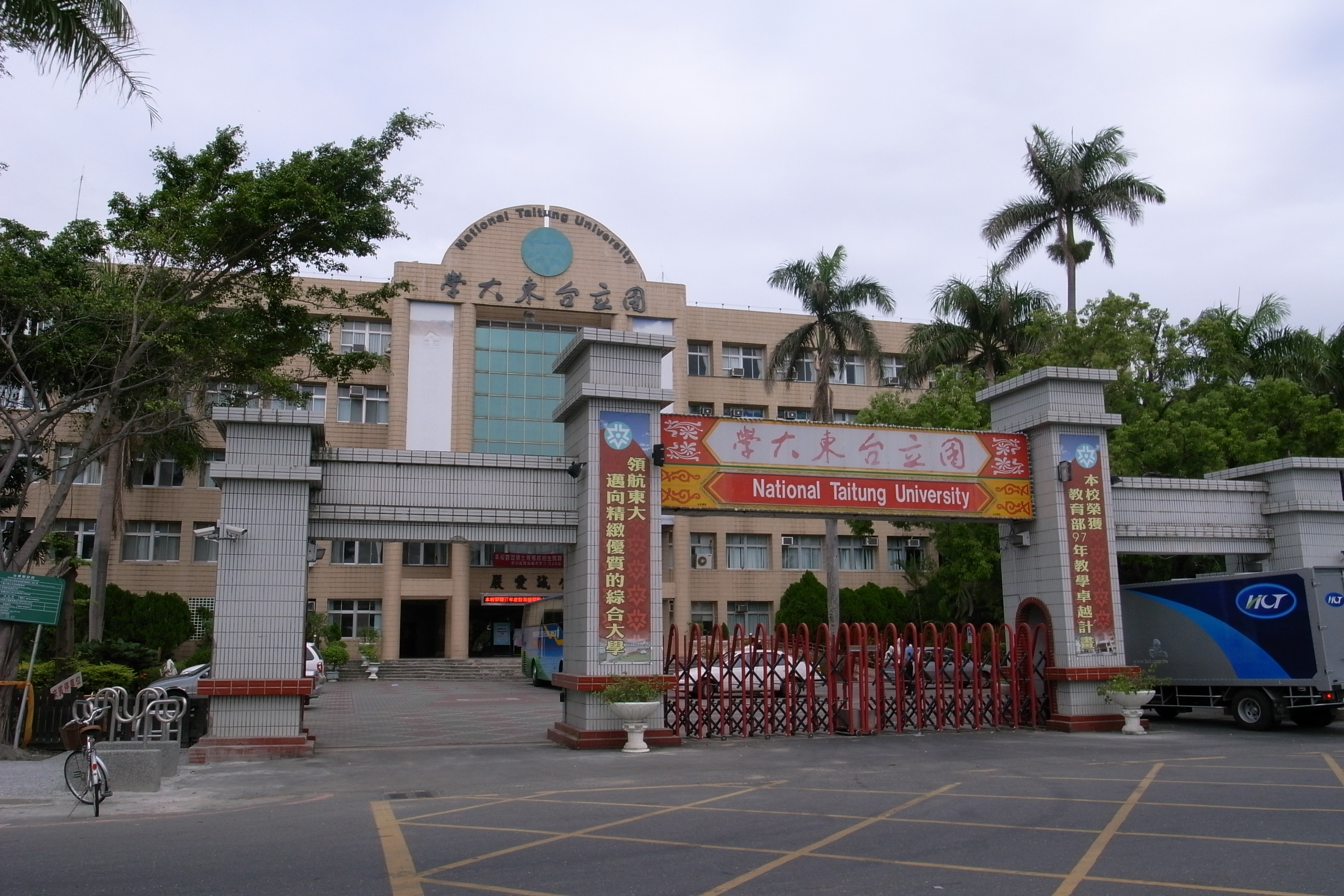
- Type: Public (National)
- Established: 1948 (as Taiwan Provincial Taitung Teachers School); 2003 (as NTTU)
- President: Tzeng Yew-min
- Academic staff: 158
- Students: 3,885
- Undergraduates: 3,547
- Postgraduates: 338
- Location: Taitung City, Taitung County, Taiwan; 22.736°N 121.067°E
- Website: Official website

National Taitung University
- Traditional Chinese: 國立臺東大學
- Simplified Chinese: 国立台东大学
Transcriptions
Standard Mandarin
- Hanyu Pinyin: Guólì Táidōng Dàxué
Southern Min
- Hokkien POJ: Kok-li̍p Tâi-tang Tāi-ha̍k

The National Taitung University (NTTU; Chinese: 國立臺東大學; Pe̍h-ōe-jī: Kok-li̍p Tâi-tang Tāi-ha̍k) is a national university in Taitung City, Taitung County, Taiwan.

NTTU offers a range of undergraduate and graduate programs in fields such as Indigenous Studies, Environmental Studies, Agricultural Sciences, Engineering, Social Sciences, and Tourism Management.

== History ==
NTTU was originally established in 1948 as Taiwan Provincial Taitung Teachers’ School. In 1969, it was upgraded to Taiwan Provincial Taitung Teachers’ Junior College, to Taiwan Provincial Taitung Teachers’ College in 1987 then to National Taitung Teachers’ College in 1991. Finally in 2003 it was upgraded to National Taitung University.

== Colleges ==
- College of Humanities
- Graduate Institute of Children's Literature
- Department of Somatics and Sport Leisure Industry
- Department of Chinese Language and Literature
- Department of Art Industry
- Department of Music
- English Department
- Department of Public and Cultural Affairs
- Language Center
- Teachers' College
- Department of Education
- Department of Physical Education
- Department of Early Childhood Education
- Department of Special Education
- Department of Education Industry and Digital Media
- Department of Cultural Resources and Leisure Studies
- Bachelor's Program for Athletic Performance
- Special Education Center
- Science Education Center
- College of Science and Engineering
- Department of Applied Science
- Department of Applied Mathematics
- Department of Computer Science and Information Engineering
- Department of Information Science and Management Systems
- Department of Life Science
- Center for General Education
- Center for Teacher Education and Professional Advancement
- Center for Austronesian Culture

== Library ==
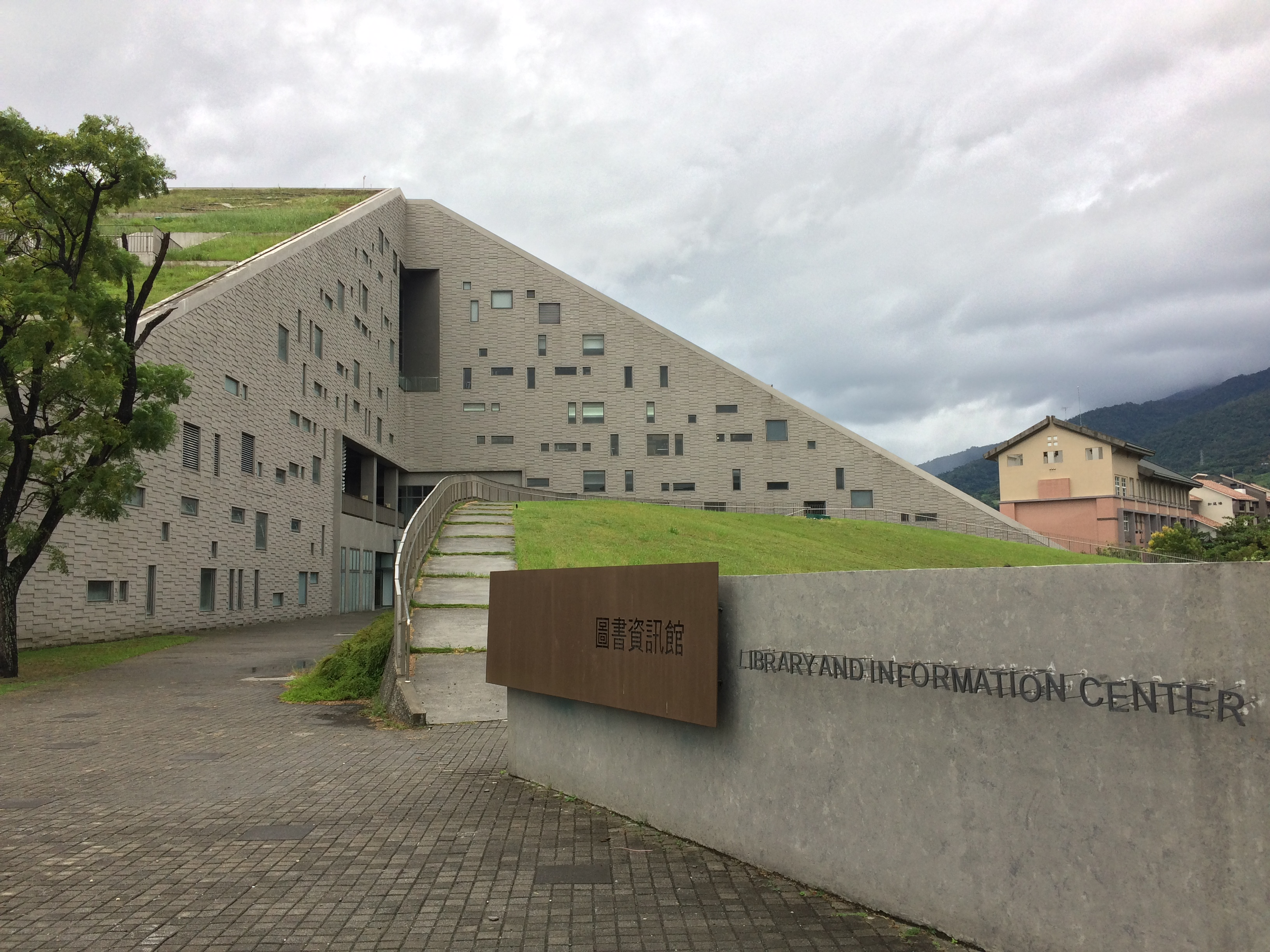
National Taitung University Library and Information Center

The National Taitung University Library and Information Center is the current university library and was inaugurated on 8 December 2014.

== Transportation ==
The main campus of the university is located north of the Zhiben Station of the Taiwan Railway. The Taitung City campus is located near the Taitung Station.

== See also ==
- List of universities in Taiwan
- Huang Ching-ya, alumna
