= National Taitung University Library and Information Center =

Academic library in Taitung City, Taitung County, Taiwan

National Taitung University Library and Information Center 國立臺東大學圖書資訊館
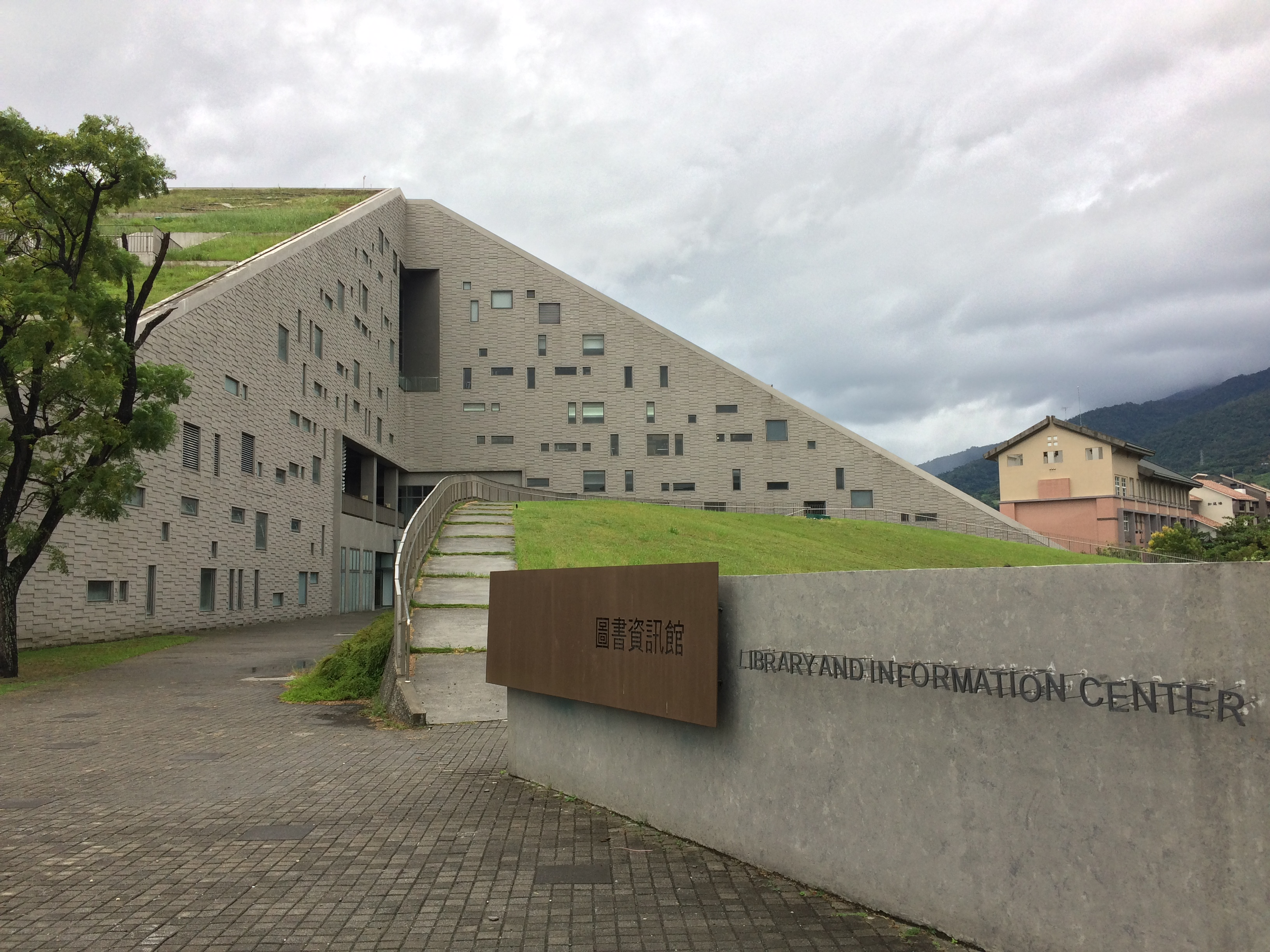
- 22°44′08.9″N 121°04′03.8″E
- Location: Taitung City, Taitung County, Taiwan
- Type: academic library
- Established: 8 December 2014

Other information
- Website: Official website (in Chinese)

The National Taitung University Library and Information Center (traditional Chinese: 國立臺東大學圖書資訊館; simplified Chinese: 国立台东大学图书资讯馆; pinyin: Guólì Táidōng Dàxué Túshū Zīxùn Guǎn) is the academic library of National Taitung University in Taitung City, Taitung County, Taiwan.

== History ==
The library was inaugurated on 8 December 2014 after being constructed with a cost of NT$460 million.

== Architecture ==
The shape of the library resembles a pyramid with elements of mountains and ocean. Its roof is filled with grass. It has a total floor area of 13,000 m^{2} with 6,500 m^{2} reading area.

== Awards ==
- FIABCI World Prix d’Excellence Award for Public Infrastructure Amenities (2019)
- Architizer.com one of the eight most special libraries in the world

== See also ==
- Education in Taiwan
