= Checker Superba =

Motor vehicle

Overview
- Manufacturer: Checker Motors Corporation
- Production: 1959–1963
- Assembly: United States: Kalamazoo, Michigan

Body and chassis
- Class: Mid-size car
- Body style: 4-door sedan 5-door station wagon
- Layout: FR layout
- Related: Checker Marathon

The Checker Superba was an automobile produced by Checker Motors Company of Kalamazoo, Michigan, between 1959 and 1963. The Superba used the Checker taxi cab bodies and were produced in two trim lines, standard and Custom, both in two body styles, a four-door sedan and a five-door station wagon.

Two Continental-built 6-cylinder engines were offered, one with an L-head (95 horsepower), the other with overhead valves (125 horsepower).

On the exterior of the Superba, the grille was composed of an arched center section, flanked two-chrome wings; engine compartment ventilation was through 24 rectangular sections located in the center of the grille. Parking lights were placed on two solid panels flanking the ventilation spaces and housed in round star-like housings. When the Checker Marathon was introduced in the fall of 1959 it was only marketed in New York and the states of New England. In February 1960 the Checker was introduced nationally.

In 1962, the Superba received its only exterior change, a more sculptured front bumper raised up several inches. Additionally front fenders sculpturing was raised three inches. Larger rear wheel openings were increased on the rear fenders. The Starburst grille was replaced with a full-width egg-crate grille. Otherwise the car's appearance was exactly as it was when introduced in 1959.

Total production of the Superba in its first year (1,050 units) was very limited compared to even the weakest full-line United States automaker at the time, Studebaker.
