= Autofeather =

Engine feature

Autofeather is a feature of the engines on some turboprop and piston engine aircraft. When the power being produced by the engine drops to the point where it is not contributing to thrust, the propeller will go into a feathered mode to reduce drag.

The auto feather system also allows pilots to reduce the drag of the propellers during an engine failure, therefore, allowing the plane to glide for a longer period of time.

An automatic feathering system was first introduced on the Martin 4-0-4 aircraft, a piston engine airplane. The system was designed to automatically feather an engine that failed during takeoff or initial climb. It is not used during cruise.
