= Checker Marathon =

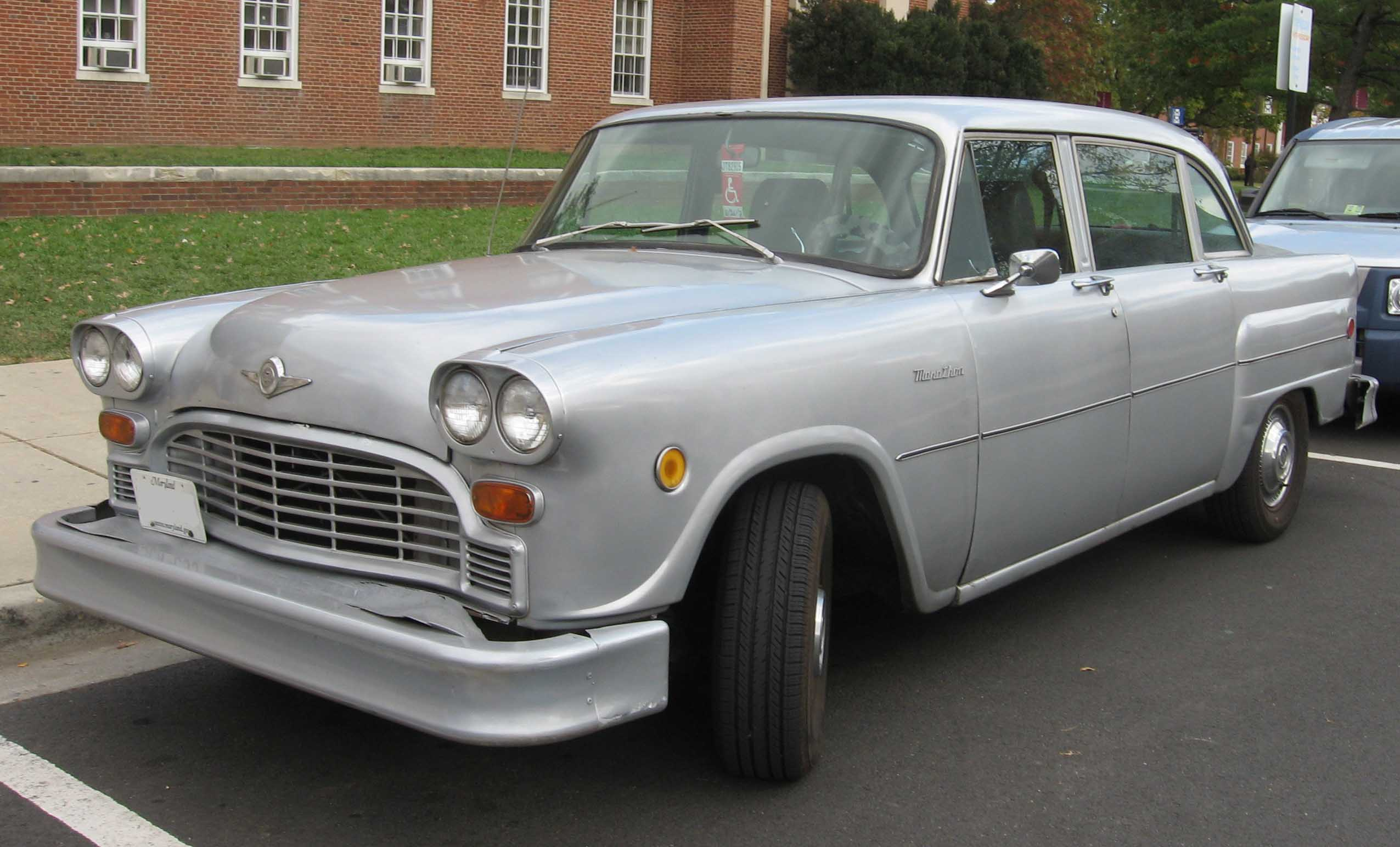
- Checker Marathon sedan

Overview
- Manufacturer: Checker Motors Corporation
- Production: September 1960–1982
- Model years: 1961–1982
- Assembly: United States: Kalamazoo, Michigan
- Designer: Ray Dietrich

Body and chassis
- Class: Mid-size car
- Body style: 4-door sedan 5-door station wagon
- Layout: FR layout
- Related: Checker Superba; Checker Aerobus

Powertrain
- Engine: 3.7L L-head I6; 3.7L, 3.8L, 4.1L OHV I6; 3.7L OHV V6; 4.4L, 4.6L, 5.0L, 5.3L, 5.7L OHV V8
- Transmission: 3-speed TH400 automatic (column); 3-speed manual (column)

Dimensions
- Wheelbase: 120 in (3,048 mm); 129 in (3,277 mm) (limousine)

The Checker Marathon is an automobile which was produced by the Checker Motors Corporation of Kalamazoo, Michigan, between 1960 and 1982. It was marketed as a passenger car for consumers, as opposed to the similar Taxi, which was aimed at fleet buyers.

== History ==
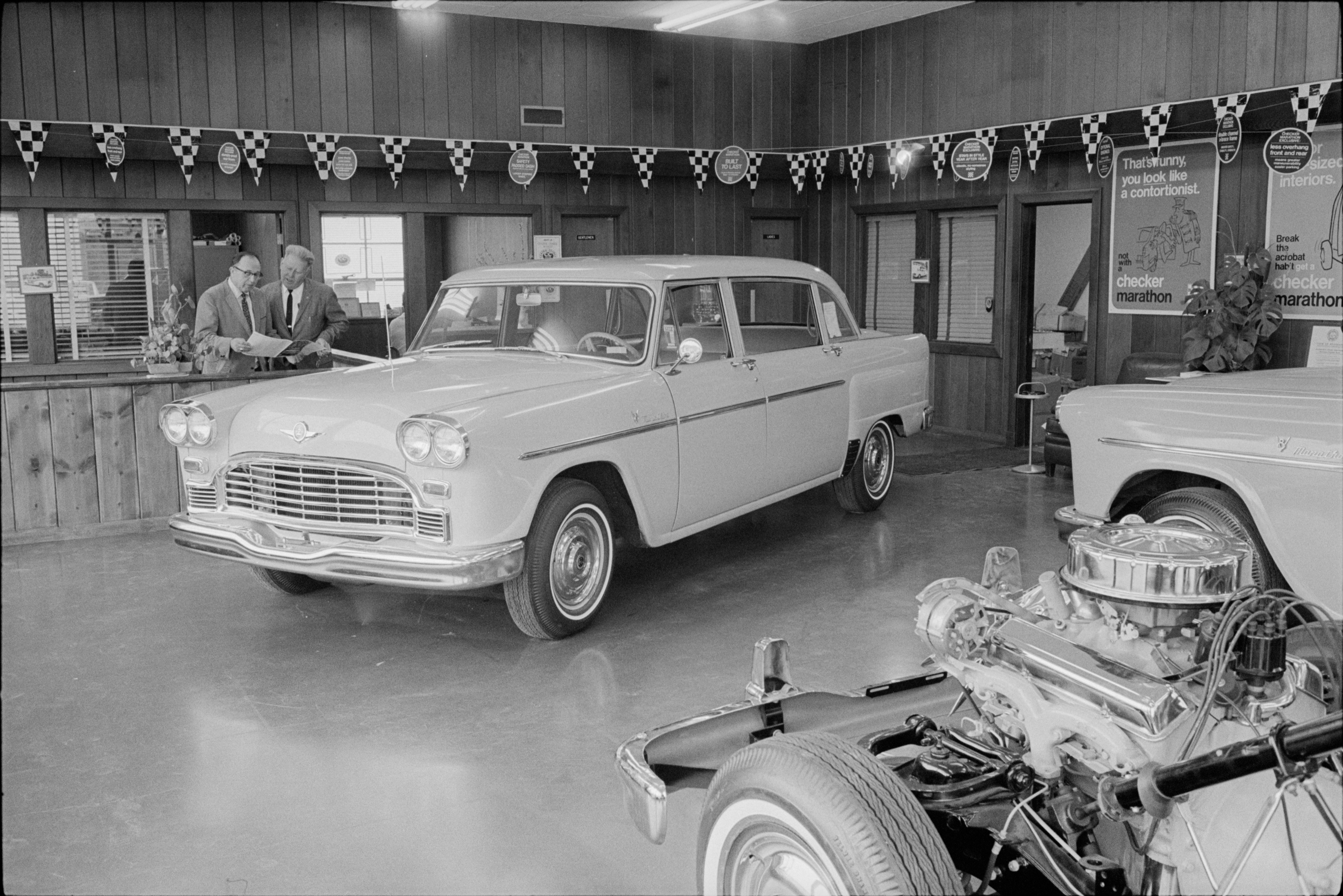
The floor of a Checker dealership in Washington D.C., 1967

Marathons were produced in both four-door sedan and four-door station wagon forms, and the rarer six-door 9-seater and eight-door, 12-seater "Aerobus" sedans and wagons.

The Marathon was introduced in September 1960 for the 1961 model year, alongside, and later superseding, the Checker Superba Custom and differing from the Superba with its better interior appointments. Originally, it retained the Superba's A10 body code, whereas A9 was the code used for taxis. The exterior of the Marathon had a full-width egg-crate grille, differing from the Superba's narrower grille and inboard parking lights.

After a minor facelift for 1963, chassis codes changed to A11 for taxis and A12 for passenger versions. Also in 1963, the Marathon Town Custom, a limousine version on a longer (129 versus 120 in) wheelbase appeared. This version, which seated eight, received the A19E chassis code. A few years later, this was changed to A12E.

Checker did not have a nationwide dealer network and sold most of its production for fleet service.

=== Technical changes ===
With the exception of United States government-mandated 5 mph bumpers in 1974 and ongoing mechanical changes, the Marathon remained virtually unchanged during its 21-year production run. However, Checker did comply with all safety and emissions requirements while in production. Notably, the Marathon's front suspension A-frames interchange with a 1956 Ford.

Some of these changes help in identifying the year of a Checker, and included:

- 1963: Front parking/directional lamps changed from white to amber
- 1964: Standard front lap belts
- 1964: Mid year change happened on engines and front frame. Early 1964 Continental inline-6 to Late 1964 Chevrolet OHV-6 and small-block V8s
- 1966: Standard front and rear lap belts
- 1967: Interior safety package, including energy-absorbing steering column and wheel, padded dash, recessed knobs
- 1967: Dual-chamber brake master cylinder
- 1969: Side marker reflectors on all fenders, amber in front, red in rear
- 1970: Side marker lamps on all fenders, amber in front, red in rear (round on all Checkers)
- 1968: Front shoulder belts for outboard passengers
- 1969: Headrests
- 1970: Locking steering column (Checker used full-size Chevrolet steering columns and wheels)
- 1974: Larger, heavier silver-painted "girder"-style bumpers
- 1975: Catalytic converter required unleaded fuel
- 1976: Radiator (AMC Matador), engine (Chevy 350 V8 2-barrel carb, cylinders were over-bored, requiring larger pistons and rings), transmission (TH 400: Turbo Hydra-Matic), differential (Spicer 44), front lower A-frame (Ford 56 Thunderbird), front upper A-frame (63 Lincoln Continental), steering was rear drag link until 1980, pitman arm bushing tends to loosen and should be tightened every 10k miles.
- 1978: Parallel action windshield wipers introduced
- 1978: New "Delta"-style Chevrolet steering wheel (sans the Chevrolet bowtie)

=== End of Production ===
The final Marathon was manufactured in 1982, when Checker exited the automobile manufacturing business. In 1983 Checker started a remanufacturing operation at the Kalamazoo Cab Services division. Checker continued remanufacturing cabs as late as 1997. The company continued operations for an additional 27 years producing body stampings for General Motors, Ford, and Chrysler, until January 2009, when it entered bankruptcy liquidation as a result of the downturn in the USA auto industry.

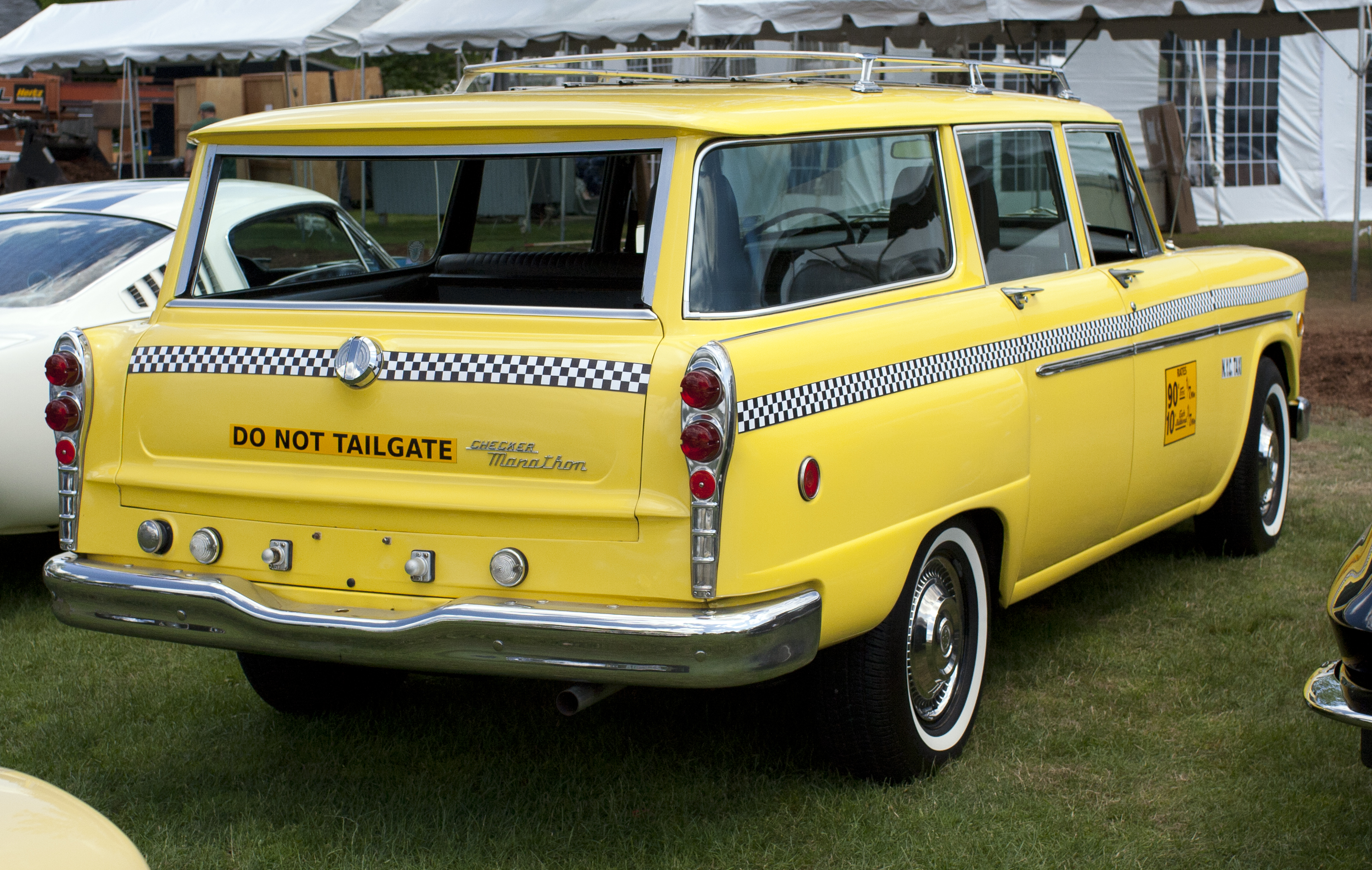
1971 Checker Marathon wagon

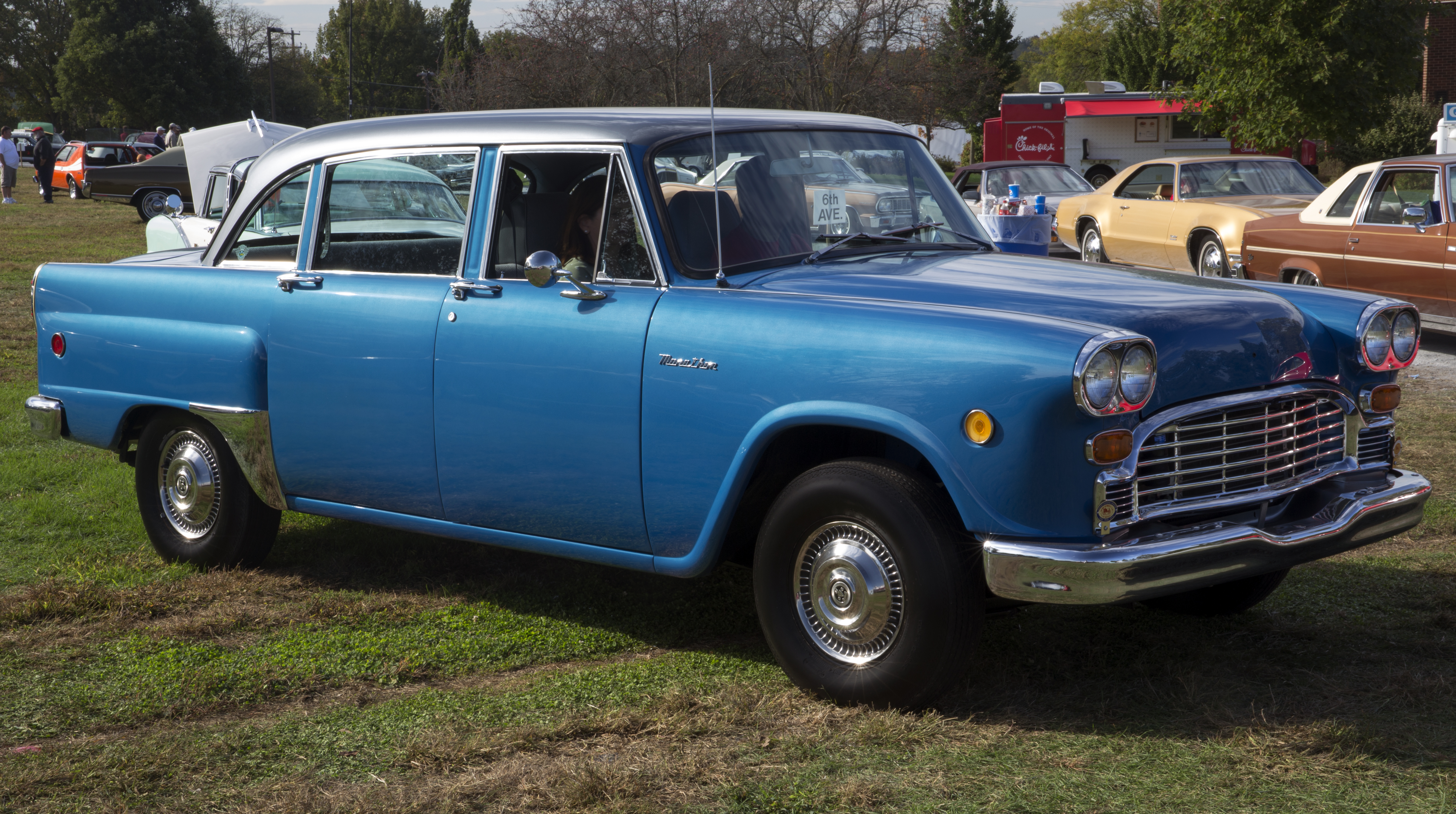
1972 Checker A12 Marathon sedan

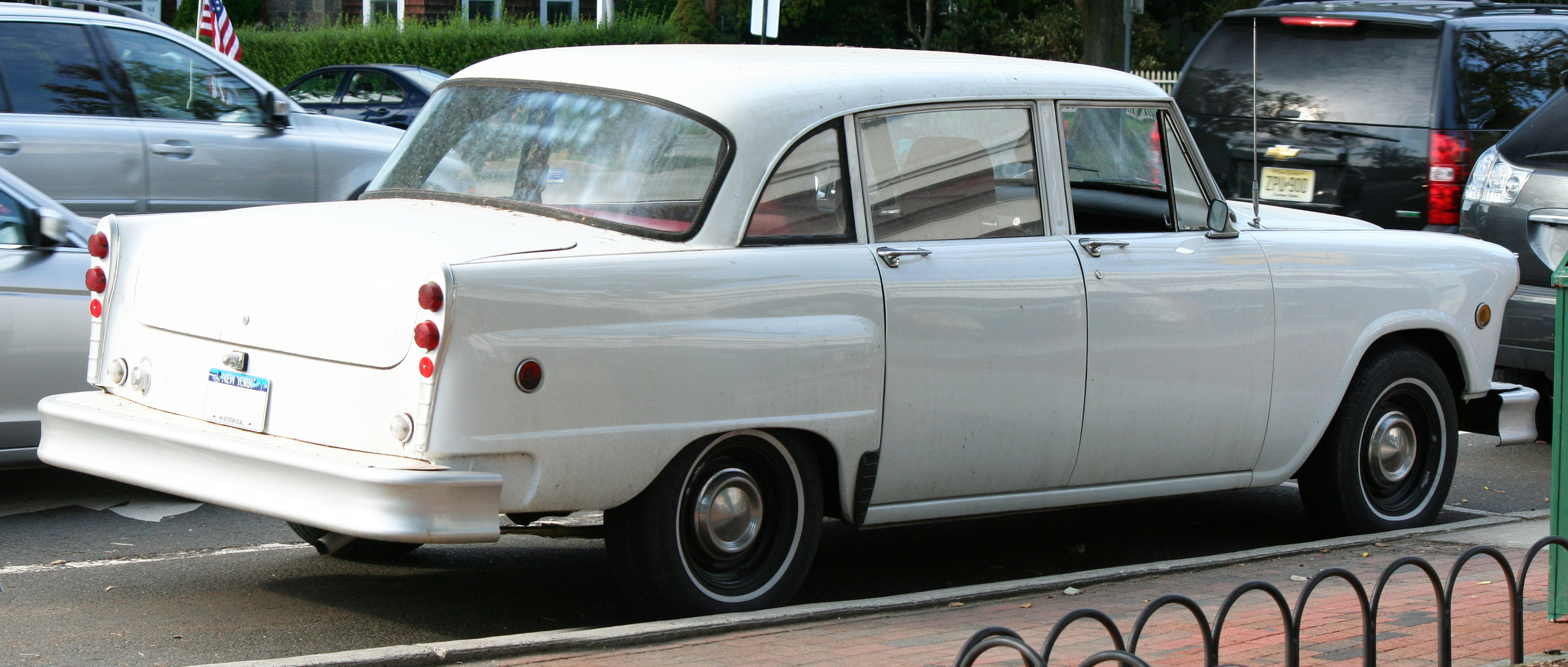
1975 Checker A12 Marathon sedan

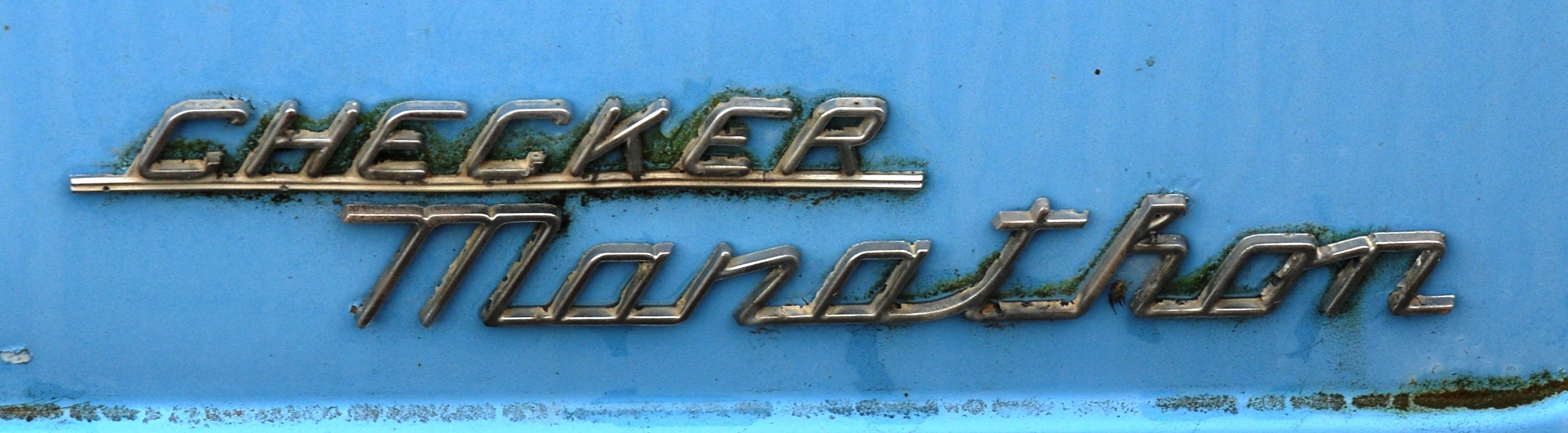
Checker Marathon badge

== Fleet usage ==
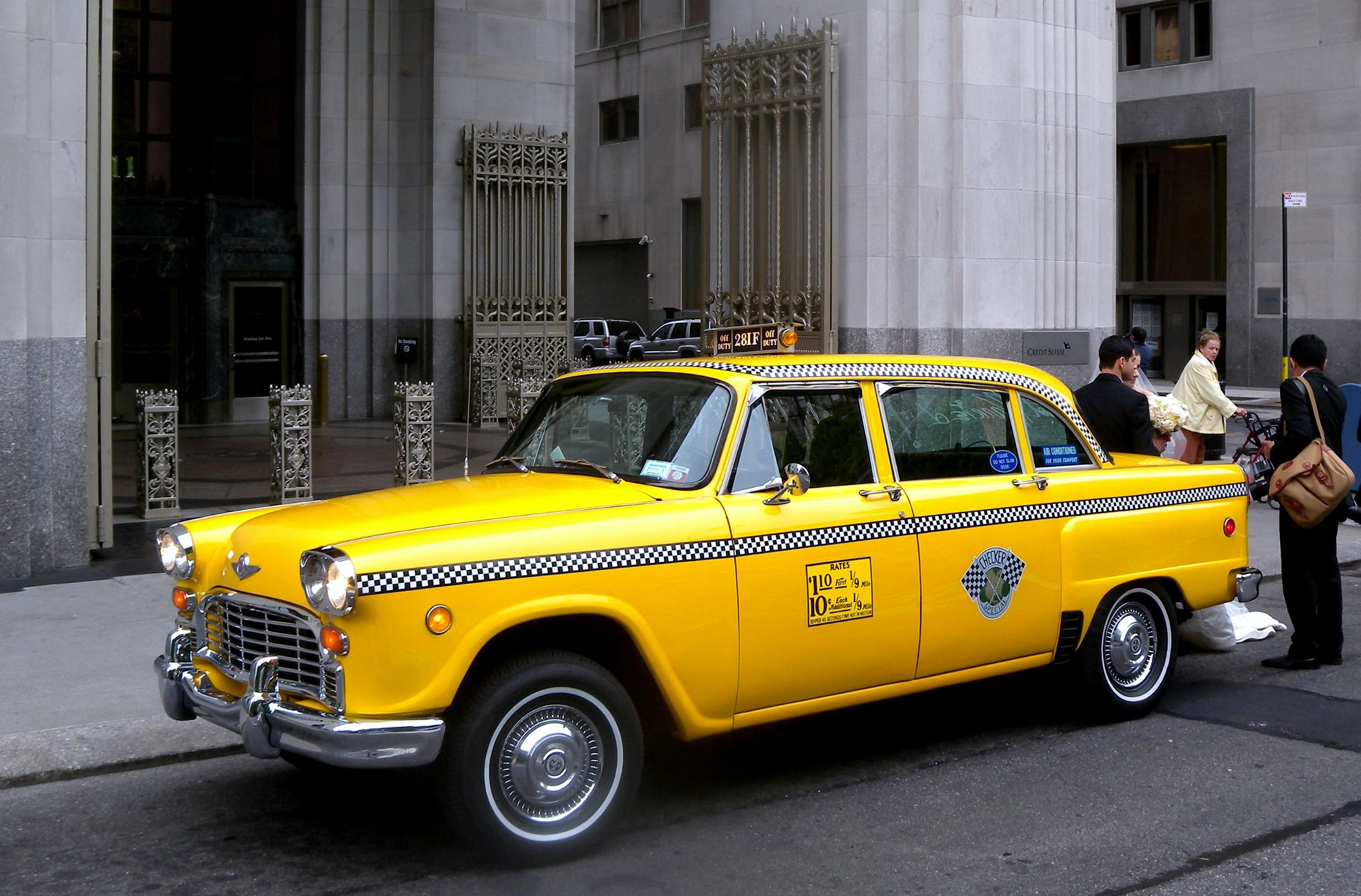
A restored Checker Marathon taxi in use as a wedding car

=== New York City ===
For decades, Checker was the taxicab of choice for New York City and many other American cities. The size of the car (seating many passengers), the robust construction, the lack of yearly changes to the styling (especially the 1958 and later models, simplifying parts management), and the bolt-on rear quarter panels all contributed to the Marathon's ubiquity on the streets of Manhattan.

The last New York City Checker cab retired in 1999, operated by Earl Johnson from 1978 onwards. The Marathon covered nearly one million miles and had three engine replacements over the years.

Most films set in New York City in the 1960s, 1970s, and 1980s will show a Checker Marathon. Many movies set in the 1950s and 1960s use Checker cabs built in the 1970s and early 1980s, since the bodies were virtually the same, and due to the lack of usable early specimens. Also, in works depicting the Soviet Union or East Bloc countries, such as the film Gorky Park and the original Mission: Impossible television series, Checker Marathons were used to depict Soviet-made GAZ-13 Chaika automobiles.

=== Kalamazoo ===
Apart from taxicab use, Marathons were also bought by police departments, most notably in Kalamazoo, where Checker had its factory.

=== The Vatican ===
In the late 1960s and into the early 1970s, some black SCV-plated (Stato Città del Vaticano - Vatican City) A12 Marathons were used to accommodate Pope Paul VI's entourage in motorcades.

== Engines ==
The engines used were originally Continental-built L-head inline-sixes (OHV units for the wagons), but these were exchanged for Chevrolet sixes and small-block V8s for the 1965 model year. These continued to change as Chevrolet introduced modifications, peaking with the 1969 L-48 350 V8 which produced 300 hp (224 kW) (gross). In 1969 the Perkins 4.236, a 3.9 L (236 cu in) naturally aspirated, four-cylinder diesel engine was available as an option for all models, but for only one year. By 1973, power for the 350 had decreased to 145 hp (108 kW) and in 1975 catalytic converters were introduced. For 1980, the engine lineup was changed entirely, with a 3.8-litre V6 replacing the old inline unit, and a smaller 4.4 L (267 cu in) standard V8. The big news was the Oldsmobile LF9 engine, a 5.7 L (350 cu in) diesel V8.

Six-cylinder engines
Model Years	Layout	Size	Fuel system	Power	Origin	Notes
1961–1964	L-head I6	226 cu in (3,707 cc)	single carb	80 hp (60 kW) at 3,100 rpm	Continental	Sedans only until 1963
1961–1962	OHV I6	226 cu in (3,707 cc)	single carb	122 hp (91 kW) at 4,000 rpm	Continental	Station Wagon only
1963–1964	OHV I6	226 cu in (3,707 cc)	2-bbl carb	141 hp (105 kW) at 4,400 rpm	Continental	$57 option
1965–1968	OHV I6	230 cu in (3,769 cc)	single carb	140 hp (104 kW) at 4,400 rpm	Chevrolet	base
1969–1970	OHV I6	250 cu in (4,095 cc)	2-bbl carb	155 hp (116 kW) at 4,200 rpm	Chevrolet	base
1971–1972	OHV I6	250 cu in (4,095 cc)	2-bbl carb	145 hp (108 kW) at 4,200 rpm	Chevrolet	110 hp SAE net
1973–1975	OHV I6	250 cu in (4,095 cc)	2-bbl carb	100 hp (75 kW) at 3,600 rpm	Chevrolet	low-comp, EGR
1976	OHV I6	250 cu in (4,095 cc)	single carb	105 hp (78 kW) at 3,800 rpm	Chevrolet	8.2:1
1977–1979	OHV I6	250 cu in (4,095 cc)	single carb	110 hp (82 kW) at 3,800 rpm	Chevrolet	8.3:1
1980	OHV V6	229 cu in (3,751 cc)	2-bbl carb	115 hp (86 kW) at 4,000 rpm	Chevrolet	
1981–1982	OHV V6	229 cu in (3,751 cc)	2-bbl carb	110 hp (82 kW) at 4,200 rpm	Chevrolet	LC3, electronic feedback carb (Rochester DualJet)
V8 engines
1965–1967	OHV V8	283 cu in (4,638 cc)	2-bbl carb	195 hp (145 kW) at 4,800 rpm	Chevrolet	
1966–1968	OHV V8	327 cu in (5,354 cc)	4-bbl carb	250 hp (186 kW) at 4,400 rpm	Chevrolet	10.5:1
1969	OHV V8	327 cu in (5,354 cc)	4-bbl carb	235 hp (175 kW) at 4,800 rpm	Chevrolet	9.0:1
1968	OHV V8	307 cu in (5,025 cc)	2-bbl carb	200 hp (149 kW) at 4,600 rpm	Chevrolet	
1969	OHV V8	350 cu in (5,733 cc)	4-bbl carb	300 hp (224 kW) at 4,800 rpm	Chevrolet	10.25:1
1970	OHV V8	350 cu in (5,733 cc)	4-bbl carb	250 hp (186 kW) at 4,500 rpm	Chevrolet	9.0:1
1971–1972	OHV V8	350 cu in (5,733 cc)	4-bbl carb	245 hp (183 kW) at 4,800 rpm	Chevrolet	9.0:1, 165 hp SAE net
1973–1976	OHV V8	350 cu in (5,733 cc)	2-bbl carb	145 hp (108 kW) at 4,000 rpm 145 hp (108 kW) at 3,800 rpm	Chevrolet	8.5:1, EGR catalyzed from 1975
1977	OHV V8	350 cu in (5,733 cc)	4-bbl carb	170 hp (127 kW) at 3,800 rpm	Chevrolet	8.5:1
1978–1979	OHV V8	350 cu in (5,733 cc)	4-bbl carb	160 hp (119 kW) at 3,800 rpm	Chevrolet	8.2:1
1977–1979	OHV V8	305 cu in (4,999 cc)	2-bbl carb	145 hp (108 kW) at 3,800 rpm	Chevrolet	8.5:1, 8.4:1 after 1978
1980	OHV V8	305 cu in (4,999 cc)	2-bbl carb	155 hp (116 kW) at 4,000 rpm	Chevrolet	8.6:1
1981	OHV V8	305 cu in (4,999 cc)	2-bbl carb	150 hp (112 kW) at 3,800 rpm	Chevrolet	8.6:1, higher torque (LG4)
1980	OHV V8	268 cu in (4,390 cc)	2-bbl carb	120 hp (89 kW) at 3,600 rpm	Chevrolet	
1981–1982	OHV V8	268 cu in (4,390 cc)	2-bbl carb	115 hp (86 kW) at 4,000 rpm	Chevrolet	L39, electronic feedback carb (Rochester DualJet)
Diesel engines
1969	OHV I4	236 cu in (3,863 cc)	diesel	82 hp (61 kW) at 2,800 rpm	Perkins	
1980	OHV V8	350 cu in (5,737 cc)	diesel	125 hp (93 kW) at 3,600 rpm	Oldsmobile	
1981–1982	OHV V8	350 cu in (5,737 cc)	diesel	105 hp (78 kW) at 3,200 rpm	Oldsmobile	improved "DX" version (LF9)
: SAE gross figures, others are SAE net
