= Checker Aerobus =

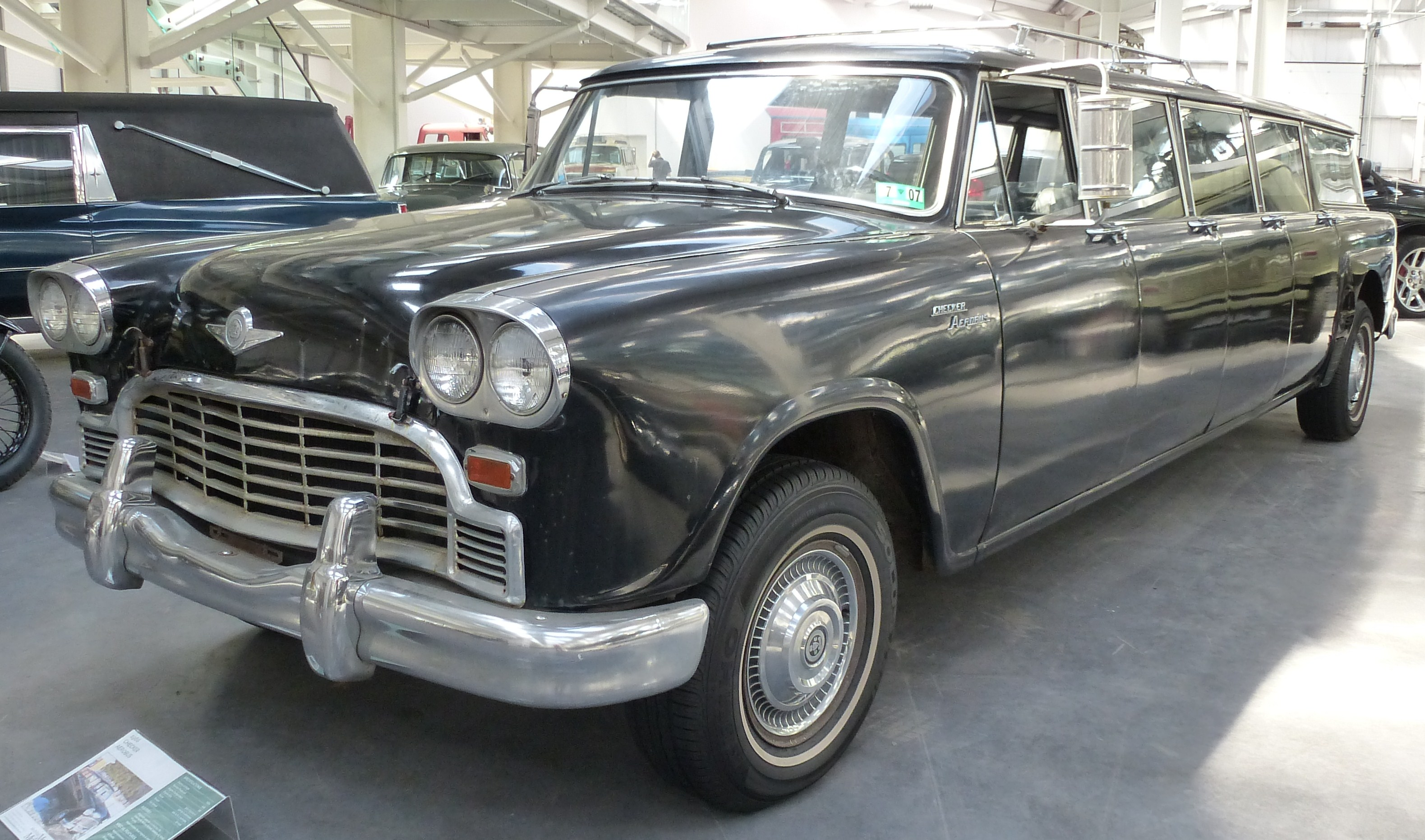

Overview
- Manufacturer: Checker Motors Corporation
- Also called: Checker Convoy
- Production: 1962–1977
- Assembly: United States: Kalamazoo, Michigan

Body and chassis
- Class: Full-size limousine
- Body style: 6/8-door sedan 7/9-door station wagon
- Layout: Front-engine, rear-wheel drive
- Related: Checker Marathon

Powertrain
- Engine: 5.2 L A318 Chrysler V8; 5.4 L 327 Chevrolet V8; 5.7 L 350 Chevrolet V8
- Transmission: 3-speed manual 3-speed automatic

Dimensions
- Wheelbase: 154.5 in (3,924 mm); 189 in (4,801 mm)
- Length: 235.5 in (5,982 mm); 269.75 in (6,852 mm)
- Width: 76 in (1,930 mm)
- Height: 62 in (1,581 mm)
- Curb weight: 2,010–2,305 kg (4,431–5,082 lb)

The Checker Aerobus is an automobile manufactured on two different wheelbases by the Checker Motors Corporation from 1962 until 1977. Meant primarily to serve as an airport shuttle, as indicated by the name, it is an extended version of the iconic Checker Marathon. A total of 3,568 Checker Aerobuses of all versions were built.

== Technical specifications ==
It was offered as seven- (including the tailgate) or nine-door station wagon (A12W), and as a six- or eight-door sedan (A12E) The shorter wheelbases seated 9 people, while the longer models seated 12 people and their luggage.

Unlike the standard Marathon (which used a Continental straight-six), early cars used Chrysler's A318 V8 (5.2 L), originally with 190 hp (142 kW) and later 200 hp (149 kW). At the same time as the Marathon switched to a Chevrolet straight-six in 1965, the Aerobus switched to Chevrolet's 327 cu in (5.36 L) small-block engine, with 185 hp (138 kW) at 4,400 rpm. This was in a lesser state of tune than the 250 hp (186 kW) unit used in the regular Marathons, with lower 8:1 compression and a two-barrel rather than a four-barrel carburetor. Top speed was around 84 mph (135 km/h). The rear wheel cutouts were radiused, unlike the sedans.

Standard equipment for 1966 included three-speed manual transmission, power brakes, windshield washer, and a front stabilizer bar. For 1969, the bigger 350 engine (5.7 L) took over, with 200 hp. Output climbed to 215 hp (160 kW) for 1971, or 155 hp (116 kW) SAE net.

By 1974, intended to be the last year for the Aerobus as Checker ended production of the station wagons, the power was increased to 160 hp (119 kW), using a four-barrel carb instead of the two-barrel seen in the Marathons. Available only with an automatic and with standard power steering, top speed for a 1974 is 99 mph (160 km/h).

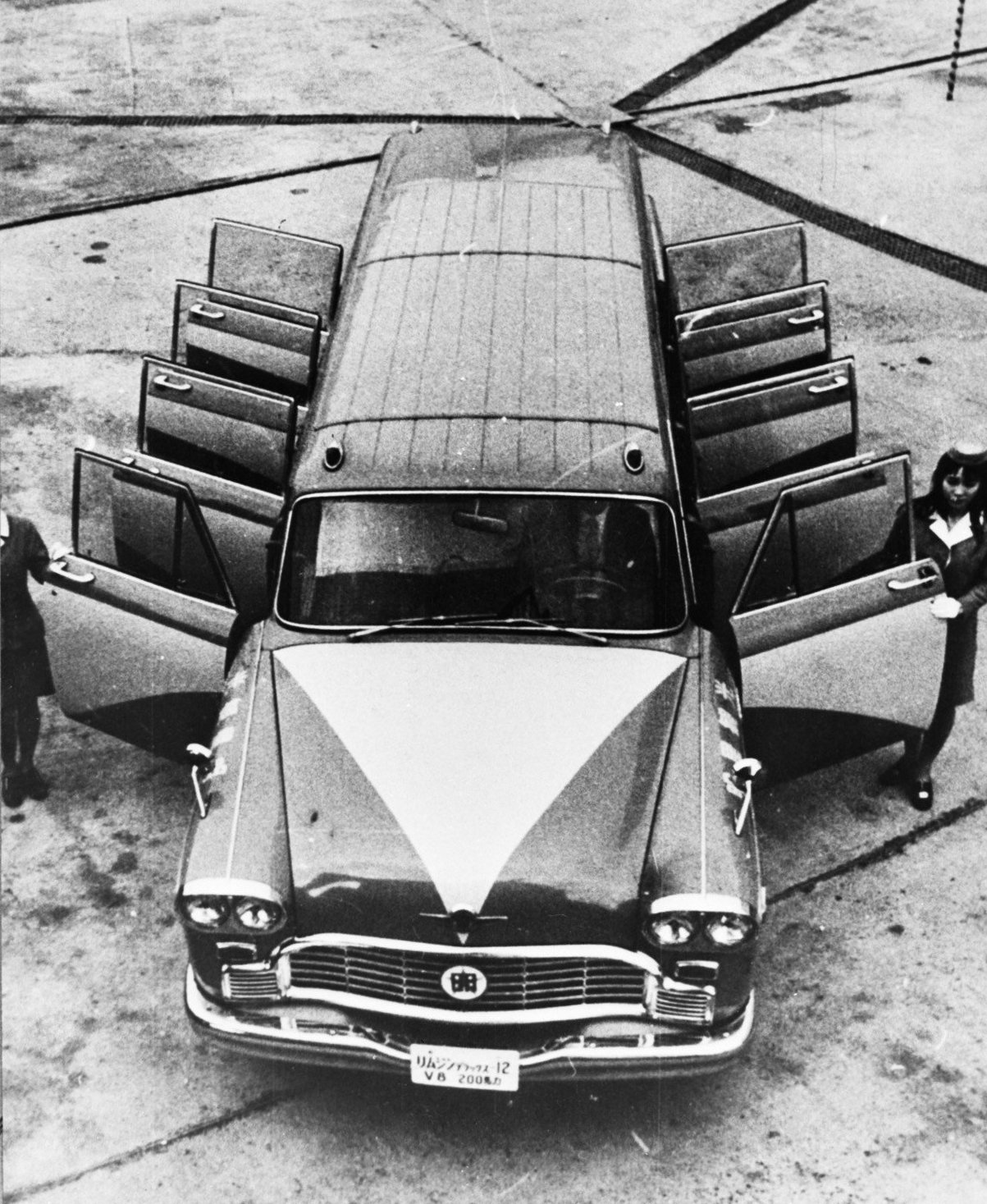
Twelve-passenger Aerobus, 1970

== Special models ==
=== Convoy ===
Marketing material mentioned a special prisoner transport version of the Aerobus called the Convoy ("a twelve passenger security van"). The front passenger seat was rear-facing for a guard, and there was a security screen between the front compartment and the rear. Three bench seats were arranged in the rear, two along the side and one forward facing. No evidence exists of any Convoys actually being sold.

=== Ambulance ===
An artist rendering of a possible Aerobus Ambulance shows that Checker was interested in catering to the medical transport market. The depiction shows a short wheelbase station wagon (six-door) body, with the rear most doors closed off with extended rear fenders. The advertisement included a coupon to mail back to the company with expressed interest. As there is no record of any ambulance being built, it appears that there was little interest.

=== Aerobus 15 ===
After building no Aerobus models in 1975, Checker realized that there still was a market for extended Marathon based vehicles. The Aerobus 15 was the result, being based on the long-wheelbase standard Marathon A12E sedan (with a 9-inch longer rear door). This allowed room for jump-seats ahead of the last row of seating, increasing the carrying capacity to 15 people. Additionally, the rear-axle was of a heavy-duty truck style with 8-lugs. A total of 60 were built in 1976, and a further 47 were built in 1977.

== End of production ==
Production of the short-wheelbase versions, always considerably lower than the longer ones, ended with the 1969 model year. The final Aerobus 15 models ended production in 1977 and no further extended length Checkers were produced.
