= Yellow cab =

Style of taxicab

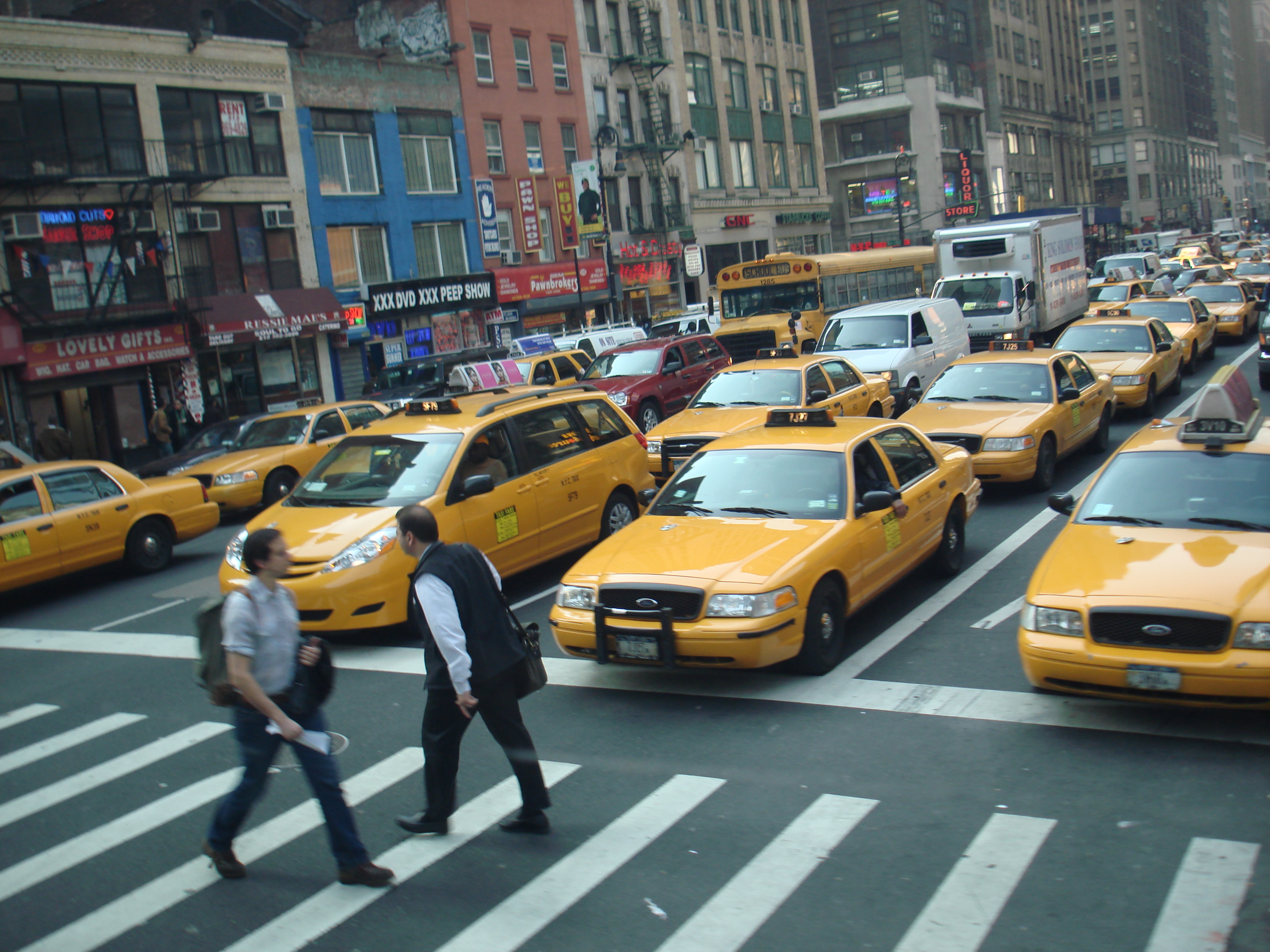
Yellow cabs in New York City taxi

Yellow cab taxicab operators exist all around the world (some with common heritage, some without). The original Yellow Cab Company, based in Chicago, Illinois, was one of the largest taxicab companies in the United States.

== History ==
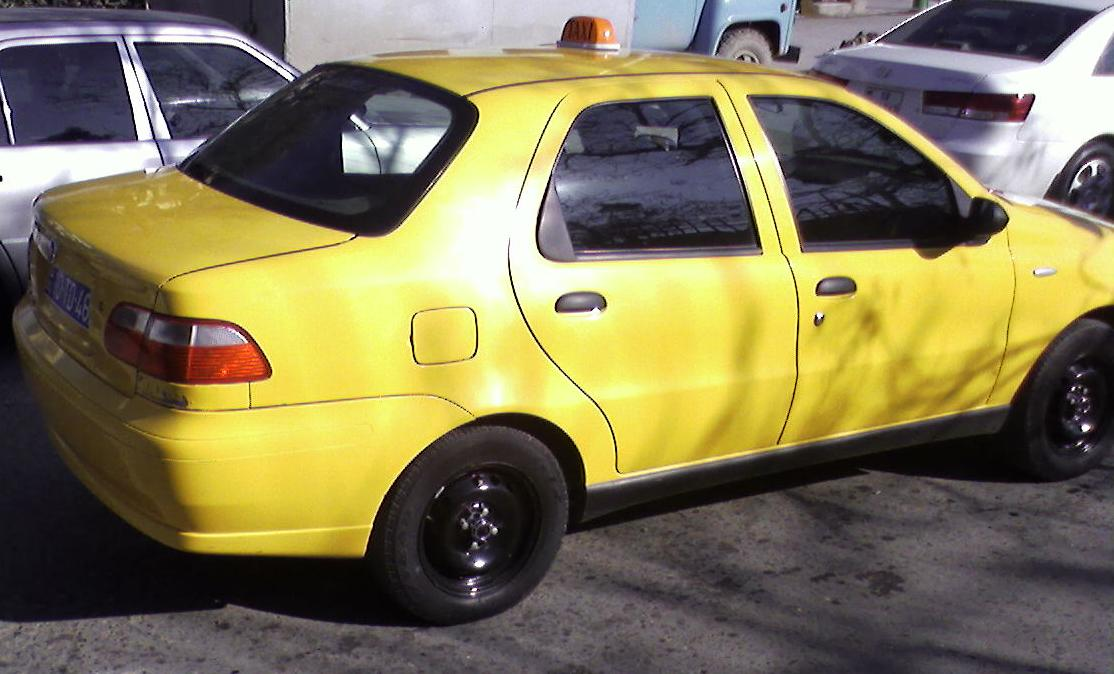
One of the historical yellow taxis in Baku, Azerbaijan, that were replaced with violet cabs in 2011

Yellow cabs originally referred to horse-drawn carriages that were yellow colored. The exact term dates back to at least 1798, when the musical comedy, Cabriolet Jaune (Yellow Cab), debuted at Paris' Theatre de l'Opera Comique National.

The automobile Yellow Cab Company of Chicago was founded by John D. Hertz in 1907. Their specially designed taxicabs were powered by a 4-cylinder Continental engine equipped with a purpose-built taxicab body supplied by the Racine Body Co., of Racine, Wisconsin. According to Yellow Cab Co. tradition, the color (and name) yellow was selected by John Hertz as the result of a survey he commissioned at a "local university", which indicated it was the easiest color to spot. However, "he was certainly not the first taxicab operator to use that color and the university study to which B. C. Forbes refers has yet to be discovered." In 2017, a study showed that the color yellow, for taxis, was more noticeable, resulting in 9% fewer accidents.

In 1908, Albert Rockwell, founder and General Manager of the New Departure Manufacturing Co. of Bristol, Connecticut, travelled to Europe to evaluate their taxi systems, hoping to develop a similar one in Washington, D.C. Ernest Wyckoff, Alfred Church and Clarence Partridge, well-known automobile dealers in New York, had a number of orange-yellow colored Rockwell taxicabs operating on Manhattan streets in 1909. By March 1910, the Connecticut Cab Co. (essentially the directors of New Departure Manufacturing Co.) assumed operating control of Wyckoff, Church and Partridge's taxis.

The Yellow Taxicab Co. was incorporated in New York on April 4, 1912. Its fares that year started at 50¢/mile (roughly equivalent to $12.12 in 2016 adjusted for inflation). Among its directors and major stockholders were Albert Rockwell and the Connecticut Cab Co. Shortly after incorporation the Yellow Taxicab Co. merged with the Cab and Taxi Co., and with the strength of Connecticut Cab Co. behind them, the young business assumed a large share of the New York market. Its independent corporate life was fairly short, however, as fare wars and regulations forced a merger with the Mason-Seaman Transportation Co. on March 3, 1914. Shortly after, an injunction was filed by the company, seeking to restrain the city from enforcing the Public Hack ordinances, but it was rejected on appeal. By 1916, the company was being held in receivership, due to suits by numerous creditors.

The Yellow Cab Manufacturing Company was formed in 1920.

== List of cab companies ==
=== Australia ===
- The Yellow Cab Group was founded in 1924 and operates in Queensland and Tasmania.
- Yellow Cabs operate in Melbourne.
- Yellow and Coastal Cabs are in Perth.

=== Canada ===
- The Yellow Cab Company of Vancouver, British Columbia was founded in 1921.
- Yellow Cab Company of Toronto, Ontario.
- Yellow Cab of Burlington, Ontario.
- Yellow Cab of Edmonton, Alberta was purchased and given the Yellow name in 1945.
- Yellow Cab of Halifax, was founded in 1962 and is the largest Yellow Cab brand in Atlantic Canada.
- Yellow Cab of Victoria, British Columbia, formerly Empress Taxi.

=== Greece ===
- Taxis in Athens are required to be yellow since 1987.

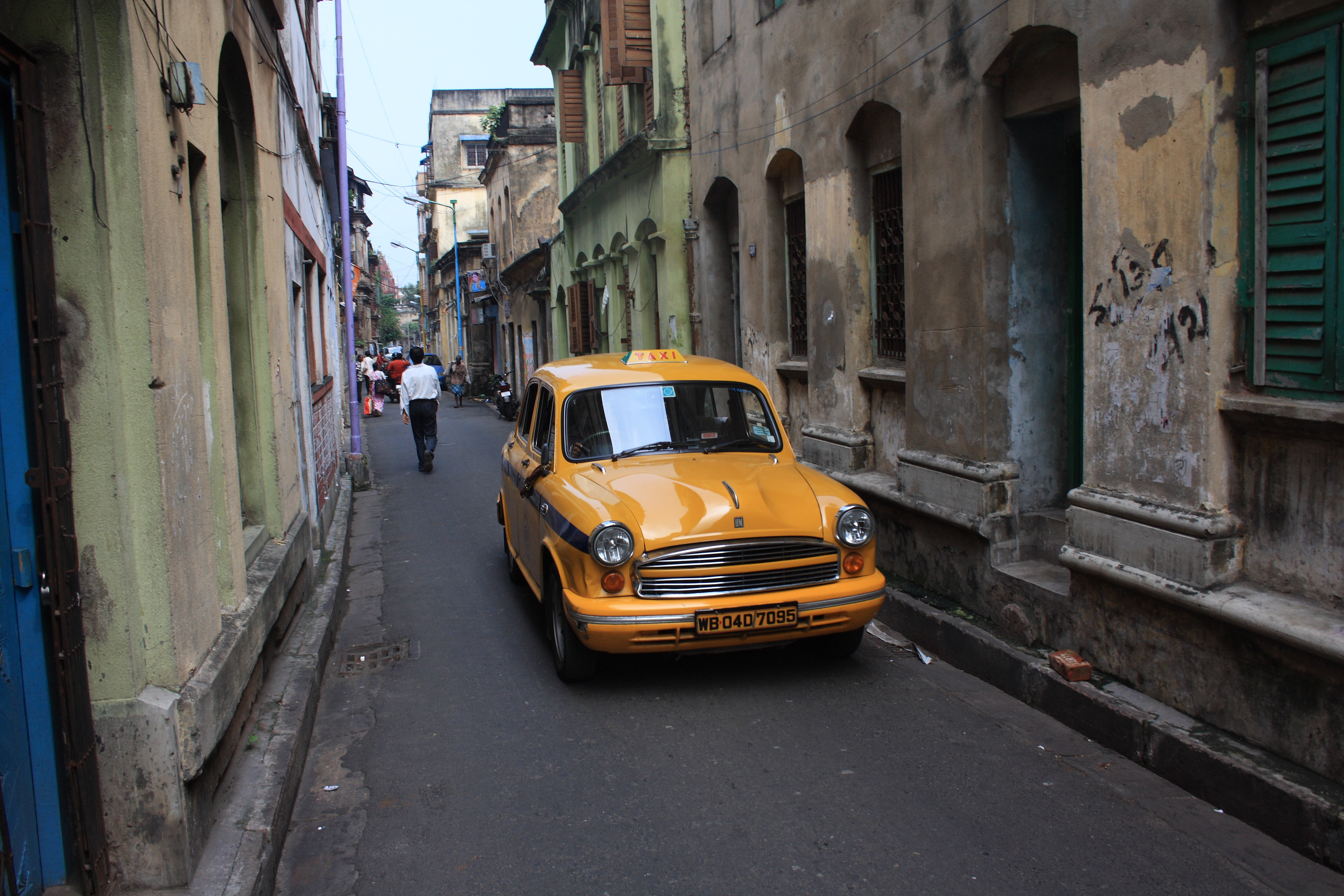
A yellow taxi in Kolkata

=== Hungary ===
- Taxis in Budapest are required to be yellow since 2013.

=== India ===
- Yellow Cab of Hyderabad, India.
- Yellow Taxi of Kolkata, India.
- AssureCabs taxi service for Ahmedabad to Vadodara.

=== Singapore ===
- ComfortDelGro in Singapore.

=== Spain ===
- Taxis in Barcelona are yellow and black since 1929. This is a major exception to the rule of taxi colouring in Spain, with taxis of most cities being white.

=== United Kingdom ===
- Big Yellow Taxi Co. based in northeast Fife, Scotland.

=== United States ===
- The Yellow Cab Company of Baltimore, Maryland, was founded in 1909. It is currently owned by Transdev. (U.S.)
- Yellow Checker Cab of Peoria, Illinois, was founded in 1922 and is the largest taxi fleet in downstate Illinois. (U.S.)
- Yellow Cab Co. in Oklahoma City, Oklahoma, was founded in 1918. It ultimately became Yellow Corporation, a major U.S. truck operator. (U.S.)
- The Yellow Cab Cooperative of San Francisco, California, was founded on November 8, 1977, succeeding a failed private company. (U.S.)
- Yellow Cab of San Diego, California, has been in continuous operation since the 1920s. Yellow Cab of San Diego has since sold all of its vehicles; the company operates now as a radio system only. (U.S.)
- California Yellow Cab, serving Orange County, California, has been in operation for over 60 years. It is owned by Keolis. (U.S.)
- Yellow Cab of Arizona, founded in 1967, serving the entire state of Arizona. (U.S.)
- Yellow Cab Co of Bay Area (U.S.)
- Peter Pan Bus Lines was founded as Yellow Cab Air Line in Springfield, Massachusetts, which was purchased in 1933 by Peter Carmen Picknelly (1891-1964) (U.S.)
- Louisville Transportation Company of Louisville, Kentucky, operates as Yellow Cab as well as Checker Cab and Cardinal Cab. Yellow Cab of Louisville has been in continuous operation since 1893, when it was founded as Louisville Carriage Company. (U.S.)
- Yellow Cab of Buffalo, New York, is part of Liberty Cab.
- Los Angeles Yellow Cab

== In popular culture ==
Yellow cabs are the focus of the films The Yellow Cab Man (1950) starring Red Skelton and the acclaimed Taxi Driver (1976) starring Robert De Niro.

Springfield has taxis with "Skinned-Colored Cab" written on the side in the episode "What Animated Women Want" of The Simpsons because the joke is the cartoon characters' skin is also yellow.

== See also ==
- Taxicabs of New York City
- Taxicabs of the United States
- YELLOW CAB was the callsign of Hapag-Lloyd Express
