= Checker Motors Corporation =

Former vehicle manufacturer company (1922–2010)

- Checker Motors Corporation Logo used in the 1960s through 1982

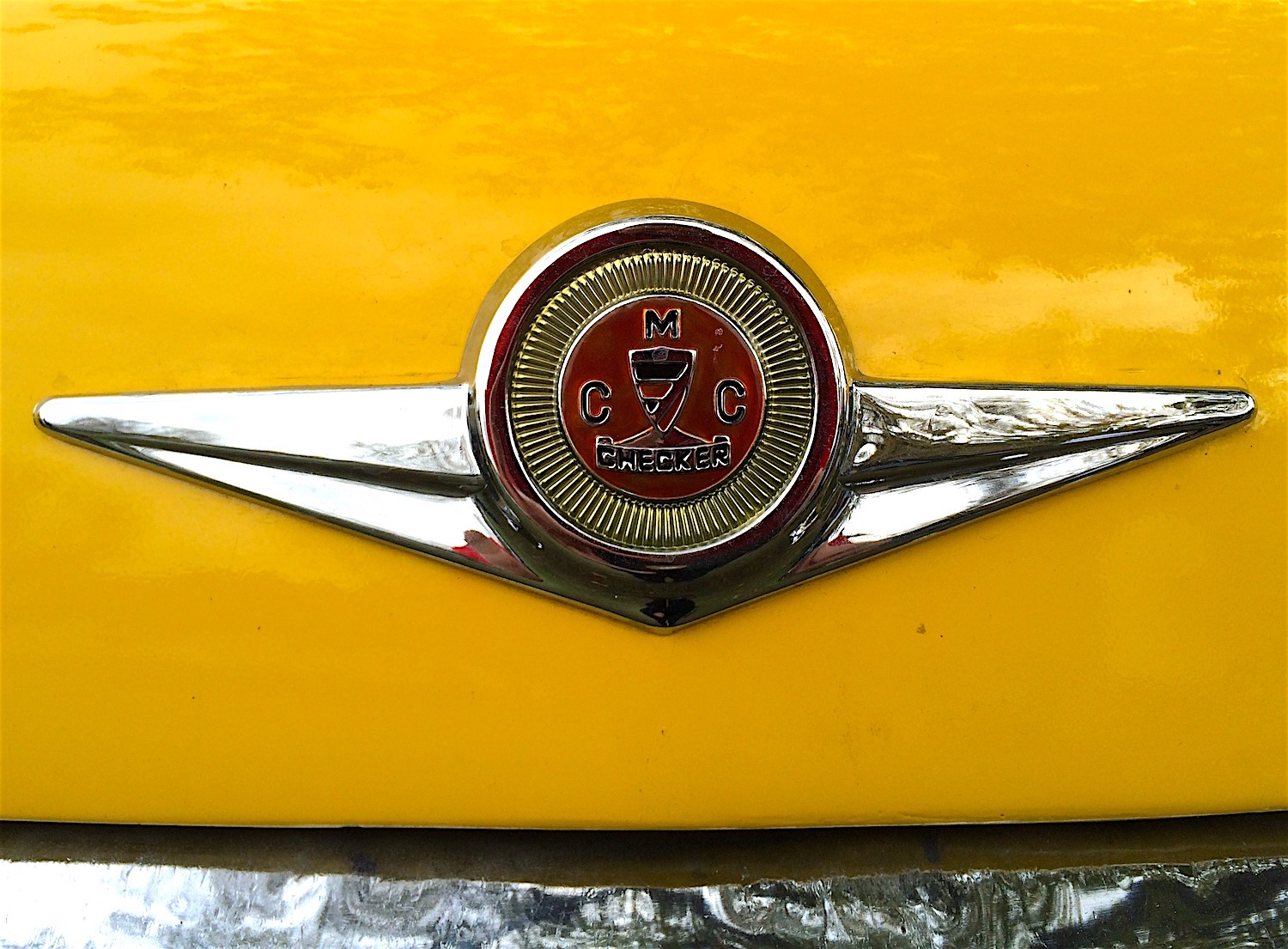
- Industry: Automotive
- Founded: 1921; 105 years ago
- Founder: Morris Markin
- Defunct: January 14, 2010
- Fate: Acquired
- Headquarters: Kalamazoo, Michigan, U.S.
- Key people: Morris Markin
- Products: Automotive stampings and components (previous: Commercial Vehicles, 1922–82 – Consumer Vehicles, 1959–82)

Checker Motors Corporation was a vehicle manufacturer, and later an automotive subcontractor, based in Kalamazoo, Michigan. The company was established by Morris Markin in 1922, created by a merger of the firms Commonwealth Motors and Markin Automobile Body, and was initially named the Checker Cab Manufacturing Company. The manufacturer was originally based in Chicago, before moving to Kalamazoo in 1923. The company was renamed Checker Motors in 1958.

Checker made the iconic American taxi cab, valued by taxicab companies for its durability in heavy use. Special features included wide rear doors, large rear seats and trunks, and jump seats for two extra passengers. In later years, the company had trouble competing with fleet discounts offered by the larger manufacturers, as well as economies of scale in procuring components. The final models were produced in 1982. After 1982, Checker invested significantly in the third party manufacturing business, serving GM and Chrysler.

On January 16, 2009, the company filed for Chapter 11 protection in U.S. Bankruptcy Court.

== Corporate history ==
=== Pre-Checker history and its formation ===
Commonwealth Motors in 1919, introduced the Mogul Taxi. Commonwealth could trace its history back to the DeSchaum Motor Syndicate, later renamed Suburban Limiteds, was founded in 1908 in Buffalo, New York. The Mogul combined the sturdy Commonwealth frame with a purpose-built taxicab body from Lomberg Auto Body Manufacturing Company, which was founded in the late 1910s by Russian immigrant Abraham Lomberg in Joliet, Illinois. Soon after, Lomberg looked for further capital to increase the capacity to build the expected orders for the Mogul, and took out a $15,000 personal loan from businessman, Morris Markin. Markin had emigrated from Russia in 1913 and worked as a clothier in Chicago, Illinois, earning his fortune by winning a contract to supply uniforms to the United States Army during World War I.

However, demand for the Mogul was lower than expected and Lomberg defaulted on the loan, surrendering his company to Markin in late 1920. When Markin took over he renamed the business Markin Automobile Body. Mogul sales continued to be slow, but Commonwealth was rescued temporarily from bankruptcy by a large order from Checker Taxi in late 1920. At the time, Checker Taxi was a privately owned taxi operator based in Chicago that had no affiliation with Markin. However, the order only kept Commonwealth afloat for a short while, and eventually it was unable to repay its creditors and entered it bankruptcy in late 1921. Markin offered Commonwealth's receivers Markin Automobile Body shares for the company's assets. Markin was helped by the assets of Markin Automobile Body being valued at $182,703, a figure that was greater than its actual worth, and that it was probably the only offer on the table. The offer was accepted by the receivers in October 1921, with Markin merging the two firms in May 1922 as the Checker Cab Manufacturing Company in May 1922.

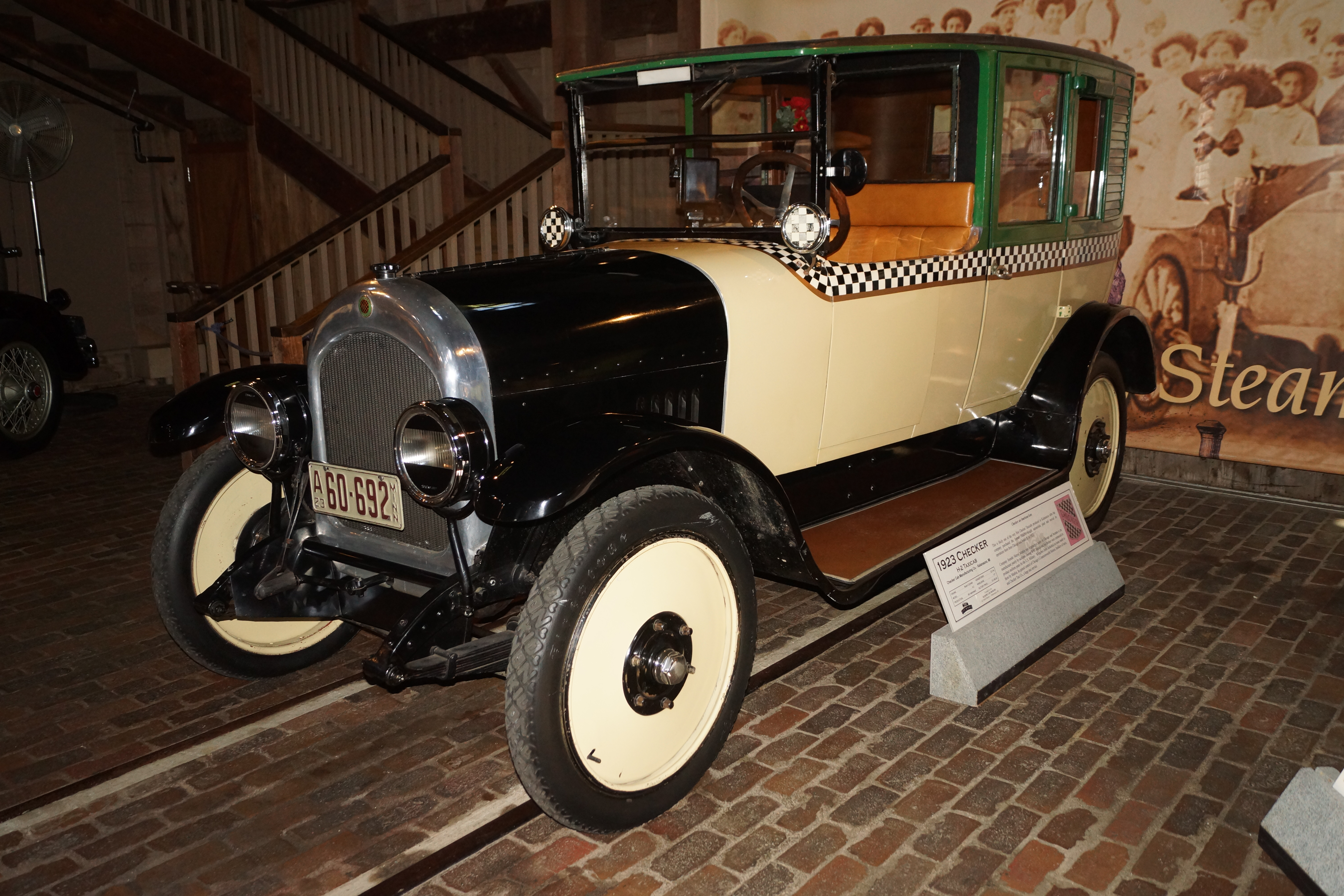
1923 Checker H-2 at the Gilmore Car Museum

Checker Cab produced the Mogul alongside Commonwealth passenger cars briefly, but soon began concentrating on commercial sales, introducing the Checker Model C on June 18, 1922, followed by a Mogul variant, the Model H, later that year. Markin is credited with devising and applying the brand's signature checkerboard trim to the vehicle's beltline. With the ongoing war between Checker Taxi and Yellow Cab, including Markin's house being bombed, Markin decided he needed to move his business away from Chicago. Checker Cab moved to Kalamazoo in 1923, taking over two factories previously operated by Dort Motor Car Company and Handley-Knight. In 1930, Checkers came in either black, maroon, yellow or canary.

=== Consolidating the taxi market ===
Markin gradually acquired the unrelated taxicab operator Checker Taxi of Chicago over the course of the 1920s. In 1929, he purchased Checker Taxi's rival Yellow Cab Company from John D. Hertz, who had grown weary of the decade-long Chicago Taxi War between Checker and Yellow Cab. The two operators were merged into the Parmelee Transportation Company. Yellow Cab previously had used taxicabs built by a subsidiary, the Yellow Cab Manufacturing Company, but after Yellow Cab (the taxi operator) was folded into Parmelee, both companies turned to Checker Cab instead, ensuring a steady demand for its taxicabs. Yellow Cab Mfg. had been established in 1920 and following its acquisition by General Motors (GM) in 1925, was reorganized as Yellow Truck & Coach. By that time, Yellow Cab Mfg. had begun to pivot towards producing motorbuses, but continued to manufacture taxicabs. Markin would go on to acquire the principal taxicab operating companies in New York City, Pittsburgh, and Minneapolis. From 1922 to 1928, Checker Cab made and sold 8,019 taxicabs to various operators.

Markin's captive market strategy proved sound during the Great Depression; with Checker Cab sales holding steady, the company continued to return a reliable profit. Although the year-to-date profit for Checker Cab in May 1931 was just US$665, it was still a positive profit when many automobile manufacturers were struggling, prompting GM to rename the Yellow Cab company to General Cab and to re-enter the taxicab market. However, operators took advantage of GM's generous terms which did not include a repayment schedule. General Motors withdrew from the market in 1938. Checker's strategy also attracted the attention of the federal government, which later brought an antitrust suit against Checker and Markin under the Sherman Act. Although the case was initially dismissed by the United States District Court for the Northern District of Illinois, that decision was reversed by the Supreme Court of the United States in 1947 and decided in favor of the defendants in 1948, who argued successfully that Checker Cab's successes with taxicab operators were due to the marque's inherent advantages and not the complex relationships between the manufacturer and operators: because Checker Cab's vehicles were purpose-built for the taxicab industry, operators naturally would choose them over modified passenger cars. After another appeal, the Supreme Court upheld the lower court's verdict in 1949.

When Parmelee was founded, Markin owned 12% of the shares of Checker Cab Mfg.; his share declined to 5% by mid-1930. The largest shareholder was a group led by John J. Raskob and millionaire Pierre S. duPont, which controlled 34%. 1931 was a profitable year for Checker, but that would soon change in 1932 as the depression finally caught up with the company. After several profitable years, sales collapsed and Checker started to bleed money, generating losses month after month. So bad was the economy that Checker shut down for several weeks at the tail end of 1932. In 1932, Checker Cab introduced the Model T and switched from Buda engines to Lycoming, which was owned by E. L. Cord. 1933 found many auto manufacturers in the midst of significant financial issues. Checker now needed to recapitalize. Unfortunately for Checker CEO Morris Markin, a hostile corporate takeover ensued via a series of capital transactions. The corporate board was reduced in size by the Raskob-duPont group in June 1933; the smaller board, which included duPont, subsequently voted to oust Markin.

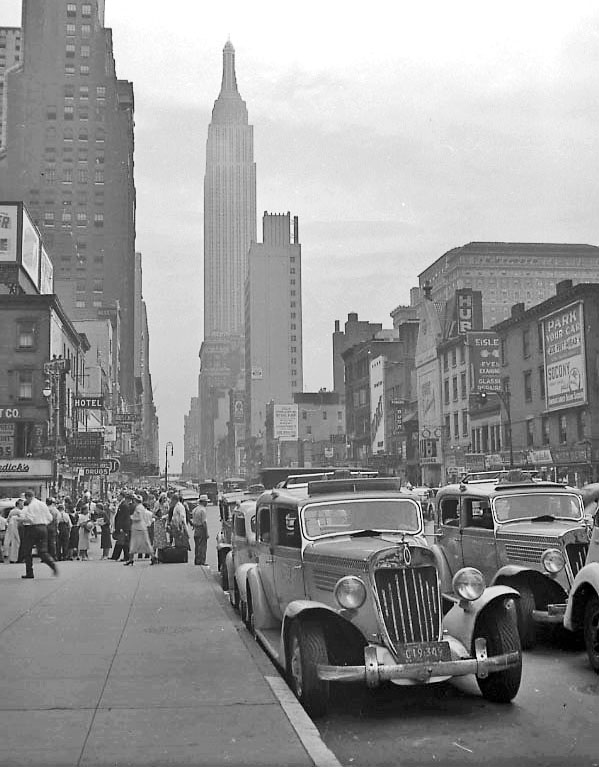
Checker Model Y taxicabs in New York City (1938)

However, Markin still retained his small share of ownership and held options to acquire a 60 percent share of the company. Ten days later Markin sold those options to E. L. Cord for less than $1 million; Checker Cab became part of the Cord Corporation and Markin was reinstalled as head of the company. With funds secured and new ownership in place, Checker Cab was integrated into the Auburn–Cord–Duesenberg (A-C-D) group, allowing Checker to operate autonomously and still draw on engineering talent from the larger group, including Auburn vice-president of engineering Herbert C. Snow.

Three short years later Cord and Markin came under investigation by the Securities and Exchange Commission for their dealings in Checker Cab stock, which had raised the price from US$7 per share in November 1935 to $69 per share in April 1936. In order to avoid prosecution, Cord sold the Cord Corporation to the Aviation Corporation in 1937. Morris Markin bought out Cord's interest in Checker Cab and was able to secure complete control of Checker. A-C-D eventually folded in the wake of the stock scandal but the now-independent Checker continued to produce taxicabs. Between 1929 and 1942, when production was suspended for World War II, Checker Cab made 29,260 cabs.

=== Return to tradition ===
After the war, Checker Cab began developing several new models which never made it to production; the Model A2 that was introduced in 1947 was mechanically similar to the pre-war (1939) Model A. The Model A also had switched to a new engine supplier; Checker cabs now used the Continental inline-six. The A2 was introduced alongside the A3, which had a different internal configuration to seat up to eight passengers. The A2/A3 went through minor modifications as the A4/A5 and A6/A7.

In addition to taxicabs, Checker briefly built the chassis for the Series E transit buses; the primary customer was Detroit Street Railways.

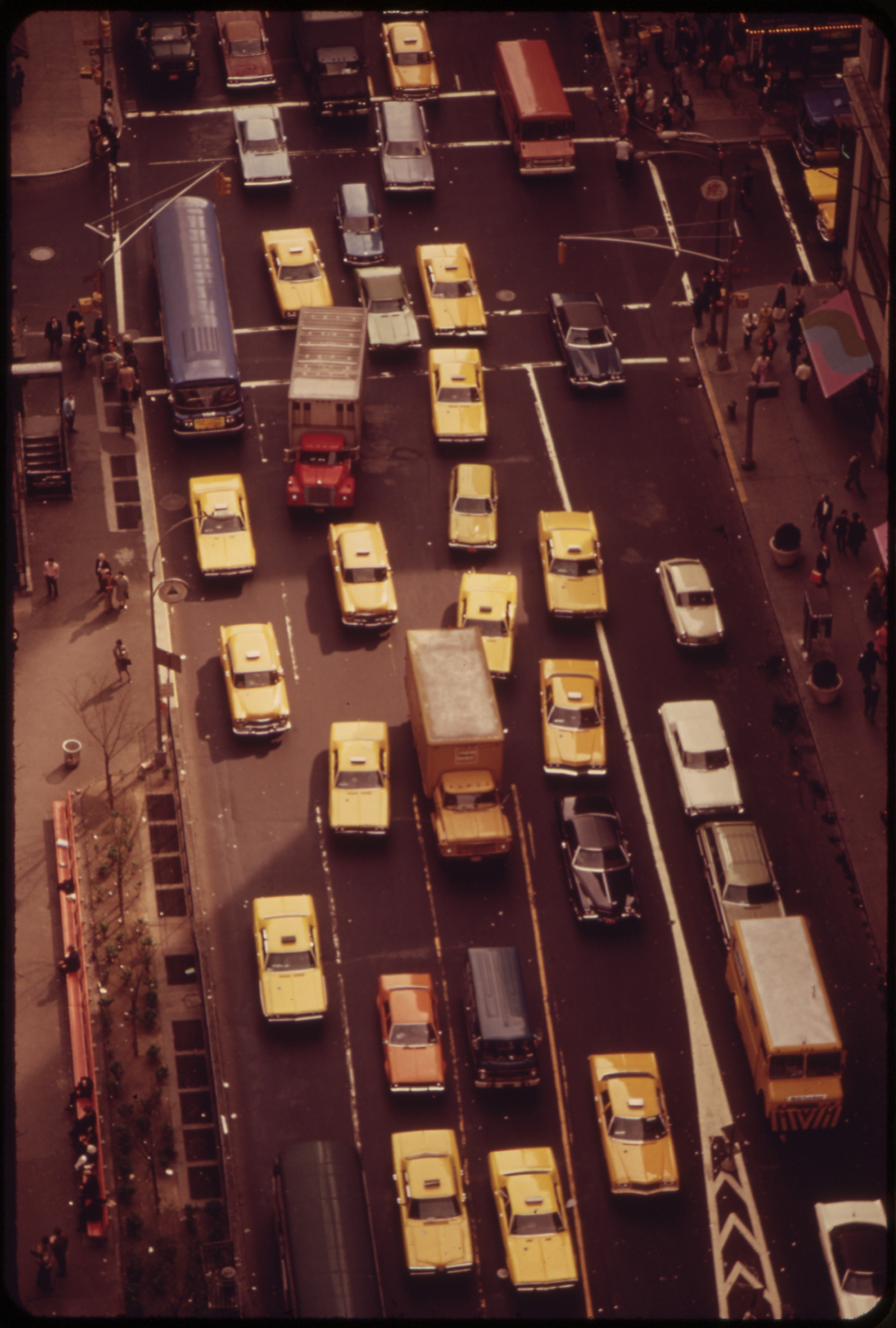
By 1973, the Checker Cab was still common but no longer ubiquitous in New York City

In 1956, Checker introduced the A8, which continued with minor styling changes as the A9/A10 and A11/A12 through the end of Checker vehicle production in 1982. Also that year, the company changed its name to Checker Motors Corporation. The A9 was the designation for the taxicab model, while the A10 was the corresponding vehicle sold to the public as a passenger car; a similar relationship exists between the A11 and A12, which were introduced in 1961.

By the 1970s, conventional automobiles from the Big Three were replacing the purpose-built Checker Cabs; the Checker was considered "too big, too cumbersome, [and] too thirsty" as it had been built to meet obsolescent requirements.

In 1982, with the body stamping dies wearing out, production of the Checker Cab was discontinued.

=== Subcontracting ===
After winding down vehicle production in 1982, Checker Motors served as a subcontractor, supplying automotive parts and stampings to Detroit-area manufacturers.

In 1989, Checker Motors and Checker Holding Company were involved in a reverse acquisition with International Controls Corporation (Great Dane Trailers), and the company later changed its name to CRA Holdings. The company was reorganized in 1995 into three wholly owned subsidiaries: Yellow Cab (owns and leases taxicabs in Chicago), Chicago Autoworks (taxicab repair and other services) and CMC Kalamazoo. Other subsidiaries include American Country Insurance Company (a provider of property and casualty insurance), Great Dane (the largest manufacturer of truck trailers, containers and chassis) and South Charleston Stamping & Manufacturing Company. The company was renamed Great Dane Limited Partnership, and was acquired by Chicago-based CC Industries.

Purchased in August 1989, South Charleston Stamping was sold by Checker to Mayflower Corp. in November 1996. South Charleston Stamping had been owned previously by Volkswagen and supported Volkswagen automobile production in Pennsylvania in the late 1970s.

Checker Motors operated as a subsidiary of CC Industries as an automotive subcontractor, primarily for General Motors, into the 21st century. Checker made body stamping for various GMC/Chevrolet truck lines and chassis components for Cadillac. David Markin, son of founder Morris Markin, continued to act as CMC Chief Executive Officer.

In 2008, due to the late-2000s recession and high gasoline prices, sales at GM and other automakers plummeted. As a major supplier to GM, Checker saw its sales drop significantly. The company had net sales of $61 million in 2008 and projected 2009 sales of only $34.5 million, a decline of 43%. During the summer of 2008, Checker employed about 340 workers.

While the United States economy was in full recession, Checker Motors CEO David Markin fell victim to the Ponzi scheme started and run by Bernie Madoff. David Markin's name appears five times on the official list of Madoff victims. One address on the list was 2016 North Pitcher Street, Kalamazoo, the same address as Checker Motors Corp.

On January 16, 2009, the 87-year-old Kalamazoo company filed in U.S. Bankruptcy Court in Grand Rapids, Michigan. Escalating raw material prices and dwindling sales for its customers' products were cited as the main reasons for the filing, but another reason was labor costs. It was reported that a deal with unionized labor could not be reached after a year of negotiations.

At the time of the bankruptcy, Checker's customer base included General Motors, Chrysler LLC, Ford Motor Company, Navistar International and GM Shanghai. Checker was the eighth-largest American auto supplier to go bankrupt in recent years. GM and Chrysler followed Checker's bankruptcy just several months later.

In February, Checker asked the U.S. Bankruptcy Court for Western Michigan to reject its contract with 125 union workers and eliminate health care and pension benefits for 176 union retirees. On February 27, 2009, the judge in Checker Motors Corp.'s bankruptcy case threw out the company's request to eliminate its labor agreement. Bankruptcy Judge James D. Gregg agreed with United Steelworkers Union Local 2-682 attorneys that the company had not treated all parties involved in the proceeding fairly when it awarded four top executives a total of $275,000 in retention bonuses prior to filing for bankruptcy.

In March 2009, a committee of unsecured creditors in the bankruptcy case asked Judge Gregg to consider whether negotiations among the union, United Steel Workers Local 2-682 and Checker Motors could resume and reach concessions or if a mediator should be brought in, according to court documents.

On April 4, 2009, Checker notified its more than 270 employees that CMC would close its business by the end of June.

In a bankruptcy court hearing Monday, April 6, 2009, CMC and labor union representatives said they intended to continue trying to negotiate a new union contract that would allow Checker Motors to survive.

In May Checker was given permission to enter into agreements with General Motors Corp. that were intended to help the bankrupt supplier stay afloat until it could negotiate the sale of itself to a new owner.

In late May, Checker announced that it found a potential buyer, the Narmco Group. On June 9, 2009, Judge Gregg approved the sale of Checker Motors Corp. to the subsidiaries of two Canadian automotive suppliers, Narmco Group LLC and Van-Rob Inc.

The Narmco Group, based in Windsor, Ontario, paid $650,000 for Checker's business of making stamped metal and welded assemblies for GM trucks and other vehicles. Van-Rob Inc., based in Aurora, Ontario, paid $950,000 for some of Checker's manufacturing equipment.

Christopher Grosman, an attorney representing Checker Motors, told Judge Gregg that the offers from Narmco and Van-Rob represented the "highest and best value" to Checker's creditors. Grosman said much of the company's machinery could not be sold because, in the wake of downsizing throughout the automotive industry, the market had been flooded with similar equipment.

The $1.6-million sale meant the end of the road for Checker. About 125 Checker workers in Kalamazoo made parts until June 30, then the business was transferred to Canada. In July 2009, General Motors Corp paid $1.5 million to Walker Tool and Dies for tools and dies that remained on site at Checker. Walker Tool had liens on the tools, so payment was required to move the tools to Canada. The tooling was transferred to Canada to make the Buick Lacrosse.

On January 14, 2010, the Checker Motor Company officially went out of business with the sale of its Kalamazoo headquarters. It was purchased for just under $3 million by a holding company, the Jones Group, which was to sell off the assets and clear the 72 acres. Checker president David Markin was quoted in the New York Times, "It's finished. Our family is very distressed about the closing of the company, but it became inevitable."

Private investment company Oak Point Partners acquired the remaining assets, consisting of any known and unknown assets that weren't previously administered, from the Checker Motors Corporation Bankruptcy Estate on January 31, 2018.

== Commercial vehicles ==
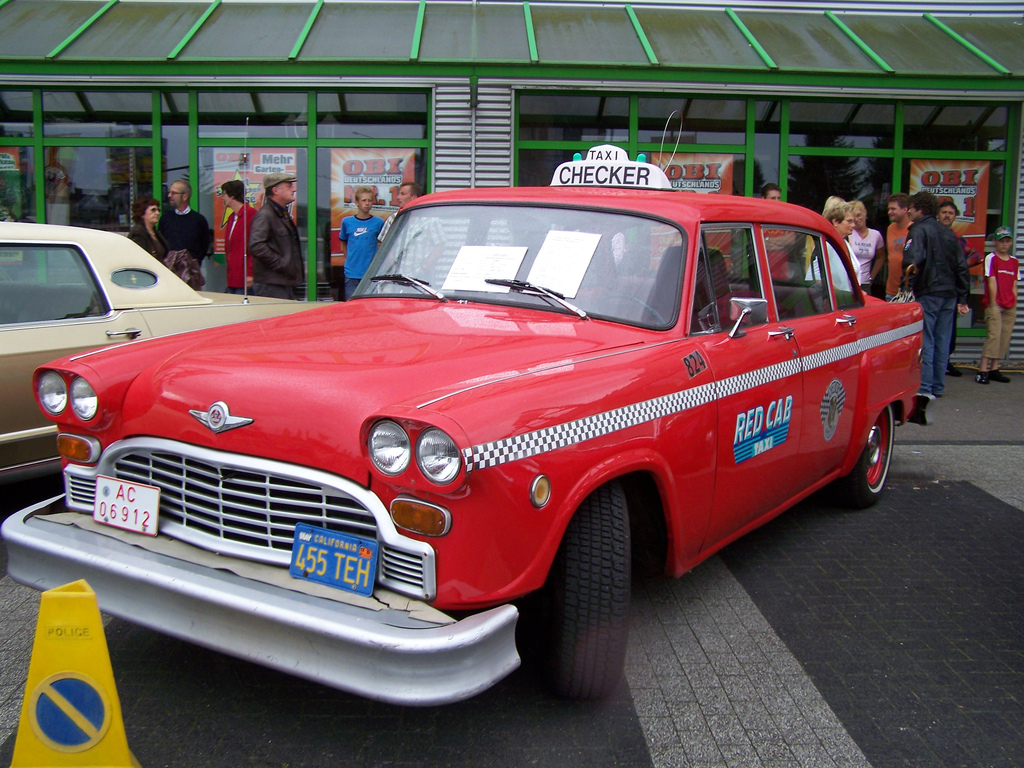
Checker Taxi

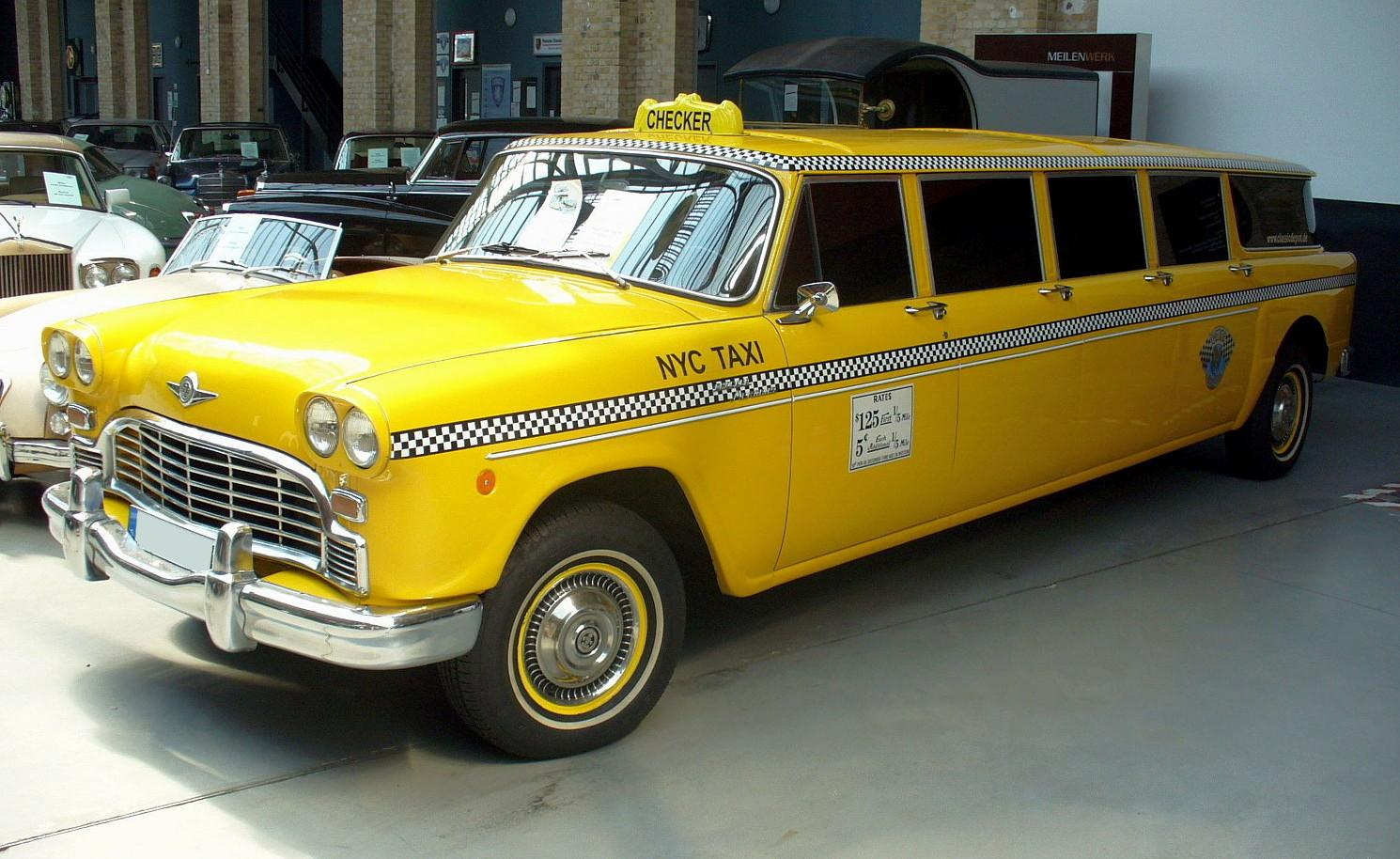
Checker Aerobus

Checker is best known for its taxicab, on which it built its business and reputation. In its early years Markin not only produced the vehicles but also ran Checker Taxi, a taxicab operator in Chicago that was in direct competition with the Yellow Cab Company, owned by John D. Hertz.

During the 1930s Checker built trailers for Sears-Roebuck and truck cabs for Ford Motor Company. Checker also built four prototype Jeeps that were tested by the U.S. Army. They were developed in partnership with the American Bantam Company (a builder of Austin-based tiny autos) and featured four-wheel drive and four-wheel steering. During World War II Checker built tank retrieval trailers, tank recovery vehicles and semi-, petroleum and other types of trailers.

Checker designs changed infrequently; Markin held on to certain design features long after they were discontinued by major automobile manufacturers. For example, open front fenders were retained by Markin into the 1940s because it saved operators the expense of repairing minor dents. Taxicab models were designated by a letter series; significant modifications in models (new major systems, etc.) were designated by a number following the model letter.

Checker's commercial vehicles were usually given letter designations instead of model names (most notably variations of the Checker Model A). An exception to this rule was the Checker Aerobus, an extended version of its cars, built on a stretched wheelbase allowing for each row of seats to have its own doors. The Aerobus was often associated with airports and train stations, although vacation resorts also used Aerobuses for transporting guests.

=== Early taxis (C, H, H2, E, F, G) ===
Early Checker Cab Mogul-based commercial taxicabs
Model (year)	Engine	HP	wheelbase	Passengers
Model C-44 (1922)	4-cylinder	40	N/A	5–7
Model H-2 (1923)	4-cylinder	22.5	127 in (3,226 mm)	5
Model E (1924)	4-cylinder	22.5	127 in (3,226 mm)	5
Model E (1925-1926)	4-cylinder	22.5	117 in (2,972 mm)	5
Model F (1926-1927)	4-cylinder	22.5	117 in (2,972 mm)	5
Model G-4 (1927-1928)	4-cylinder	22.5	117 in (2,972 mm)	5
Model G-6 (1927-1928)	6-cylinder	27.30	124 3/4 in (3,169 mm)	5

The early Models C and H were built at Joliet; with the move to Kalamazoo, Checker introduced the Model H2. The Kalamazoo factory opened on June 23, 1923. Models E, F, and G followed; all of these early taxicabs were based on the original Commonwealth Mogul design. Model E was offered as a five-passenger vehicle from 1924 to 1926 with a choice of three body styles: Landau, Limousine, or Roadster. The Model F was introduced in 1925 and could be distinguished from the Model E by its raked windshield, and the Model G, introduced in 1927, offered an optional six-cylinder engine for the first time. At Kalamazoo, bodies were built at the former Dort factory on South Pitcher Street, then shipped to the former Handley-Knight factory on North Pitcher Street where the chassis were built, being integrated at North Pitcher as each finished chassis rolled off the line.

=== Model K (1928) ===
Second-generation Checker Cab commercial taxicabs
Model (year)	Engine	HP	wheelbase	Passengers
Model K-6 (1929–32)	6-cylinder	27.30	127 in (3,226 mm)	6
Model M (1931–32)	6-cylinder	61.5	122 in (3,099 mm)	6
Model T/T-8 (1933–34)	8-cylinder	98	130 in (3,302 mm)	6–8
Model Y-6 (1935–36)	6-cylinder	80	?	5–9
Model Y-8 (1935–39)	8-cylinder	148	?	5–9

There were major changes at Checker with a truly new model, the Model K, introduced on October 4, 1928. An advanced, modern design for its day, it was now a purpose built taxi with luxurious town car styling cues. The body was integrated in its design bumper to bumper; no longer did it possess the Commonwealth Mogul front clip mated to a taxicab body first introduced in 1918.

The Model K was Checker's first ground-up design, introduced 6 years after the founding of Checker. Consistent with previous Checkers, the Model K utilized a 127-inch wheelbase and the Buda six-cylinder was now the only engine available. Within the first month of introduction, there were over 4,800 orders. By January 1929, 950 units had been produced and sold. At the end of January 1929, over 8,000 Checkers were chasing fares in New York City, a city with a total population of 21,000 cabs. This made Checker one of the two dominant taxicab builders in the US, the other being Yellow Cab Manufacturing. Together, the two taxicab manufacturers pushed the other taxicab producers, Premier, Pennant and HCS, out of the market. These two taxicab giants would slug it out through the next decade.

=== Model M (1930) ===
The Model M was introduced in late 1930; compared to the Model K, the M had front fenders that pointed straight forward, carried headlights set in rectangular bezels, and rode on a wheelbase 5 in (130 mm) shorter. The M carried a more powerful Buda J-214 six-cylinder engine with 61.5 hp (45.9 kW), more than double the 27.3 hp (20.4 kW) output of the Buda CS6 in the K.

In addition to the taxicab sedans, the Model M was available with a "utility" station wagon body as the MU6 in 1931 and 1932. Wealthy businessman Samuel Insull ordered a custom bulletproof M limousine, but was tried for fraud one year after he took delivery; it is not known what happened to his car.

=== Model T (1933) ===
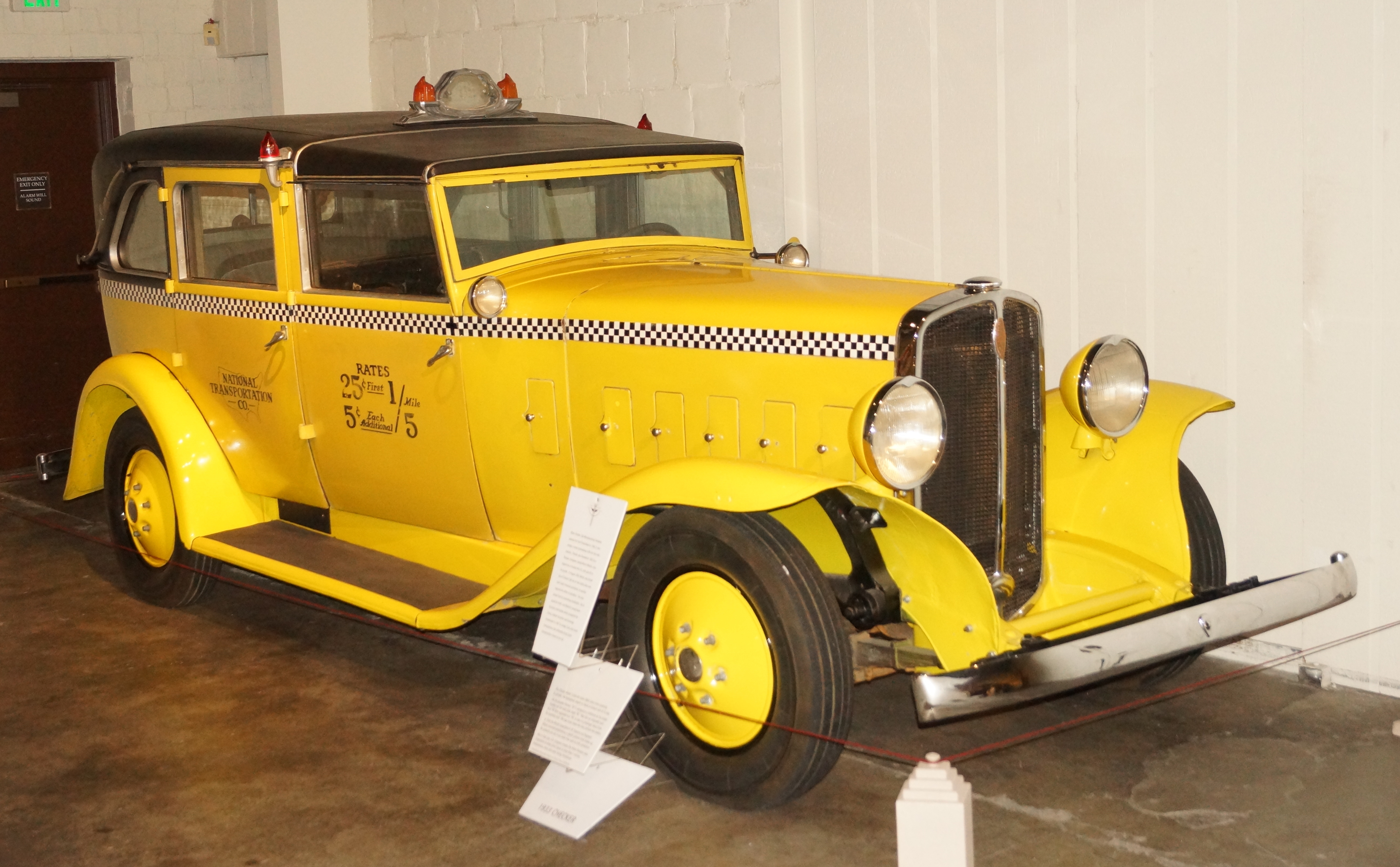
Checker Model T at the ACD Museum

Despite the losses of 1932 and using minimal funds, Checker was able to introduce a new taxicab for 1933, the Model T, derived from the Model M. The new taxicab utilized the new Lycoming GU or GUC straight-eight cylinder engine; Lycoming was part of the Auburn-Cord-Duesenberg (A-C-D) group owned by E.L. Cord, who also had recently assumed ownership of Checker.

In 1933 Checker would also produce a brand-engineered version of the Model T, the Auburn Safe-T-Cab for A-C-D, which was sold in limited numbers to the Safe-T-Cab Company in Cleveland. Like the Model M, the Model T also was offered in a "Suburban Utility" variant for 1933 and 1934. In addition, approximately 500 Model T trucks were built in 1933.

=== Model Y (1934) ===
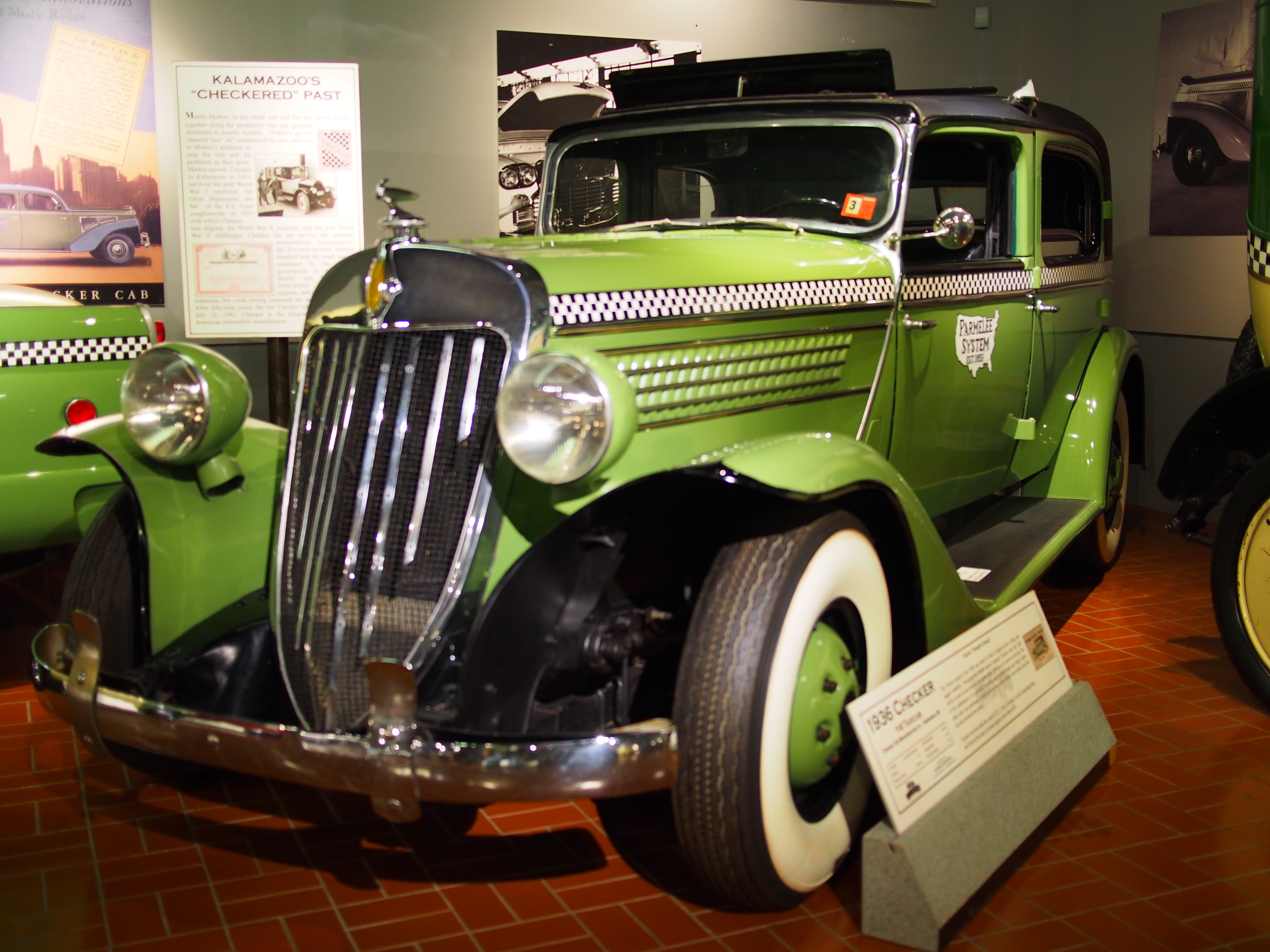
Checker Model Y

In 1934, Checker began development of a new taxicab, the Model Y. It was the third offering in the evolution of the 1928 Model K and quite striking in appearance, with many style cues reminiscent of its new corporate cousin, the Auburn, albeit an industrial version. Cord continued his method of marketing through up-to-date style and a sense of luxury, adding chrome trim, flared fenders, padded tops and vacuum-powered sunroofs.

The Model Y also served as a platform for many new Checker concepts to be utilized for the next 50 years. The long wheelbase version could be purchased in 6- and 8-door variations and also offered an integrated body trunk, a first in the automotive industry. This configuration yielded the first mass-produced car with a three-box design, years ahead of the 1947 Studebaker and 1949 Ford post-war offerings.

Other features included a multi-position adjustable driver seat and glass windows in the roof that passengers would love when sightseeing in major cities. Looks alone were not the only similarities to Auburn; the Model Y utilized the Lycoming 148 hp inline GFD 8, the same engine used in the Auburn 850, although later in 1936 there was the option of a six-cylinder Continental engine. This taxicab would be produced until 1939.

In addition to automobile production, Checker played a significant role as a third-party automotive supplier of OEM body stampings. In the late 1930s Checker produced truck bodies for Hudson in addition to manufacturing complete Ford truck cabs. Checker also produced truck bodies for the REO Motor Car Company.

=== Model A (1939) ===
Third-generation Checker Cab commercial taxicabs
Model (year)	Engine	HP	wheelbase	Passengers
Model A
Model A2	6-cylinder	26.3	124 in (3,150 mm)	5
Model A3	6-cylinder	26.3	124 in (3,150 mm)	9
Model A4	6-cylinder	26.3	124 in (3,150 mm)	5
Model A5	6-cylinder	26.3	124 in (3,150 mm)	9
Model A6	6-cylinder	80	124 in (3,150 mm)	5
Model A7	6-cylinder	80	124 in (3,150 mm)	9
Model A8 (1956–58)	6-cylinder			
Model A9 (1959)
Model A11 (1961–82)

The Model A was put on sale in 1940. When the Checker Model A was introduced it had more interior room than any previous model produced. It was also the first Checker to migrate away from the limousine concept with its driver dividers, focusing on the taxi commodity business: the Model A brochure, placed significant emphasis that taxi operators should consider themselves the seller of a commodity and should think of new ways to attract customers.

With the Model A, Checker incorporated new features to enhance the taxi passenger riding experience, including the new landaulet top, where at a touch of a finger, the driver could lower the back section of the roof so that passengers could ride in an open-air mode. If shade was required, a cloth awning could be inserted to reduce the effects of the sun, yet still maintain the open-air feel. Passengers in the jump seats were not left out of the experience, because above their heads was a ventilated glass roof (marketed as "Air-n-Lite") that passengers could open to increase the flow of fresh air, yet still sight-see through the glass roof. Both the glass roof and the landaulet roof were Checker exclusive features, patented in 1936 and 1939 respectively.

The taxi driver also rode with the comfort of Checker exclusive features. Checker claimed that the seat could be adjusted in no less than 15 positions, because the company had always maintained that a comfortable seat would allow the driver to drive longer shifts and yield greater profits for taxicab operators. This Checker exclusive had been patented in 1931. Above the driver's head was a vent in the roof to allow fresh air to flow into the driver compartment. The driver compartment was now protected during all four seasons and for the first time was heated. Gone were the days of drivers being exposed to the weather. The manual transmission shift was moved to the steering column, again in an effort to improve the overall driving experience.

From the rear back, the Model A has the streamline styling that was very popular at the time; that said, the Model A front end has always garnered strong opinions from automobile fans. Early artists’ renditions of the Model A depict an integrated streamline design from fore to aft, but the production car sports a unique, even gothic front clip. It's unclear why the major change in the front end styling was made to the production vehicle, but it has been said that the “sugar scoop” fenders, inherited in part from the preceding Model Y, were purpose built to provide safety from tire damage in minor city traffic accidents. At the time, other taxis with streamlined fenders ran the risk of having a tyre pierced in a minor accident, whereas the Model A had a higher probability of driving away.

The Checker Model A was only made for two full years, 1939 and 1940. 1941 was a shortened model run due to WWII.

=== Post-WW2: Models B, C, and D ===
Over the years the rumour grew up that Morris Markin melted down all the body tools and dies for the war effort. Automobile production ceased as Checker supported the army by supplying them with trailers to be used with a new invention of the war, the Jeep. During this time Checker was one of many producers of the G518 Ben Hur trailer.

As the war ended, Checker was facing the challenge of designing and producing a new postwar car. During this period Checker utilized two innovative consultants, Herbert C. Snow and Ray Dietrich. Snow was formerly the chief of engineering at Auburn-Cord-Duesenberg. While at A-C-D, Snow was the engineering leader who designed the front-wheel drive system used on the classic Cord L-29 and 810/812. Morris Markin hired Ray Dietrich as a consultant in May 1938, for the hefty sum of one hundred dollars a day. Like Snow, Dietrich was an experienced designer, having worked for Briggs, Le Baron and eventually Chrysler. Dietrich's rise at Chrysler was credited to his redesign of the Chrysler Airflow; the resulting Chrysler Airstream saved Chrysler from the sales failure of the Airflow.

Now, with two of the automotive industry's top engineers, Checker set out to introduce a replacement for the Model A. Called the Model B, the new, very unconventional Checker was to be very different from Checkers of the past, or for that matter any US produced car. Snow proposed a rear engine/rear drive vehicle, much like the Volkswagen Microbus. In a memo in May 1945 Snow laid out his vision. He wrote, "The primary purpose of a vehicle of this kind is to carry passengers comfortably and economically. To do this, passengers must be placed in the most advantageous seating and riding position. The vehicle must be light if it is to operate economically. Keeping weight to a minimum means that the entire vehicle must be as compact as possible without any sacrifice in passenger space." The project progressed to the development of a mule. Designated the Model C, it utilized a L-head Continental 6 placed transversely in the rear of the cab, mated to a Warner three speed manual transmission. The overall length of the cab was 198.5 inches and the wheelbase was 100 inches. As was always the case with Checker being an "assembled car", many components for the Model C were sourced from the "parts bin" of other makers and independent component producers. In the case of the test mule, the front and rear suspension, brakes and wheels were from Studebaker.

The test mule went through extensive testing, and the results were poor. Prior to his death, Snow recounted to automotive writer Karl Ludvigsen the facts of the project:

"The objections to this design were that a vehicle of this type with the engine mounted in the rear behind the rear axle cannot have good weight distribution on a short wheelbase. There was too much weight on the rear wheels for good roadability and performance. Furthermore we had passenger seats facing each other as in trains and this we considered would be very objectionable to the passengers who rode backwards in the front seat." Given its poor handling and questionable passenger comfort, the project was killed.

In the summer of 1945, Snow moved on to a new project, the Checker Model D. Like the Model C, it was unconventional. It would be a front-wheel drive vehicle with a transverse engine mounted forward of the cab. Plans called for a significant number of variations to be produced, including sedans, limos, station wagons, coupes, convertibles, and light trucks.

Two running prototypes, a five-passenger sedan and a seven-passenger taxicab, were developed. The prototypes were equipped with a transverse mounted Continental 6 cylinder engines mated to a 3-speed manual transmission. The prototypes rode on a 112-inch wheelbase within a total length of 189.5 inches, six inches shorter than the 1946 Ford sedan and a foot shorter than the Model C prototype. The Dietrich styling was quite attractive and current. Unlike the Model A, its front end styling was well integrated into the overall design of the car, bearing a very close resemblance to the 1941 Chrysler.

The two prototypes were tested for well over 100,000 miles. The taxicab was tested in real taxi service, accumulating over 35,000 miles and the sedan ran in tests totaling over 65,000 miles. According to Snow, quoted in Special Interest Auto Magazine in 1973, "The passengers commented on the excellent ride qualities and the drivers claimed it was easy to keep on the road, handled well in traffic and on the highway." Tested in the early winter, according to Snow: "In heavy blizzards under adverse road conditions, it performed exceptionally well, pulling out from curbs blocked with snow without difficulty." Although both vehicles tested well, in the end it appeared that the Model D would have a higher cost per unit to produce. Tests also indicated that maintenance cost for the more complex FWD Checker would be higher than Taxi operators would find acceptable. The Model D project was killed in 1946, which left Checker with a major problem. The company had not produced a car in close to five years and whatever Markin had done with the body tooling, there was none left from the Model A to continue production in the post war years. A new effort was initiated to quickly develop a modified version of the Model A; the resulting product would be the Model A2.

=== Model A2 (1946) ===
Checker rapidly developed a replacement for the Model A, combining the chassis and engine configuration of the original Model A with the Dietrich-designed body of the Model D. The resulting vehicle was called the Model A2. The body passenger compartment of the A2 is virtually identical to the Model D, the only difference being the length of the front clip, which was redesign to be configured for a front inline Continental 6-cylinder flathead engine and rear wheel drive configuration of the Model A. The Checker A2 dimensions were consistent with most large US produced automobiles at a total length of 205.5 in (5,220 mm) riding on a wheelbase of 124 in (3,100 mm).

The Model A2 was developed in less than one year and was introduced to the public on December 15, 1946, in Automotive Industries Magazine. Checker's partnership with A-C-D in the 1930s had included sharing engineering talent. Herb Snow, the vice-president of engineering for Auburn, previously had introduced a rear-drive ladder frame chassis with an X-shaped brace in 1931 with the Auburn 8-98. Snow would later use a similar X-braced ladder frame under the Checker A2. Despite the limited time and fast-paced development time the patented X-Frame continued to set the bar for purpose built taxis. The A2 featured pontoon fenders that flowed into the doors, a classic long hood and curvaceous passenger cabin. The body line behind the windshield was comparable with the styling on other classic cars of the period. Missing from the Model A were the driver roof vent, the glass roof and the landaulet opening roof.

=== Model A3 (1947) ===
The following year, in August 1947, Checker introduced another model, the A3. Called a pleasure car, this automobile was Checker's first official entry into the non-taxi market; a car that could be sold into the “Black Car” limo markets that were growing in most US cities. A deluxe version of the A2, the A3 sported a full-width bench front seat, more chrome, and was equipped with a rear trunk. This was the first time Checker had offered a trunk as standard equipment. Since the A2 was designed as a taxi cab, it did not have a trunk. This was because many US cities still had laws on the books that prohibited taxis equipped with trunks. Many of these laws dated back to the prohibition era as rumrunners would transport illegal booze out of sight of the police in the trunks of taxicabs.

In 1947, Checker began limited sales of the A3 to the public; previously, Checker sold almost exclusively to commercial operators.

=== Models A4 & A5 (1950) | A6 & A7 (1953) ===
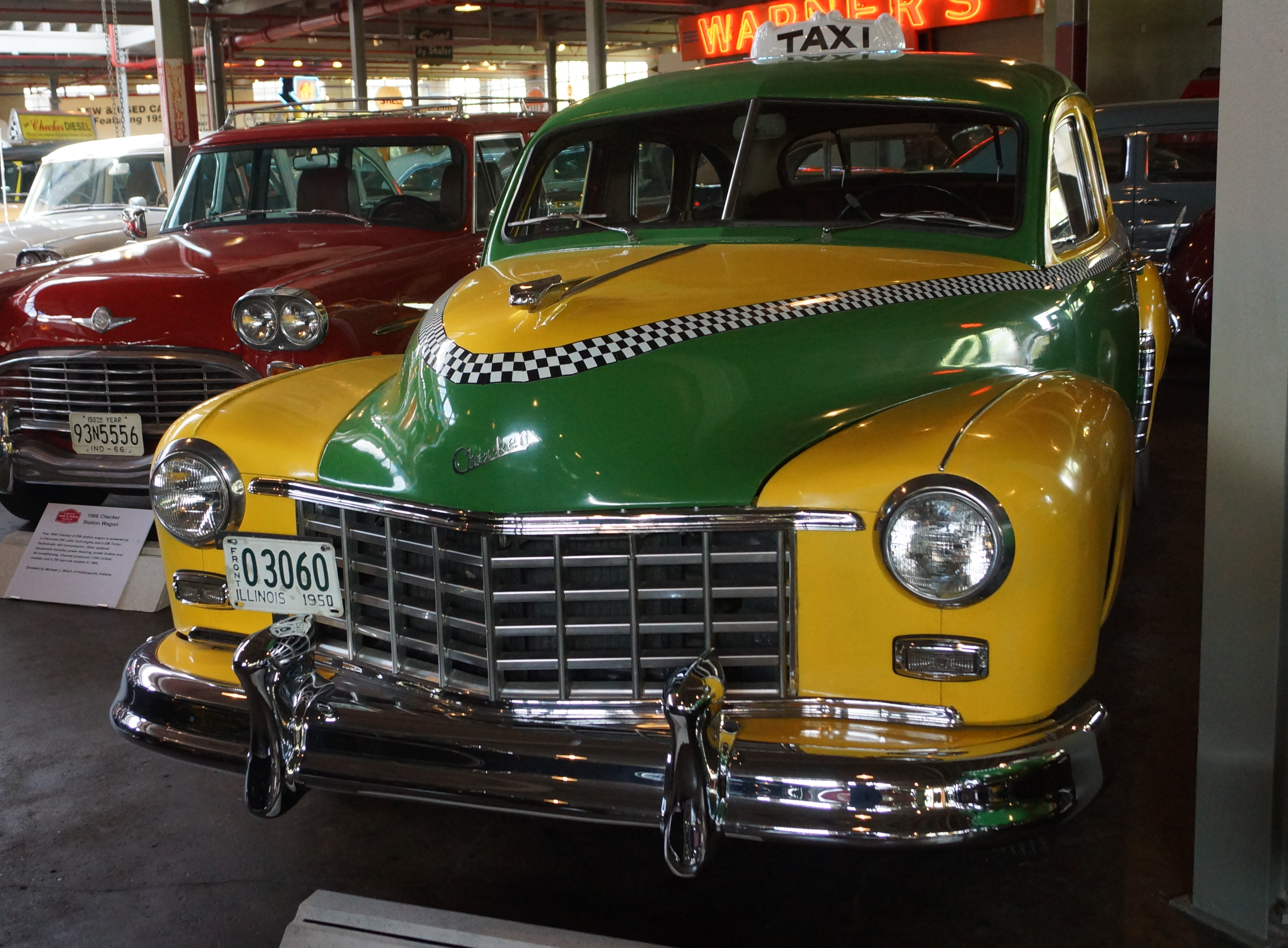
1950 Checker A4

Checker introduced the A4 and A5 in 1950, minor updates to the A2 and A3 respectively for the taxicab and limousine markets. Overall length grew modestly to 208 3/8 in (5,290 mm), but both vehicles retained the same 124 in (3,100 mm) wheelbase as their predecessors. The windows, jump seats, and grille were enlarged; the new models had an aggregate increase of 212 sq in (1,370 cm^{2}) of glass area.

The A6 and A7 followed in 1953, with the A6 intended for the taxicab market and the A7 as a limousine. For passengers, the primary difference from the preceding A4/A5 was a raised roof to improve rear headroom.

=== Model A8 (1956) ===
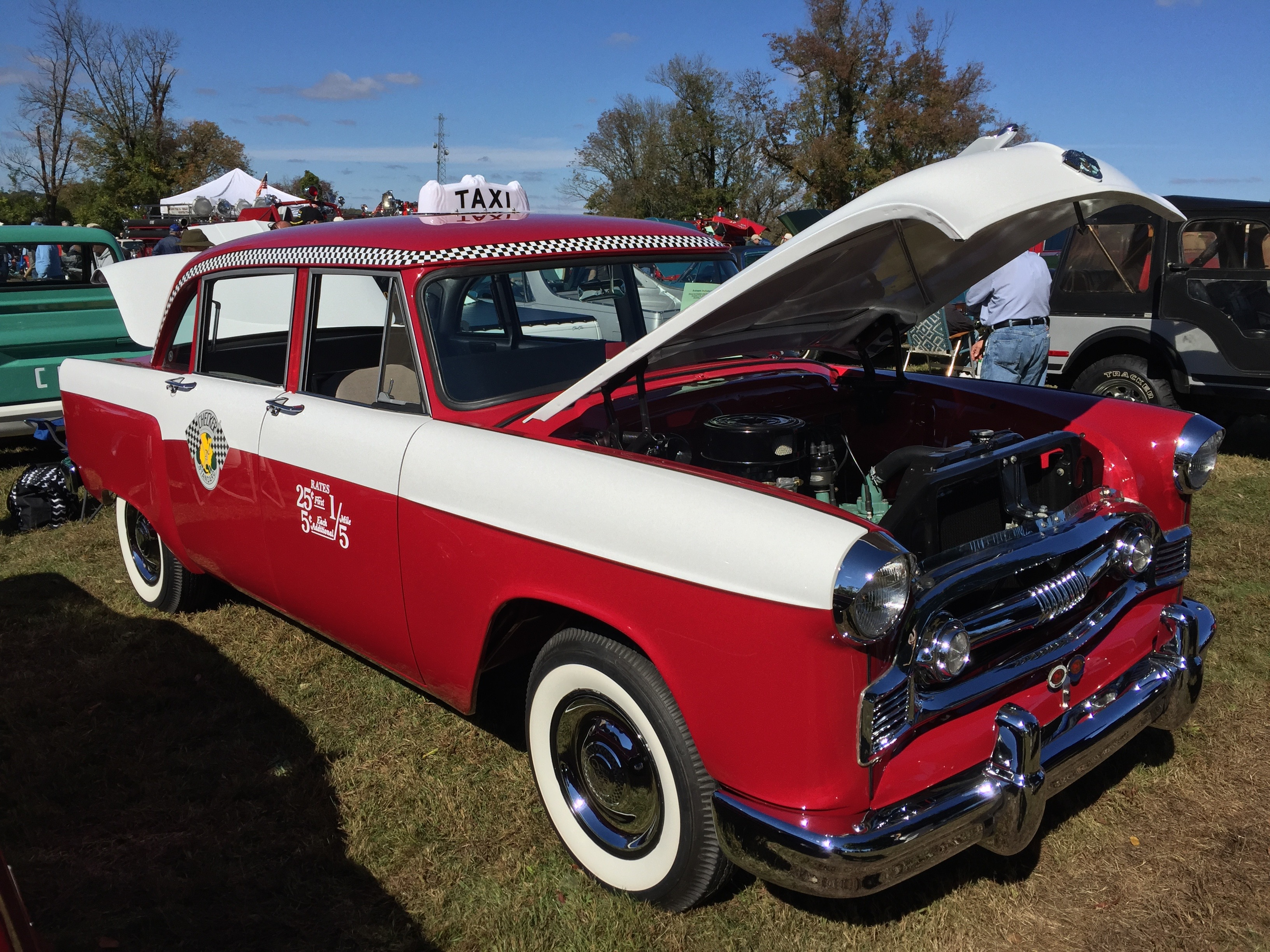
Checker A8. Note the single headlamp per side.

When New York City limited the wheelbase of taxis to 120 inches, Checker was ready with a brand-new body that would form the basic styling until the end of production in 1982. This was the A8, which featured slab-sided, boxy styling for the first time. The A8, produced from 1956 to 1958, had single headlights and a heavy bar-type grille in front, with high-mounted taillights resembling the 1953 Chevrolet. The basic chassis and drivetrain, however, remained similar to previous models going back to the 1939 Model A, including its Continental F-226 "Red Seal" inline 6 cylinder engine.

The body was designed to simplify maintenance, as exterior panels were fastened by bolts and could be replaced without special tools or welding; the front and rear bumpers were interchangeable. The X-frame chassis used a Dana 44 rear axle on leaf springs with an independent front suspension that used some components from the 1954 Ford models. The A8 was equipped with drum brakes and a three-speed manual transmission.

=== Model A9 (1958) ===
For 1958, a restyle of the A8 was introduced, the A9. It featured dual headlights, and a revised egg-crate grille with parking lights built in, surrounded by a "starburst" design. Shortly after the A9 was introduced, Checker began marketing their cars to the general public, the first of these being the A10 Superba, which was a "civilian" A9 with the taxi equipment removed. The Superba was available both as a four-door sedan and as a station wagon. The wagon was designated A10W.

=== Model A11 (1961) ===
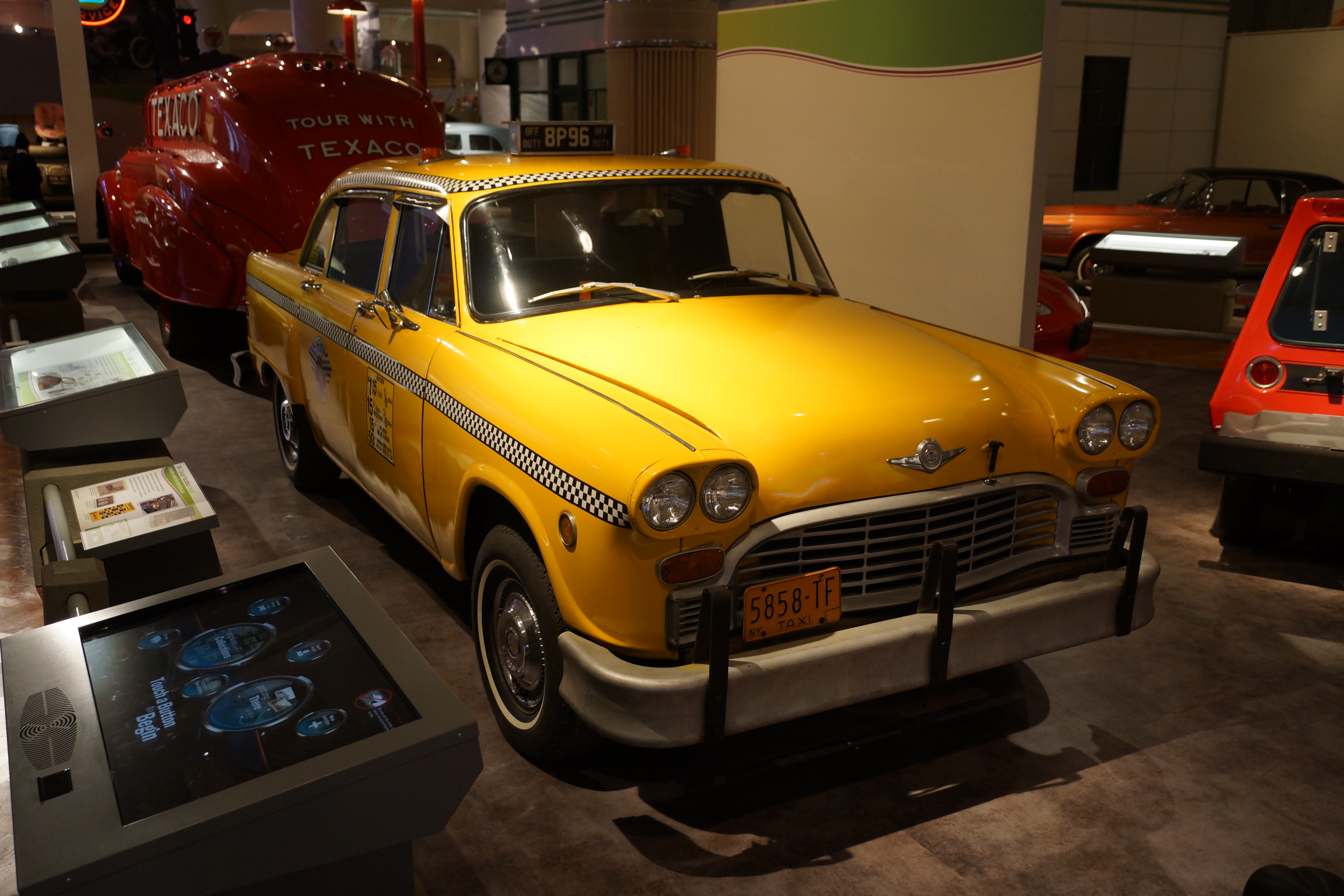
1981 A11 "8P96" at The Henry Ford

The A11 (sold to the public as the A12) was introduced in 1961 and incorporated quad headlamps. During the 1960s, Checker usually managed to meet its target volume of 6,000-7,000 cars a year. In 1962, production topped 8,000, most of which were taxis.

In 1964, the state of New York pursued Markin and Checker on antitrust charges, alleging that it controlled both the taxi service and manufacture of taxis, and thus favored itself in fulfilling orders. Rather than allow Checker drivers to begin buying different brands of cars, Markin began selling licenses in New York City.

The next year, the company switched from the Continental inline six engine, offering either Chevrolet 230 cu in (3.8 L) overhead-valve I6s or 283 cu in (4.64 L) small block V8s. The Continental F-226 was an L-head design that was built for reliability and longevity with an output of 89 hp (66 kW); however, the special features meant they were sold to Checker at a loss, so when Continental raised the price of the engine, Teledyne Continental vice president Bill Rutherford recalled the company lost the Checker account and that "everybody was mad at us. But we stopped the losses, or 'advertising' expense" of overbuilt engines. It was the last automotive application for the venerable Continental design, as the company had moved on to specialize in aviation engines after the war. Checker went on to incorporate an ever higher percentage of GM parts.

By the 1970s the Checker cab design was several automotive generations old. As the decade started, the Checker A11 design had been in production for close to twenty years. A11 design elements could be attributed to a 1950 clay design. Some chassis components retained ancestral linkage to the 1939 Model A design.

Models A11 and A12 (Marathon) data
Model	Engine	Power	Transmission	Wheelbase	Length	Width	Ground clearance
Marathon	250 CID I6	145 hp (108 kW) (1971); 110 hp (82 kW) (1978)	3-speed automatic	120 in (3,048 mm)	204 in (5,182 mm)	76 in (1,930 mm)	7.5 in (191 mm)
A11E	350 CID V8	245 hp (183 kW) (1971); 160 hp (120 kW) (1978)	3-speed automatic	129 in (3,277 mm)	213 in (5,410 mm)	76 in (1,930 mm)	7.5 in (191 mm)

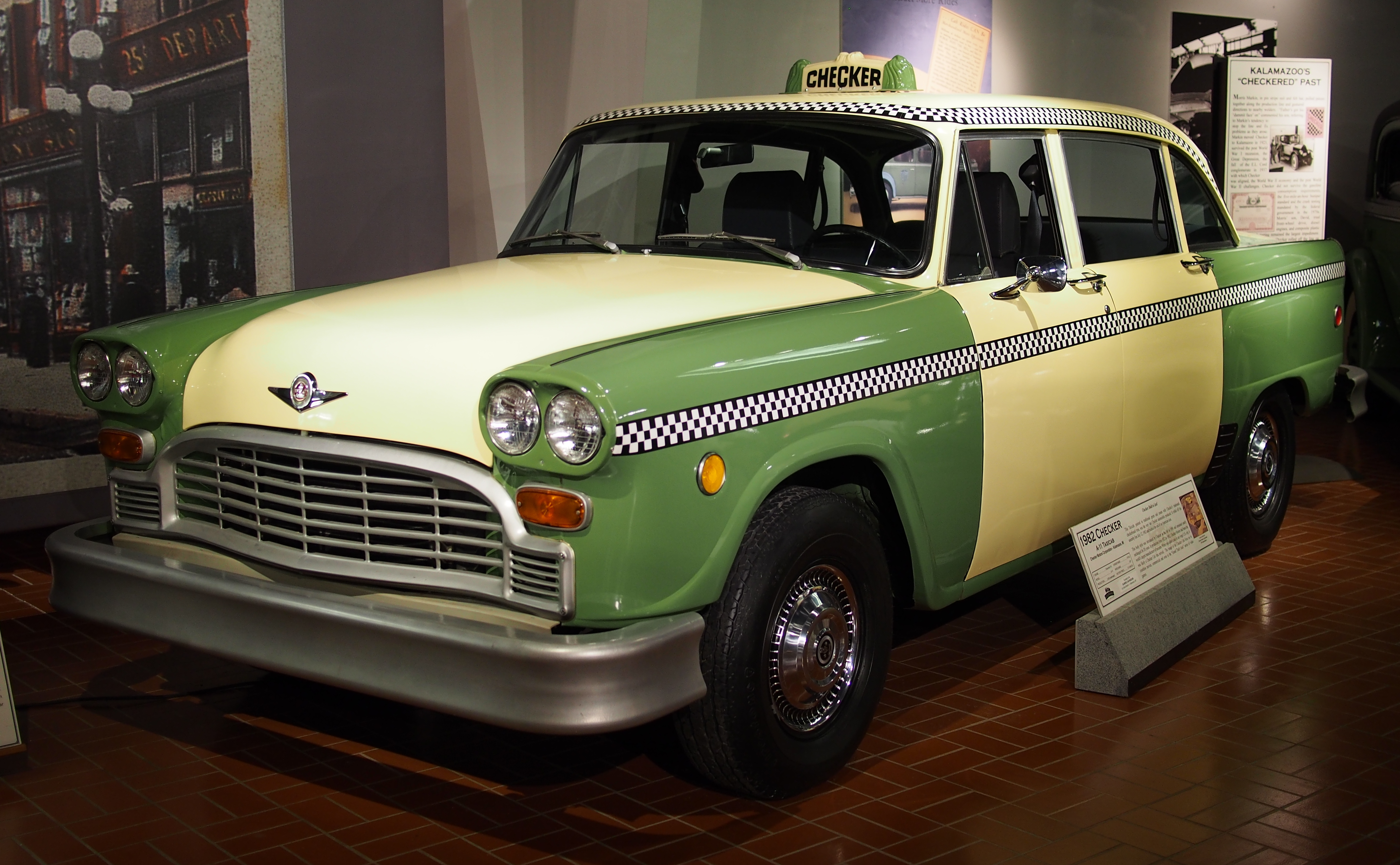
1982 Checker taxicab in green and cream with Checker's trademark checkerboard trim. This example is the very last automobile produced by the company, and today it resides in the Gilmore Car Museum in Hickory Corners.

The A11 and A12 were still produced throughout the 1970s and into the early 1980s, albeit in ever-smaller numbers and updated for Federal safety and emissions requirements. In July 1982, the last Checker automobile left the Kalamazoo assembly plant. It was an A11 Taxi, painted in Chicago green and ivory livery. Checker was now out of the automobile manufacturing business.

=== Epilogue ===
The last operating Checker Cab in New York City, an A11 built in 1978 with plate #1N11 and nicknamed "Janie", was retired in on July 26, 1999, as a New York City taxicab ordinance passed in 1996 requires that livery vehicles be replaced after six years of service. Janie, which racked up 994,972 mi (1,601,252 km) during her service, has since been sold at auction in 1999 (US$134,500), 2006 ($9,400), and 2015 ($7,700).

Today, the vast majority of Checker automobiles are gone, having spent hard lives as taxicabs over rough city streets. Most survivors are from the later A11 and A12 models, and occasionally come up for sale at collector car shows and Internet sites. Virtually all of the pre-1960 models are gone with the exception of a handful of cars in museums, since they were never prized as collector cars.

Pre-war survivors include two Model H (one owned by the Gilmore Car Museum and the other in Hollywood), one Model G pickup, one Model T, two Model Ms (a taxi and a farm truck), and two Model Ys (one sedan and one two truck conversion). Only one 1939 Model A is known to exist. It has been restored and resides in a private collection.

A few post-war Checkers are in the hands of collectors. Approximately one dozen Checker Model A2s survive in Finland, which had imported 500 ex-Chicago taxicabs for service during the 1952 Summer Olympics in Helsinki. Only one each of the Checker Model A3 and A4 exist and they are currently owned by a private Checker collector. Five Checker A8s (one wrecked) survive and are also owned by private collectors.

The largest collection of restored Checker Cabs is held at the National Auto & Truck Museum in Auburn, Indiana, which acquired six cars as a donation in 2012. Ben Merkel, who owns and operates Twilight Taxi Parts, had approximately 80 Checker Cabs in 2003. Twilight Taxi donated the 1981 A11 which is now on exhibit at the Henry Ford Museum.

The very last Checker automobile assembled, the 1982 A11 Chicago Taxi, resides in the Gilmore Car Museum in Hickory Corners, Michigan. Never having seen taxi use, it remains brand-new with less than 10 miles on its odometer. The Gilmore Museum also owns a 1923 Model H2, one of the first to be assembled in Kalamazoo, and a Model Y. Yellow Cab of New London, Connecticut owns the only surviving Model M. The Auburn Cord Duesenberg Automobile Museum owns the only surviving Model T. Also present is the 1978 A11 "Cab 804," made famous in the television show "Taxi." Painted in NYC livery, it remains basically new with less than 400 total miles on the odometer.

== Consumer vehicles ==
An advertisement depicting the sedan and station wagon variants of the Checker Marathon that appeared in the August 1967 issue of National Geographic.

From 1922 to 1947, Checker's production vehicles were built almost exclusively for the commercial livery (taxi) business, although cars for personal use were available upon request. In 1947 the Checker Model A3 was introduced. The major difference between the A2 Taxicab was the inclusion of a full front bench seat and opening trunk. Checker had limited success with the A3 pleasure car.

Checker needed to enter the consumer vehicle market when taxi sales declined. New York City sales dropped significantly due to the new 1954 taxi commission regulations that expanded big three competition in the market. Checker needed to enter the retail market to fill plant capacity lost to the big 3. In 1956 Checker started to expand its distribution channel with the introduction of regional sales offices. When Checker introduced the Checker Model A8, it officially entered the retail sale market. Articles and reviews were generated in Consumer Reports and Motor Trend magazine. Sales were phased in regionally across the US in 1959, starting in New York and New England. Nationally, introduction of the Checker Superba took place at the Chicago Auto Show on February 8, 1960. Checker continued to expand its dealer network on a regional basis. The first new market after New York City was Boston and parts of New England.

The dealer network continued to grow throughout the early 1960s. Four-door sedans and station wagons (Superba and Marathon models) also were advertised to individual customers in upscale publications. The ads emphasized the durability of the Checker and the attention to quality improvements. In 1962, almost 3,000 cars were sold to individuals—20% of production—but that percentage declined to 10% in the 1970s.

=== A10 Superba and A12 Marathon ===
Third-generation Checker Cab passenger vehicles
Model (year)	Engine	HP	wheelbase	Passengers
Model A10 (1960–62)	6-cylinder	80	120 in (3,048 mm)	6
Model A10W (1960–62)	6-cyl OHV	122	120 in (3,048 mm)	6 (1960–61); 8 (1962)
Model A12 & A12W (1963–64)	6-cylinder	80	120 in (3,048 mm)	6 (A12); 8 (A12W)
Model A12 & A12W (1963–64)	6-cyl OHV	141	120 in (3,048 mm)	6 (A12); 8 (A12W)
Model A19E/A12E (1963–64)	6-cylinder	80	129 in (3,277 mm)	8
Model A19E/A12E (1963–64)	6-cyl OHV	141	129 in (3,277 mm)	8
Model A12 & A12W (1965–67)	6-cyl OHV 230	140	120 in (3,048 mm)	6 (A12); 8 (A12W)
Model A12 & A12W (1965–67)	8-cyl OHV 283	195	120 in (3,048 mm)	6 (A12); 8 (A12W)
Model A12E (1965–67)	6-cyl OHV 230	140	129.5 in (3,289 mm)	8
Model A12E (1965–67)	8-cyl OHV 283	195	129.5 in (3,289 mm)	8
Model A12 & A12W (1968)	6-cyl OHV 230	140	120 in (3,048 mm)	6 (A12); 8 (A12W)
Model A12 & A12W (1968)	8-cyl OHV 307	200	120 in (3,048 mm)	6 (A12); 8 (A12W)
Model A12 & A12W (1968)	8-cyl OHV 327	235	120 in (3,048 mm)	6 (A12); 8 (A12W)
Model A12 & A12W (1969)	6-cyl OHV 250	155	120 in (3,048 mm)	6 (A12); 8 (A12W)
Model A12 & A12W (1969)	8-cyl OHV 327	235	120 in (3,048 mm)	6 (A12); 8 (A12W)
Model A12 & A12W (1969)	8-cyl OHV 350	300	120 in (3,048 mm)	6 (A12); 8 (A12W)
Model A12 (1970–75) & A12W (1970–74)	6-cyl OHV 250	100–155	120 in (3,048 mm)	6 (A12); 8 (A12W)
Model A12 (1970–75) & A12W (1970–74)	8-cyl OHV 350	145–250	120 in (3,048 mm)	6 (A12); 8 (A12W)

The A10/A12 consumer car designs were derived from the A8/A9/A11 taxicabs. The A8 was Checker's response to new New York City taxi laws that mandated taxis could not run on a chassis wheelbase longer than 120 in (3,000 mm). Civilian models were as utilitarian as their fleet counterparts, sporting a simple, flat dashboard with round gauges (this would remain unchanged up to the final Checkers in 1982), rubber mats instead of carpeting and hardboard ceilings. Floors were flat to allow easy entry and exit. Checker cars and taxicabs used the same basic body and chassis design from 1956 until production ceased, as Morris Markin declared that there would be no major changes as long as there was a demand for the car. However, numerous alterations in the appearance of the cars were made throughout production, especially in the late 1960s and 1970s.

In February 1960 Checker introduced the Checker Superba nationally, its first model specifically built for the consumer market. In its initial year, the civilian sedans and station wagons were marketed as the Superba Standard or Superba Special. Vehicle Identification Numbers had three parts, starting with the model code, then the production order, and then the serial number, which started at 37396. The sedans carried a model code of A10 and the wagons were coded as WA10. The wagons were more expensive (suggested retail price was US$2896 for the Superba Standard wagon, compared to US$2542 for the Standard sedan, with corresponding Special prices being approximately $100 more) and 370 lb (170 kg) heavier. The only engine was the Continental inline six, which had been used in dozens of cars (including Kaiser-Frazer) and trucks since the 1930s. Two versions were offered: a low-compression L-head unit with only 80 hp (60 kW) in the sedans and an OHV unit for the wagons with higher compression and 122 hp (91 kW). There were few changes for 1961: the Superba Special was renamed to the Marathon and model codes for 1961 and 1962 were W/10L (sedan) and W/A10 (wagon) instead. 1962 was the last year for the A10 model codes. Wagons came standard with a motorized fold-down rear seat, which — combined with different bodies — pushed the price $350 above the sedan. Three-on-the-tree manual shift was standard, and a Borg-Warner three-speed automatic with optional overdrive was an option.

In 1963, model codes switched to A12 (sedan) and A12W (wagon) and a long-wheelbase limousine (the Marathon Town Custom) was introduced with model code A19E, riding on a wheelbase extended to 129 in (3,300 mm). The high-compression OHV 6 was made optional for all vehicles. For 1964, which was the last year for the Continental 6, the Superba name was dropped and the Town Custom model code was revised to A12E. Some of the 1964 Checkers were revised later to be part of the 1965 model year if their serial number was higher than 20000. This also was the year that Chevrolet engines and transmissions were offered; the standard engine was the "Turbo-Thrift" 230 I-6 and the optional engine was the small block 283 V-8; an optional 2-speed Turbo Hydramatic could be specified as a $248 option instead of the standard 3-speed Warner Gear manual transmission. A second engine option, the small block 327 V-8, was added for 1966. The A12E extended-wheelbase sedan was dropped for the 1967 model year, but presumably was available as a special order as Aerobus production continued.

Starting in 1967, an energy-absorbing steering column was fitted to meet safety regulations, similar in appearance to AMC's column. Round side marker lights on each fender were added in 1968. Seat belts were fitted as mandated by the United States government, including shoulder belts on Checkers built after December 1967. The 1969 cars got high-rise headrests and 1970 models adopted the government-required steering column and shift lever lock. The 1974 Checkers eschewed the attractive, chrome-plated bumpers for girder-like, aluminum-painted units. The 1975 models featured the catalytic converter emissions device, which came with an "Unleaded Fuel Only" label for both fuel gauge and fuel filler.

During the 1970s, Checkers adopted a standard Chevrolet steering column assembly, including steering wheel (without the "Chevrolet" badges), shift lever and ignition switch. The 1978 and later models can be identified when Chevrolet switched to a "Delta Spoke" steering wheel design, duly used on Checkers. The rear fold-down jump seats were also removed, as they failed all safety tests. Parallel-action windshield wipers also appeared on the 1978 models.

Checker's cars were lightly marketed, using campaigns that centered on their durability and unchanging style. Checker promoted its vehicles as 200,000 mi (320,000 km) cars at a time when most United States automakers shied away from mileage promises. Overall, Checker sales began shrinking in the 1970s, causing the company to reduce its production capacity. Limousines were dropped after 1970 and wagons followed in 1974. The standard-wheelbase sedans remained until the end. Production of the Checker consumer vehicles was approximately 1,000 vehicles per year from 1960 through 1968; annual production fell sharply in 1969 to 760 and never recovered to more than 1,000 per year before Checker stopped production in 1982. This decline was due to a number of factors:

- First, the oil embargo of 1973-1974 (and later the 1979-1982 recession) caused the Big Three to lose consumer sales, and they attempted to make up for this by targeting the fleet market more aggressively.
- Many of the body stamping dies were worn out after 20 years of use, and that required manual body adjustments by body-and-fender mechanics to make the parts fit. The fenders and doors were the most problematic, as taxis are involved in numerous minor accidents due to their heavy usage.
- As a low-volume manufacturer, Checker could not compete on price, which due to inflation had risen to almost $5,000 by the middle of the 1970s. This was Buick and Chrysler territory, and a large sum for a dated design with unimpressive build quality. Safety and emissions requirements added further costs.
- Meanwhile, the company refused several proposals for a replacement to its 20-year-old design.

With the Marathon outmoded and not selling in viable quantities, and with no resources to develop a new model, Checker decided to leave the auto manufacturing business. The last models were produced for the 1982 model year, and the final automobile rolled off the assembly line on July 12, 1982, after members of the Markin family decided to end production rather than meet labor demands.

=== Mechanical ===
The car had very poor fuel economy, as the tall front end and engine compartment had been designed for a Continental 226-cubic-inch inline six, which required the large engine compartment. In 1964, Checker ceased using Continental engines. Continental had been losing money on each unit sold to Checker for several years and Checker was not interested in a price increase. Checker experimented with several engine options, including the Chrysler 318. Eventually it went to a Chevrolet straight six. That engine, along with an optional Chevrolet V8, was used until the late 1970s. Engines and drivetrains matched the full-sized Chevrolet models. During the 1970s the Impala's Turbo-Hydramatic 400 transmission was fitted to all Checker sedans. Some of the last Checkers built were equipped with Oldsmobile 350 Diesel V8s.

When GM discontinued the straight six in its full-sized Chevrolet models for 1980, Checker purchased a small V6 that was also used in the big Chevrolets. However, the large and tall grille and hood made for poor aerodynamics, which contributed to the car's poor fuel economy. A number of the V6s were converted to use propane as fuel.

== Failed replacement projects ==
In the 1970s and 1980s, Checker initiated several projects aimed at developing a modern taxi that would allow Checker to produce cars into the next century. The US went through two energy crises in 1973 and 1979, adding motivation for Checker to consider developing a modern fuel efficient taxi that would allow the company to produce cars into the next century. The changes in the market were also making it harder and harder for Checker to find suitable off-the-shelf parts for its existing heavy vehicle, as General Motors (and Detroit overall) moved to producing lighter cars.

=== Project Galva ===
Several projects were executed in the 1970s in the attempt to develop a new Checker. In 1974, US Steel and prototype builder Autodynamics of Madison Heights, Michigan, proposed a new Checker idea called “Galva” to CMC. The plan was to design a new Checker using newly developed manufacturing techniques to produce a vehicle with a reduced amount of tooling. Unfortunately, the project never got off the drawing board; Checker management was happy and profitable. Checker would continue to produce the A11 and various other specialty cars.

=== Volkswagen project ===
In March 1977, seven years after the death of Morris Markin, retired GM President Ed Cole and car dealer Victor Potamkin bought into Checker with the intent of re-energizing the company and developing a new, more modern Checker. With Cole as President of Checker's taxicab operating company, they planned to purchase partially completed Volkswagen Rabbits from VW's new Westmoreland Assembly Plant in Pennsylvania. After shipping the Volkswagens to the Checker Motors factory in Kalamazoo, they would cut them in half and insert a section to lengthen the car, as well as raising the roof, and then sell the modified vehicles as taxis. Cole had forecasted that they could sell 50,000 a year, but less than 90 days after joining Checker, Cole died when his plane crashed near Kalamazoo in May 1977. In August 1977, the Checker-VW project was introduced in Road & Track magazine. The project was scrapped shortly after when it was determined that the Volkswagen was not suitable for taxi service. In 2019, a prototype Checker-VW taxi was found in a former dealership in Kalamazoo after being stored there for an estimated three decades.

=== X-body project ===
In the early 1980s, by way of a series of financial transactions, David Markin monetized CMC. Potamkin and Cole's widow were paid out and both exited the company. Markin had total control of CMC again and the funds available to produce a new Checker. Moving beyond the Rabbit/Golf project, Checker's next attempt at a new taxicab was initiated via a partnership with General Motors' Fisher Body division and Autodynamics. In 1980, General Motors introduced the X-Car line which was a major departure from traditional GM design. It was a front-wheel-drive platform with a transverse engine, similar to the BMC Mini concept. The new Checker was to be front wheel drive, ironic as this concept was first tested by Checker in the mid-1940s with the Model D project. The planned partnership would have Checker purchase Chevrolet Citation “bodies-in-white” and then Checker would assemble them for taxicab use. The project did produce one prototype Citation test mule, but the project was short-lived, and the prototype was destroyed.

=== Galva II ===
Checker's final attempts at introducing a new taxicab came in early 1981. CMC signed a contract with Autodynamics to develop a new model. The project was called Galva II, an extension of the project originally begun back in 1974. Autodynamics developed a design that would use the latest GM components developed under the GM X car program. If successful, Checker could retrofit GM components as developed on a Checker-built body and would not have to rely on the Citation body.

The new taxicabs were designed as a line of front-wheel-drive hatchbacks with varying wheelbases of 109, 120, or 129 in (2,800, 3,000, or 3,300 mm) wheelbases. The target weight was 2,800 lb (1,300 kg), a reduction of approximately 30% compared to the A11/A12, but for durability, the taxicab would be built as a body on frame. It was intended to use a Chevrolet 173 cu.in. (2.8L) V-6 engine. Fisher Body was also involved in the Galva project. Plans were made for Fisher to supply various body components: door locks, windows regulators, door hinges and door handles.

Consistent with the original Galva 1974 project, the new Checker would be based on limited tooling. Paul E. Newman of Autodynamics was quoted in Automobiles Quarterly: "We had a particular build concept for them (Checker). It involved a low cost tooling and break form panels". Howard E. Klausmeier of Autodynamics was quoted in Automotive News: "The intent is to standardize componentry and simplify tooling and manufacturing as much as possible. The only curved glass will be the windshield. All other glass is flat. In addition, the components provide easy replacement for repair and maintenance using simplified attachment systems."

In November 1981, Sab Hori describes more details of the new Checker for automotive writer John Melrose: "We're going to try and do everything we can to make the cab easy to service ... We'll have bolt-on fenders, possibly of plastic, and we’re considering bolt-on door panels made from either RIM (reinforced injection molding) or SMC (sheet molding compound) plastic because if a panel is damaged it would be easier to replace. The fenders will be friendly, flexible type, like those on Oldsmobile's new sport Omega. We're also thinking about plastic hoods, rear hatch doors and facias because the tooling costs are lower. As a low-volume producer, we have the advantage of not worrying about the slow cycle times needed in making plastic parts. And what we're trying to do is go as far as possible with proven technology. Checker is so small that we can’t afford to be the leaders; we’ve got to be followers."

The new Checker would have a fully independent rear suspension. The design was based on a Firestone-developed system called the Marsh Mellow, a fabric reinforced rubber cylinder. A striking solution for Checker, the Marsh Mellow spring was known for reliability, corrosion resistance, low cost, and basic simplicity. Best of all from Checker's point of view, unlike a conventional rear leaf spring, if a Marsh Mellow spring fails, the cab would not have been taken off the road immediately. This feature would endear it to taxi fleets. Surely it could handle the pot -holed streets of New York City.

At the time of design, Head of CMC Engineering Sab Hori was quoted in Automotive News, “The New Generation of taxicab design will be a four door hatchback designed with identical bumpers, glass, lighting, engines, transmissions, and front/rear end styling. All four models will have surround-type frames, extended for longer vehicles”, indicating like CMC models of the past, several variation of wheelbase and configurations would be available.

David Markin was also quoted in Automotive News, stating that “[t]he new vehicle will be sold to both fleet operators and private individuals." Plans called for three different wheelbases: 109 in (2,800 mm) for six passengers, 122 in (3,100 mm) for eight passengers, and 128 in (3,300 mm) for seating nine and a raised-roof paratransit vehicle with wheelchair capabilities.

Ultimately, the project was killed. Balancing the required investment in the new Checker compared to making similar investments in the third party production business, Checker opted out of automobile production.
