= Morris Markin =

Russian-born American businessman

- Born: Zalman Tamarkin; July 15, 1893; Smolensk, Russian Empire
- Died: July 8, 1970 (aged 76)
- Known for: founder of Checker Motors Corporation

Morris Markin (Russian: Морис Маркин; July 15, 1893 – July 8, 1970) was a Russian-born American businessman who founded the Checker Cab Manufacturing Company (which would later become the Checker Motors Corporation).

== Early years ==
Markin was born into a Jewish family in Smolensk, a city in western Russia. He worked in a clothing factory during his young years, working his way up to supervisor by the age of nineteen. At twenty-two he emigrated to the United States. When he arrived at Ellis Island in November 1912, he spoke no English and couldn't afford to pay the bond required to enter the country. A janitor at the facility loaned him the necessary twenty-five dollars.

From New York City, Markin went to Chicago to live with his uncle. He held several jobs as an errand boy, the last for a tailor who taught him the trade. On his death, Markin purchased the business on credit from the widow. He worked hard and saved enough money to bring seven brothers and two sisters to the States. Markin then partnered with one of the brothers and opened a factory which made pants under government contracts during World War I. This company prospered after the war.

== Formation of Checker Cab ==
Around 1920 Markin loaned fifteen-thousand-dollars to an engineer named Lomberg, who owned a struggling auto body manufacturing company. When it failed, Lomberg asked Markin for more money. Markin refused and took over the company in 1921 as collateral for his debt.

He then acquired another failed automobile manufacturer, Commonwealth Motors. Markin purchased the defunct Handley-Knight chassis plant and the Dort Motor Car Company body plant in Kalamazoo, Michigan. He moved his entire operation to Kalamazoo, and on February 2, 1922 formed the Checker Cab Manufacturing Company.

In 1929, he purchased the Yellow Cab Company from John Hertz.

Markin died in 1970. His son David became president of Checker.
