= Parmelee System =

American livery and cartage company

Parmelee Transportation System
- Industry: Livery and cartage
- Founded: 1853; 172 years ago
- Founder: Franklin Parmelee
- Defunct: 1930s
- Fate: Acquired by Checker Motors Corporation
- Headquarters: United States

The Parmelee Transportation System was a livery and cartage company established in the United States in 1853. In the early 20th Century, Parmelee provided taxi cab service in U.S. cities where it had franchise (purchased rights) to do so. The company was acquired by Morris Markin of the Checker Motors Corporation in the 1930s and remained under Checker control until the mid-1960s.
