= Yellow Cab Company =

Chicago-based taxicab company (1907–2015)

- Company type: Subsidiary
- Founded: 1907; 119 years ago
- Founder: John D. Hertz Walden W. Shaw
- Defunct: 2015
- Fate: Split into multiple companies upon bankruptcy
- Owner: Chicago Yellow Cab Company (1925–1929); Morris Markin (1929–1996); Patton Corrigan (1996–2005); Michael Levine (2005–2015)

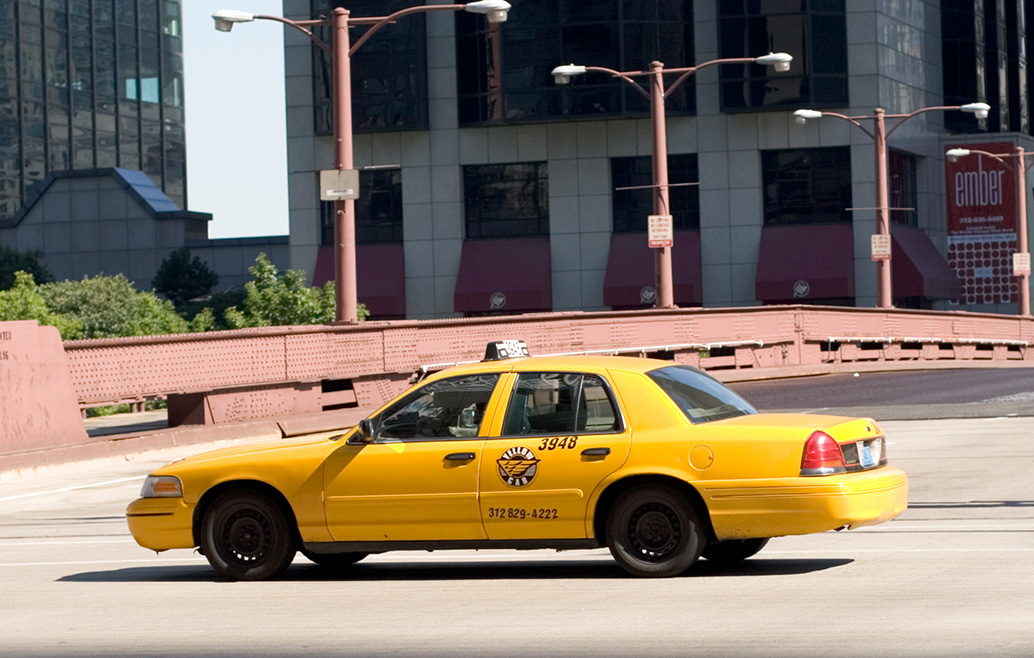
Chicago yellow cab

The Yellow Cab Company is a taxicab company founded in Chicago in 1907 and today operating as a remnant of a once large manufacturing and transportation operation. Its rapid growth in the late 1910s and 1920s innovated a new kind of taxi company, one which covered the entire city limits, promising a cab to any address in ten minutes or less. In establishing its service, the Yellow Cab Company developed many of the procedures and safety protocols that would be adopted by taxi companies around the country.

In 1916 the Yellow Cab Manufacturing Company was created, producing taxicabs, including for the Yellow Cab Company. The Yellow Cab Company's meteoric success also invited bitter competition on the city's streets, leading to a period known as the "Taxi Wars." During the Depression, Morris Markin, owner of Yellow Cab's rival Checker Cab Manufacturing Company, significantly consolidated ownership of the city's taxi companies, putting an end to the violence.

Yellow Cabs remain on the city's streets today, though ownership was split between multiple companies upon its declaration of bankruptcy in 2015.

== History ==
=== Formation ===
The Yellow Cab Company was co-founded as the Walden W. Shaw Livery Company in 1907 by Walden W. Shaw and John D. Hertz. On Aug. 2, 1915, the first 45 Yellow Cabs appeared on the streets of Chicago. These cabs differed from earlier Walden W. Shaw livery vehicles in that they were purpose-built as taxis and painted yellow for maximum visibility. Shaw and Hertz designed the Yellow Cabs themselves to be tough and lightweight, to both improve fuel efficiency and reduce operating costs. Unlike Walden W. Shaw Livery vehicles, which operated on an account-based system of payment, Yellow Cabs could be hailed directly on the street or by calling the main garage dispatch center, and payment was taken in cash at the conclusion of each ride.

=== Yellow Cab Manufacturing Company ===
In 1916, Shaw and Hertz formed the Walden W. Shaw Manufacturing Company to manufacture Yellow Cab taxicabs. In 1920, when Walden W. Shaw retired from the company, the name was changed to the Yellow Cab Manufacturing Company. The company produced all of the Yellow Cabs in Chicago's fleet, and sold cabs to other Yellow Cab franchises and taxi companies around the world. In 1925, General Motors acquired the Yellow Cab Manufacturing branch of the business and renamed it Yellow Truck and Coach Manufacturing. As part of the deal, Hertz joined General Motors as the president of its Board of Directors.

=== Acquisition of Parmelee ===
In 1917, Shaw and Hertz acquired the taxi division of the Parmelee Transfer Company. Charles McCulloch, the manager of that division, continued in that role at Yellow Cab and joined the Board of Directors of the Walden W. Shaw Corporation. After acquiring Parmelee's taxi division, Yellow Cab retired their cars and replaced them with 200 Yellow Cabs on the city's streets.

=== Taxi wars ===
During the 1910s and 1920s the company was involved in multiple incidents of intimidation, harassment and violence with taxi drivers from other companies. In 1921, a Yellow Cab driver named Thomas A. Skirven, Jr. was shot and killed while standing outside a Yellow Cab garage. Two Checker Taxi drivers were eventually convicted of his murder. This began a period of particularly bitter relations between Yellow Cab and Checker Taxi which led to shootings, targeted murders and firebombings. This period eventually led to the involvement in the taxi industry of mobsters associated with the Chicago Outfit and other powerful gangs during Prohibition.

By 1925 the company was a subsidiary of the Chicago Yellow Cab Company, a public holding company with shares equally divided between Hertz, and a small group of other investors.

=== Sale to Markin ===
Hertz sold his remaining interest in the Yellow Cab Company in 1929 to Morris Markin, who had established Checker Cab Manufacturing Company as a driver cooperative with the Checker Taxi. Hertz had decided to focus on car rentals (later Hertz Rent-a-Car which still uses a yellow logo). The sale was prompted by the violence associated with the business that culminated in 1928 in his racing stables being destroyed in a $200,000 fire in which 11 thoroughbred horses died.

From 1930 till 1982 Yellow Cab of Chicago sourced all of their taxicab fleet from Markin's Checker Motors Corp. of Kalamazoo, Michigan. Holding a near monopoly of taxicab operations in Chicago, the majority of Chicago taxicabs were purpose built Checker Cabs spanning three generations.

=== More sales, bankruptcy, evolution ===
Yellow Cab Co. was sold again in 1996 to Patton Corrigan, who in turn sold controlling interest in 2005 to Michael Levine, a third-generation taxicab operator from New York City. The Levine/Corrigan group purchased the Checker Taxi affiliation in Chicago, to reunite the two companies once again. In 2015, Yellow Cab of Chicago filed for bankruptcy. Yellow Cab Co eventually split into multiple companies nationwide bearing the Yellow Cab name. In January 2016, San Francisco's Yellow Cab cooperative filed for bankruptcy protection.

Since the bankruptcy, many of the companies that continue to carry the Yellow Cab name have struggled to compete with rideshare services such as Uber and Lyft that have drivers use their own personal vehicles for services traditionally provided by Yellow Cab and generally have much lower fares than traditional taxicabs. In some cities such as Pittsburgh, Yellow Cab even changed their business model to match ridesharing services by using a smartphone app and converted their drivers from employees to independent contractors while still being able to hail a taxicab in the traditional sense.
