= Checker Series E =

Transit bus series

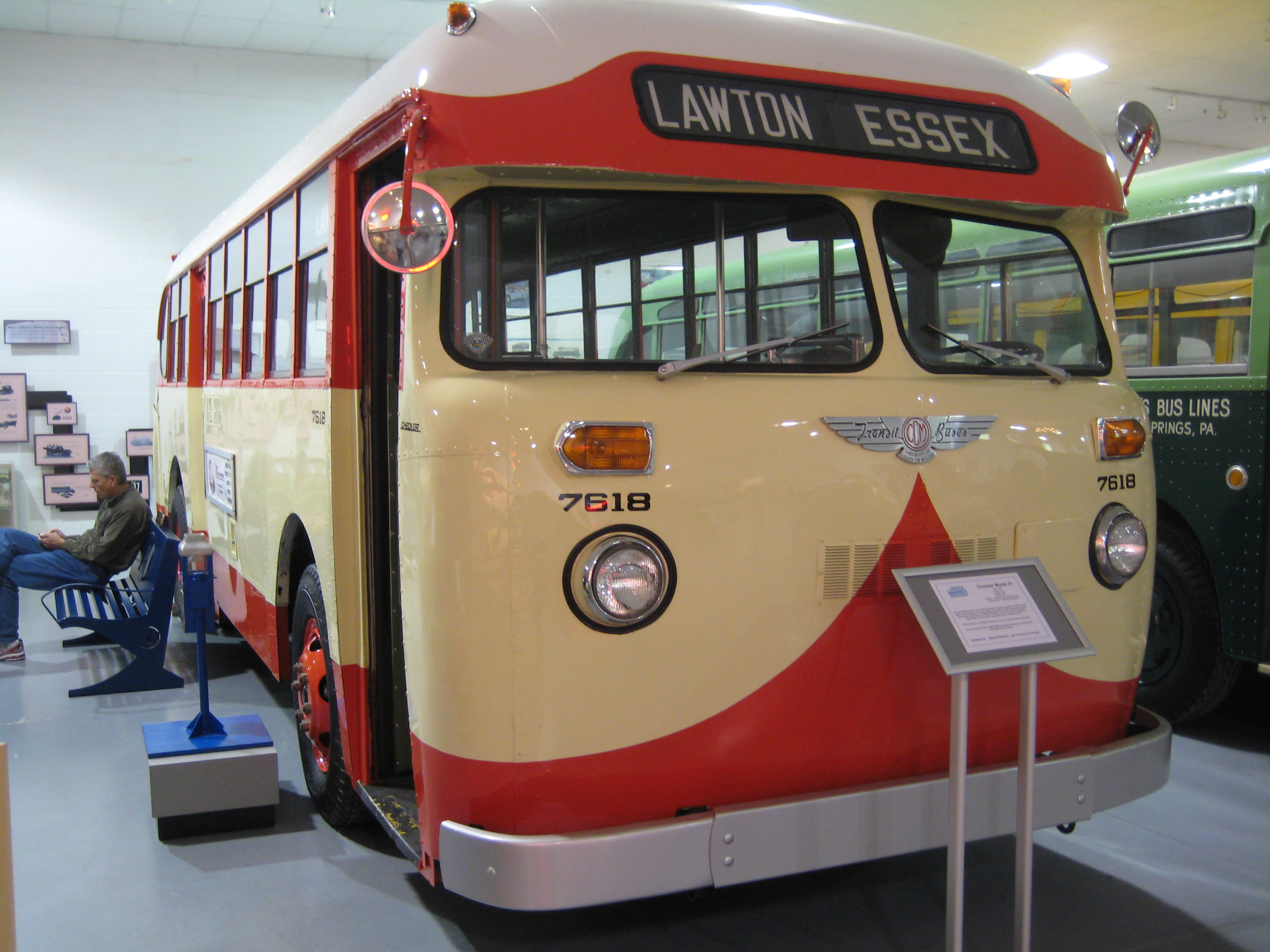
Restored ex-DSR bus 7618 built by Checker at the AACA Museum in Hershey, Pennsylvania

The Checker Series E were transit buses sold by Checker Cab Manufacturing Corporation from 1951 to 1953, using a body built by the Union City Body Company (UCBC) of Union City, Indiana, on a chassis built by Checker in Kalamazoo, Michigan.

== History ==
The Series E bus was designed by Transit Buses, Inc. in 1948. Transit Buses had been formed as a joint venture between Ford Motor Company and UCBC in the 1930s; buses were assembled by UCBC by fitting their body to a Ford chassis, engine, and transmission. In 1947, Ford withdrew from the transit bus market and stopped supplying chassis and powertrains to Transit Buses; Transit Buses designed a new bus using the Continental I6 "Red Seal" engine and contracted Checker to build the chassis starting in 1948, with UCBC still responsible for final assembly in Union City. Checker acquired Transit Buses in 1950 and began marketing the bus as the Checker Series E in 1951. However, sales of the contemporaneous General Motors "Old Look" buses, originally designed by Yellow Coach, were much stronger and Checker withdrew the Series E in 1953.
