= Checker Model A =

1940s US taxicab

The Checker Model A is a taxicab produced by Checker Motors Corporation. The Model A was introduced mid-model year in 1939, and was built in 1941, when Checker switched over to wartime manufacturing, as did the rest of the automotive industry. The Model A was offered in a new landaulet version that included an electric disappearing top, an early sunroof. In addition, the new model came equipped with an automatic signal to warn pedestrians that the car was being reversed.

The car came with a Continental L-head inline six-cylinder engine and three-speed manual transmission. As was the case in previous Checkers, the Model A had open front fenders and rear-hinged doors. Headlight lenses were stylized and surrounded by heavy chrome bezels in Art Deco style. Approximately 1,250 Model As were produced, and they were a common sight on the streets of big cities like New York and Chicago. However, by the late 1940s they were mostly gone, victims of hard taxicab use over rough city streets.

Only one known surviving Model A exists today. It is restored and painted in a maroon and black two-tone finish and resides in upstate New York.

Dies to the Model A were lost after World War II, and Checker replaced this car with a new body design in 1947 (the Model A2); however the basic chassis and drivetrain of the Model A were retained.
