= Handley-Knight =

Defunct American motor vehicle manufacturer

The Handley-Knight (as it was originally known) was an automobile built in Kalamazoo, Michigan by Handley Motors Incorporated from 1921 to 1923. From its inception to early 1923, it used the sleeve valve four-cylinder Knight engine.

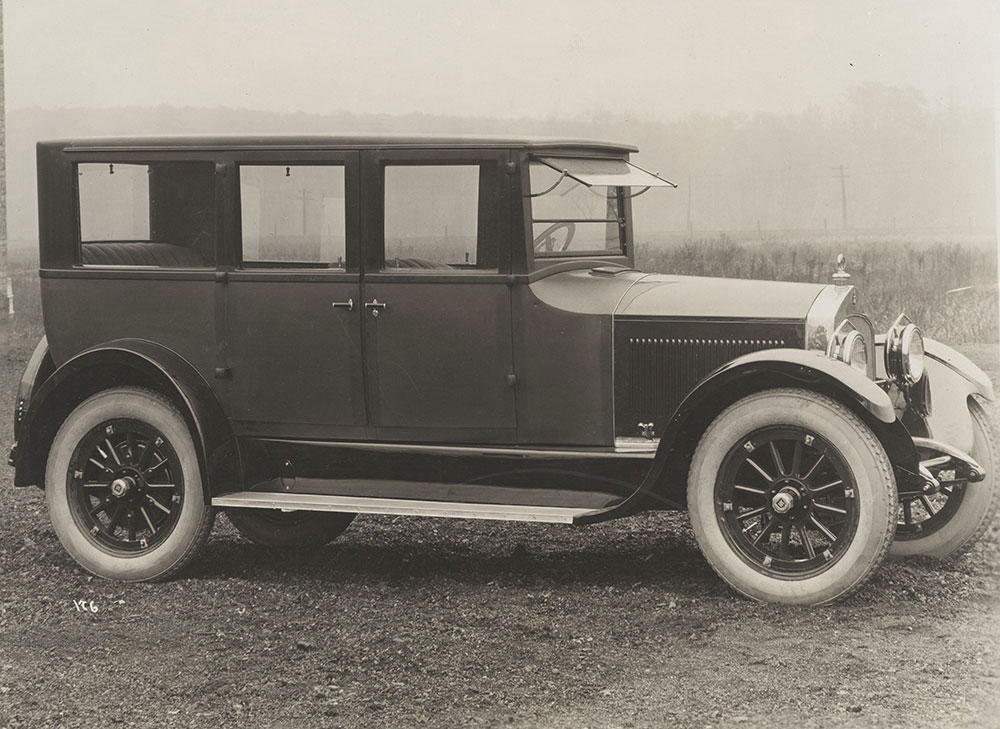
1922 Handley-Knight Model B 7-passenger sedan

The Models 6/60 and the 6/40 used Midwest and Falls six-cylinder engines. On both models, the small handle attachments (or loops) which encircled the upper sections of the headlamps were a distinctive styling feature. Their motto was, "If it carries handles, it's a Handley". The Checker Cab company bought the Handley plant in May 1923.
