= Yellow Cab Manufacturing Company =

Defunct American motor vehicle manufacturer

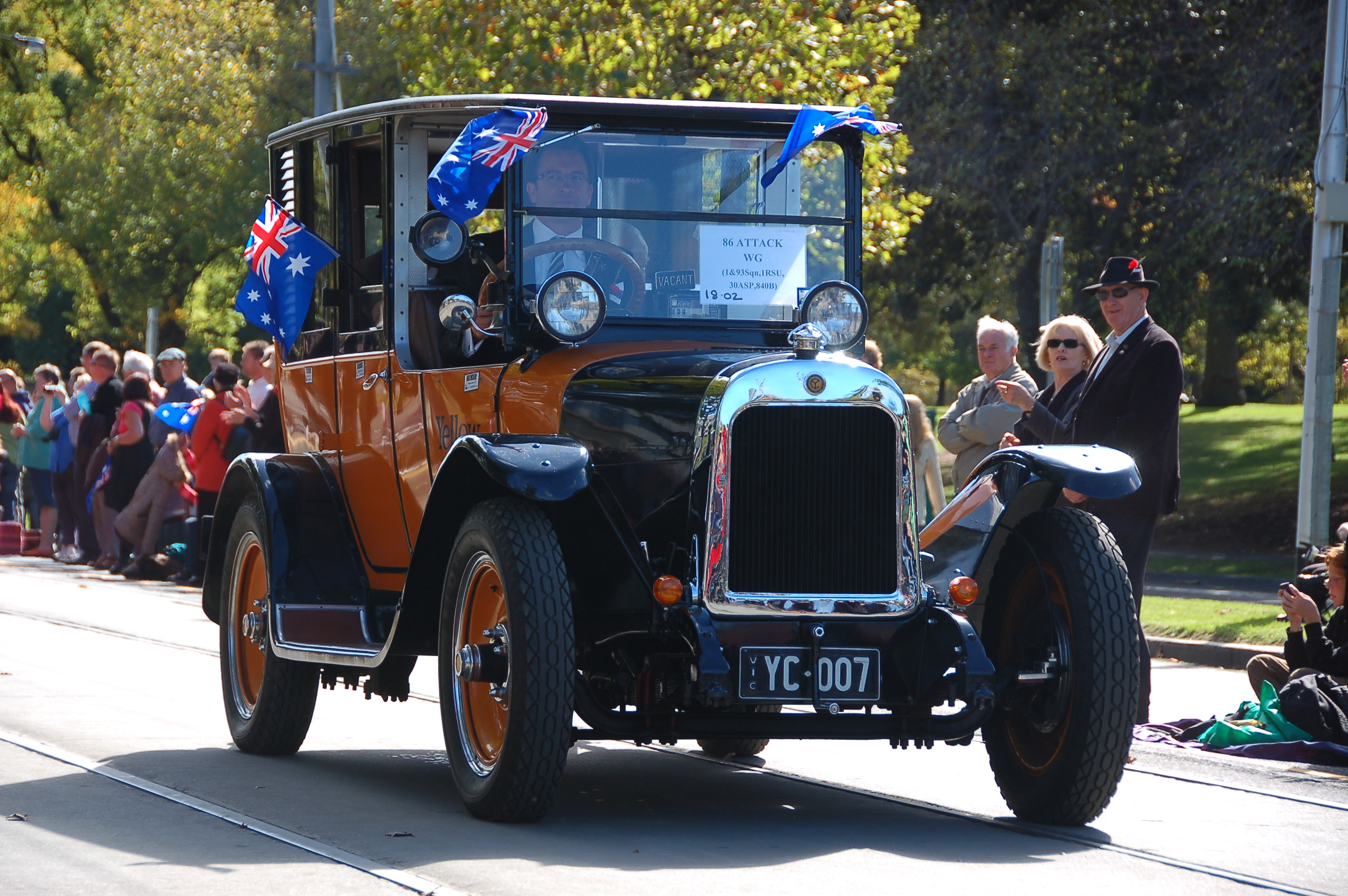
A 1922-1925 Yellow Cab in Australia

The Yellow Cab Manufacturing Company was a manufacturer of automobiles and light trucks in operation from 1920 to its 1925 sale to General Motors. It was formed through the renaming of the Walden W. Shaw Manufacturing Company upon Shaw's retirement, which had been established in 1916 by Yellow Cab Company owner/operators Shaw and partner John D. Hertz. Its primary product was taxicabs.

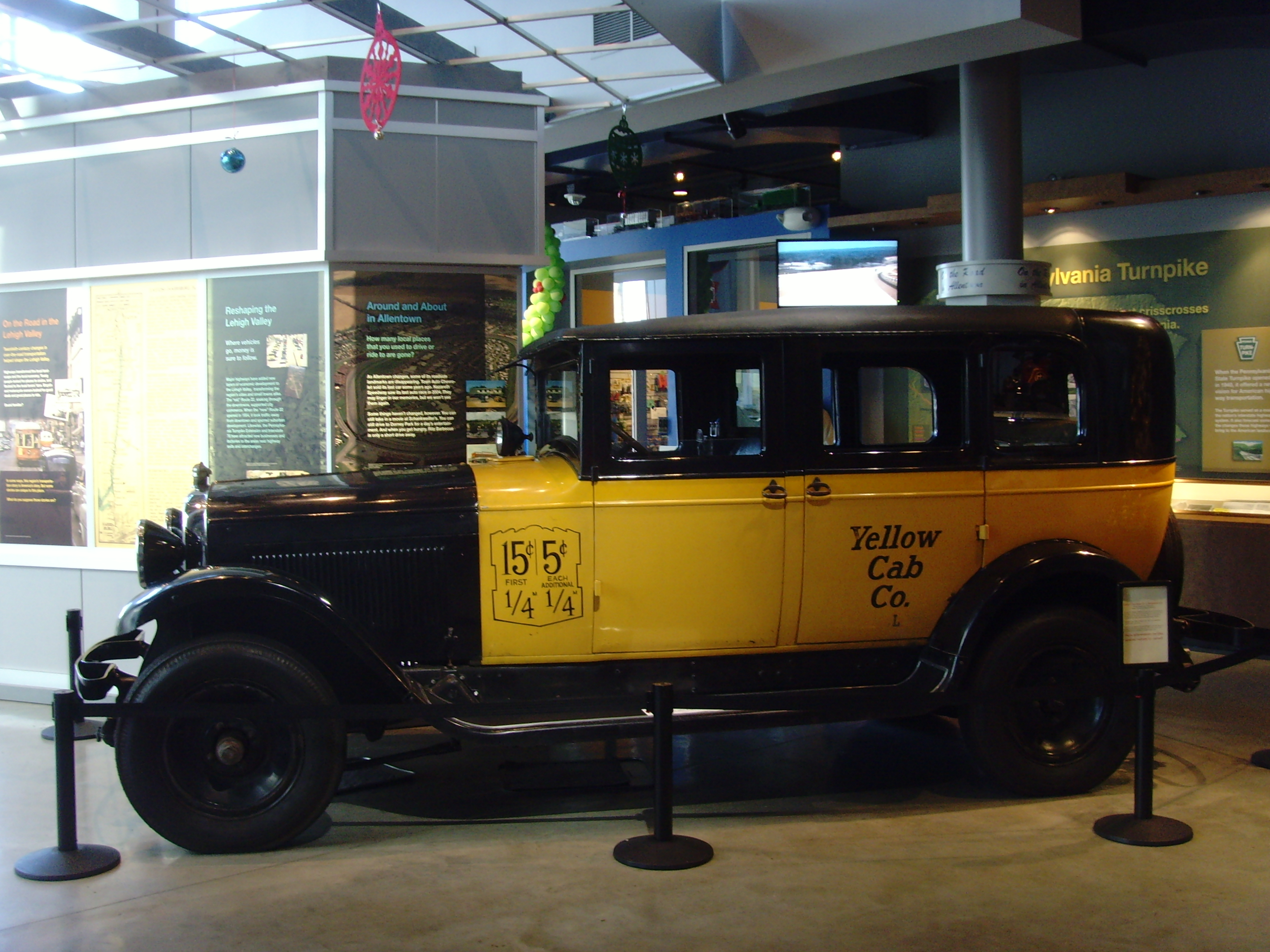
A General Motors-produced Yellow Cab from 1930, after the company's 1925 sale

The Yellow Cab Manufacturing Company was established in 1920 by Yellow Cab Company owner John D. Hertz after the retirement of his partner, Walden W. Shaw. The two had first founded the cab company together, then The Walden W. Shaw Manufacturing Company to produce taxis for it. The Shaw manufacturing company was renamed Yellow.

From 1921 the company manufactured Passenger Cars and Light Trucks and by 1923 its earning were $4,005,365. Hertz established the Yellow Coach Manufacturing Company as subsidiary of the Yellow Cab Company in that year.

The company was sold to General Motors in 1925.
