= Chicago Motor Coach Company =

Bus operator in Chicago, Illinois, US (1917–1952)

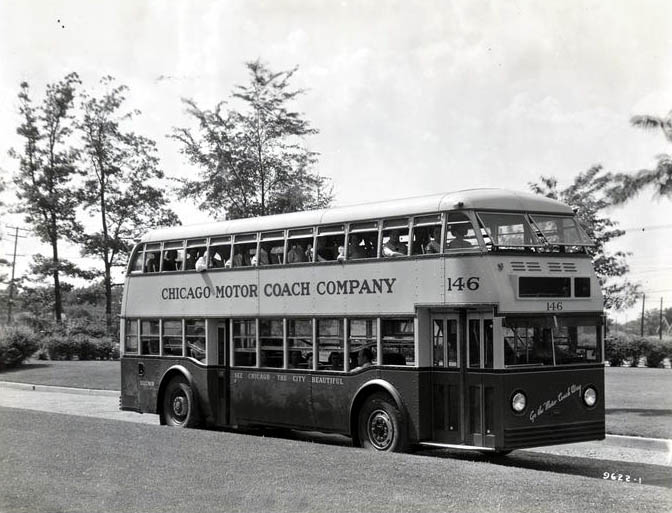
- A 72-passenger Chicago Motor Coach Company double decker bus built by Yellow Coach Corporation in 1936.
- Parent: The Omnibus Corporation
- Commenced operation: March 25, 1917; 109 years ago
- Defunct: October 1, 1952; 73 years ago
- Service area: Chicago, Illinois
- Service type: City bus

The Chicago Motor Coach Company was founded in 1917 by John D. Hertz to provide Chicago's first bus transportation services, primarily in places where streetcars were not able to travel. The company grew rapidly and was purchased by the Chicago Transit Authority (CTA) in 1952. It operated only motor coaches, whereas the larger Chicago Surface Lines and successor CTA also operated trolley coaches.

== History ==
John D. Hertz founded the Chicago Motor Coach Company in 1917 to run bus transport services in Chicago. During the period that he was running this company he was actively involved with many other transport businesses, including taxicab operation, taxicab manufacture, car rental and the manufacture of coaches and later cars.

He then formed the Yellow Coach Manufacturing Company in 1923 as a subsidiary of the Yellow Cab Company to manufacture buses, many of which were used by the Chicago Coach Company. Hertz sold a majority interest in the Yellow Coach Manufacturing Company to General Motors in 1925 and then the balance in 1943.

By the mid-1920s, the Chicago Coach Company operated with 423 buses and 1,800 employees serving 134 street miles within the city.

On October 1, 1952, the company's assets were purchased by the Chicago Transit Authority.

Additionally, there is a Chicago Motor Coach, Inc. that operates in the Chicago area separate from the original company.
