= Yellow Coach Manufacturing Company =

American manufacturer of passenger buses (1923-1943)

- Type: Subsidiary
- Industry: Automotive
- Founded: 1923
- Founder: John D. Hertz
- Defunct: 1943; 83 years ago
- Fate: Merged
- Headquarters: Chicago, U.S.
- Products: transit buses, electric-powered trolley buses, parlor coaches.
- Parent: Yellow Cab Company (1923–25); General Motors (1925–43)

The Yellow Coach Manufacturing Company (informally Yellow Coach) was an early manufacturer of passenger buses in the United States. Between 1923 and 1943, Yellow Coach built transit buses, electric-powered trolley buses, and parlor coaches.

Founded in Chicago in 1923 by John D. Hertz as a subsidiary of his Yellow Cab Company, the company was renamed "Yellow Truck and Coach Manufacturing Company" in 1925 when General Motors (GM) purchased a majority stake. After GM completely acquired the company in 1943, it was merged with GM's truck division to form the GM Truck & Coach Division.

The car rental subsidiary (known both as Hertz Drivurself Corp and Yellow Drive-It-Yourself) was purchased back by John Hertz in 1953 through The Omnibus Corporation and floated the following year as The Hertz Corporation.

== History ==
John D. Hertz and associates began acquiring smaller Chicago-area companies involved in bus-building in 1922, and soon assembled a manufacturing site covering four square blocks. Yellow Coach Manufacturing Co was formally established in 1923 as a subsidiary of Hertz's Yellow Cab Company, and sold 207 buses in its first year.

George J. Rackham, whose career had commenced with the London General Omnibus Company after the First World War, spent the years 1922–1926 in the U.S., and recognised the advantage of low swept chassis frame for bus development while employed by Yellow. It is likely that he was recruited by Hertz to help start up the bus building business. In 1926, he returned to England to join Leyland Motors as Chief Engineer and was responsible for the groundbreaking Titan and Tiger models.

General Motors purchased a controlling stake in the company in 1925 and changed the name to the Yellow Truck & Coach Manufacturing Company, and relocated production to Pontiac West Assembly in Pontiac, Michigan. Within the transit industry, the company continued to be called simply Yellow Coach.

In the 1930s, Yellow Coach produced best-selling models for the rapidly expanding urban transit and intercity bus businesses. (In 1935, national intercity bus ridership climbed 50% to 651,999,000 passengers, surpassing the volume of passengers carried by the Class I railroads for the first time. ) Yellow Coach played a significant role in the transition from electric streetcars (operating on rails, powered by overhead wires) to transit companys' use of gasoline- or diesel-powered buses operating on rubber wheels (changing from solid wheels to pneumatic tires). For Greyhound Lines, the largest operator of intercity bus service, Yellow Coach developed distinctive streamlined models which introduced a high floor, underfloor luggage storage, a flat front, air conditioning, and a diesel engine, supplying more than 1,250 buses during Greyhounds' years of fastest growth.

GM purchased the company outright in 1943, merging it into their GM Truck Division to form GM Truck & Coach Division. Although GM continued with the Yellow Coach T-series and P-series product lines, the Yellow Coach badge gave way to the GM Coach or just GM nameplate in 1944. Widespread production of Yellow Coach designs—including certain ZIS buses produced in the Soviet Union—continued until 1959. Limited production of the two remaining small-capacity "Old Look" models (3101/3102 and 3501/3502) would continue until 1969. GMC badges did not appear until 1968.

== Car rental - Hertz Drivurself Corp/Yellow Drive-It-Yourself ==
The company owned a subsidiary, known as either Hertz 'Drivurself Corp' or 'Yellow Drive-It-Yourself' which was sold with Yellow Coach to General Motors and eventually purchased back by Hertz in 1953 with The Omnibus Corporation which was then renamed The Hertz Corporation the following year.

== Models produced ==
=== Letter series (1923–1936) ===
Yellow started its model designation at the end of the alphabet and worked forward. Initially four types were offered:

- Z type single-deck bus or coach
- Z type double-deck bus
- Y type coach
- X type bus or coach.

All were conventional front-engine design vehicles powered by Yellow Knight I4 sleeve-valve gasoline engines, or a General Electric gas-electric hybrid unless noted otherwise. The Knight engine was connected to the rear wheels by a mechanical drive shaft. In gas-electric models, a gasoline engine in front supplied electric power to two large electric motors mounted on the rear axle.

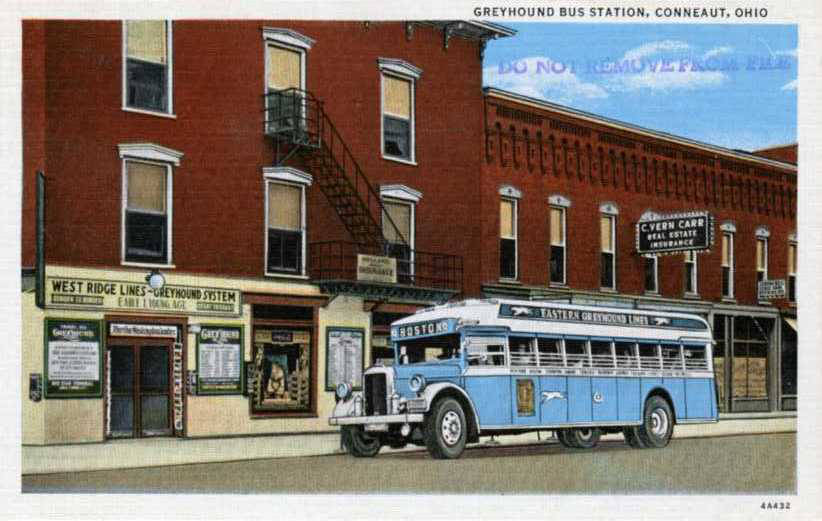
A postcard image (c. 1930) of a Yellow Coach Model Z-250 depicted in the livery of Eastern Greyhound Lines (similar photo)

Front view of a Yellow Coach Model Z-250

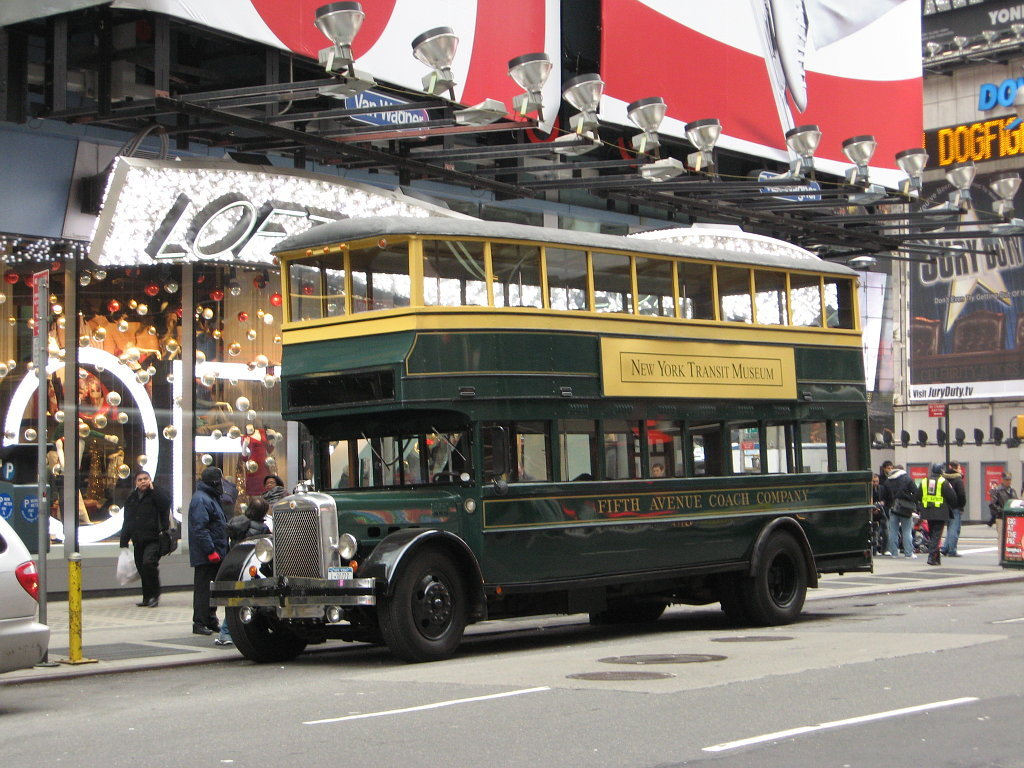
A restored Yellow Coach Model Z built for the Fifth Avenue Coach Co.

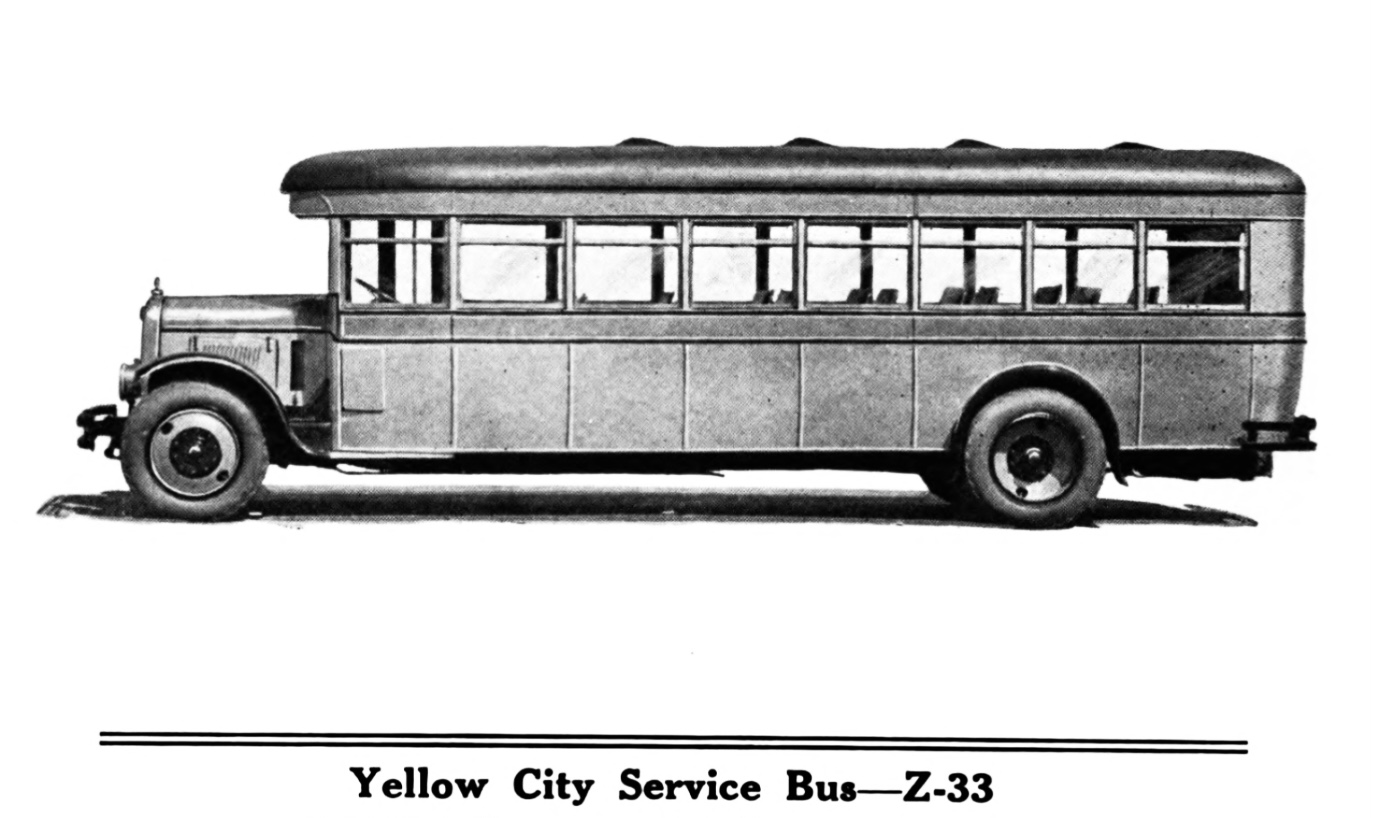
Yellow Z 33 (1925-1930)

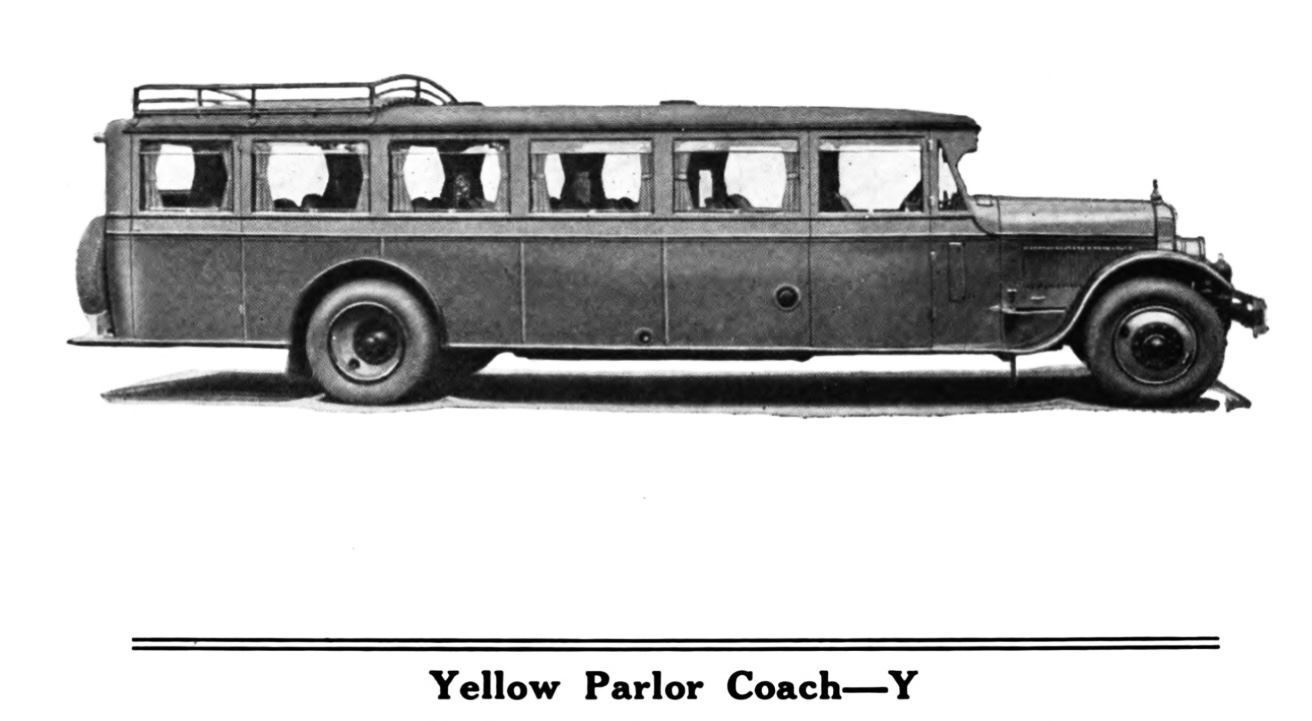
Yellow Y (1925-1930)

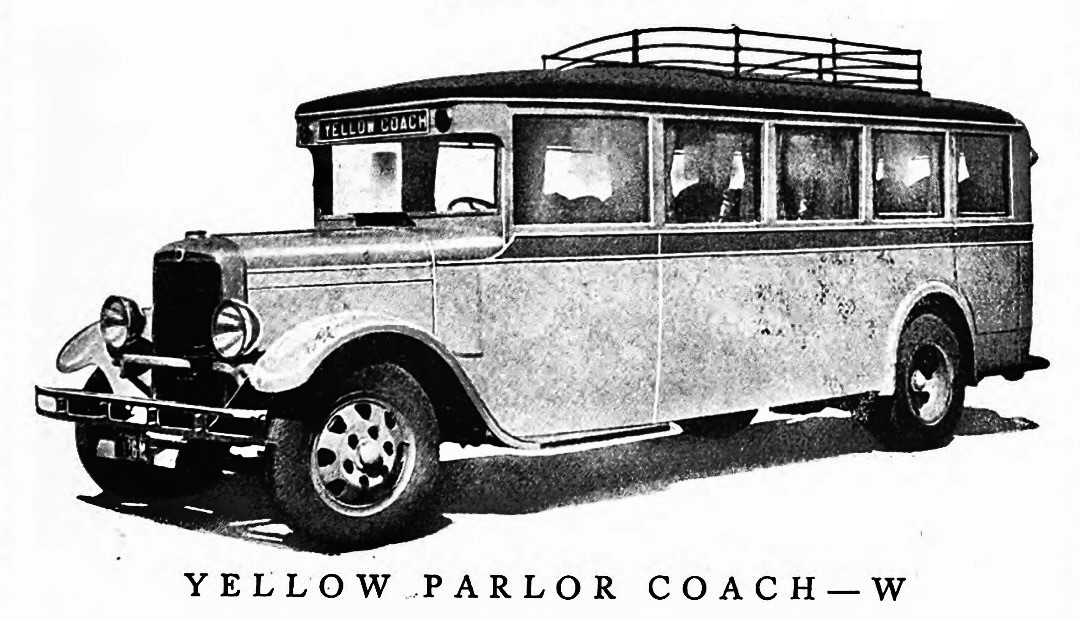
Yellow Model W (1928-1935)

Model	Seats	Engine	Type	Notes
Z-models (1923–1936)
Z-29	29		transit	(photo)
Z-63			transit	open-top double-decker
Z-66			transit	semi-enclosed double-decker (photo)
Z-67			transit	open-top double-decker (solid wheels) (photo)
Z-200/Z-230			transit	open-top double-decker (pneumatic tires) (photo)
Z-225			sightseeing coach	semi-enclosed with canvas weather roof
Z-230-W-8	33	gas-electric	transit	(photo)
Z-250	33		parlor coach	developed for Greyhound Lines (photo)
Z-240			transit	(photo) (photo)
Z-255	33		parlor coach	(photo)
Z-A-199			transit	3-axle front-entrance double-decker
Z-AAAM	63		transit	open-top double-decker
Z-AAD		gas-electric	suburban	
Z-AL-265		ASV	transit	"All Service Vehicle" (combination bus/trolleybus)
Z-AQ-273				
Z-BI-610	32		parlor coach	
Z-BP-620	38		transit	
Z-BR-602	62		transit	double-decker
Z-C-201	66		transit	double-decker
Z-CT-843				
Z-E-203			transit	open-top double-decker
ZBQ-621	69	gas-electric	transit	double-decker
Y-models (1924–1932)
Y-29	29		parlor coach	(photo)
Y-Z-227				
Y-Z-229				
Y-O-254				
Y-U-316				
X-models (1924–1928)
X-17	17		multi-row sedan	GM variant (photo)
X-21	17-21		parlor coach	(photo)
W-models (1928–1935)
W-21	18-21		transit or parlor coach	(photo)
V-models (1930–1936)
V-29	29		parlor coach	
V-225	29		transit or parlor coach	1931 (photo)
V-A-634			parlor coach	
VR-819			parlor coach	
U-models (1928–1935)
U-16	16		transit or parlor coach	
U-29	29		transit or parlor coach	
Model	Seats	Engine	Type	Notes

=== 700-series (1931–1939) ===
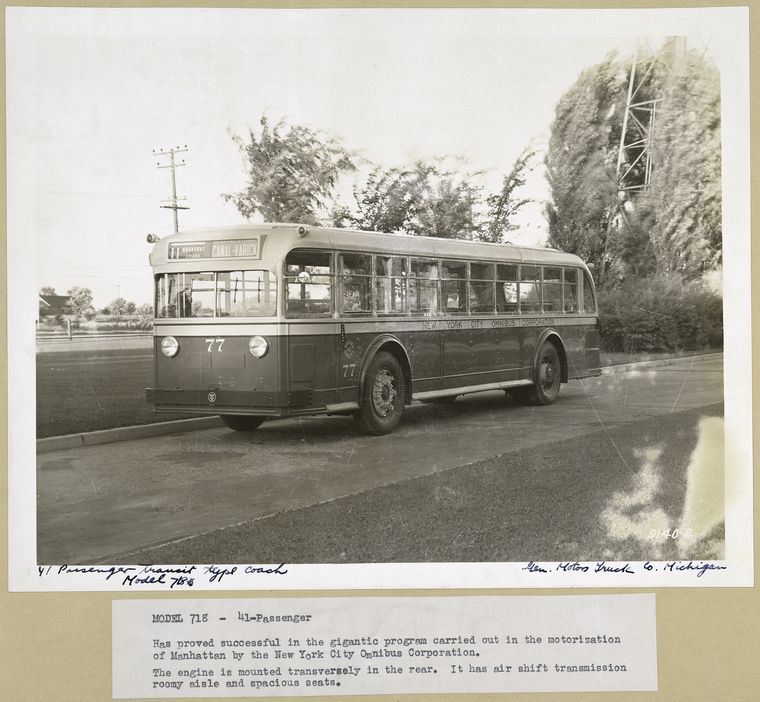
Model 718 (NYPL Collection))

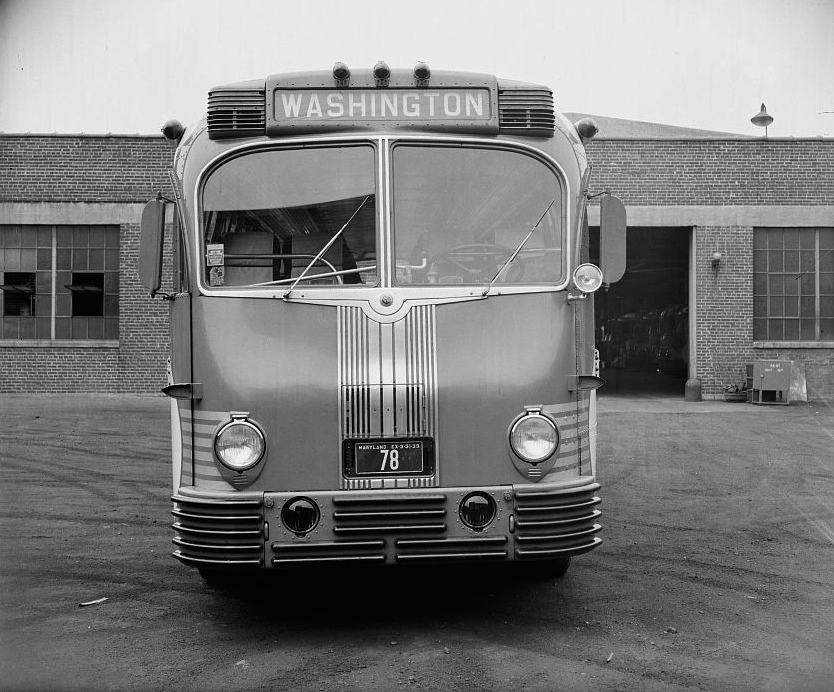
700-series Greyhound Super Coach (1938 photo) (side view)

In 1931, Yellow Coach introduced its 700 series buses, featuring one of the first bus designs to mount the engine in the rear. Mounting the engine in the rear represented a significant innovation, reducing mechanical losses, noise, and weight of a long drive shaft and exhaust running between a front engine and the rear drive and tailpipe. Bus manufacturers in Germany and the United Kingdom would not perfect rear-engine models until the 1950s. Customers did not always prefer rear-engined designs, noting that front engines were easier to access, and placed engine noise and vibration away from passengers and sometimes outside the coach body. Eventually, the 700 series included both front- and rear-engined models.

In 1934, Dwight Austin, patent-holder on an innovative rear-drive system, was hired by Yellow Coach and soon developed new models in the 700-series with transverse engines and a “V” angle drive. The V-drive and other innovations introduced in the 700 series would become long-lasting standards: air conditioning, diesel engines, a flat front, a high passenger floor (with luggage beneath), and unibody construction. The V-drive would be GM's standard configuration until the 1980s.

==== Best-selling transit buses: Models 718 and 728 ====
Notable 700-series versions include models 718 and 728 which were developed for use as urban transit. Model 718 sold 426 units to large transit operators in New York and Los Angeles, becoming the most popular transit bus of the early 1930s. Later model 728 sold 1,189 units to transit operators across 9 variants produced in the late 1930s. Both were exclusively rear-engined.

==== Greyhound (intercity) buses: Models 719 and 743 ====
For Greyhound Lines, an operator of intercity bus service, Yellow Coach developed model 719 in 1936 which introduced the high floor, underfloor luggage storage, a flat front and streamlined styling. In 1937, model 719 was revised to become model 743 and introduced air conditioning and a diesel engine. Models 719 and 743 were both branded as the Super Coach by Greyhound, and sales were effectively limited to Greyhound and its affiliates. Greyhound Lines purchased all 1,256 units of model 743 produced between 1937 and 1939.

==== 700 Series production details ====
All models are 96-inch (2.4 m) wide single-deck buses, except as noted.

Model	Built	Qty	Seats	Wheelbase	Engine	Mounted	Type	Notes
700	1932	5	40	213 in (5.4 m)	GM series 616 6 cyl. gas	rear	transit	built for Houston Electric Company
701	1931	12	44	213 in (5.4 m)	600 VDC	rear	trolley coach	built for Wisconsin Gas & Electric Co. (Kenosha, WI) (photo)
702	1931	0	40	213 in (5.4 m)	GM series 616 6 cyl. gas	rear	transit	experimental specifications; replaced by model 705
703	1931	1	44	213 in (5.4 m)	600 VDC	rear	transit	trolley coach demonstrator
704	1932	19	40	213 in (5.4 m)	GM series 616 6 cyl. gas	rear	transit	People's Motor Bus Co. (photo)
705	1932	24	40	213 in (5.4 m)	GM series 616 6 cyl. gas	rear	transit	replaced by model 708
706	1933	1	72	212 in (5.4 m)	GM series 616 6 cyl. gas	rear	transit	"Queen Mary" double-deck prototype; built for Chicago Motor Coach Company; replaced by model 720
707	1931–1934				GM series 707 6 cyl. gas			poppet valve engine; no other details
708	1933–1934	27	40	213 in (5.4 m)	GM series 616 6 cyl. gas	rear	transit	replaced by model 718
709	1933–1934	63	18	146 1/2 in (3.72 m)	GM series 257 6 cyl. gas	forward	transit	84 in (2.1 m) narrow body; replaced by model 714
710	1934	1	22	180 in (4.6 m)	GM series 331 6 cyl. gas	forward	transit	84 in (2.1 m) narrow body demonstrator; rebuilt into a model 713
711	1933–1934	131	30	178 5/8 in (4.54 m)	GM series 400 6 cyl. gas	rear	transit	104-inch (2.6 m) wide version also built; replaced by model 717
712	1933–1934	185	21	165 in (4.2 m)	GM series 257 6 cyl. gas	forward	transit	84 in (2.1 m) narrow body model; replaced by model 715
713	1934	2	24	175 in (4.4 m)	GM series 331 6 cyl. gas	forward	transit	84 in (2.1 m) narrow body demonstrators; replaced by model 716
714	1934	25	18	160 in (4.1 m)	GM series 257 6 cyl. gas	forward	transit	84 in (2.1 m) narrow body; revised model 711 with streamlining; replaced by model 733
715	1934	400	21	160 in (4.1 m)	GM series 257 6 cyl. gas	forward	transit	84 in (2.1 m) narrow body (photo) (interior photo); revised model 712 with streamlining; replaced by model 733
716	1934–1937	183	23	179 in (4.5 m)	GM series 331 6 cyl. gas	forward	transit	84 in (2.1 m) narrow body; revised model 713 with streamlining; replaced by model 739
717	1934–1936	122	30	178 5/8 in (4.54 m)	GM series 400 6 cyl. gas		transit	revised model 711 with streamlining; 104-inch (2.6 m) wide version offered but not built; replaced by model 728
718; Series 1	1934–1935	125	40	213 in (5.4 m)	GM series 616 6 cyl. gas	rear	transit	replaced model 708
718; Series 2	1935	50	40	213 in (5.4 m)	GM series 616 6 cyl. gas	rear	transit	built for New York City Omnibus Corporation (photo)
718; Series 3	1935–1936	221	40	213 in (5.4 m)	GM series 616 6 cyl. gas	rear	transit	revised rear end and other general improvements; built for New York City Omnibus Corp.
718; Series 4	none built	0						no details
718; Series 5	1936–1937	22	40	213 in (5.4 m)	GM series 616 6 cyl. gas	rear	transit	left side emergency door; built for Pacific Electric Railway Co.
718; Series 6	1936	6	40	213 in (5.4 m)	GM series 616 6 cyl. gas	rear	transit	44 in (110 cm) wide entrance, no center exit, left side emergency door; built for Pacific Electric Railway Co. and Los Angeles Railway Corp.; replaced by model 740
719; Ser. "EXP"	1934	3	37	243 in (6.2 m)	GM series 450 6 cyl. gas	rear	interurban	streamlined prototypes; built for Greyhound Lines
719	1935–1936	329	36	245 in (6.2 m)	GM series 707 6 cyl. gas	rear	interurban	streamlined; built for Greyhound; replaced by model 743
720; Series 1	1934	1	72	217 in (5.5 m)	GM series 707 6 cyl. gas	rear	transit	12 ft 10 1/2 in (3.9 m) low height double-decker; prototype; built for Chicago Motor Coach Company
720; Series 2	1936	100	72	217 in (5.5 m)	GM series 707 6 cyl. gas	rear	transit	built for Chicago Motor Coach Co.
720; Series 3	1936	25	72	217 in (5.5 m)	GM series 707 6 cyl. gas	rear	transit	built for Fifth Avenue Coach Co. New York)
720; Series 4	1938	40		217 in (5.5 m)	GM series 707 6 cyl. gas	rear	transit	new fuel tank and battery location to eliminate fire hazards; built for Chicago Motor Coach Co.
720; Series 5	1938	35	72	217 in (5.5 m)	GM series 707 6 cyl. gas	rear	transit	new fuel tank and battery location to eliminate fire hazards; built for Fifth Avenue Coach Co. New York
721	1934	4	30	178 5/8 in (4.54 m)	GM series 450 6 cyl. gas	rear	transit	104 in (2.6 m) wide body; replaced model 711; built for The Milwaukee Electric Railway and Light Company; replaced by model 1208
722	1934–1937	123	21	179 in (4.5 m)	GM series 400 6 cyl. gas	front	parlor	84 in (2.1 m) narrow streamlined body; replaced by model 738
723	1934	14	21	179 in (4.5 m)	GM series 331 6 cyl. gas	forward	parlor	84 in (2.1 m) narrow streamlined body; similar to model 722 except for drive train; replaced by model 738
724	1934	4	28	178 5/8 in (4.54 m)	GM series 400 6 cyl. gas	rear	parlor	streamlined; replaced model 717; replaced by model PG-29
725	1934	4	32	184 in (4.7 m)	GM series 450 6 cyl. gas	rear	transit	streamlined; Banker automatic transmission; total includes one experimental unit; replaced by model 728
726	none	0	41	232 1/2 in (5.91 m)	GM series 616 6 cyl. gas	rear	transit	streamlined; replaced model 718 incorporating model 725 type body construction
727	1934	10	36	214 5/8 in (5.45 m)	GM series 450 6 cyl. gas	rear	transit	streamlined; replaced model 725; total includes one experimental unit; replaced by model 721
728; Series 1	1935	100	32	184 in (4.7 m)	GM series 450 6 cyl. gas	rear	transit	replaced model 717; 24 built with straight frame, 76 built with bottle-neck frame
728; Series 2	1935	165	32	184 in (4.7 m)	GM series 450 6 cyl. gas	rear	transit	bottle-neck frame
728; Series 3	1935–1936	177	32	184 in (4.7 m)	GM series 450 6 cyl. gas	rear	transit	four different clutch and shift (air or manual) versions offered
728; Series 4	1936	150	32	184 in (4.7 m)	GM series 450 6 cyl. gas	rear	transit	18 built with flat floor, 132 built with floor ramped to rear
728; Series 5	1936	50	32	184 in (4.7 m)	GM series 450 6 cyl. gas	rear	transit	strengthened frame; all with ramped floor
728; Series 6	1936–1938	392	32	184 in (4.7 m)	GM series 450 6 cyl. gas	rear	transit	modified rear end for easier engine access; one rebuilt to series 6A prototype
728; Series 6A	1937–1938	92	32	184 in (4.7 m)	GM series 479 6 cyl. gas	rear	transit	same as series 6 except for engine
728; Series 6B	none	0	32	184 in (4.7 m)	GM series 479 6 cyl. gas	rear	transit	same as series 6A but with improved interior lighting
728; Series 7	1938–1939	31	32	184 in (4.7 m)	GM series 479 6 cyl. gas	rear	transit	rear end modified to accept either 479 or 529 engine; improved interior lighting; replaced by model TG-3201
729; Series 1	1935	61	36	213 7/8 in (5.43 m)	GM series 450 supercharged 6 cyl. gas-electric	rear	transit	"All Service Vehicle" or "All Purpose Coach" (photo); built for Public Service Coordinated Transport (Newark, NJ)
729; Series 2	1936	25	36	213 7/8 in (5.43 m)	GM series 450 supercharged 6 cyl. gas-electric	rear	transit	improved front and rear ends; built for Public Service Coordinated Transport
729; Series 3	1936	74	36	213 7/8 in (5.43 m)	GM series 450 supercharged 6 cyl. gas-electric	rear	transit	relocated electrical controller; built for Public Service Coordinated Transport
729; Series 4	1936	1	36	213 7/8 in (5.43 m)	Hercules 474 c.i.d. 4 cyl. oil-electric	rear	transit	similar to series 3 but with diesel-electric propulsion; built for Public Service Coordinated Transport
729; Series 5	1937	195	36	213 7/8 in (5.43 m)	GM series 450 supercharged 6 cyl. gas-electric	rear	transit	similar to series 3 but with improved chassis and drop-sash windows; built for Public Service Coordinated Transport
729; Series 6	1938	1	36	213 7/8 in (5.43 m)	GM series 529 supercharged 6 cyl. gas-electric	rear	transit	simplified version of series 5; built for Baltimore Transit Company
730	none	0	32	184 in (4.7 m)	GM series 450 6 cyl. gas	rear	transit	streamlined; intended to replace model 728; replaced by model 728 series 2
731; Series 1	1935	10	36	214 5/8 in (5.45 m)	GM series 450 6 cyl. gas	rear	transit	built for St. Louis Public Service Company
731; Series 2	1935	23	36	214 5/8 in (5.45 m)	GM series 450 6 cyl. gas	rear	transit	interchangeable frame for air or manual shift; 5 built with flat floor, 18 built with floor ramped to rear
731; Series 3	1936	50	36	214 5/8 in (5.45 m)	GM series 450 6 cyl. gas	rear	transit	strengthened frame; all with ramped floor
731; Series 4	1936	100	36	214 5/8 in (5.45 m)	GM series 450 6 cyl. gas	rear	transit	modified rear axle
732; Series 5	1936–1938	161	36	214 5/8 in (5.45 m)	GM series 450 6 cyl. gas	rear	transit	modified rear end for easier drive-train access
732; Series 5A	1937–1939	42	36	214 5/8 in (5.45 m)	GM series 529 6 cyl. gas	rear	transit	same as series 5 except for engine
732; Series 6	1937–1939	158	36	214 5/8 in (5.45 m)	GM series 529 6 cyl. gas	rear	transit	streamlined; improved interior lighting; replaced by model TG-3601
733						front	transit	(schematic drawing)
734						rear	suburban	
735						rear	transit	double-decker
736					diesel	rear		
738						rear	small parlor	
739						rear	small transit	
740						rear	transit	
741					gas-electric	rear	transit	"All Service Vehicle"
742	1937–1939	172	37			rear	suburban	replaced by model 1210
743	1937–1939	1,256	37		diesel	rear	parlor	"Super Coach" built exclusively for Greyhound Lines and affiliates
744			36			rear	transit	
745						rear	sleeper coach	
746					diesel-electric	rear	transit	"All Service Vehicle"
Model	Built	Qty	Seats	Wheelbase	Engine	Mounted	Type	Notes

=== 1200-series (1938–1940) ===
The Model 1200 series was launched in 1938 with the re-designation of Model 739 as Model 1203 for Public Service Corporation. The 6-model series name ended when three were given new P-series names, and another was given a T-series name.

Model	Seats	Type	Engine	Notes
1203		transit		Redesignated Model 139; Built for Public Service Corp. of New Jersey.
1204	24	transit	rear	produced 1938–1940; replaced by model TG-2401
1208	41	transit	trolleybus	40 units built in 1938 for The Milwaukee Electric Railway and Light Company; last YC trolleybuses
1209	25	parlor	rear	"Cruiserette"; replaced by model PG-2501
1210	37	parlor	rear	46 units produced in 1939; replaced by models PG-3701 and PD-3701
1213	29	parlor	rear	replaced model 724; replaced by model PG-2901 without change

By 1940, Model 1200 series designs were renamed into either the T- or P-series. The new model designations indicated type, fuel, propulsion (for transit) or customer (for parlor), seating capacity, and version number. (The first was -01, the second, -02, and so on.)

=== T-series (1940–1942) ===
All "T"-series models were urban transit buses. The model designation consisted of two or three letters followed by four numbers. These gave a basic description of the type of bus:

Type	Fuel	Transmission		Nominal seating capacity	Series
T = transit bus	D = diesel G = gasoline	= mechanical E = electric propulsion	-	21 = 24 = 23 feet 6 inches (7.16 m); 25 = 27 = 25 feet (7.62 m); 32 = 28 feet (8.53 m); 36 = 30 feet 6 inches (9.30 m); 40 = 33 feet (10.1 m); 45 = 35 feet (10.7 m); 54 = 41 feet 6 inches (12.6 m)	two digits

All models were rear-engined except the 21xx and 24xx series.

=== P-series (1939–1944) ===
The "P" indicated that, as parlor coaches, the P-series was primarily designed for the seated comfort of intercity bus passengers. All models are 96-inch (2.4 m) wide rear-engine parlor coaches.

Type	Fuel	Additional		Nominal seating capacity	Series
P = parlor coach	D = diesel G = gasoline	A = air conditioned G = Greyhound-only model	-	25 = 30 ft (9.1 m); 29 & 33 = 33 ft (10.1 m); 37 & 41 = 35 ft (10.7 m)	two digits

Model	Built	Quantity	Engine	Notes
PG-2501	1939–1940	8	GMC 248 6 cyl. gas	Replaced model 1209 (1st series) without change.
PG-2502	1939–1940	66	GMC 308 6 cyl. gas	Raised rear end with different fan, radiator arrangement and transmission than PG-2501.
PG-2503	1941	4	GMC 248 6 cyl. gas	Same as PG-2501 with-two rod transmission shift, improved frame, improved engine mounts, conventional clutch pedal and sealed beam headlights; also includes appearance changes as listed under PG-2505.
PG-2504	1940–1941	70	GMC 308 6 cyl. gas	Same as PG-2502 with two-rod transmission shift, improved frame, improved engine mounts, conventional clutch pedal and sealed beam headlights.
PG-2505	1941–1942	118	GMC 308 6 cyl. gas	Same as PG-2504 with improved interior appearance and numerous special items now incorporated as standard.
PG-2901	1939–1940	50	GMC 426 6 cyl. gas	"Cruiserette"; replaced model 1213 without change.
PD-2901	1939–1940	16	GMC 4-71 4 cyl. diesel	"Cruiserette"
PG-2902	1940–1941	56	GMC 426 6 cyl. gas	"Cruiserette"; same as PG-2901 with two-rod transmission shift, and sealed beam headlights, double-wrapped spring eyes and improved double-drag steering link.
PD-2902	1941–1942	249	GMC 4-71 4 cyl. diesel	"Cruiserette"; same as PD-2901 with improved interior appearance and numerous special items now incorporated as standard.
PG-2903	1941–1942	304	GMC 426 6 cyl. gas	"Cruiserette"; same as PG-2902 with improved interior appearance and numerous special items now incorporated as standard.
PD-3301	1942	115	GMC 4-71 4 cyl. diesel	Construction and appearance similar to PG-2900s.
PG-3301	1942–1943	49	GMC 477 6 cyl. gas	Construction and appearance similar to PG-2900s.
PD-3701	1940–1941	59	GMC 6-71 6 cyl. diesel	"Silversides"
PDG-3701	1940–1941	240	GMC 6-71 6 cyl. diesel	Greyhound version of the PD-3701.
PG-3701	1940–1941	70	GMC 707 6 cyl. gas	
PGG-3701	1940–1941	91	GMC 707 6 cyl. gas	Greyhound version of the PG-3701.
PDA-3701	1942–1943	185	GMC 4-71 4 cyl. diesel	Construction and appearance similar to PG-2900s.
PGA-3701	1942–1943	51	GMC 477 6 cyl. gas	Construction and appearance similar to PG-2900s.
PDG-4101	1940–1941	224	GMC 6-71 6 cyl. diesel	1940 Greyhound specifications.
PGG-4101	1940–1941	35	GMC 707 6 cyl. gas	1940 Greyhound specifications.

=== GM and GMC ===
In 1944, General Motors completed its acquisition and merger of Yellow Coach. The T-Series and P-Series production and series numbering continued under the GM and GMC bus brands, along with other variants such as B-Series school buses and S-Series suburban buses. Yellow Coach designs would continue to be widely produced until 1959, when GM introduced its New Look models. The last Yellow Coach design ceased production in 1969.

== See also ==
- GM Truck & Coach Division
- GM "old-look" transit bus
- General Motors streetcar conspiracy

== Bibliography ==
- Luke, William A. (2001). Yellow Coach Buses - 1923–1943 Photo Archive, Hudson, WI: Iconografix. ISBN 1-58388-054-2
- Luke, William A. & Metler, Linda L. (2004). Highway Buses of the 20th Century, Hudson, WI: Iconografix. ISBN 1-58388-121-2
- Luke, William A. & Metler, Linda L. (2005). City Transit Buses of the 20th Century, Hudson, WI: Iconografix. ISBN 1-58388-146-8
- McKane, John H. & Squier, Gerald L. (2006). Welcome Aboard the GM New Look Bus, Hudson, WI: Iconografix. ISBN 1-58388-167-0
- Plachno, Larry (2002). Greyhound Buses Through the Years - Part I , Polo, Il: National Bus Trader Magazine, November, 2002
- Stauss, Ed (1988). The Bus World Encyclopedia of Buses, Woodland Hills, CA: Stauss Publications. ISBN 0-9619830-0-0
