= Chicago Transit Authority =

Transit agency in Chicago, Illinois

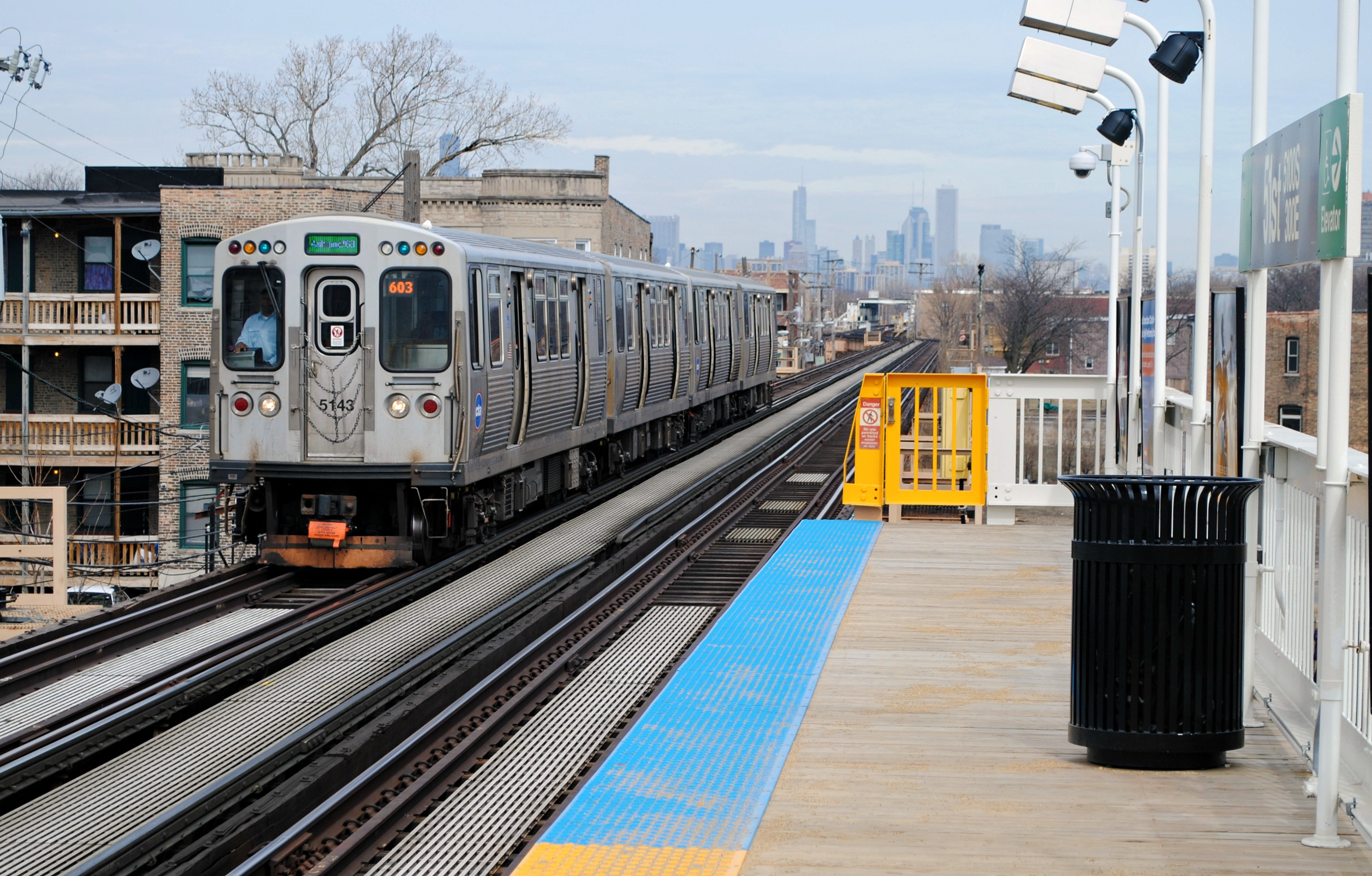
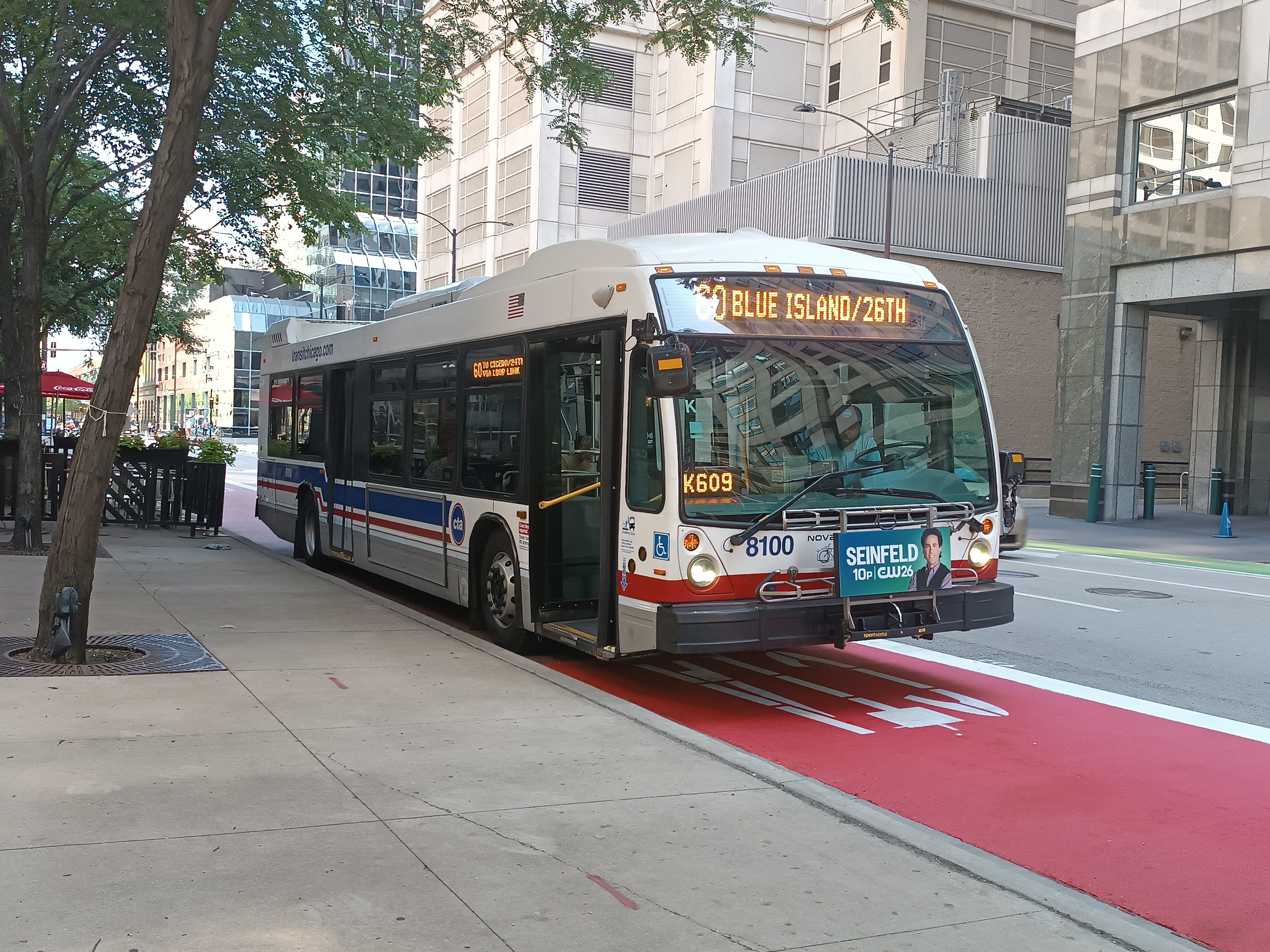
- CTA services: "L" and bus
- Parent: Northern Illinois Transit Authority
- Founded: October 1, 1947; 79 years ago
- Headquarters: 567 West Lake Street, Chicago, Illinois
- Locale: Chicago, Illinois & suburbs
- Service type: Bus service Rapid transit
- Routes: Bus: 140, Rail: 8
- Fleet: Bus: 1,879, Rail: 1,190
- Daily ridership: 1,101,600 (total, weekdays, Q2 2026)
- Annual ridership: 319,160,900 (total, 2025)
- Fuel type: Diesel, Diesel-electric hybrid, Battery electric
- Chief executive: Nora Leerhsen
- Website: transitchicago.com

The Chicago Transit Authority (CTA) is a public transit agency in Chicago, Illinois, United States and one of the three service boards of the Northern Illinois Transit Authority (NITA). It operates the Chicago "L" rapid transit system and CTA bus services.

The CTA was established as an independent governmental agency by the Metropolitan Transportation Act passed by the Illinois General Assembly on April 12, 1945. It started operations on October 1, 1947, upon the purchase and combination of the transportation assets of the Chicago Rapid Transit Company and the Chicago Surface Lines streetcar system. In 1952, CTA purchased the assets of the Chicago Motor Coach Company, resulting in a fully unified system. As of 2026, the CTA is one of the three service boards overseen by the Northern Illinois Transit Authority (NITA), along with Metra commuter rail and Pace Suburban Bus.

In 2025, the system had a ridership of 319,160,900, or about 1,101,600 per weekday as of the second quarter of 2026.

== History ==
The CTA was formed through the Metropolitan Transportation Act passed by the Illinois General Assembly on April 12, 1945. It started operations on October 1, 1947, upon the purchase and combination of the transportation assets of the Chicago Rapid Transit Company and the Chicago Surface Lines streetcar system. Over the next few years CTA modernized the "L", replacing wooden cars with new steel ones and closing lightly used branch lines and stations, many of which had been spaced only a quarter-mile apart.

In 1952, CTA purchased the assets of the Chicago Motor Coach Company, which was under the control of Yellow Cab Company founder John D. Hertz, resulting in a fully unified system. By 1960, the CTA replaced all of its streetcars with buses. The CTA system for decades also included a large number of trolley bus routes, and in the 1950s had one of the largest such networks in the country, but trolley bus service was phased out between the late 1960s and 1973.

On March 20, 2026, CTA sued the Trump administration for freezing $3.1 billion in rapid transit rail project funding. The funding was previously approved for upgrading and expansion of the Chicago "L"

On September 1, 2026, CTA's parent agency, the former Regional Transportation Authority (RTA), was replaced by the new Northern Illinois Transit Authority (NITA).

== Services ==
The Chicago Transit Authority provides service in Chicago and surrounding suburbs of Forest Park, Evanston, Skokie, Oak Park, Summit, Cicero, Berwyn, North Riverside, Rosemont, Evergreen Park, Oak Lawn, Park Ridge, Harwood Heights, Norridge, Lincolnwood, and Wilmette. The CTA operates 24 hours each day and on an average weekday provides over 950,000 rides on buses and trains.

=== Chicago "L" ===
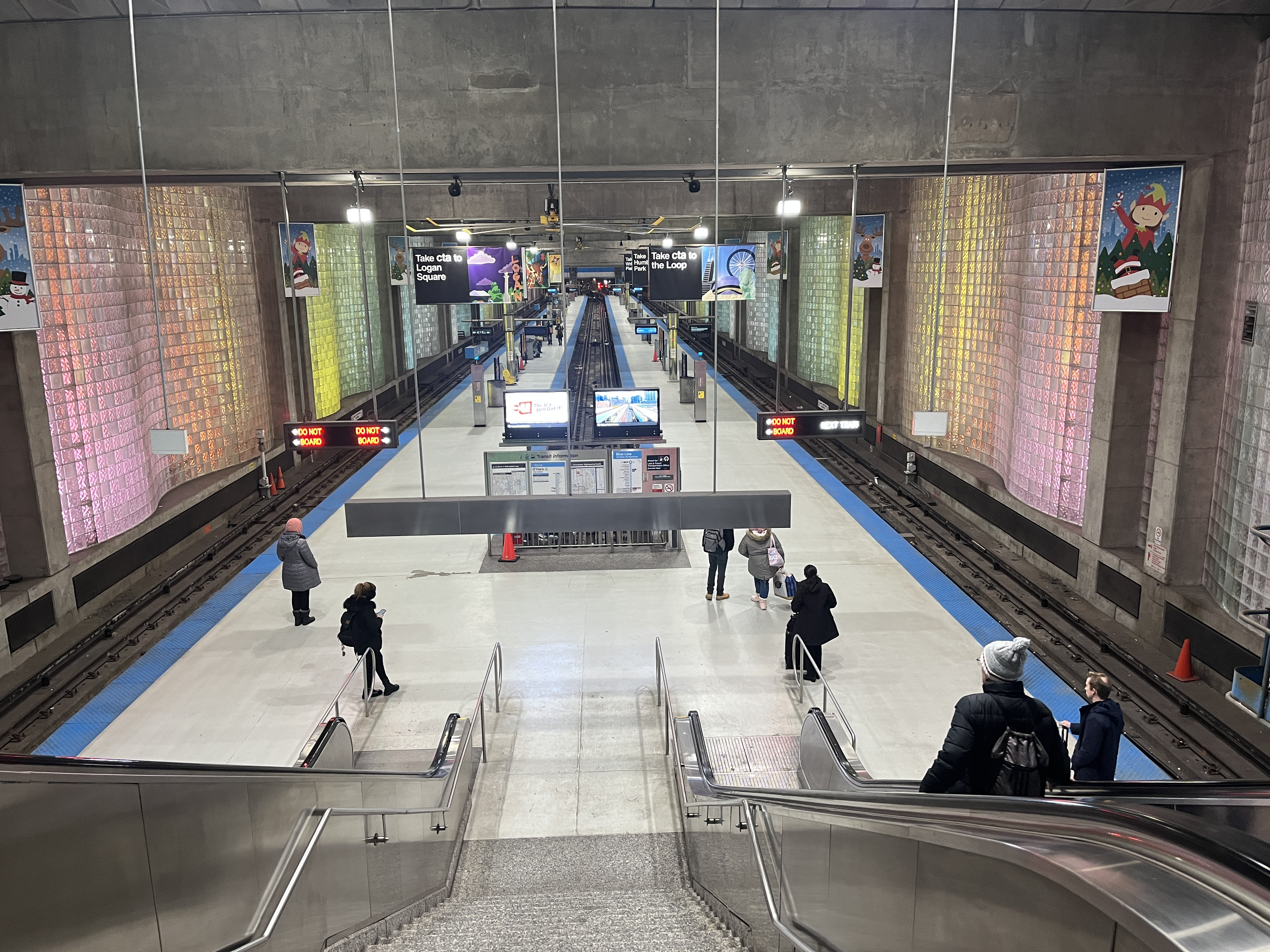
Blue Line terminal at O'Hare International Airport

The Chicago "L" is the rapid transit system serving the city. It is the third-busiest rapid transit system in the United States. As of January 2025, the "L" has a fleet of 1,560 train cars serving over eight routes and 226 miles (364 km) of track. Its trains provide an average of 471,547 customer trips each weekday and serve 146 stations in Chicago and seven suburbs. The majority of train stations CTA operates have elevators or ramps to provide access for customers with disabilities. All trains are accessible, either through fully level boarding or a ramp to bridge the 3-4in height gap.

==== Rolling stock ====
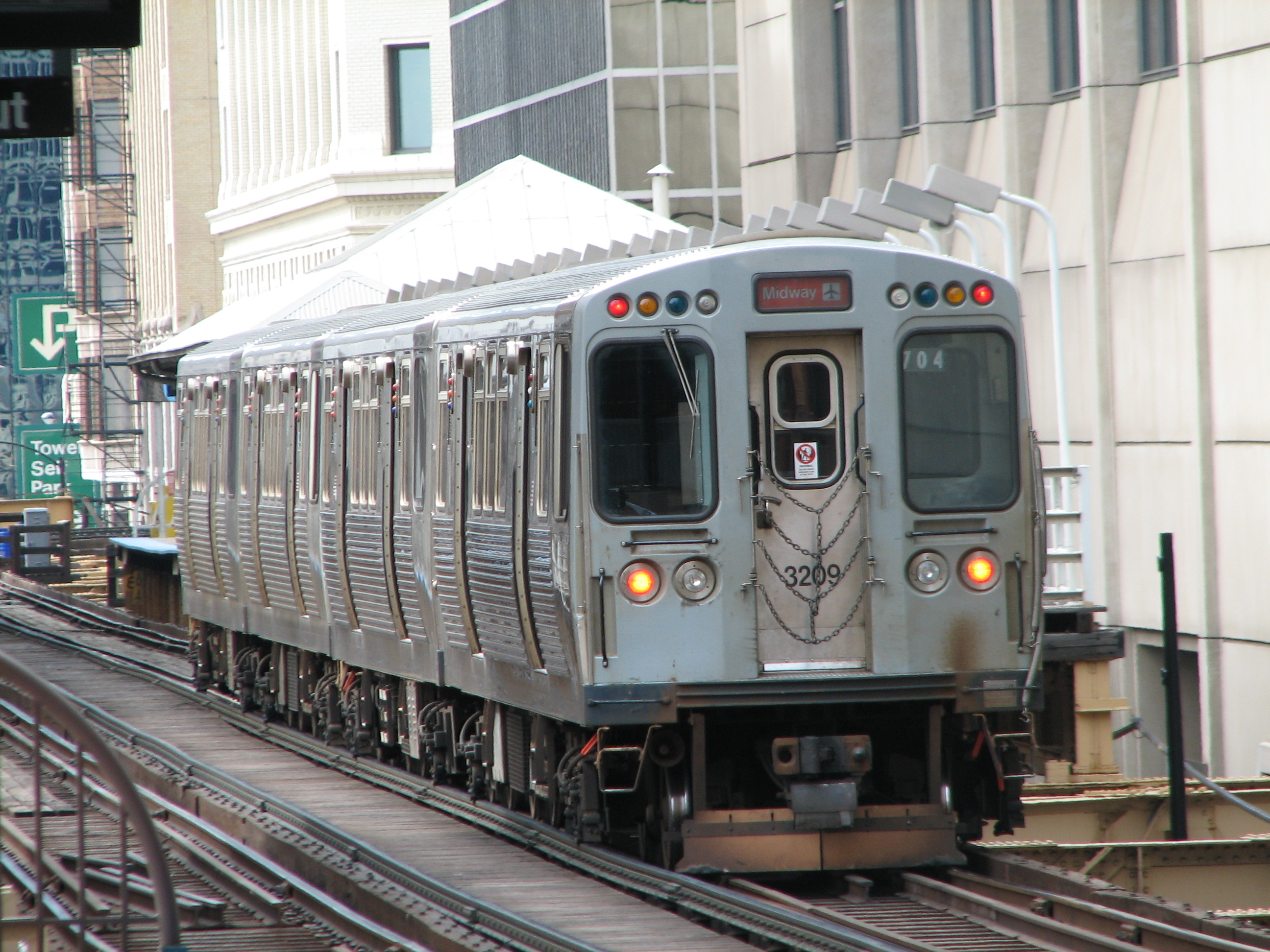
An Orange Line train of 3200-series cars pulls into State/Lake

The rolling stock of the CTA consists of four series of electric multiple unit rail cars that includes the last rail cars built by the Budd Company and rail cars built by Morrison-Knudsen, Bombardier, and CRRC. Manufacturers of former rolling stock include Boeing-Vertol, Pullman Car Company, St. Louis Car Company, and Cincinnati Car Company.

The 5000-series was built by Bombardier from 2009 to 2015. Ten (10) prototypes of the 5000-series were received in 2009, and entered passenger testing in April 2010, with 396 more ordered once tests were completed. On July 20, 2011, CTA announced the order of 300 more rail cars, bringing the total ordered to 706 at a cost of about US$1 billion. The more recent 7000-series is being built by CRRC Sifang America, with delivery of production cars beginning in 2022.

=== Bus ===
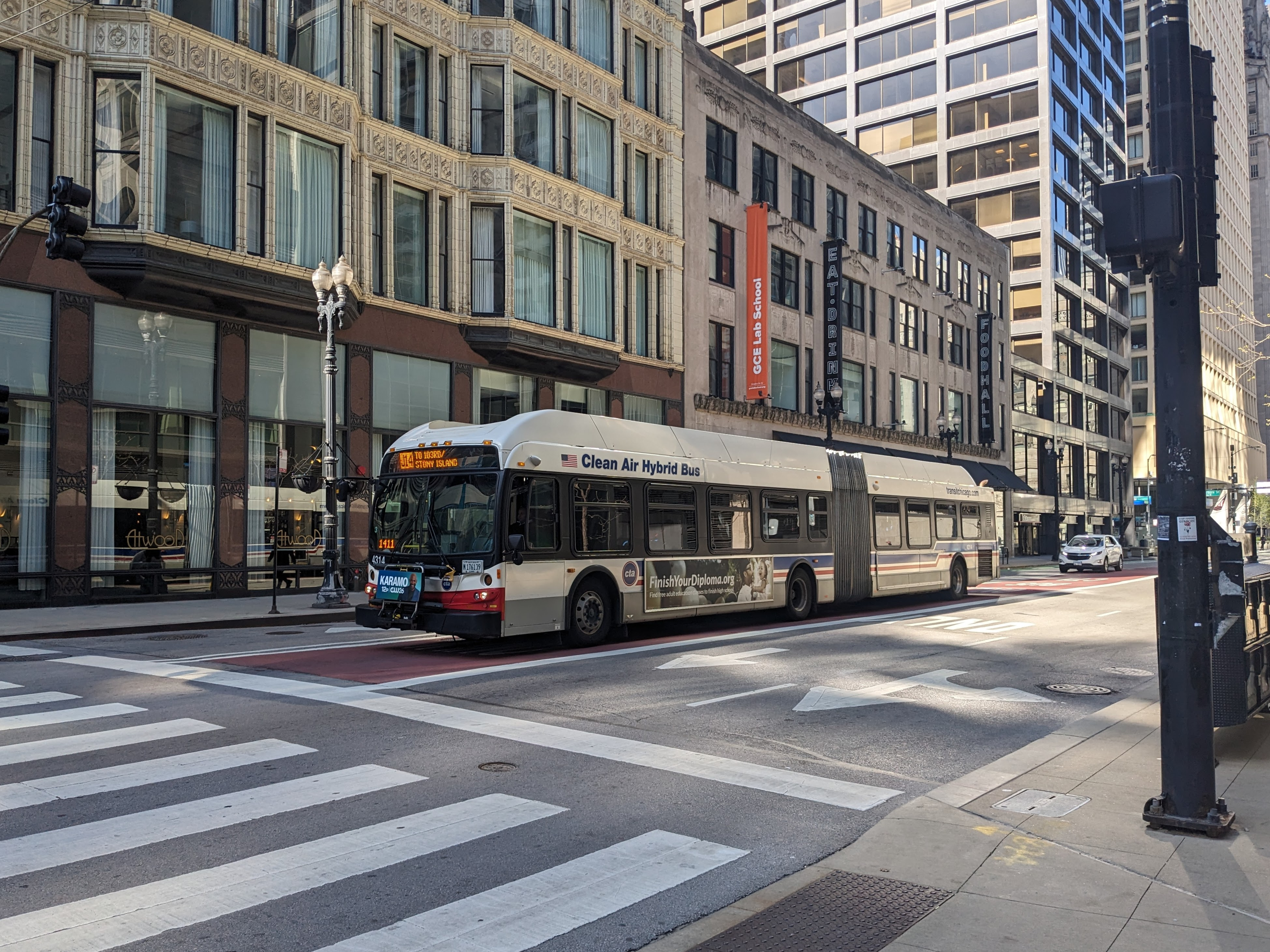
CTA New Flyer DE60LFR bus in The Loop, 2024

The CTA is the primary operator of buses in the Chicago area. As of January 2025, it has approximately 2,000 buses that operate over 127 routes traveling along 1,516 miles (2,440 km). Buses provide about 638,212 passenger trips each weekday and serve more than 10,000 posted bus stops.

As of December 2025, CTA's fleet of buses is mostly dominated by Nova Bus Nova Bus LFS. Formerly, New Flyer's D40LF dominated the fleet which replaced buses that were built in 1991 and 1995. In 2014, CTA ordered 400 new buses from Nova. The number increased to 425 after it exercised an option. The CTA exercised another option for an additional twenty-five buses, from Nova Bus. Nova Bus delivered an additional 600 new buses which replaced the remainder of the older Nova buses that were delivered between 2000 and 2002, in addition to starting the retirement of New Flyer D40LF buses delivered between 2006 and 2009.

In 2014, the CTA received their first electric buses from New Flyer, making the CTA the first major U.S. transit agency to use the new wave of electric buses as part of a regular service.

As mandated by the Americans with Disabilities Act of 1990 for all transit operators in the U.S., all CTA buses are accessible, with a ramp on every bus available for use.

== Governance ==
The governing body of the CTA is the Chicago Transit Board, consisting of seven members. Four members are appointed by the mayor of Chicago, while the other three are appointed by the governor of Illinois. Each appointment requires approval from the other party. Board members serve seven-year terms, staggered to reduce sudden shifts in policy. The board chooses a General Manager to oversee day-to-day operations; the position was renamed executive director in 1976 and has been known as president since March 1992.

The Chicago Transit Board is advised by the ADA Advisory Committee and Citizens Advisory Board, which are composed of Chicago-area residents chosen by the board.

=== Security and safety ===
After the September 11 attacks, CTA announced its "If you See Something, Say Something" campaign. CTA has also installed a security camera network, and a system to send real time images from cameras in buses directly to emergency responders.

CTA has also been actively prosecuting vandals, announcing on several occasions that felony convictions were obtained against persons who spray painted authority vehicles.

== Fares ==
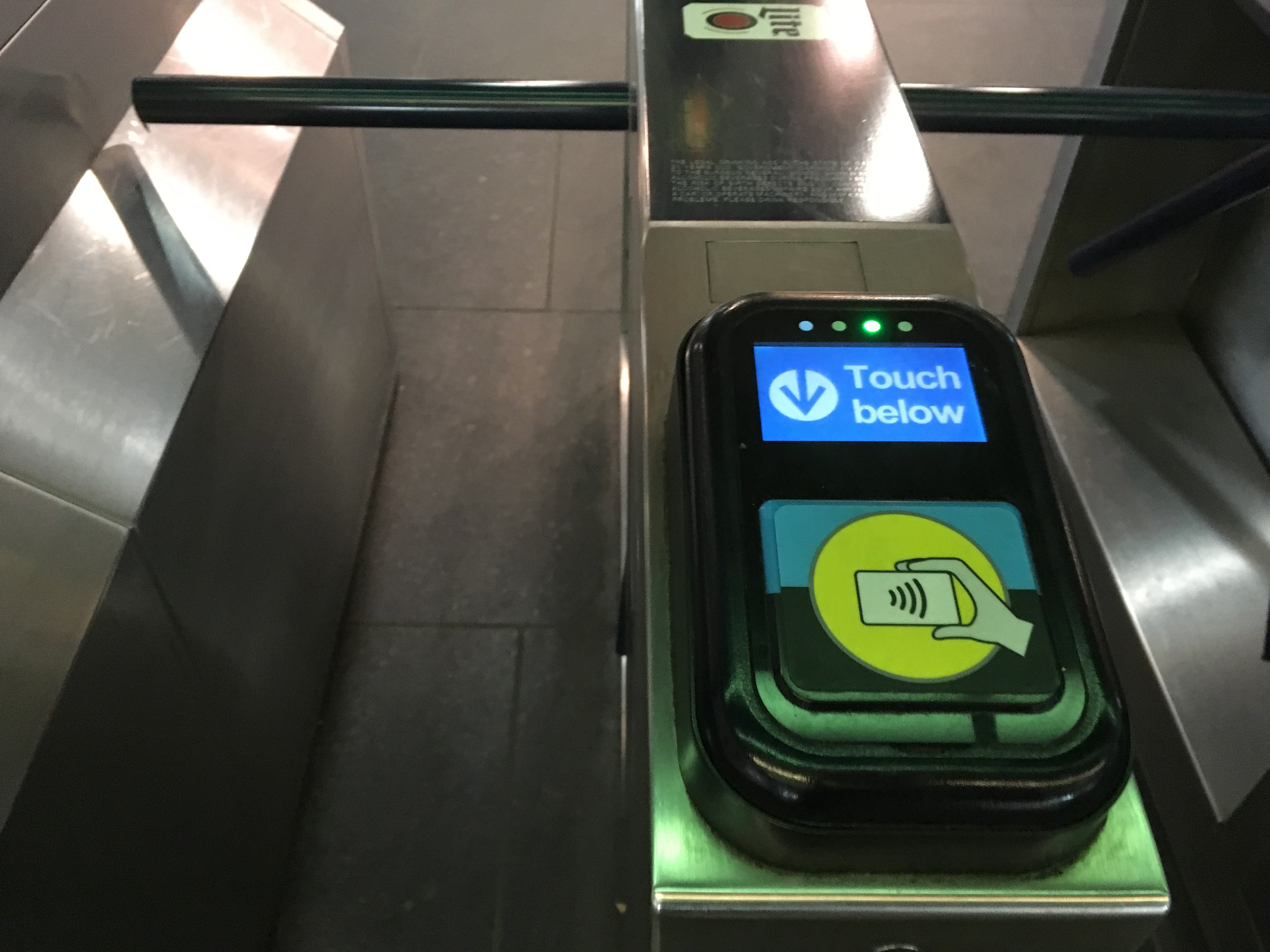
Ventra card reader on an "L" turnstile

The CTA uses a flat rate fare system. The full fare is $2.25 for bus, $2.50 for rail (except for fares purchased at the Blue Line O'Hare station, which are $5). Students, people with disabilities, and senior citizens are eligible for discounted fares. In 2026, CTA planned to raise fares by $0.25, but the fare hike was rescinded before it went into effect.

The CTA accepts payment with a Ventra smart card, a Ventra disposable ticket, contactless credit or debit card, and mobile payment. Monthly, weekly, and daily passes are available for Ventra cards/tickets. Ventra is an electronic fare payment system for the Chicago Transit Authority and Pace that replaced the Chicago Card and the Transit Card automated fare collection system. Ventra launched in August 2013, with a full system transition slated for July 1, 2014. The Ventra payment system allows for two free transfers within two hours from the start of a trip. CTA buses also accept cash.

== Programs ==
=== Bus tracker ===
The CTA installed GPS Bus Tracker systems on all buses starting with the 20 (Madison St) bus in 2006, before expanding it to other routes in 2008. The original claim justifying the addition of this technology was that it would reduce the issue of bunching buses. The system also allows riders to be able to determine the location of buses online.

A report prepared by the CTA claims that there was a decrease in bus bunching from 3.9% to 2.3% from 2007 to 2009, but the report neither demonstrated a direct connection between Bus Tracker and this reduction in bunching, nor did it show whether this was a temporary or permanent phenomenon.

CTA has also made its Bus Tracker and other developer tools available, and is making Bus Tracker arrival data available through text messaging. One of the first applications of the Bus Tracker Developer Tools involved the installation of monitors showing the information in several businesses in Chicago's Wicker Park neighborhood. Using the developer API published by CTA, some augmented CTA bus tracking applications have been developed for mobile phones, and CTA has its own Transit App, CTA also has a bus tracker (Beta starting January 2011), and it can also be accessed through a computer, smart phone, text messaging, or any smart device.

=== Special events ===
==== Holiday Train ====
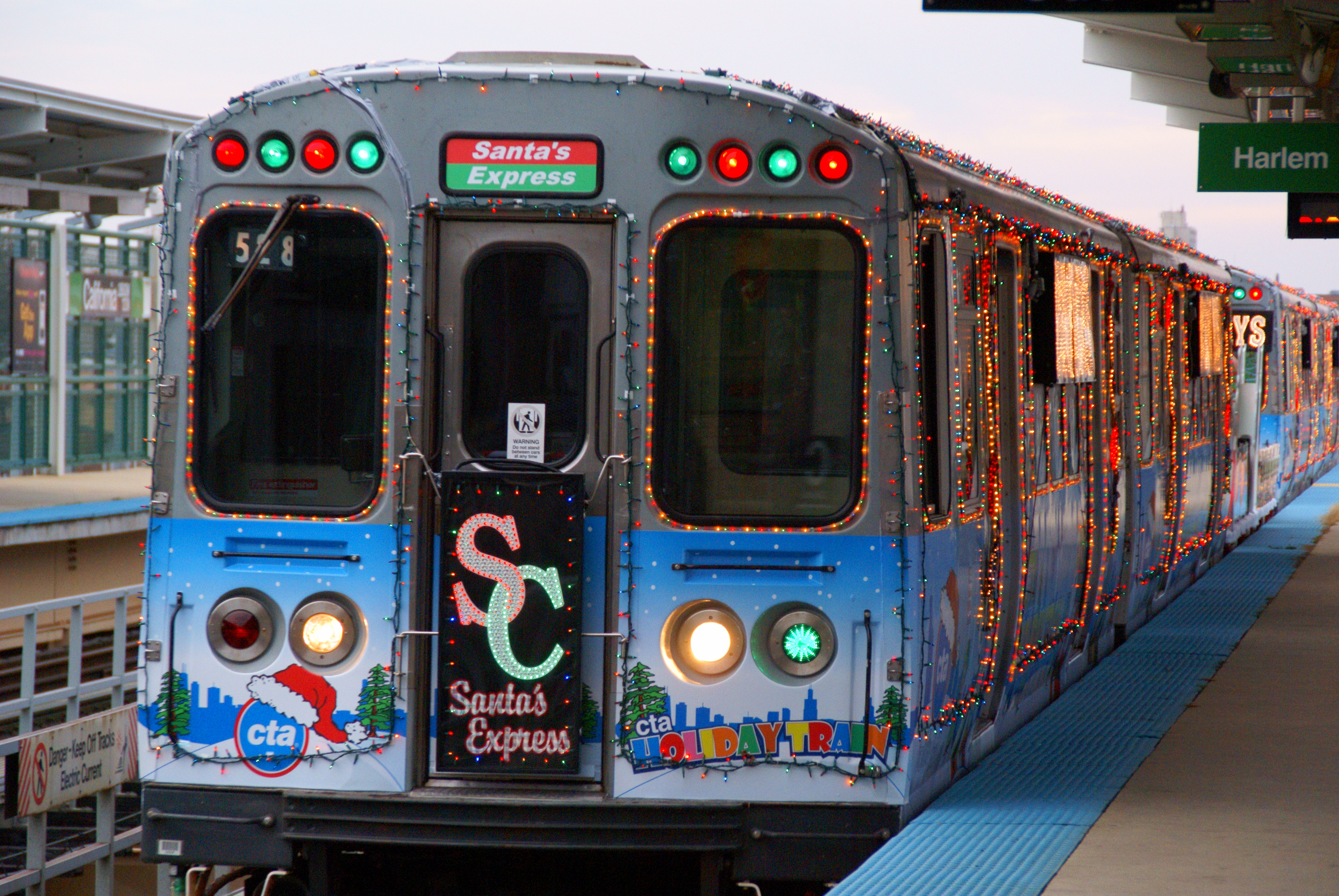
Holiday Train at California station in 2011

During the months of November and December, the CTA decorates several "L" rail cars in seasonal decorations and lights, which run alongside an open-air flatcar transformed into Santa's sleigh as the CTA Holiday Train.

==== Heritage fleet ====
The CTA maintains a small fleet of former rolling stock and buses for use during special events and for private charters. These include 4000-series rail cars, 6000-series rail cars, 2400-series rail cars, and buses built by GMC and Flxible.

==== Pride Train ====
Since 2017, the CTA has run a specially-wrapped train during Pride Month, making it the first transit agency in the United States to do so.

=== Public art ===
The CTA is home to a collection of art – including mosaics, sculptures and paintings. More than 50 pieces of art are exhibited at over 40 CTA stations.

According to the CTA, the original pieces of artwork contribute to each station's identity and enhance travel for customers. Many of the pieces are a result of the Arts in Transit Program, which is funded by the Federal Transit Administration and coordinated locally through the City of Chicago's Office of Tourism and Culture. A number of other pieces were created through the CTA's Adopt-A-Station program and through partnerships with organizations such as the Chicago Public Art Group.

==== Arts in Transit ====
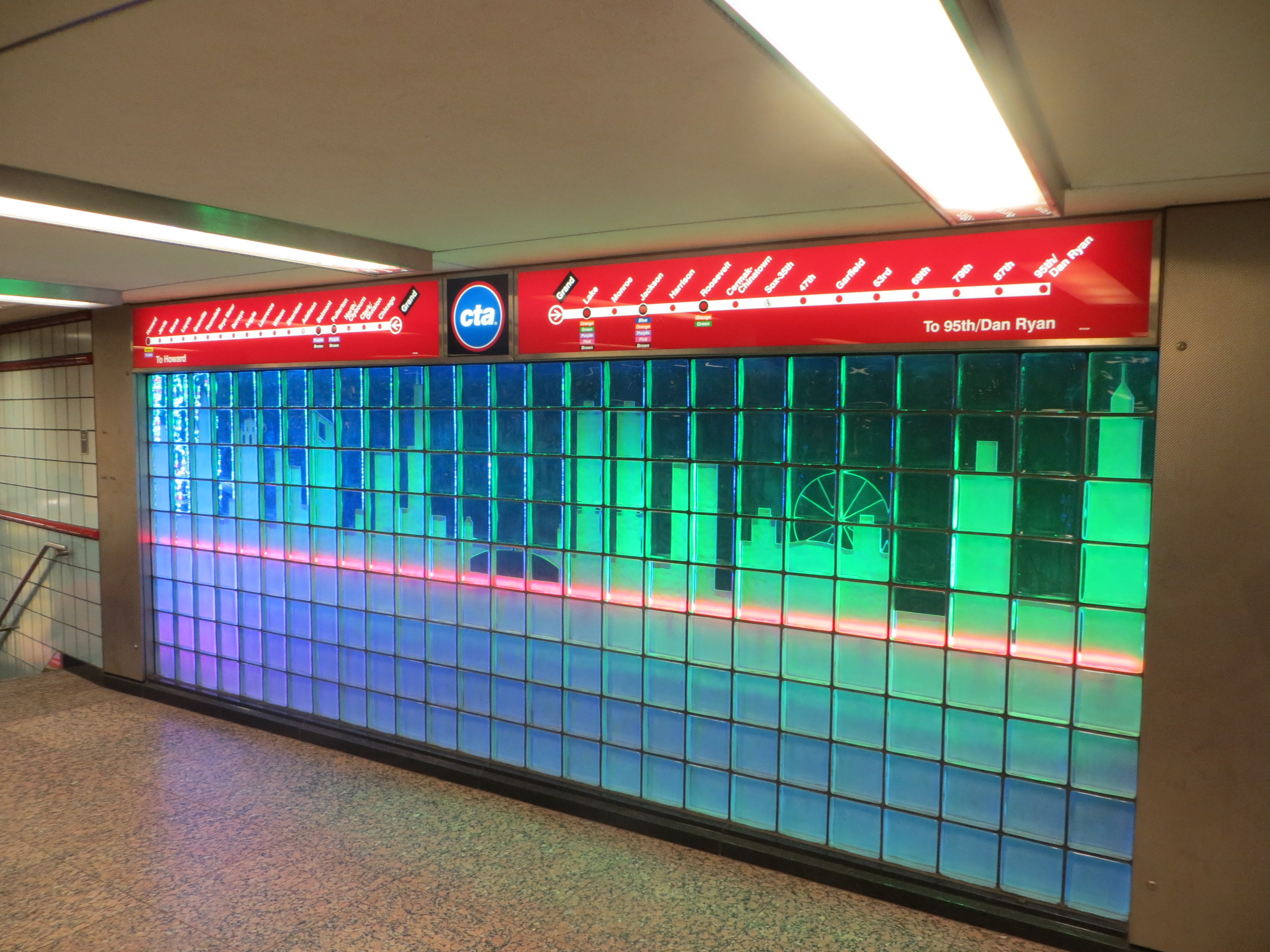
Art installation at Grand station on the Red Line

In 2004, the CTA and the City of Chicago Public Art Program installed nine permanent works of art at eight renovated rail stations on what is now known as the Pink Line. The CTA has since created an ongoing program to showcase permanent works of art in conjunction with the City of Chicago Public Art Program. The Arts in Transit Program is funded by the Federal Transit Administration, and created opportunities to develop original artwork for station reconstruction projects along the CTA Red and Brown Lines. Artists were selected for each of the stations included in the Brown Line Capacity Expansion Project and select renovated Red Line stations.

With the completion of the Brown Line Capacity Expansion Project in December 2009, original artwork was installed in each of the 18 renovated stations along the CTA's Brown Line. By combining the visibility and accessibility of the city's mass transit system with the creativity of Chicago's art resources, this program resulted in a successful public display of professional works of art designed with input from nearby communities. This program provided high-profile locations for public art and server as a gateway to communities served by the CTA stations. Media under consideration included, but were not limited to, mosaics, art glass, ornamental fencing, mixed-media artwork, and freestanding sculpture and furniture.

The CTA and the City of Chicago Public Art Program, administered by the Office of Tourism and Culture, encouraged and facilitated collaborations between artists, government agencies, the community and other partners. The City of Chicago Public Art Program accepted qualifications from local and national professional artists or artist teams capable of creating permanent public works of art for the CTA Arts in Transit Program for the renovated stations.

==== 2023 MCA installation ====
In 2023, as part of an exhibition titled "Forecast Form: Art during the Caribbean Diaspora, 1990s-Today" by the Museum of Contemporary Art Chicago, the CTA temporarily installed 20 copies of Felix Gonzalez-Torres' Untitled (1995) at "L" stops across Chicago.

=== TV show ===
The Chicago Transit Authority produced a monthly television show, Connections, from May 2003 until March 2011. The show, hosted by Braydens Connections, was broadcast on City of Chicago Public-access television cable TV channels 23 & 49, as well as on Comcast's CN100 in the Chicago metropolitan area, including areas of Michigan and Indiana.

Connections featured news and information about the CTA and services it provides. Individual segments from Connections are available on CTA's YouTube channel.

== Ridership ==
In 2024, the CTA served 309 million trips across all of its routes.

== See also ==
- List of Chicago "L" stations
- List of former Chicago "L" stations
- Transportation in Chicago
