= GM TDH-4801 & TDM-4801 =

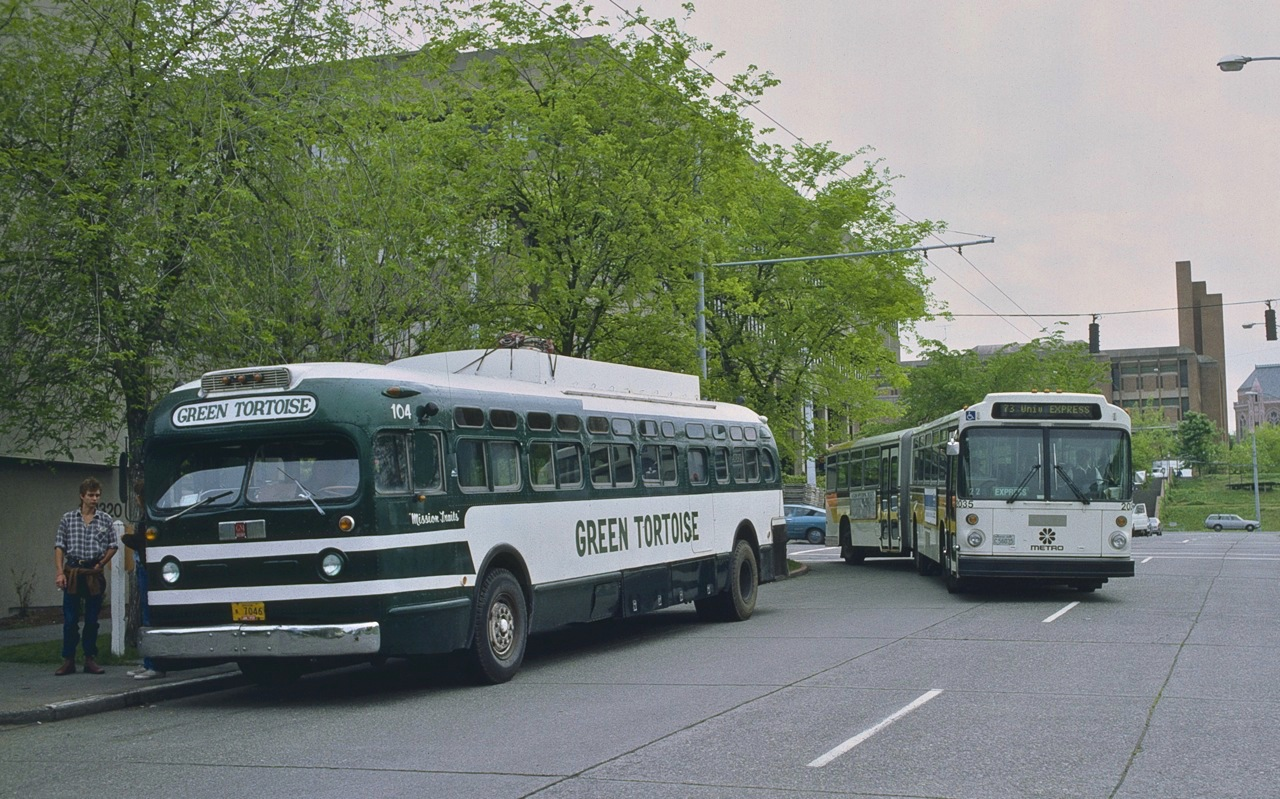
- A TDM-4801 (left) in Seattle in 1984

Overview
- Manufacturer: General Motors Diesel Division
- Production: 1953–1958

Body and chassis
- Doors: 2
- Floor type: Step entrance
- Chassis: Integral

Dimensions
- Length: 37 ft 9 in (11.5 m)
- Width: 102 in (2.6 m)

The GM TDH-4801 and TDM-4801 were a special series of GM "old-look" transit buses that were produced between 1953 and 1958 and which were designed to maintain a maximum rear axle weight load of no more than 16,500 pounds (7.5 t). The reason for this was due to a requirement in California at the time that buses more than 35 feet (11 m) in length or 96 inches (2.4 m) in width could only be operated under special authorization from the California Public Utilities Commission (CPUC), and the CPUC had denied authorization for the TDH-5105 (a 40-foot-long (12 m), 102-inch-wide (2.6 m) bus) partially due to its weight. Both the TDH-4801 and TDM-4801 have an unusual vehicle length of 37 feet 9 inches (11.5 m) (rather than the normal 35 or 40 feet) and a seating capacity of only 48 (rather than 51 for a comparable 40-foot bus). Both models are 102 inches wide. The TDH-4801 was equipped with an automatic transmission and 547 were built between 1953 and 1958. The TDM-4801 was equipped with a manual transmission and 75 were built in 1954.

== See also ==
- GM "old-look" transit bus
