= GM "old-look" transit bus =

GM bus manufactured from 1940 to 1969

GM "Old Look" Bus
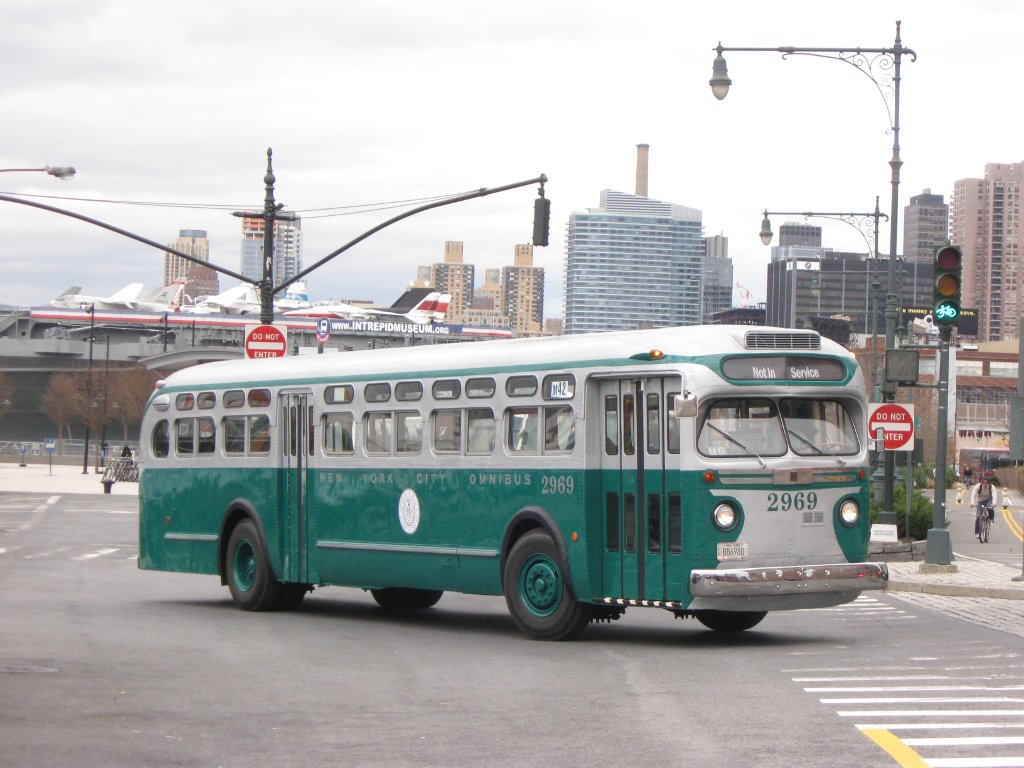
- A GM "old look" TDH-5105 bus in New York

Overview
- Manufacturer: Yellow Coach (1940–1943); GMC Truck and Bus (1944–1969)
- Production: 1940–1969
- Assembly: Pontiac West Assembly, Pontiac, Michigan

Body and chassis
- Class: Transit bus
- Body style: Monocoque stressed skin

Powertrain
- Engine: Detroit Diesel 4-71 or 6-71
- Transmission: Hydraulic or Manual

Dimensions
- Length: 25 ft (7.6 m), 28 ft (8.5 m), 30 ft (9.1 m), 33 ft (10 m), 35 ft (11 m), 37.75 ft (11.51 m), 40 ft (12 m), or 41.5 ft (12.6 m)
- Width: 96 in (2.44 m) or 102 in (2.59 m)
- Height: 113 in (2.87 m) (roofline)

Chronology
- Successor: GM New Look

The GM "old-look" transit bus was a transit bus that was introduced in 1940 by Yellow Coach beginning with the production of the model TG-3201 bus. Yellow Coach was an early bus builder that was partially owned by General Motors (GM) before being purchased outright in 1943 and folded into the GM Truck Division to form the GM Truck & Coach Division. The Yellow Coach badge gave way to the GM nameplate in 1944. Production of most "old-look" models was stopped upon the release of the GM New-Look bus in 1959, however some smaller "old-look" models continued to be built until 1969. Approximately 38,000 "old-look" buses were built during the 29-year production run. The "old-look" name is an unofficial retronym applied to this series of GM buses after the release of the GM New-Look series.

== Design ==
The GM "old-look" bus was somewhat streamlined in appearance (resembling the PCC streetcar in styling), similar in shape to a loaf of sandwich bread, and had windows that were smaller than those found on more modern bus designs produced after the 1950s. Unlike most earlier buses, the GM "old-look" bus was built using a monocoque design, rather than a body-on-frame design, and it helped shepherd the change from gasoline to diesel-powered buses. Most "old-look" buses were powered with the Detroit Diesel 6-71 inline six-cylinder diesel engine, the exceptions being the shorter models that were powered by the Detroit Diesel 4-71, a four-cylinder version of the same diesel engine, and buses that were equipped with gasoline engines.

Manual and automatic transmissions were available. Before 1948, the Spicer angle-drive two-speed transmission was equipped as the automatic transmission. After 1948, the two-speed Allison V-drive transmission was used. In 1940 and 1942, a small number of buses were built with electric propulsion systems instead of a transmission.

The "old-look" was available in several lengths ranging from 25 feet (7.6 m) to 41 feet 6 inches (12.65 m), though the most common models were 35 feet (11 m) and 40 feet (12 m) feet long. Most "old-look" buses were 96 inches (2.4 m) wide, but 102-inch-wide (2.6 m) models were available beginning in 1948.

In 1946 GM began offering its Thermo-matic heating and ventilation system, and in 1952 started making suburban models, which can be identified by larger passenger windows, high-backed forward-facing seats, and optional luggage racks. Beginning in 1953, air-ride suspension became standard on all but the smallest model buses, and in 1958, air conditioning was added as an available option.

In 1959, GM introduced its New-Look bus with the "fishbowl" style front window, and production stopped on all "old-look" buses other than the "second-generation" models: the 28-foot (8.5 m) TGH-3102 which was built until 1963 and the 30-foot (9.1 m) 35xx models which were built until 1969.

=== Turbo-Cruiser I ===
General Motors Research developed the GT-300, a non-regenerative gas turbine engine, and fitted it to a TDH-4512 "old-look" bus in 1953, which was rebranded to "Turbo-Cruiser"; it had an output of 370 hp (280 kW), almost double the power of the original piston engine, and weighed 775 lb (352 kg), 1,500 lb (680 kg) less than the original engine. However, the brake-specific fuel consumption of the GT-300 was 1.63 lb/hp·h, approximately double the consumption of a comparable diesel engine; the subsequent GT-304 included a regenerator and fuel consumption decreased by half to 0.77 lb/hp·h. At the time, W. A. Turunen, the head of gas turbine research at GM, cited consumption, acceleration lag, and lack of engine braking as the main faults. The GM gas turbine engine later was fitted more famously to the Firebird I/XP-21 concept car in 1954.

When newer "Turbo-Cruiser" buses were developed in the 1960s using New Look buses, chassis TDH-4512/0002 was redesignated "Turbo-Cruiser I"; this bus was converted back to diesel power and sold to Martin Lines in 1963.

== Model designations ==
The model designations used for GM "old-look" buses consisted of a series of two or three letters followed by a series of four numbers (for example, TDH-4512). The letters and numbers gave a basic description of the type of bus as follows:

Type	Fuel	Transmission^{1}		Nominal seating capacity	Series
T = transit bus^{2}	D = diesel G = gasoline	H = hydraulic (automatic) transmission M = manual transmission E = electric propulsion	-	27 = 25 feet (7.6 m); 31 & 32 = 28 feet (8.5 m); 35, 36 & 37 = 30 feet (9.1 m); 40 = 33 feet (10.1 m); 45 = 35 feet (10.7 m); 48 = 37 feet 9 inches (11.5 m); 51 = 40 feet (12.2 m); 54 & 55 = 41 feet 6 inches (12.6 m)	two digits
NOTES: 1. This was omitted for buses built prior to 1947, except for those with electric propulsion.; 2. GM also built parlor coaches (designated by P) and, beginning in the 1960s, suburban buses (S), however neither prefix was used for any "old-look" models.

== Production ==
The following buses are listed by ascending model number. All buses are 96 inches wide unless noted. Note that Yellow Coach realigned all models to series 05 in 1941.

=== Yellow Coach ===
Model	Quantity	Built	Notes
TD-2701	55	1940–1941	
TG-2701	245	1940–1941	
TD-2705	60	1941–1942	
TG-2705	2	1941	
TG-2706	422	1941–1942	
TD-3201	141	1940–1941	
TG-3201	63	1940–1941	
TD-3205	194	1941–1942	
TG-3205	71	1941–1942	
TG-3601	36	1940–1941	
TD-3602	67	1940–1941	
TG-3602	233	1940–1941	
TG-3603	81	1940	
TD-3605	82	1941–1942	
TG-3605	150	1941–1942	
TD-3606	75	1941–1942	
TG-3606	250	1941–1942	
TD-4001	174	1940–1941	
TDE-4001	30	1940	
TG-4001	13	1940–1941	
TDE-4002	7	1940	
TD-4005	155	1941–1942	
TDE-4005	16	1942	
TG-4005	147	1941–1942	
TD-4006	60	1941	
TD-4502	354	1940–1941	
TG-4502	35	1940–1941	
TD-4503	2	1940	suburban
TD-4505	733	1941–1942	
TG-4505	4	1942	
TD-5401	1	1940	

=== General Motors ===
Model	Quantity	Built	Notes
TGH-2708	302	1949–1951	
TD-3206	675	1945–1946	
TG-3206	175	1945–1946	
TDH-3207	737	1947–1948	
TDM-3207	38	1947–1948	
TGH-3207	269	1947–1948	
TGM-3207	101	1947–1948	
TDH-3209	53	1949	
TDM-3209	27	1949	
TGH-3101	751	1950–1952	
TGH-3102	1,605	1953–1963	
TG-3607	50	1944	
TG-3608	200	1944	
TD-3609	325	1945–1946	
TG-3609	1,200	1944–1946	
TDH-3610	1,771	1946–1948	
TGH-3610	5	1947–1948	
TDM-3610	55	1947–1948	
TGM-3610	100	1947–1948	
TDH-3612	1,949	1949–1953	
TGH-3612	68	1949–1953	
TDH-3614	825	1953–1960	
TDH-3714	825	1953–1960	
TDH-3501	1,049	1964–1968	
TGH-3501	116	1964–1968	
TDH-3502	181	1968–1969	45 were air conditioned TDH-3502As
TGH-3502	19	1968	
TG-4006	290	1944	
TD-4007	800	1944–1945	
TG-4007	325	1944–1945	
TDH-4008	1,491	1946–1948	
TDM-4008	163	1947–1948	
TDH-4010	115	1949–1950	
TDM-4010	4	1949	
TD-4506	1,200	1945–1946	
TDH-4507	2,899	1946–1949	
TDM-4507	146	1947–1949	
TDH-4509	2,494	1949–1953	
TDM-4509	555	1949–1955	
TDH-4510	501	1948–1949	102 inches (2.6 m) wide
TDH-4511	120	1950–1951	102 inches (2.6 m) wide
TDH-4512	3,263	1953–1959	
TDM-4512	252	1953–1958	
TDH-4515	40	1953–1959	suburban
TDM-4515	412	1953–1959	suburban
TDH-4801	547	1953–1958	102 inches (2.6 m) wide; built only for California operators
TDM-4801	75	1954	102 inches (2.6 m) wide; built only for California operators
TDH-5101	400	1948–1949	for the City of New York; used a 4509 chassis
TDH-5102	1	1949	
TDH-5103	951	1950–1953	102 inches (2.6 m) wide
TDM-5103	37	1951	102 inches (2.6 m) wide
TDH-5104	162	1952–1953	
TDM-5104	5	1952	
TDH-5105	3,630	1953–1959	102 inches (2.6 m) wide
TDH-5106	1,727	1953–1959	
TDM-5106	110	1953–1959	
TDH-5107	2	1952	suburban
TDM-5107	13	1952	suburban
TDH-5108	21	1953–1959	suburban
TDM-5108	461	1953–1959	suburban
TDH-5502	101	1948	

== Soviet versions ==
=== ZIS-154 ===
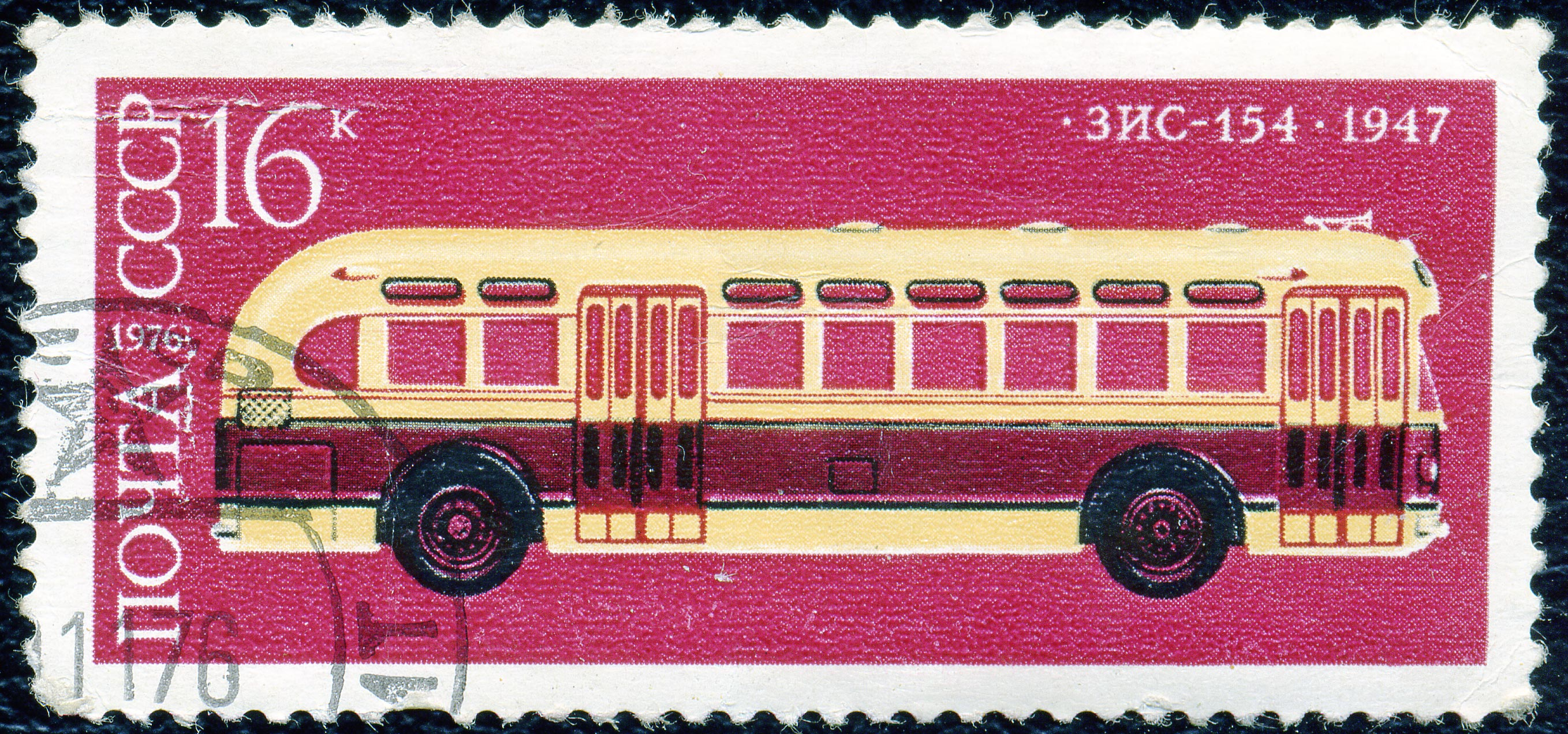
A 16 kopek Soviet stamp issued in 1976 showing a ZIS-154 bus.

Following World War II, cities in the Soviet Union needed a modern transit bus. Agreement was reached to build GM's model TDH-3610 under license (but with diesel-electric propulsion, similar to that used for the TDE-40xx models), and production was assigned to ZIS (Zavod imeni Stalina: literally Plant named after Stalin) where it became their model number 154. The ZIS-154 was first assembled with a locally manufactured Yaroslavl YaAZ-204 diesel, but supply problems caused ZIS to switch to the Detroit Diesel 6-71, also built under license. Continuing issues with the reliability of the drive-train components resulted in the ZIS-154 being discontinued after only slightly more than four years of production and 1,165 units.

In some places these buses were nicknamed "lightning" because of the rapid acceleration provided by the diesel-electric drive.

ZIS-154 Production
Year	1946	1947	1948	1949	1950	Total
Quantity	1	80	404	472	207	1,165

=== ZIS-155 ===
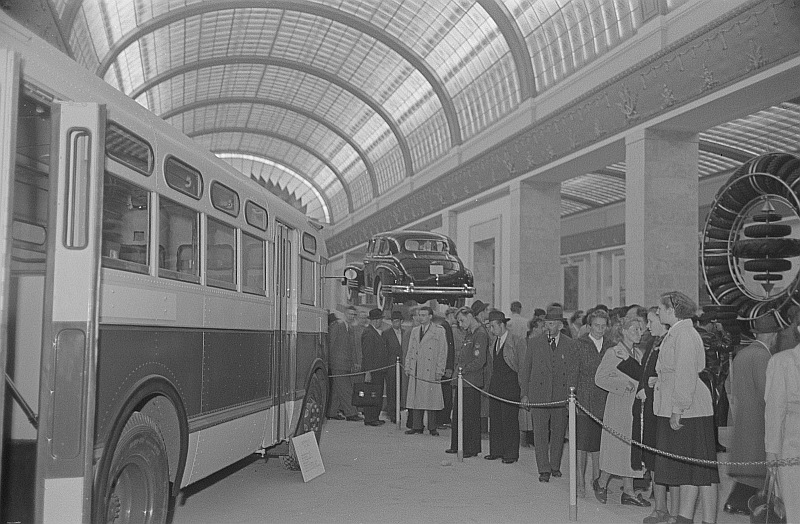
"Visitors at a stand with a motor vehicle in the Soviet exhibition hall (Soviet Pavilion), [sometime] between 7 September and 17 September 1952". Deutsche Fotothek

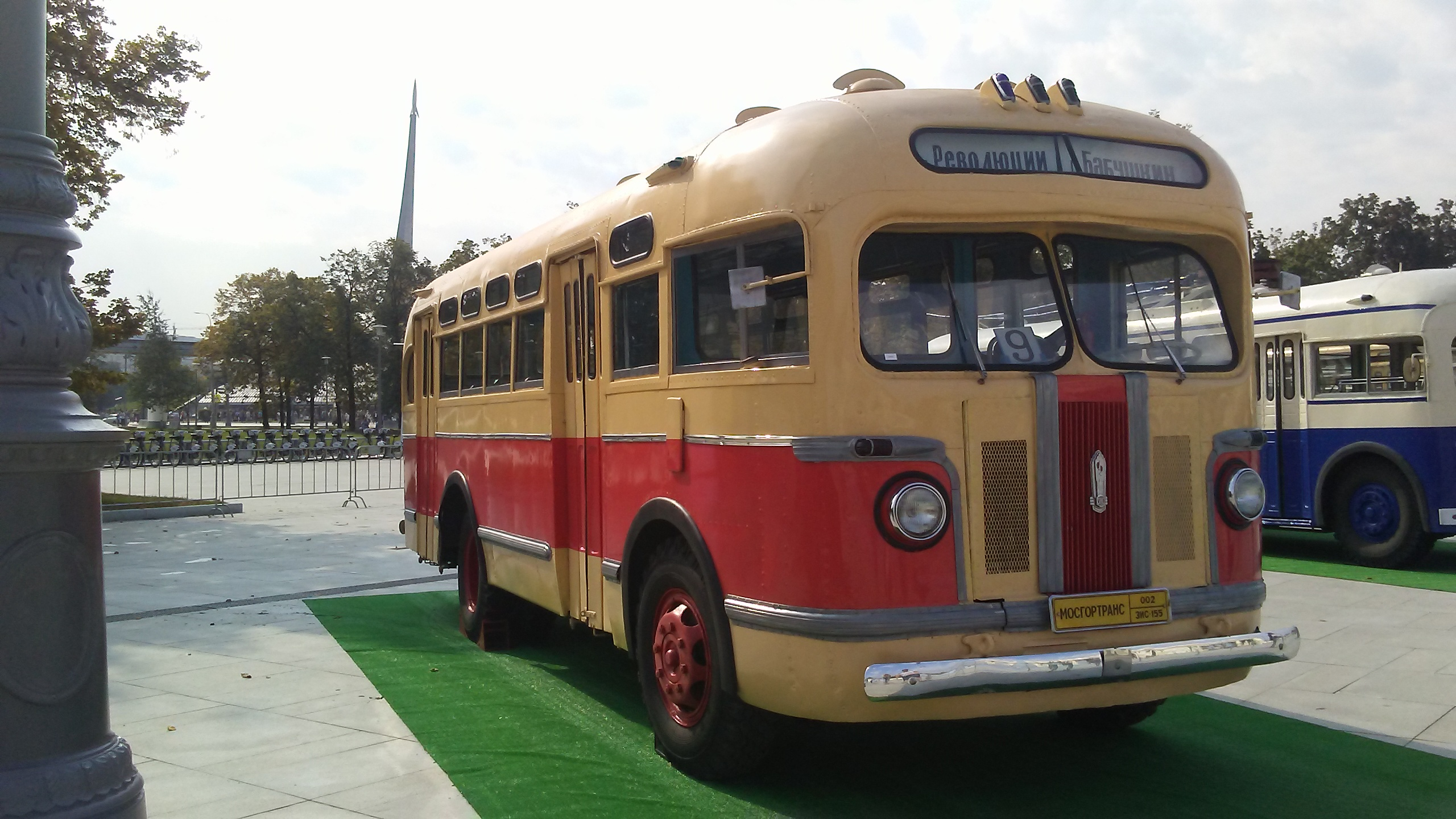
ZIS-155

In an attempt to overcome the problems of the ZIS-154, the less-technically-advanced ZIS-155 was designed. In 1949 Moscow's Central Auto Repair Workshop (ЦАРМ: Центральные авторемонтные мастерские) constructed a batch of shortened ZIS-154 bodies and mounted them on modified ZIS-150 truck chassis. One source suggests that the "Moscow" prototypes had shrouds over the rear wheels, a more-stylized front wheel cut-out, and a larger radiator. The prototypes were successful, and full-scale production began at ZIS.

The most noticeable difference between the ZIS-154 and the ZIS-155 was the placement of the doors: since the ZIS-155 had a front engine, the doors were moved to behind the axles. The driver's compartment was completely separated from the passenger saloon by a bulkhead, so the buses were two-man operated, with a rear entrance and front exit. The 154 employed unibody construction, while the 155 was body-on-frame.

Besides being the standard city bus in the Soviet Union in the 1950s, a large quantity were exported to other Eastern Bloc countries, and are known to have been used in Warsaw, Berlin, Ulan Bator and Beijing. A twelve-seat long-distance version was also built. In Moscow a number of withdrawn units were rebuilt as trailers, but they were not a success as the ZIS-155 was underpowered and therefore had difficulty pulling a fully loaded trailer, too.

From 1955 the ZIS-155 was equipped with an alternator instead of a generator, the first Soviet bus to be so equipped. After destalinization began in 1956 under Khrushchev's leadership, the ZIS plant was renamed in 1956 to Zavod Imeni Likhacheva (ZIL), after its former director Ivan Alekseevich Likhachev. As a result, late-production 155s were designated as ZIL-155.

Specifications
	ZIS-154	"Moscow"	ZIS-155	MTB-82
Seats + Standees	34 + ?	23 + 21	28 + 22	38 + 18
Length	9.50 m (31 ft 2 in)	8.07 m (26 ft 5 3/4 in)	8.26 m (27 ft 1 1/4 in)	10.365 m (34 ft 1/8 in)
Width	2.50 m (98 3/8 in)	2.50 m (98 3/8 in)	2.50 m (98 3/8 in)	2.615 m (103.0 in)
Height	2.49 m (98 in)	3.11 m (122 in)	2.49 m (98 in)	3.67 m (144 in)
Wheelbase	5.46 m (215 in)	3.94 m (155 1/8 in)?	4.09 m (161 in)	6.00 m (236 1/4 in)
Rear Overhang	?	2.85 m (112 1/4 in)	2.70 m (106 1/4 in)	?
Weight	8,000 kg (18,000 lb)	6,000 kg (13,000 lb)	6,290 kg (13,870 lb)	9,250 kg (20,390 lb)
Engine	DD 6-71; YAZ-204D	ZIS-120	ZIS-124	DK-202B
Horsepower	110 @ 2000 rpm 112	90	95 @ 2800 rpm	80 kW
Tires	10.50×20	9.00×20	10.00×20	?
Produced	1946–1950	1949	1949–1957	1946–1961
Quantity	1,164	?	21,741	5,000+

=== MTB-82 trolleybus ===
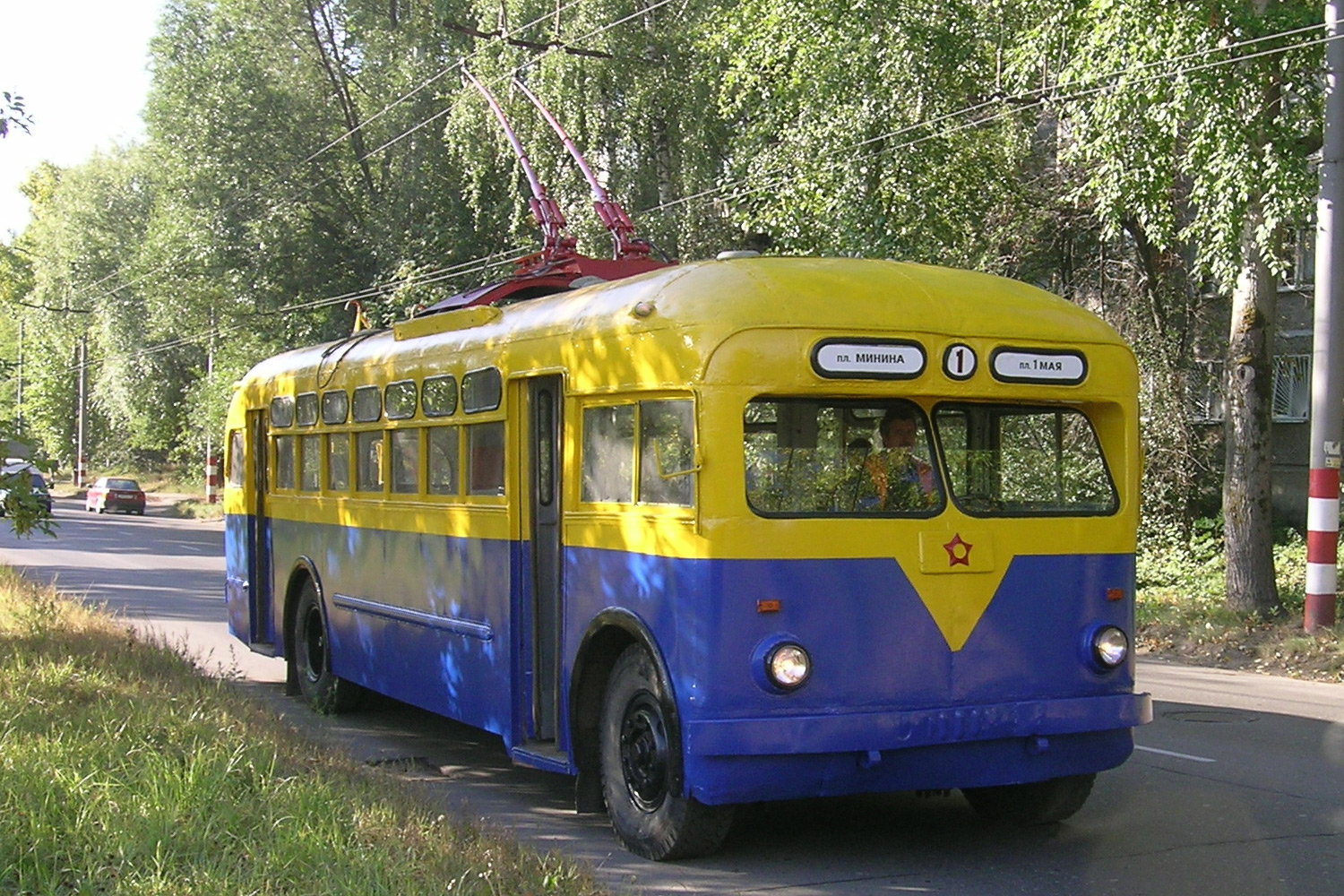
Preserved ZiU/Trolza MTB-82 trolleybus number 57 photographed at the Nizhny Novgorod Museum of Electric Transport in 2005. Photo by Сергей Филатов [Sergei Filatov].

- MTB-82 Several others of this type are known to have been preserved in Chernivtsi, Chisinau, Kyiv, Minsk and Moscow, with some of them still being seen operating on city streets.

== See also ==
United States

- GM New Look bus—Next generation bus
- Yellow Coach—Original manufacturer of the "old-look" transit bus

Competing bus manufacturers

- ACF-Brill
- Flxible
- Mack Trucks
- Twin Coach
- White Motor Company

Soviet Union

- Trolleybuses in former Soviet Union countries

(in Russian)

- ЗИС-154 (Russian Wikipedia: ZIS-154); English translation
- ЗИС-155 (Russian Wikipedia: ZIS-155); English translation

== Bibliography ==
- Luke, William A. & Metler, Linda L. (2005). City Transit Buses of the 20th Century. Hudson, WI: Iconografix. ISBN 1-58388-146-8.
- McKane, John H. & Squier, Gerald L. (2006). Welcome Aboard the GM New Look Bus. Hudson, WI: Iconografix. ISBN 1-58388-167-0.
- Stauss, Ed (1988). The Bus World Encyclopedia of Buses. Woodland Hills, CA: Stauss Publications. ISBN 0-9619830-0-0.
