= John D. Hertz =

American businessman

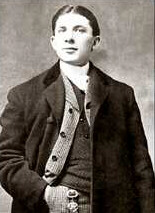
- Hertz in 1899
- Born: Schandor Herz; April 10, 1879; Szklabinya, Hungarian Kingdom (now Sklabiňa, Slovakia)
- Died: October 8, 1961 (aged 82); Chicago, Illinois, U.S.
- Occupations: Businessman; Racehorse owner/breeder Philanthropist
- Board member of: General Motors
- Spouse: Fannie Kesner (m. 1903–1961) (his death)
- Children: 3

John Daniel Hertz Sr. (April 10, 1879 – October 8, 1961) was an American businessman, thoroughbred racehorse owner and breeder, and philanthropist.

== Biography ==
Hertz was born Sándor Herz to a Jewish family in Szklabinya, Austria-Hungary (today Sklabiňa, a village in modern-day Martin, Slovakia). His family emigrated to Chicago when he was five. He ran away from home after being beaten by his father. He had just completed his fifth grade, the end of his formal education. He then worked as a newspaper copyboy at the Chicago Morning Herald, where Hertz eventually became a reporter for the newspaper.

As a young man, Hertz was an amateur boxer, fighting as "Dan Donnelly." He won amateur championships at the Chicago Athletic Association and eventually began to box under his own name. He lived at 880 Fifth Avenue in New York City.

== Business career ==
Hertz had extensive and complex business interests, mainly in the transport sector.

When Chicago Morning Herald, then called the Chicago Record, merged with another paper, Hertz lost his job. Although he couldn't drive, in 1904 he found a job selling cars at the suggestion of a friend. Because of the number of trade-ins, he conceived a cab company with low prices so that the common man could afford them. His sales pitch included a commitment to free roadside service at any hour, a popular proposition during a time when cars were notorious for their unreliability. In 1907, he had a fleet of seven used cars employed as cabs.

He founded the Yellow Cab Company in Chicago in 1915, which offered taxicab service at modest prices. The distinctive yellow cabs became popular and were quickly franchised throughout the United States. He then founded the Chicago Motor Coach Company in 1917 to operate bus transport services in Chicago and the Yellow Cab Manufacturing Company in 1920 to manufacture taxicabs for sale. In 1923, he founded the Yellow Coach Manufacturing Company to manufacture coaches and later cars. In 1924, he acquired a rental car business, renaming it Hertz Drive-Ur-Self Corporation.

Competition between the Yellow Cab Company and Checker Taxi in Chicago was fierce and frequently violent with a number of shootings and deaths.

By 1925, the Yellow Cab Company was owned by the "Chicago Yellow Cab Company," which in turn was owned by Hertz, Parmelee and other investors. In that year he established The Omnibus Corporation to control both the Chicago Motor Coach Company and the Fifth Avenue Coach Company in New York.

In 1925, Hertz held these positions:

- President of the Yellow Cab Company
- Chairman Benzoline Motor Fuel Company
- Chairman Chicago Motor Coach Company
- Chairman Fifth Avenue Coach Company
- Chairman New York Transportation Company
- Chairman Omnibus Corporation of America
- Chairman Yellow Sleeve-Valve Engine Works
- Chairman Yellow Truck and Coach Manufacturing Company

In 1926, he sold a majority share in Yellow Cab Manufacturing Company together with its subsidiaries, Yellow Coach Manufacturing Company and "Hertz Drive-Ur-Self," to General Motors. With the sale, Hertz joined GM's board of directors.

He then sold his remaining interest in the Yellow Cab Company in 1929 following the firebombing of his stables, where 11 horses were killed.

Hertz also became a partner at Lehman Brothers investment bank in New York City. In 1933, Robert Lehman sold Hertz a minority interest in Lehman Brothers, and Hertz remained a member of the firm until his death. In 1938, Hertz was prepared to buy Eastern Air Lines from General Motors but the airline's General Manager, Eddie Rickenbacker, was able to raise sufficient financing to acquire Eastern before Hertz could exercise his option. In 1943 he sold his remaining interest in Yellow Coach Manufacturing Company to General Motors.

Using The Omnibus Corporation he re-purchased the car rental business from General Motors in 1953. The Omnibus Corporation then divested itself of its public transport interests, changed its name to The Hertz Corporation and was listed on the New York Stock Exchange the following year.

== Personal life ==
In 1903, Hertz married Francis (Fannie) Kesner of Chicago with whom he had three children: Leona Jane, John Jr., and Helen. His son was born Leonard J. Hertz and changed his name at the age of seventeen to John D. Hertz Jr. in honor of his father; John Jr. later became an advertising executive and was briefly married (1942–44) to film star Myrna Loy.

=== Thoroughbred horse racing ===
John and Fannie Hertz were major figures in Thoroughbred horse racing. They owned a horse farm at Trout Valley near Cary, Illinois, another known as Amarillo Ranch in Woodland Hills, California. Stoner Creek Stud near Paris, Kentucky, became their most important breeding and training center. Raced in the name of Fannie Hertz, among her top horses were the 1928 Kentucky Derby winner and American Horse of the Year, Reigh Count, who sired Count Fleet, winner of the United States Triple Crown of Thoroughbred Racing in 1943. Both horses were inducted in the National Museum of Racing and Hall of Fame.

== Death ==
Hertz died on October 8, 1961. His wife died two years later. They were originally buried together in the Rosehill Cemetery (Chicago, Illinois). Their remains are now interred at Woodlawn Cemetery in the Bronx, New York City.

== Philanthropy ==
In 1924, Hertz provided the city of Chicago $34,000 to install the city's first traffic lights on Michigan Avenue.

=== Hertz Foundation and Fellowships ===
During the Cold War era, Hertz established the Fannie and John Hertz Foundation in 1953 with the purpose of supporting bright young minds in the applied sciences. Friend Edward Teller urged Hertz to orient his foundation to fund higher education. The Hertz Foundation Fellowship program is the nation's most selective. Typically more than 800 applicants vie for ten to twelve fellowships, which provide full tuition and a generous stipend at top US research universities. For his significant contribution to the security of the US, Hertz received the highest civilian award given by the Department of Defense in 1958.
