= New York Transportation Company =

Defunct bus company in New York City

The New York Transportation Company (originally New York Electrical Vehicle Transportation Company) was a company incorporated in New Jersey in 1899 as the 'New York Electrical Vehicle Transportation Company' which changed its name to the "New York Transportation Company" in 1902 and was wound up in 1936. From 1922 it was controlled by the 'Fifth Avenue Bus Securities Corporation' which was incorporated in Delaware in 1922 which was controlled by The Omnibus Corporation also incorporated in Delaware.

== History ==
The New York Electrical Vehicle Transportation Company was a company incorporated in New Jersey in 1899. In 1902 it changed its name to "New York Transportation Company". From 1922 it was controlled by the "Fifth Avenue Bus Securities Corporation" (incorporated in Delaware in 1922; controlled by The Omnibus Corporation, also incorporated in Delaware).

It was wound up in 1936.
