= The Omnibus Corporation =

The Omnibus Corporation (also Omnibus Corporation of America) is an American bus company that was formed in 1924 and acquired control of Fifth Avenue Coach Company and the Chicago Motor Coach Company with John D. Hertz as chairman. In 1953, it purchased Yellow Drive-It-Yourself from General Motors and sold its interests in public transport. The following year the company was renamed The Hertz Corporation and was floated on the New York Stock Exchange.

== History ==
John D. Hertz formed the Omnibus Corporate in 1924 as a merger of the Chicago Motor Coach and the Fifth Avenue Motor Coach Corporation of New York City. Between 1925 and 1936, The Omnibus Corporation acquired streetcar companies that operated on Madison Avenue and Eighth Avenue.

In 1952, the Chicago operations were taken over by the Chicago Transit Authority. In 1953, Hertz made a deal for The Omnibus Corporation to purchase the 'Hertz Drive-Ur-Self System' car rental business from GM that he had sold to GM as part of the Yellow Truck and Coach Manufacturing Company in 1925. Hertz sold all The Omnibus Corporation's public transport interests the same year, changed the name to 'The Hertz Corporation', and floated it on the New York Stock Exchange the following year.
