= Midway Yard (Chicago) =

Chicago "L" rail yard

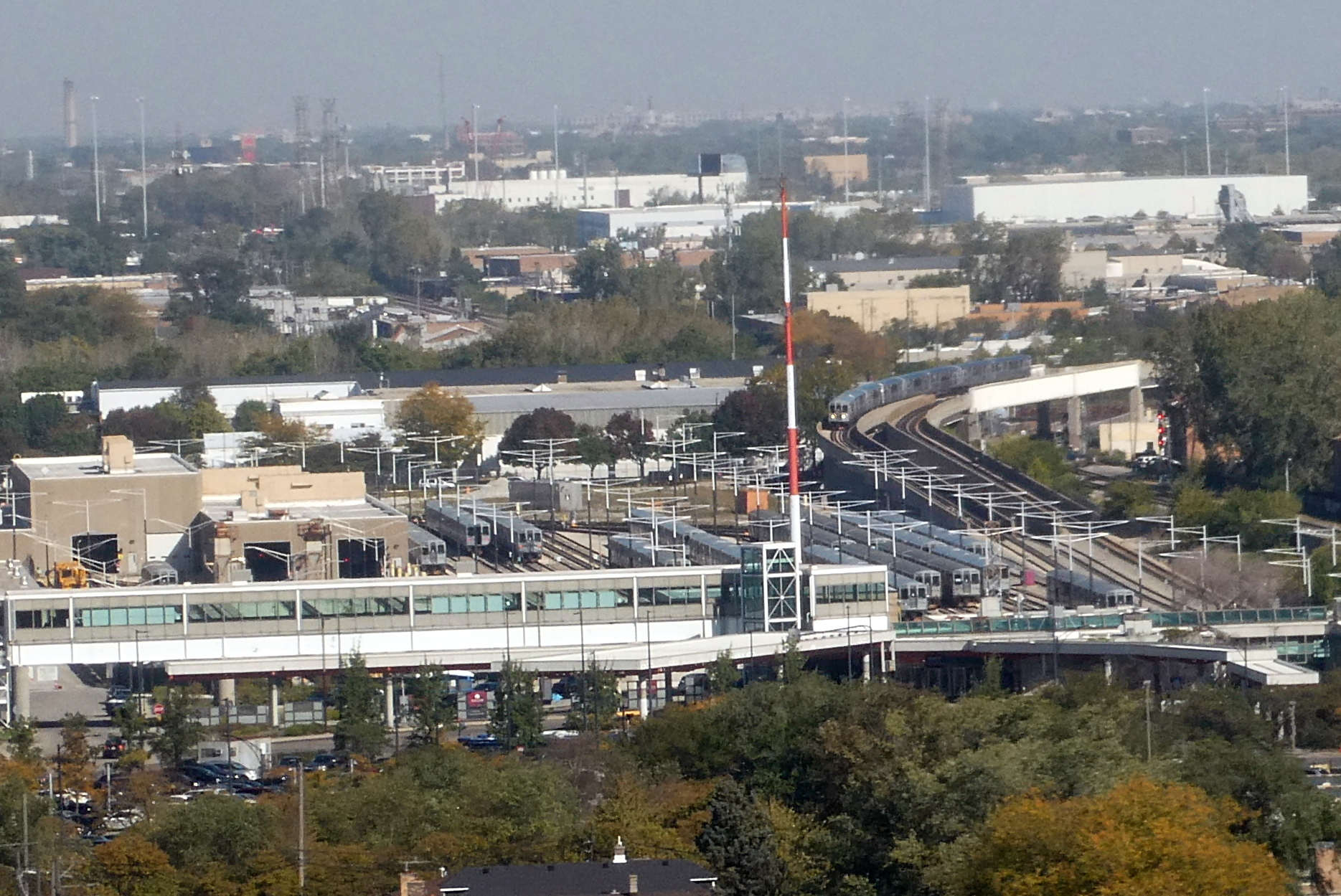
- Aerial view of the yard from the south, from an arriving plane at Midway Airport
- Interactive map of Midway Yard

Location
- Location: 5601 S. Kilpatrick Avenue; Chicago, Illinois 60629
- Coordinates: 41.7898°N 87.7387°W

Characteristics
- Owner: Chicago Transit Authority
- Type: Rapid transit
- Rolling stock: 2600-series and 3200-series
- Routes served: Orange

History
- Opened: 1993; 33 years ago

The Midway Yard is a rail yard on the Southwest side of Chicago, Illinois which stores cars for the Orange Line of the Chicago Transit Authority. It is adjacent to Midway station, the southwestern terminus of the Orange Line.

In addition to Orange Line operations, Midway Yard operates a small number of rush-hour Brown Line trips. Midway Yard was constructed as part of the Orange Line project, and opened in 1993.

== Location ==
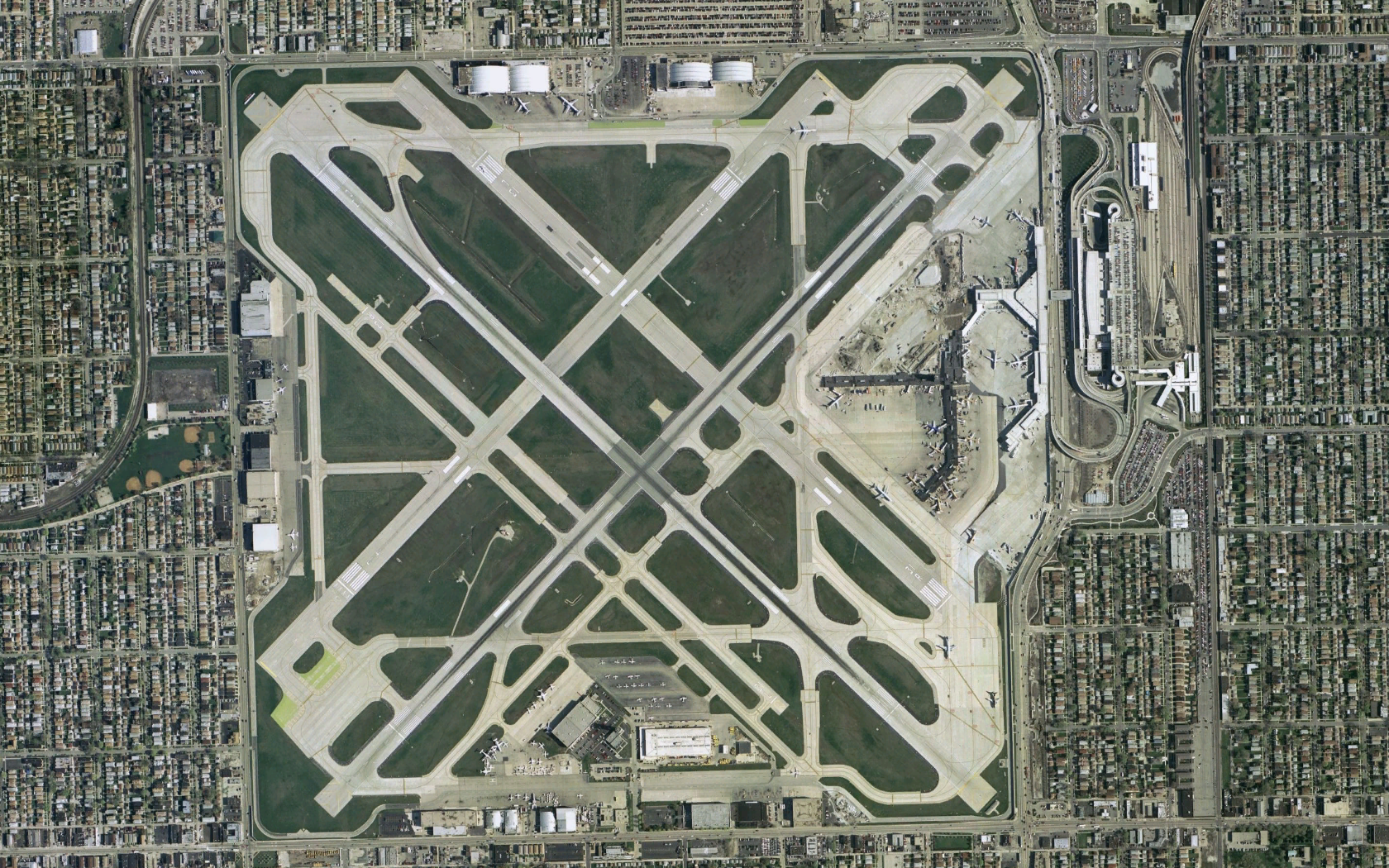
Satellite image of Midway Airport c. 2006, with the Midway Yard visible at upper right

Midway Yard is located in the Garfield Ridge community area of Chicago, immediately east of Midway International Airport. The Orange Line's southwestern terminus, Midway Airport station, is located south of the yard. Midway Yard and the adjacent Midway Airport station are laid out to allow a southward extension of the Orange Line to Ford City Mall. Planning work on the extension began in 2006 and continued until 2010, but the extension was never built.

== History ==
The Midway Yard was constructed as part of the Orange Line project, which was originally known as the "Southwest Route." Proposals for an "L" line to Midway Airport, formerly the Chicago Municipal Airport, were made as early as 50 years before its opening in 1993.

The present-day route was proposed in the early 1980s, and was partially funded by federal funds originally allocated for the Crosstown Expressway. A political deal in 1986 between President Ronald Reagan and United States Representative Bill Lipinski fully funded the line, and Orange Line service began on October 31, 1993.

== Services and rolling stock ==
Midway Yard stores and services the fleet of trains for the Orange Line, which runs from Midway Airport to The Loop. Additionally, trains stored at Midway Yard are used for some weekday peak hour services on the Brown Line, which operates from the space-constrained Kimball Yard. As of the November 2024 timetable, eight Brown Line trips per day originate or terminate at Midway, changing their destination signs from Orange to Brown when entering the Loop. This service pattern is nicknamed the "Tiger Line," referencing the animal's orange-and-brown coat.

At its opening in 1993, Midway Yard stored the Orange Line's fleet of 102 newly-acquired 3200-series railcars. The 3200-series were designed for one-person train operation, making the Orange Line the second Chicago "L" line to open with one-person operation, after the Skokie Swift (today's Yellow Line).

The 3200-series cars in Midway Yard's fleet were refurbished in the mid-2010s at the Skokie Shops. In 2018, the Orange Line and Blue Line fleets were swapped, with the newly-refurbished 3200-series cars assigned to the Blue Line and the Blue Line's remaining 2600-series cars assigned to the Orange Line. The Orange Line's fleet of 2600-series cars will be replaced by the 7000-series or the future 9000-series cars.
