= Midway Yard =

Midway Yard may refer to:

- Midway Yard (Chicago), a Chicago "L" rail yard
- Midway Yard (Connecticut), a former rail yard in Connecticut
- Midway Yard, a rail yard on the Midway Subdivision in St. Paul, Minnesota
- Midway Yard, a former rail yard in Los Angeles, now Division 21 of the E Line
