= 2600-series (CTA) =

Class of Chicago 'L' rail cars

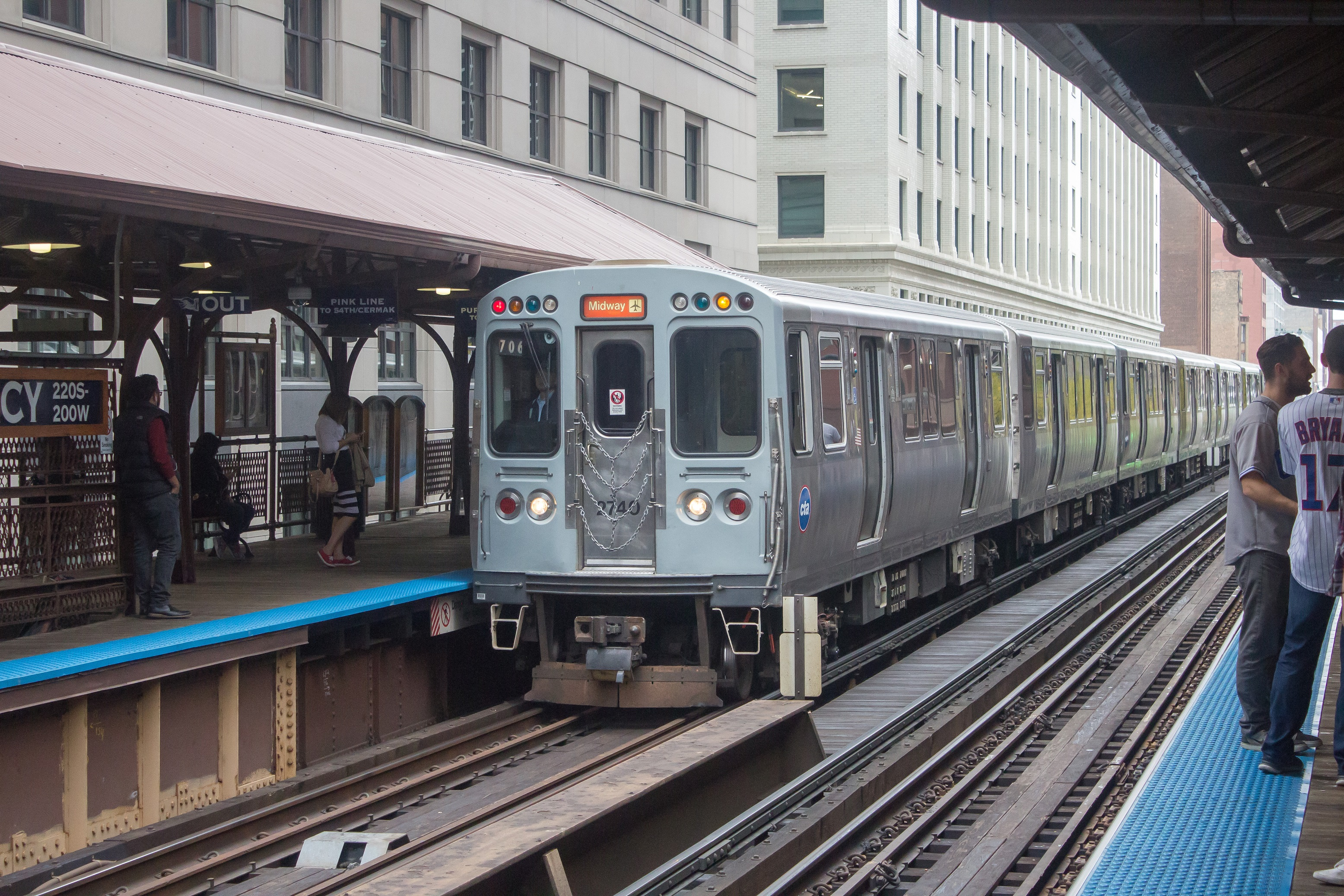
- Rehabbed 2600-series cars on the Orange Line at Quincy

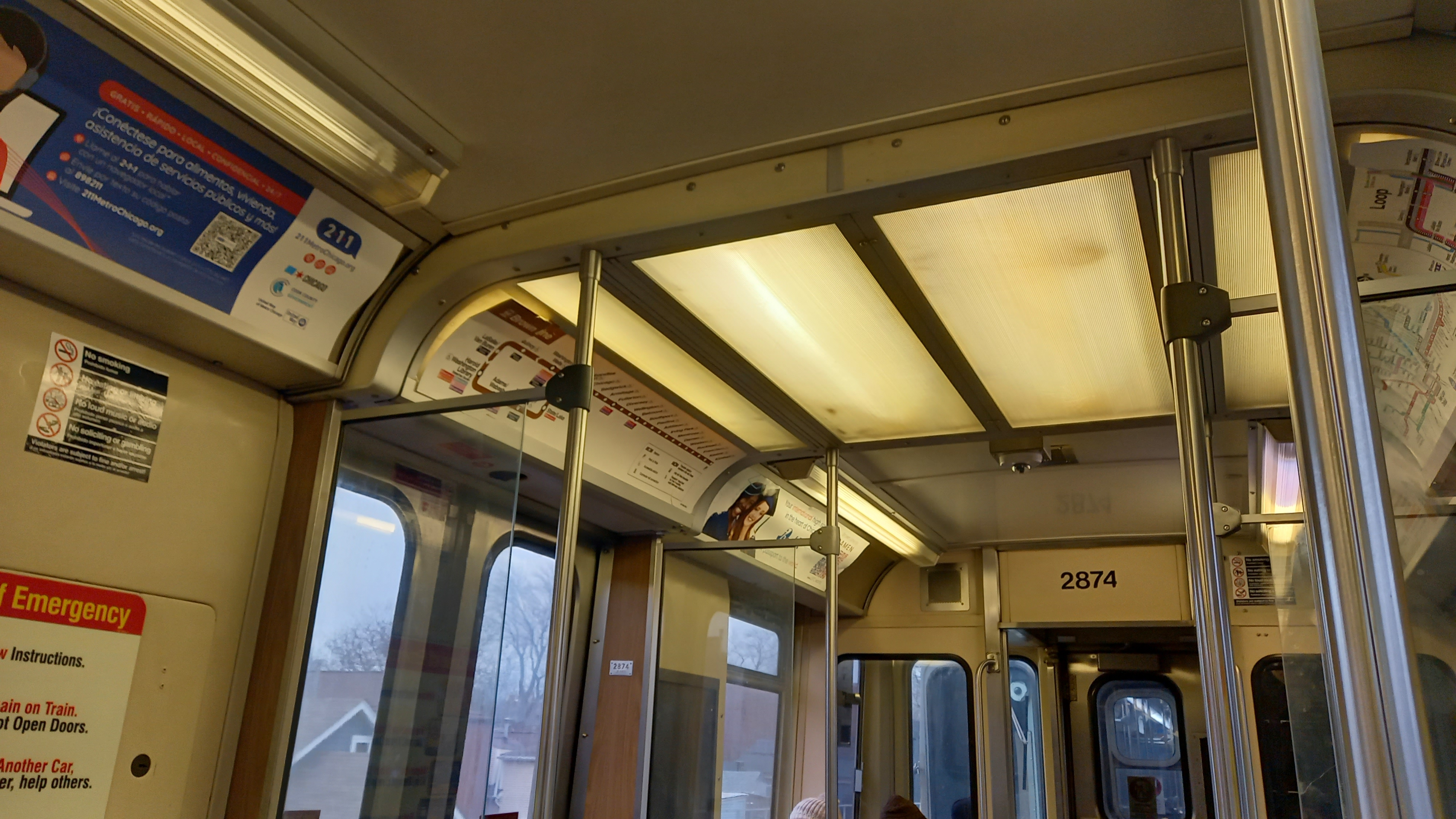
- Interior view of the 2600-series car
- In service: April 3, 1981 – present
- Manufacturer: Budd Company
- Built at: Red Lion Plant, Philadelphia, Pennsylvania
- Family name: High Performance
- Replaced: 6000-series
- Constructed: 1981–1987
- Entered service: 1981
- Refurbished: 1999–2002, Alstom, Hornell, New York
- Scrapped: 2024–present
- Number built: 600
- Number in service: 397 (additional 18 in work service)
- Number preserved: 5
- Number scrapped: 70
- Successor: 7000-series, 9000-series (if 7000-series options are not picked up)
- Formation: Married pair
- Fleet numbers: 2601–3200; 3458 (renumbered from 3032)
- Capacity: 45 (A car) or 46 (B car) seated
- Operator: Chicago Transit Authority
- Depots: Desplaines Yard; Kimball Yard; Midway Yard; Rosemont Yard
- Lines served: Blue Line; Brown Line; Orange Line

Specifications
- Car body construction: Stainless steel with fiberglass end bonnets
- Car length: 48 ft (14.63 m)
- Width: 9 ft 4 in (2.84 m)
- Height: 12 ft (3.66 m)
- Doors: 4 per car
- Maximum speed: Design: 70 mph (110 km/h); Service: 55 mph (89 km/h)
- Weight: 54,140 lb (24,560 kg)
- Traction motors: 4 × GE 1262A1 110 hp (82 kW) DC motor
- Power output: 440 hp (330 kW)
- Electric systems: Third rail, 600 V DC
- Current collection: Contact shoe
- Braking systems: Regenerative and disc brakes
- Track gauge: 4 ft 8 1/2 in (1,435 mm) standard gauge

The 2600-series is a series of Chicago "L" car built between 1981 and 1987 by the Budd Company of Philadelphia, Pennsylvania. 600 cars were built, and 397 of them remain in service.

== History ==
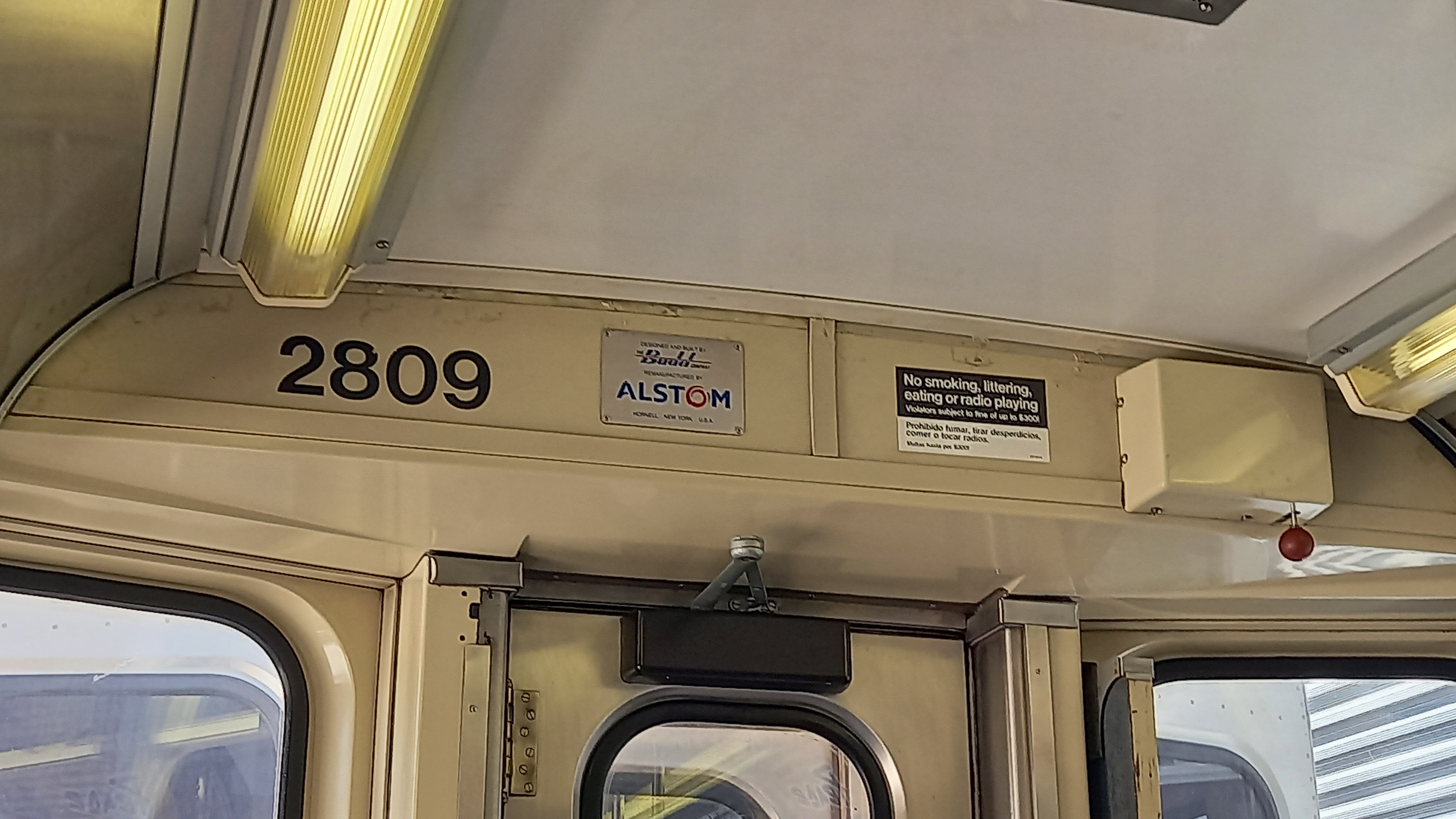
Interior of a 2600-series car, featuring the manufacturers

The 2600-series cars (numbered 2601–3200) were manufactured by the Budd Company, the same company that made the 2200-series. The fourth of five series of Chicago "L" cars known as the High Performance Family, they are quite similar in design to the earlier 2400-series cars. The cars were first delivered to the CTA in 1981, in time for the upcoming O'Hare Airport extension of the Kennedy Line (now known as the northwestern end of the Blue Line). Originally, an order was made for 300 cars, but this order was later increased to 600 cars, all of which were delivered from 1981 until 1987. They were the last railcars to be built by the Budd Company, later renamed to Transit America. The cars were rebuilt by Alstom of Hornell, New York, from 1999 until 2002.

Currently, these cars make up most of the Blue Line fleet and the entire Orange Line fleet, with some cars also assigned to the Brown Line. In June 2014, as more 5000-series cars were being delivered, CTA began to transfer the Red Line's 2600-series cars to the Blue Line due to them being newer than the existing 2600-series Blue Line cars, transferring the Blue Line's older 2600-series cars to the Orange Line as an interim replacement for its 2400-series cars until the Red and Purple Lines are fully equipped with the 5000-series cars. Beginning in October 2014, CTA has also started to transfer some of the Red Line's 2600-series cars to the Orange Line to replace the rest of its 2400-series cars until the Red and Purple Lines are fully equipped with the 5000-series cars. However, since the delivery of all 5000-series cars was completed, the assignment of 2600-series cars on the Orange Line was a permanent assignment until the delivery of the 7000-series cars in 2021.

2600-series car 3032 was renumbered 3458 and paired with 3200-series car 3457 in 1994, following accident damage to its original mate. This is the CTA fleet's only married pair formed of two different car series, and as of 2025 is assigned to the Brown Line.

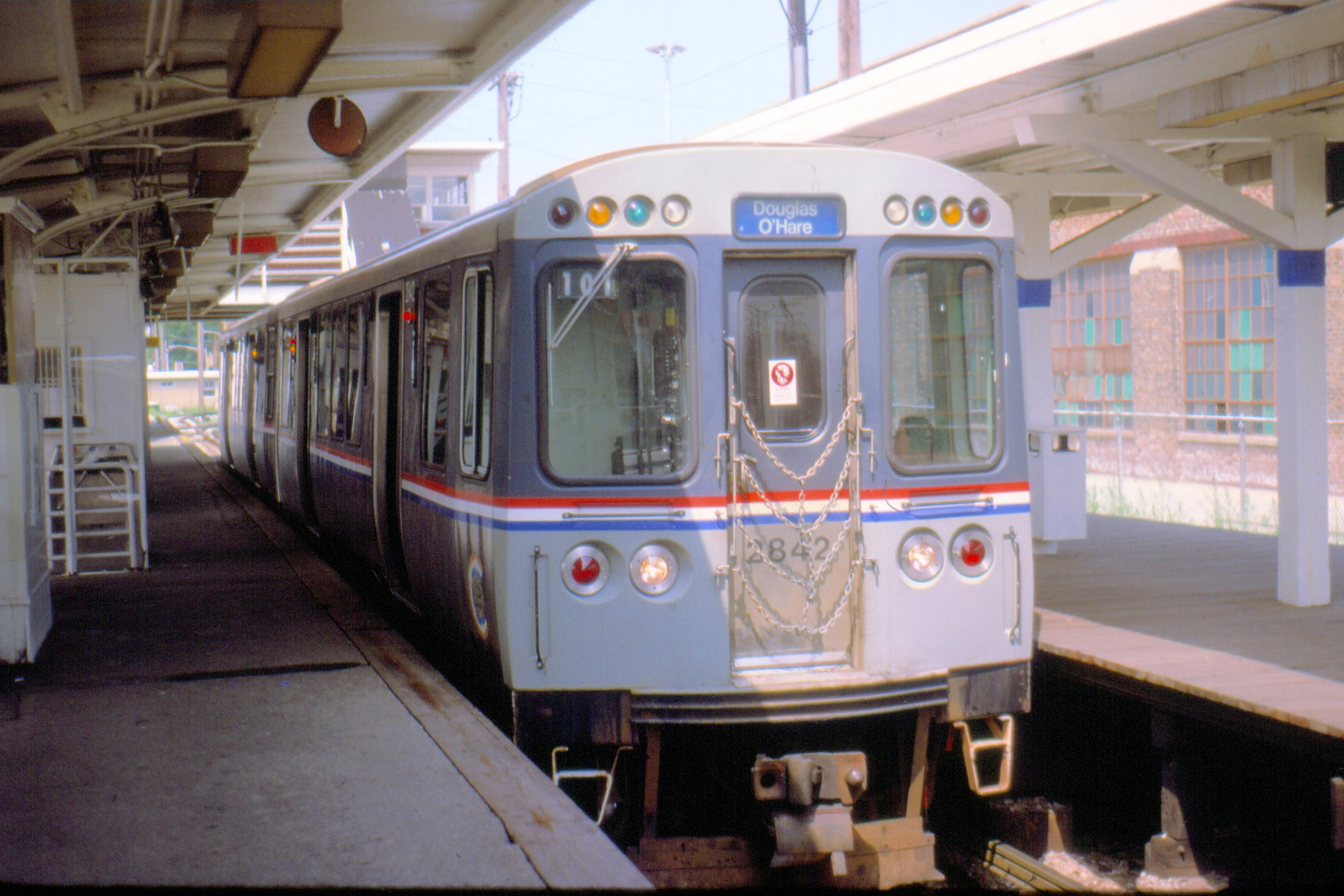
2600-series cars as-built at the Cicero-Berwyn Terminal on July 17, 1994

From 1993 until 2015, these cars were used on the Red Line. These cars were removed from service from the Red Line in 2015 and replaced by the 5000-series cars, with its 2600-series cars being reassigned to the Blue and Orange Lines.

The Yellow Line was typically operated with 2600-series cars between 2010 and 2014, when they were reassigned and replaced on the Yellow Line with the 5000-series.

When the Pink Line began service in June 2006, its fleet consisted mostly of 2200-series and 2600-series cars. The 2600-series cars were removed from service from the Pink Line on June 8, 2012 and were replaced by the 5000-series cars, with most of its 2600-series cars being reassigned to the Blue Line to replace its 2200-series cars.

From October 2013 until March 2015, some of these cars were also reassigned from the Red Line to the Purple Line as an interim replacement for its 2400-series cars, with these cars making up the majority of the Purple Line fleet until May 2014 when most were phased out in favor of the 5000-series cars. These cars were used on the Purple Line from 1993 until 2015.

In September and October 2018, several of these cars on the Blue Line were transferred to the Orange and Brown Lines in exchange for the 3200-series cars. The Orange Line now operates entirely with the 2600-series cars.

These cars were used for the West-Northwest, Lake/Dan Ryan, Howard/Englewood/Jackson Park, Ravenswood, and Evanston routes.

These cars have been used for all 8 "L" lines of the Chicago "L" system, although those that operated on the Green Line were usually borrowed cars from other lines.

300 of the 2600-series cars went out of service during the blizzard of 1999; the rehab of the 2600-series cars began shortly after the blizzard, with the first rehabbed cars going into service in March 1999. The rehab was completed in October 2002.

Budd/Transit America had completed car 3200 on April 3, 1987. Car 3200 was not only the final railcar of the 2600-series order, but was the final railcar to be constructed by Budd/Transit America; once the order was completed, Budd shut down its railcar business.

Starting in late 2022, at least 18 cars (9 pairs) were repurposed for work service to replace the 2400-series cars assigned to work service.

== Accidents ==
- On March 15, 1988, car 3031 derailed and was damaged after hitting the Wilson station platform after splitting a switch. Car 3032 was renumbered 3458 and paired with new 3200-series car 3457 in 1994.
- On September 30, 2013, a 2600-series train collided at Harlem on the Forest Park branch, injuring 33 people. Cars 3171 and 3177 were damaged from the collision.
- On March 24, 2014, a 2600-series train overran the buffer at the O'Hare station, injuring 32 people. Cars 3061 and 3062 were damaged from the accident.

== Retirement ==
A handful of cars were replaced by the 5000-series cars. The majority of the 2600-series cars currently in service are set to be replaced by the new 7000-series cars. Options for 7000-series are transferred to the 9000-series cars, which will replace the remaining 2600-series units.

Most cars are being scrapped from 2015. However, several cars survive, including:

- Part of car 2753, which survives in the Bulls and Blackhawks Madhouse Team Store.
- 2871-2872, preserved in operating condition at the Illinois Railway Museum in Union, Illinois.

Pair 2789-2790 is reported being used by the US government in Fort McCoy, Wisconsin for training purposes.

== See also ==
- R62 (New York City Subway car)
- R62A (New York City Subway car)
