= Chicago "L" rolling stock =

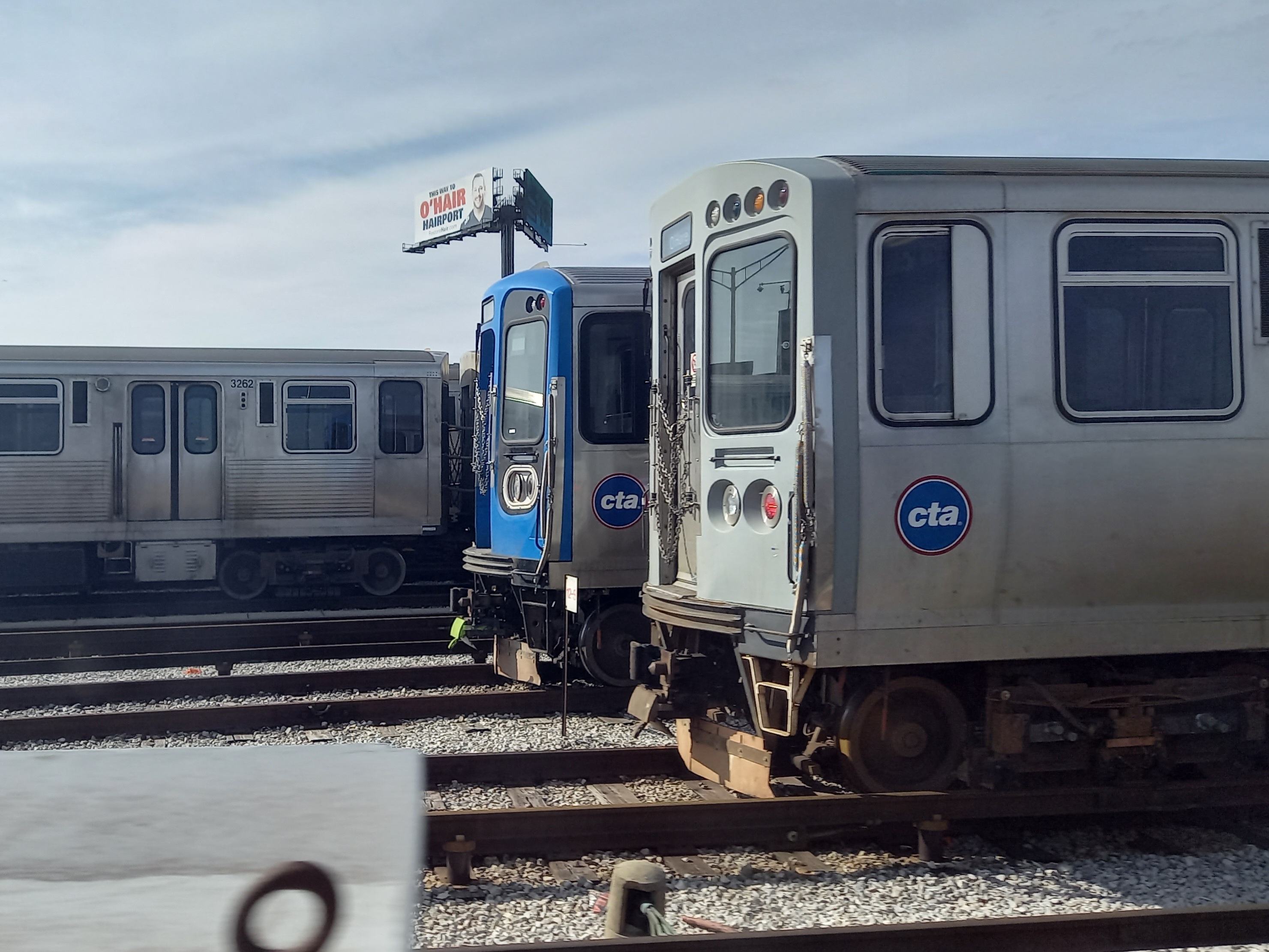
Chicago "L" train cars of various rolling stocks: (from background to foreground) 3200-series, 7000-series, and 2600-series

The current rolling stock of the Chicago "L" rapid transit system consists of four series of railcars. The oldest series is the 2600-series which was built between 1981 and 1987 and refurbished between 1999 and 2002. The second series is the 3200-series, built between 1992 and 1994 and refurbished between 2015 and 2018. The third series is known as the 5000-series; built between 2009 and 2015, they feature new technologies such as color LED signs, security cameras, new seating configuration, AC motors, and interior LED signs displaying date and time. The newest 7000-series cars are planned to replace the 2600-series cars, with options for additional cars that would replace the 3200-series cars.

All cars are 12 ft (3.66 m) tall (from top of rail) and 48 ft 3 in (14.71 m) long (over coupler pulling faces). They are 9 ft 4 in (2.84 m) wide at the window sills but only 8 ft 8 in (2.64 m) wide at the door sills. Currently, most railcars operating on the Chicago "L" are DC power only; the 5000-series and 7000-series feature AC motors although the traction power supply continues to use DC.

== Historic/retired ==
=== Locomotives ===
Operator	Manufacturer	Delivered	Retired	Number built	Notes
South Side Elevated Railroad	Baldwin Locomotive Works	1892–93	1898	46	Vauclain four-cylinder compound locomotives. Retired when cars were converted to electric operation.
Lake Street Elevated Railroad	Rhode Island Locomotive Works	1893–95	1900	35	Retired when cars were converted to electric operation.

=== Wooden cars ===
Numbers	Original operator	Manufacturer	Delivered	Notes
100s	South Side Elevated Railroad	Jackson and Sharp Company; Gilbert Car Company; Jewett Car Company	1892–1905	The earliest trains were originally pulled by steam locomotives (Baldwin Locomotive Works Vauclain four-cylinder compound locomotives); the South Side Rapid Transit was the first to use multiple unit electric cars.
1000s	Northwestern Elevated Railroad	Pullman Company; American Car & Foundry; St. Louis Car Company; Jewett Car Company	1898–1908	Car 1024 was donated to the Illinois Railway Museum in 1958. In 2016, Car 1024 was renumbered to Car 24 and was restored to operating condition with its original Northwestern Elevated livery.
2000s	Metropolitan West Side Elevated Railroad	Pullman Car Company, Harland and Hollingsworth Company; American Car & Foundry, Barney and Smith Car Company; Jewett Car Company	1894–1907	
3000s	Lake Street Elevated Railroad	Gilbert Car Company, Pullman Car Company; St. Louis Car Company and Co. Shop	1893–1909	The earliest trains were originally pulled by steam locomotives, cars subsequently converted to electric operation.

=== Metal cars ===
Type	Operator	Manufacturer	Delivered	Retired	Number built	Notes
4000-series	Chicago Rapid Transit Company; later Chicago Transit Authority	Cincinnati Car Company	1914–1924	1973	455	
5000-series	Chicago Rapid Transit Company; later Chicago Transit Authority	Pullman Car Company (5001–02) and St. Louis Car Company (5003–04)	1947	1985	4	Built with PCC equipment
6000-series	Chicago Transit Authority	St. Louis Car Company	1950–1959	1992	720	Built with PCC equipment
1–50 series	Chicago Transit Authority	St. Louis Car Company	1959–1960	1999	50	Built with PCC equipment

==== High Performance ====
Type	Operator	Manufacturer	Delivered	Retired	Number built	Notes
2000-series	Chicago Transit Authority	Pullman-Standard	1964	1993	180	First of High Performance family
2200-series	Chicago Transit Authority	Budd Company rebuilt by the New York Rail Car Corporation, 1990–1992	1969–1970	2013	150	First stainless-steel CTA cars
2400-series	Chicago Transit Authority	Boeing-Vertol	1976–1979	2014	200	

=== 4000-series ===
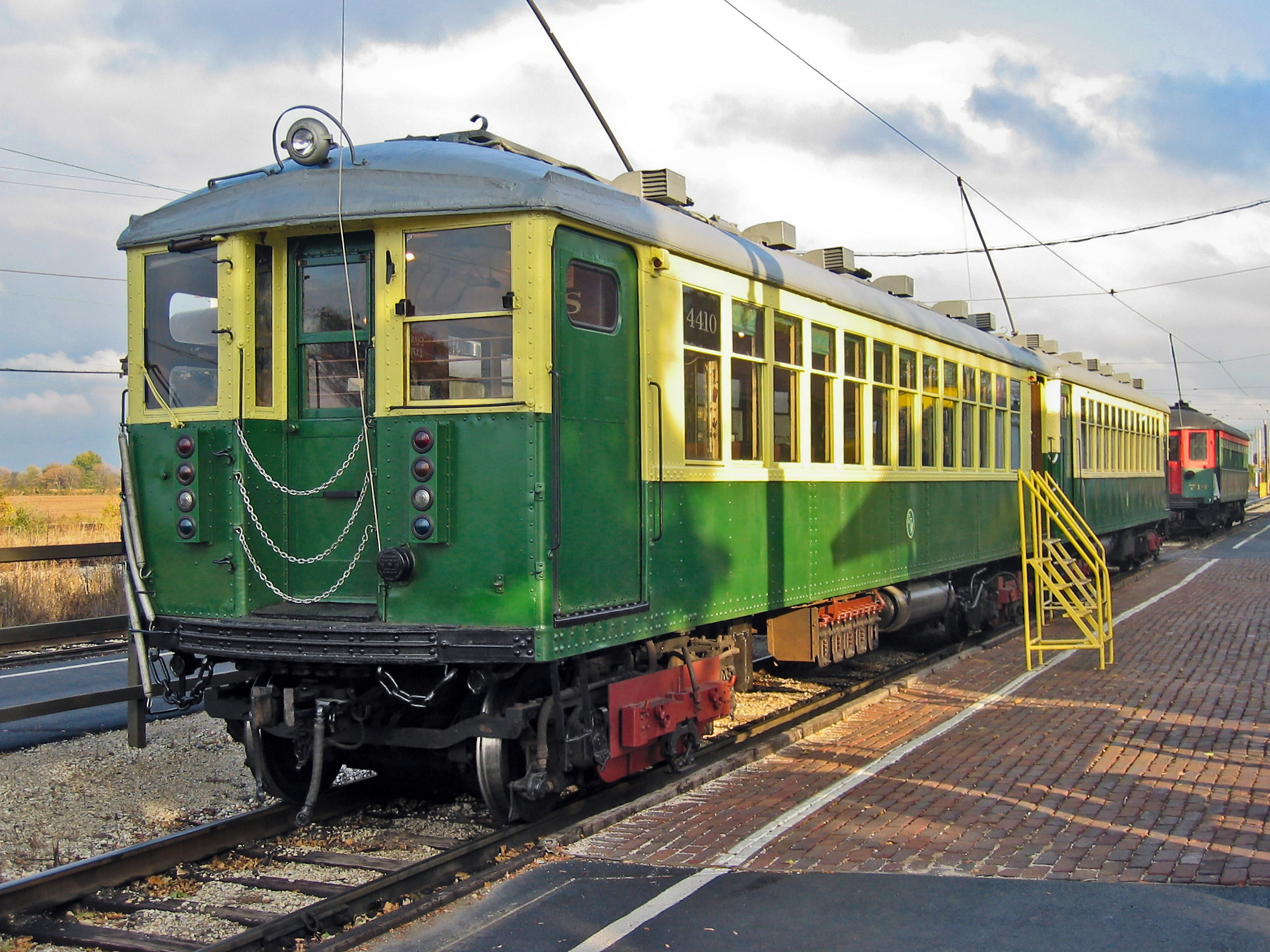
A pair of 4000-series "Plushie" cars at the Illinois Railway Museum

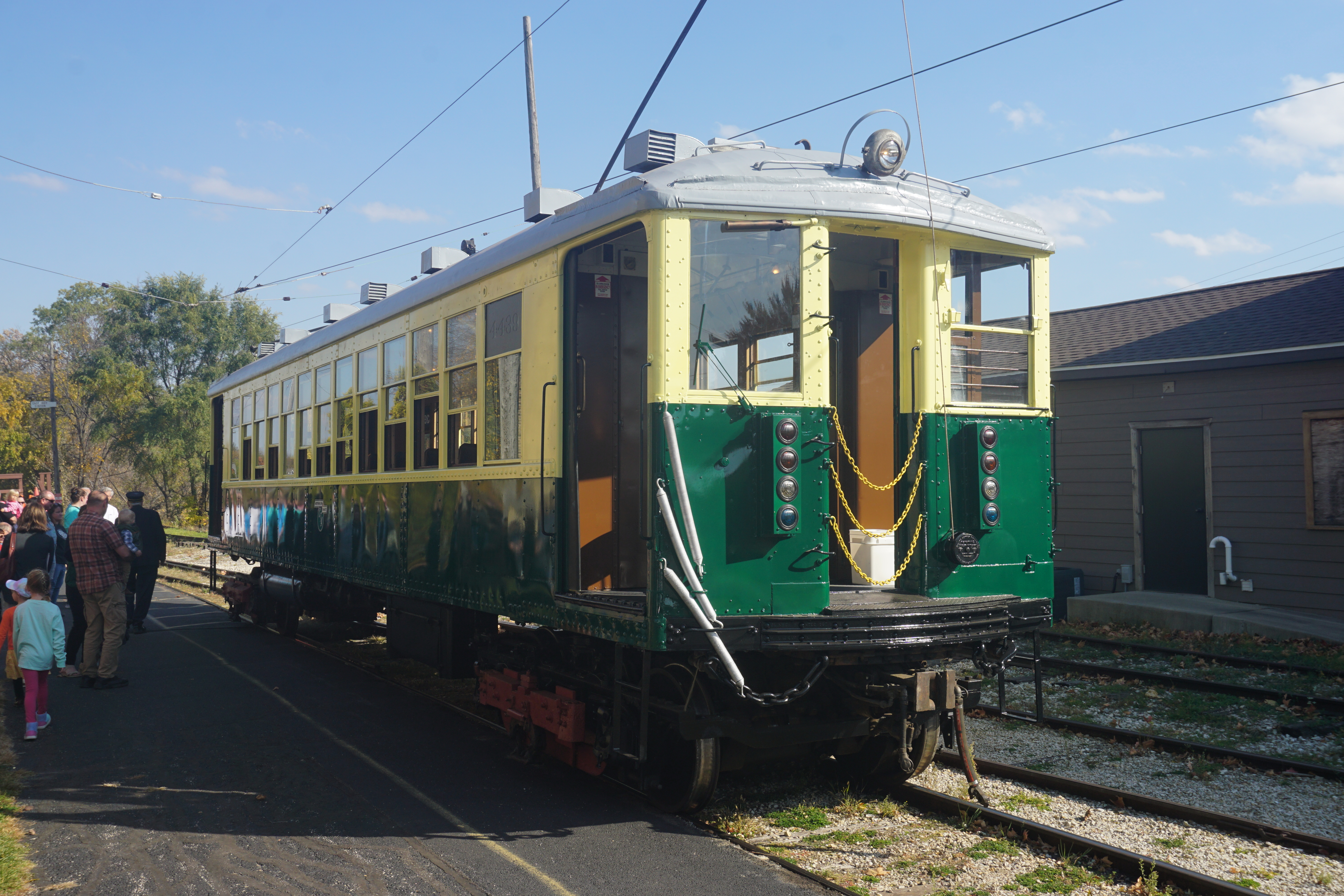
Car no. 4439 at the East Troy Electric Railroad

The 4000-series cars were manufactured by the Cincinnati Car Company of Cincinnati, Ohio, between 1914 and 1924. They were the first steel cars on the Chicago "L" system. These cars were built in two distinct variants, with the earlier, metal-roofed cars being known as "Baldies" (due to their smooth iron roofs) and the later, wooden-roofed cars being known as "Plushies" (due to their more comfortable, green plush seats). The "Baldies" were equipped with six doors per car, however the center doors were never used regularly. The "Plushies" were equipped with only the end vestibule doors, but the cars internal structure was arranged to allow for the later addition of the center doors.

These cars were built as the result of several distinct purchases (dates are the date of the order, not the actual production date):

- December 29, 1913: 128 cars: 66 Trailer (non -motorized) cars, numbered (4001–4066) and 62 motor cars, numbered (4067–4128), "Baldies", Longitudinal seating (Car 4005 later motorized and renumbered 4456)
- December 30, 1914: 122 Motor cars, numbered (4129–4250), "Baldies", Transverse seating.
- September 1, 1922: 100 Motor cars, numbered (4251–4350), "Plushies", Transverse seating.
- April 2, 1923: 5 Motor cars, numbered (4351–4355), "Plushies", Transverse seating.
- December 13, 1923: 100 Motor cars, numbered (4356–4455), "Plushies", Transverse seating.

The 445 cars of the 4000-series were the last Chicago "L" cars purchased with air brakes.

When the State Street Subway opened in 1943, the older wooden cars were not allowed to operate through it for safety reasons. The only cars available to operate in the subway were the 4000-series, which eventually led to production of the 5000-series and 6000-series cars.

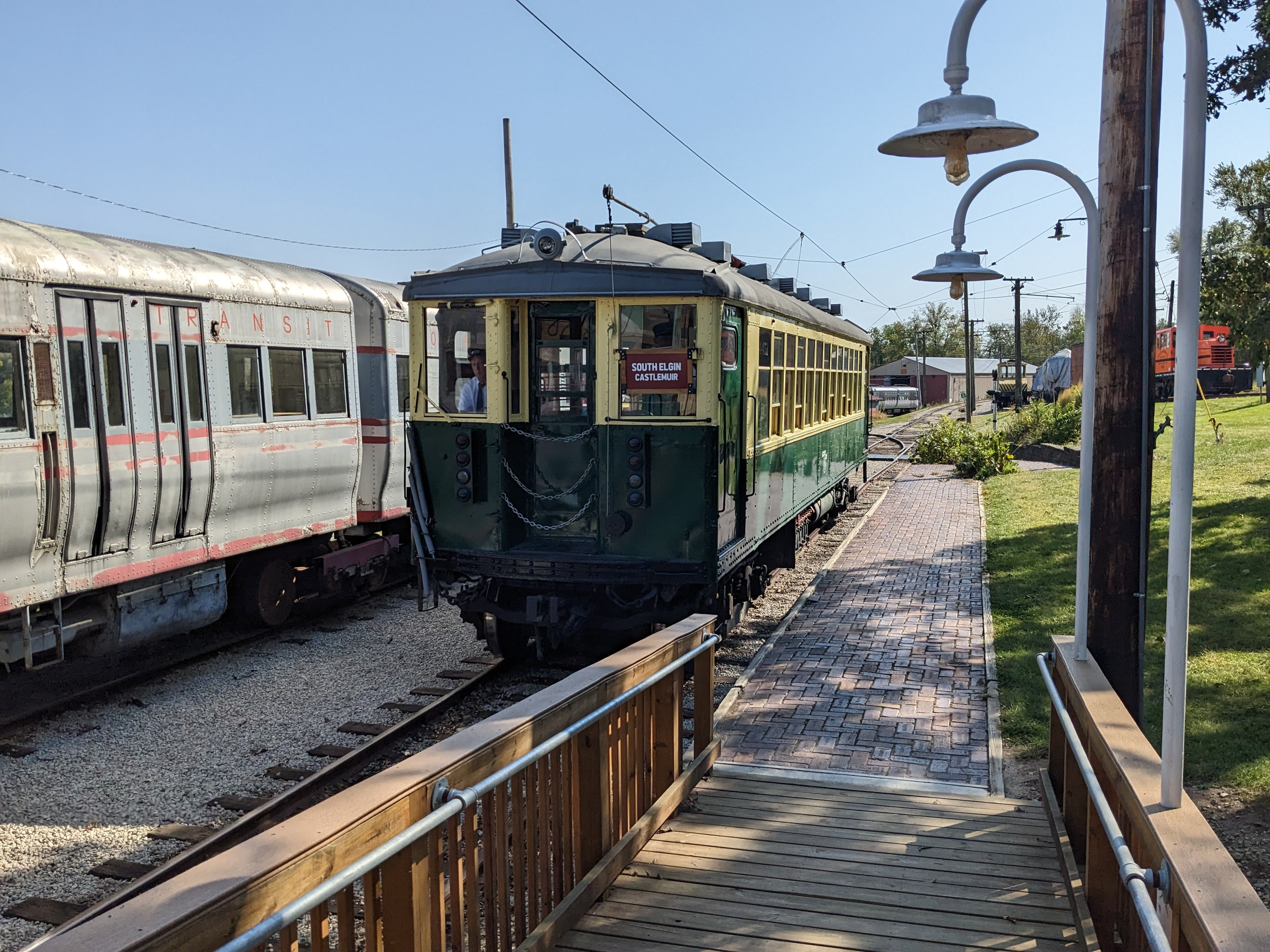
CTA 4000-Series car #4451 at the Fox River Trolley Museum

The last 4000-series cars were retired in 1973 after being in service for over 50 years. Cars 4271–4272 are retained by the CTA as part of their heritage fleet.

=== 5000-series ===
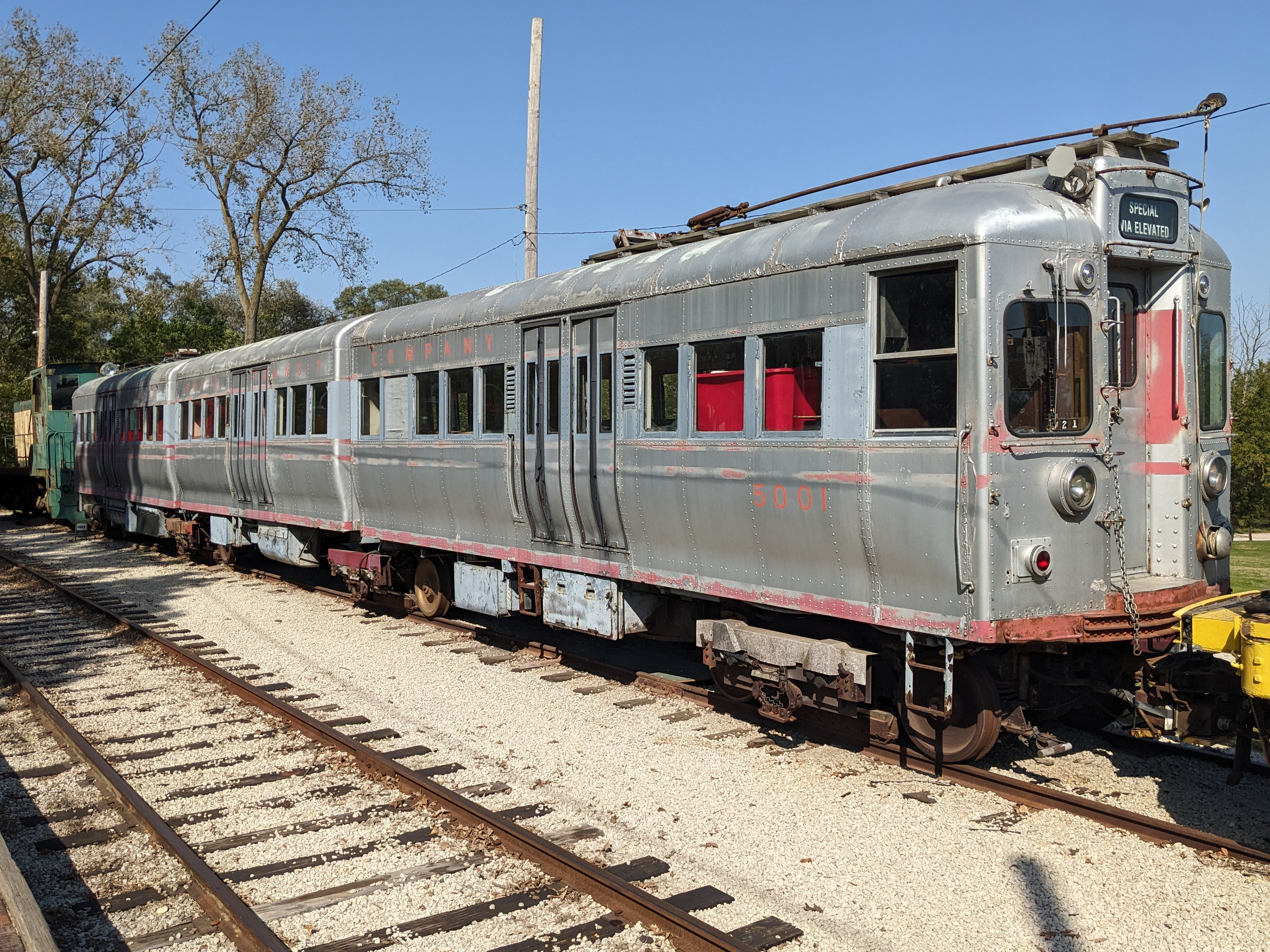
CTA 5000-Series car #5001 at the Fox River Trolley Museum

The 5000-series cars (numbered 5001–5004) were manufactured by the Pullman Car Company and the St. Louis Car Company. They arrived on CTA property in 1947. Only these four cars were ever built. These cars were the first "L" cars to feature the "blinker door" configuration, in which the doors to the train open inward into the car rather than slide horizontally. This door configuration was later used on the 6000-series, 1–50 series, 2000-series, and 2200-series.

The technology for these cars was based on the Presidents Conference Committee streetcar but also borrowed design elements from the North Shore Line's Electroliners. The 5000-series was distinct in that each car was a three-piece articulated unit, the only cars on the "L" system to ever feature articulation. They were also the first series of "L" cars to be wider at the windowsills than at the doorsills to permit more interior space and still provide clearance for station platforms.

They were originally assigned to service on the Garfield Park Branch, precursor of today's Blue Line Congress Branch. They were transferred to the Ravenswood Branch (today's Brown Line) in 1957. The cars were refitted with pantographs and renumbered 51–54 for service on the Skokie Swift in 1964, where they finished their service life. The 5000-series was retired in 1986. Two are preserved: car 51 at the Fox River Trolley Museum, and car 52 at the Illinois Railway Museum.

=== 6000-series ===
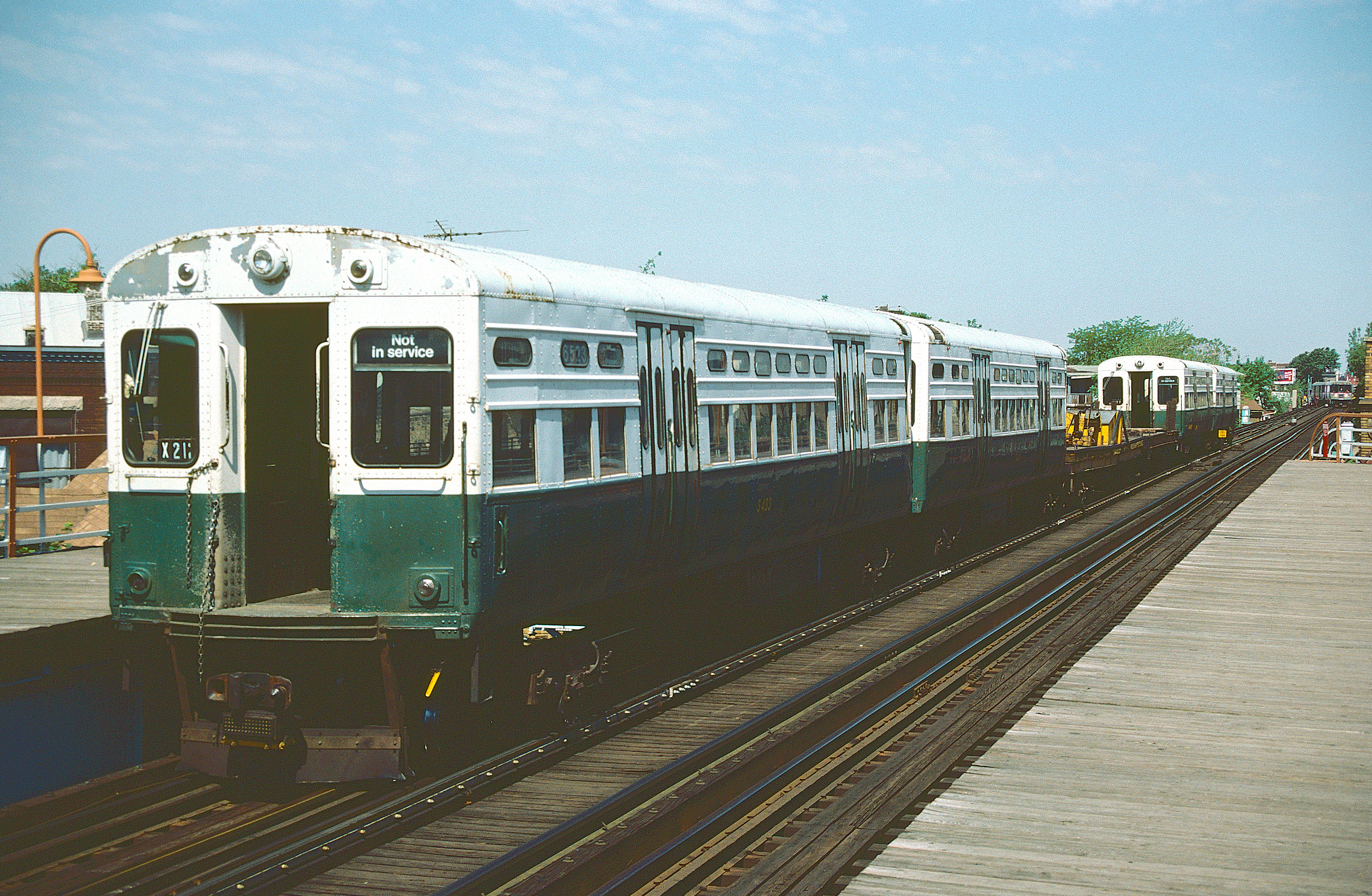
6000-series work train cars at the California station on the O'Hare branch on May 19, 1985

The 6000-series cars (numbered 6001–6720) were manufactured by the St. Louis Car Company of St. Louis, Missouri, and first delivered to the CTA in 1950. 130 were ordered originally with the series eventually totaling 720.

The 6000-series built upon the design of the 5000-series, using PCC technology and blinker doors. Unlike the 5000-series, the 6000-series units consisted of two cars coupled together in married pairs, the first series of "L" cars to be so designed.

A large percentage of these cars were built using trucks, motors, control equipment, seats, windows and other components salvaged from Chicago's recently retired fleet of PCC streetcars.

The 6000 series was in service on all of the CTA's routes except the Skokie Swift. Use on the Lake-Dan Ryan route was however limited to emergencies and during car shortages in late 1969 and during the winter of 1979–80. The 6000-series cars were used by SEPTA on the Norristown High Speed Line during the delays of the N-5 car deliveries. Most were replaced by the 2600-series cars, with those that didn’t being replaced by the 3200-series. The last of the 6000-series cars were retired on December 4, 1992.

=== 1–50 series ===
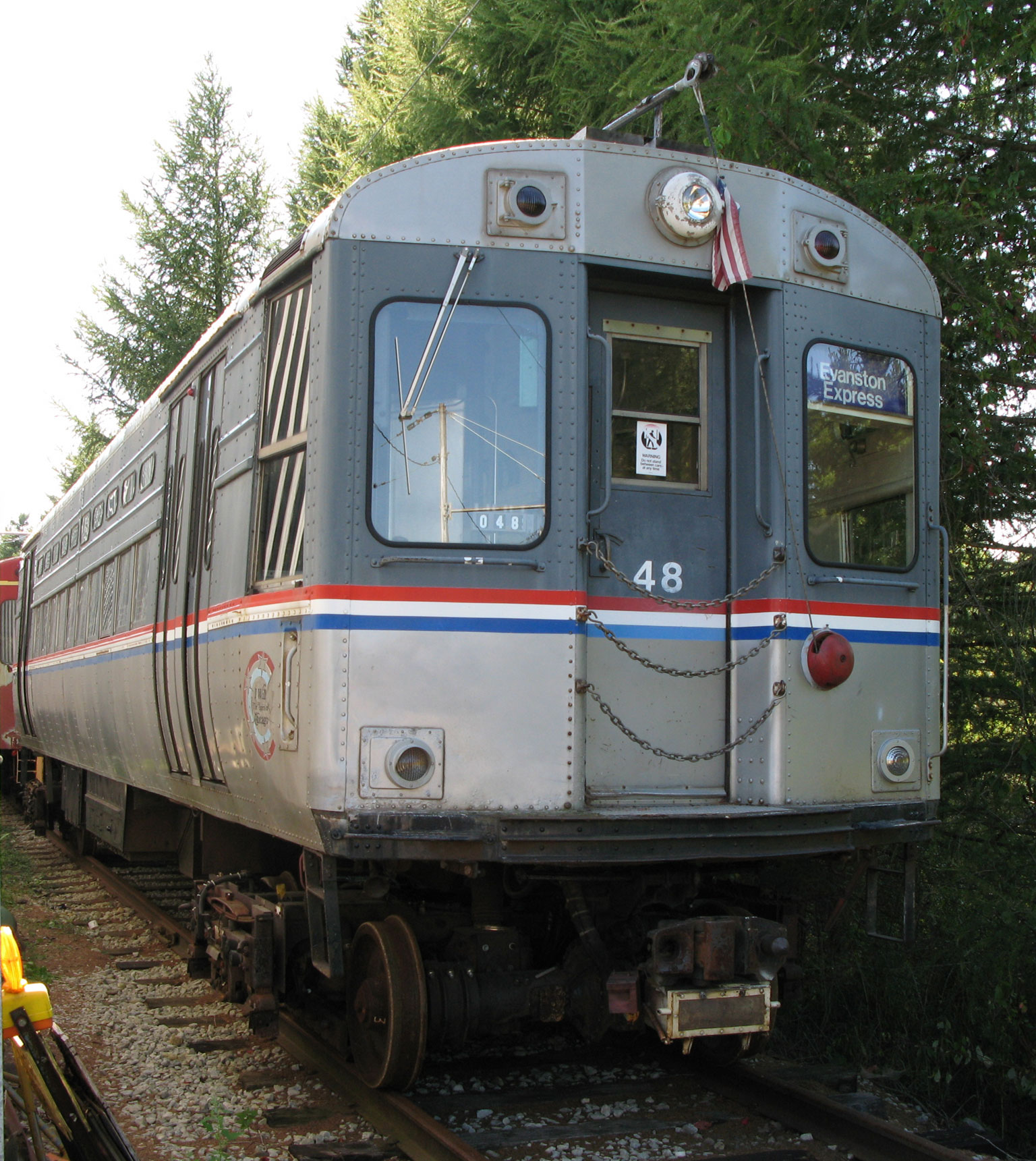
Car 48 at the Halton County Radial Railway museum

The 1–50 series cars (numbered 1–50) were manufactured by the St. Louis Car Company of St. Louis, Missouri, and delivered to the CTA in 1959 and 1960. The cars were similar to the 6000-series design, but were double ended, single cars, as opposed to the 6000-series single ended, married pair configuration. The quarter point doors were adjacent to the operators cabs, allowing the operator to collect fares without leaving the cab. Like some members of the 6000-series, these cars utilized parts salvaged from Chicago's recently retired fleet of PCC streetcars.

Cars 1–4 were equipped for high performance test service, with higher horsepower motors, and were delivered in a distinctive maroon and silver gray paint scheme.

Originally assigned to the West-Northwest service, in later years these cars were found mainly on the Ravenswood, Skokie, and Evanston lines, cars on the latter two being equipped with trolley poles as those lines ran on overhead lines up until 2004 and 1973, respectively.

Ten of these cars were converted in five married-pair sets and renumbered 61a-b to 65a-b, and were utilized in Skokie service.

In general, they were replaced by the 3200-series around 1993, but intermittent service continued up until the last cars of the 1–50 series were retired in 1998. Seven cars of this series have been preserved by various railway museums.

=== 2000-series ===
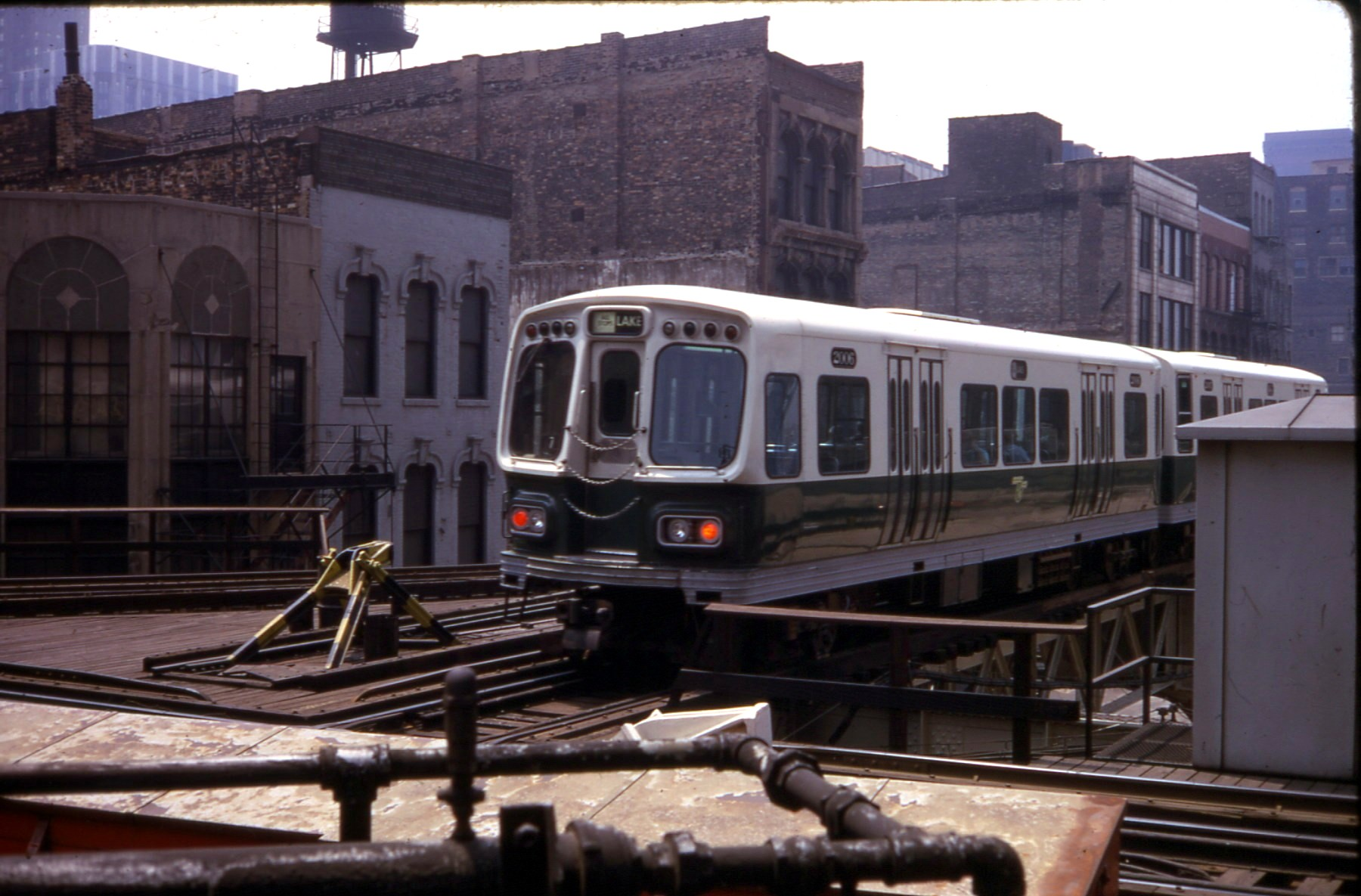
2000-series cars on Lake St. leaving the loop at Wells St.

The 2000-series cars (numbered 2001–2180) were manufactured by Pullman-Standard of Chicago, and delivered to the CTA in 1964. Like the 6000-series before them, the 2000-series was built as married-pair sets. The cars had a number of modern features, including air conditioning, fluorescent lighting, large picture windows and sculptured fiberglass front ends for the car bodies. The car bodies were mainly aluminum. These cars were the start of the High Performance Family.

The 2000-series's more modern control systems initially prevented them from being used in a train with other types, until the delivery of the 2200-series and later cars.

The last 2000-series cars were scrapped after their final service on the Green Line on December 17, 1993.

The 2000-series had a short service life of only 29 years, with most of the cars in the series being scrapped in 1993. Two cars are preserved at the Illinois Railway Museum in Union, Illinois.

=== 2200-series ===
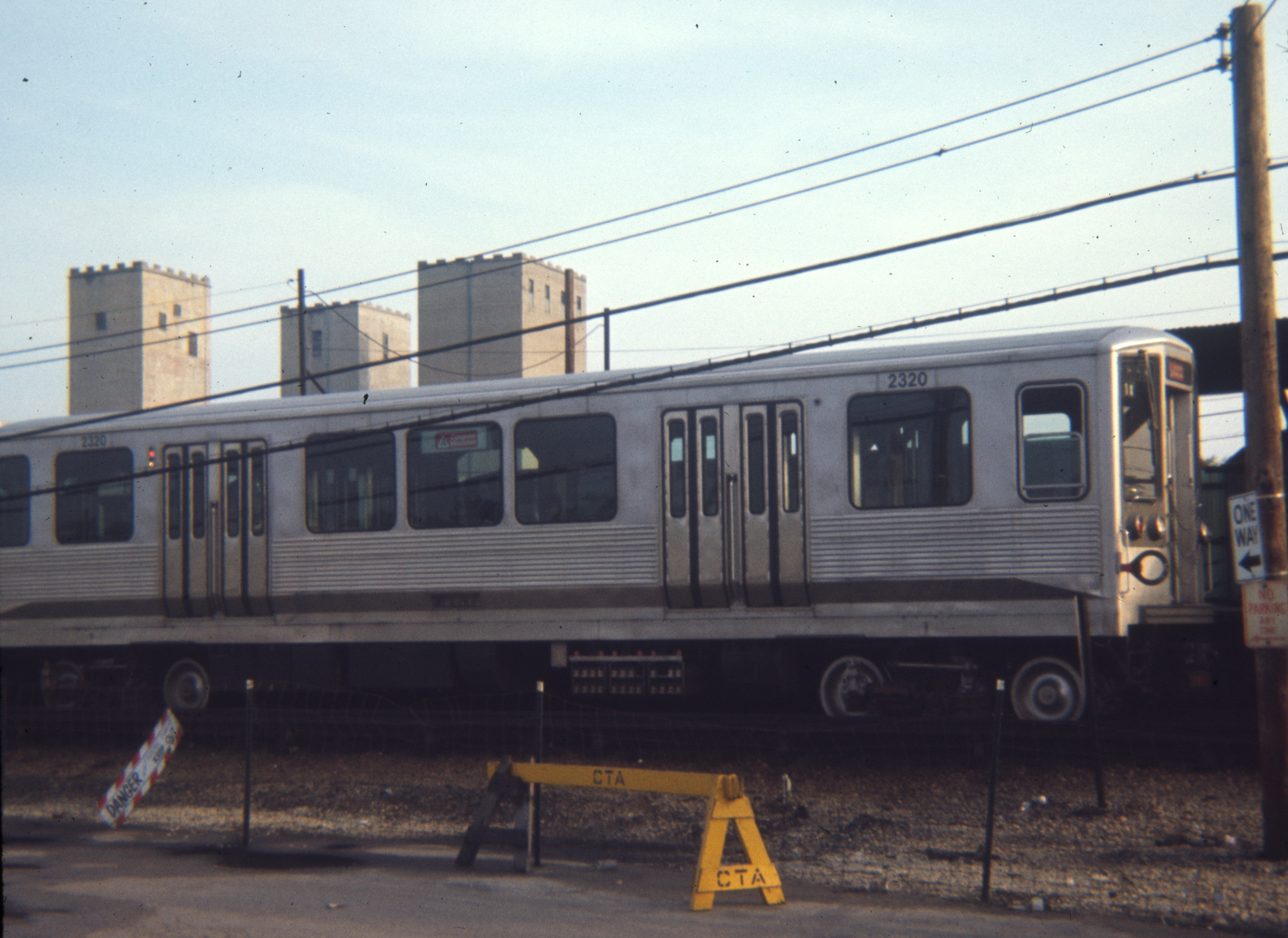
A 2200-series car at the Des Plaines Terminal on June 1, 1970

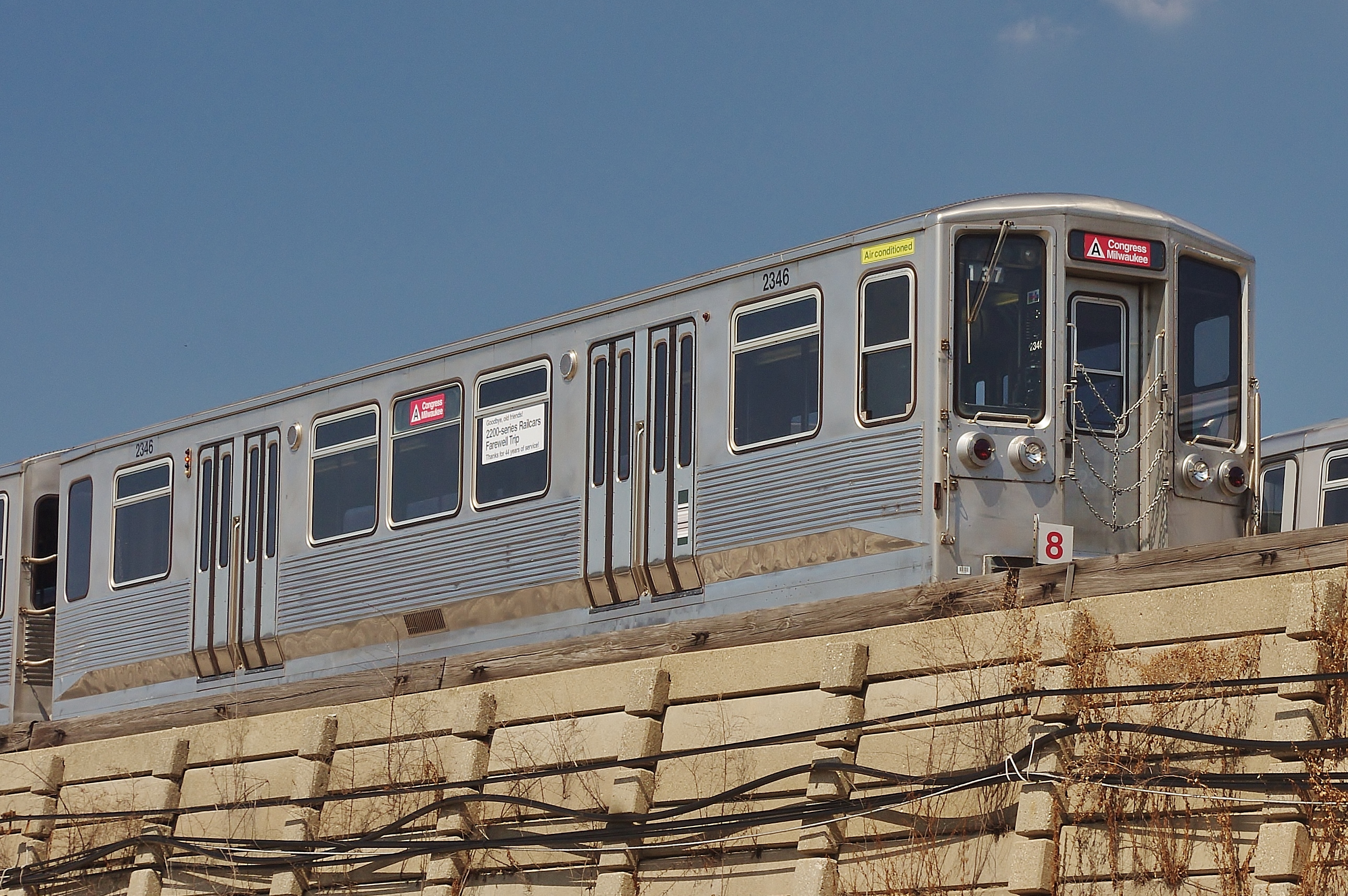
Retired 2200-series car 2346 in the Harlem Yard on August 24, 2013

The 2200-series cars (numbered 2201–2350) were manufactured by the Budd Company of Philadelphia, Pennsylvania, and first delivered to the CTA in 1969, before the Dan Ryan branch (now known as the south end of the Red Line) opened. 150 cars were ordered, and all delivered in 1969 and 1970. These cars were the last to feature the blinker door configuration, in which the doors to the train opened inward into the car rather than slide horizontally. These doors, which had a much narrower opening than the newer sliding doors, were unable to accommodate a wheelchair. Because of this, all 2200-series cars that ran in regular service on the Blue Line had to be coupled with a married pair of 2600-series cars, in order to comply with the Americans with Disabilities Act of 1990. In addition, during eight car operation on the Blue Line, the 2200-series cars were referred to as belly car service (which means that they are not at either end of the consist), with 2600-series cars on the ends of the train.

The 2200-series also featured fluted, unpainted stainless steel sides, a unique feature in the rolling stock until the delivery of the 3200-series.

Cars 2307 and 2316 were renumbered 2351 and 2352; 2351 was originally numbered 2307 and repaired after its mate 2308 was damaged in an accident at Addison station in 1976; 2352 was renumbered from 2316 and paired with 2351 after 2315 was damaged in a fire in the Skokie Shops yard in November 1977. Cars 2289 and 2290 were damaged in the 1977 Chicago Loop derailment on February 4, 1977. After the derailment cars 2289 and 2290 were later retired and scrapped.

The cars were rebuilt by the New York Rail Car Corporation of Brooklyn, New York, from 1990 until 1992, to extend their service life.

Retirement of the 2200-series cars began in October 2010 and was completed in August 2013. The last eight 2200-series cars were retired from service after their ceremonial last trips on the Blue Line on August 8, 2013. The farewell tour of the 2200-series cars took place on a six-car private charter ran by Eric Zabelny on August 25, 2013, which toured most of the CTA system. Cars 2243–2244 are preserved at the Illinois Railway Museum in Union, Illinois.

=== 2400-series ===
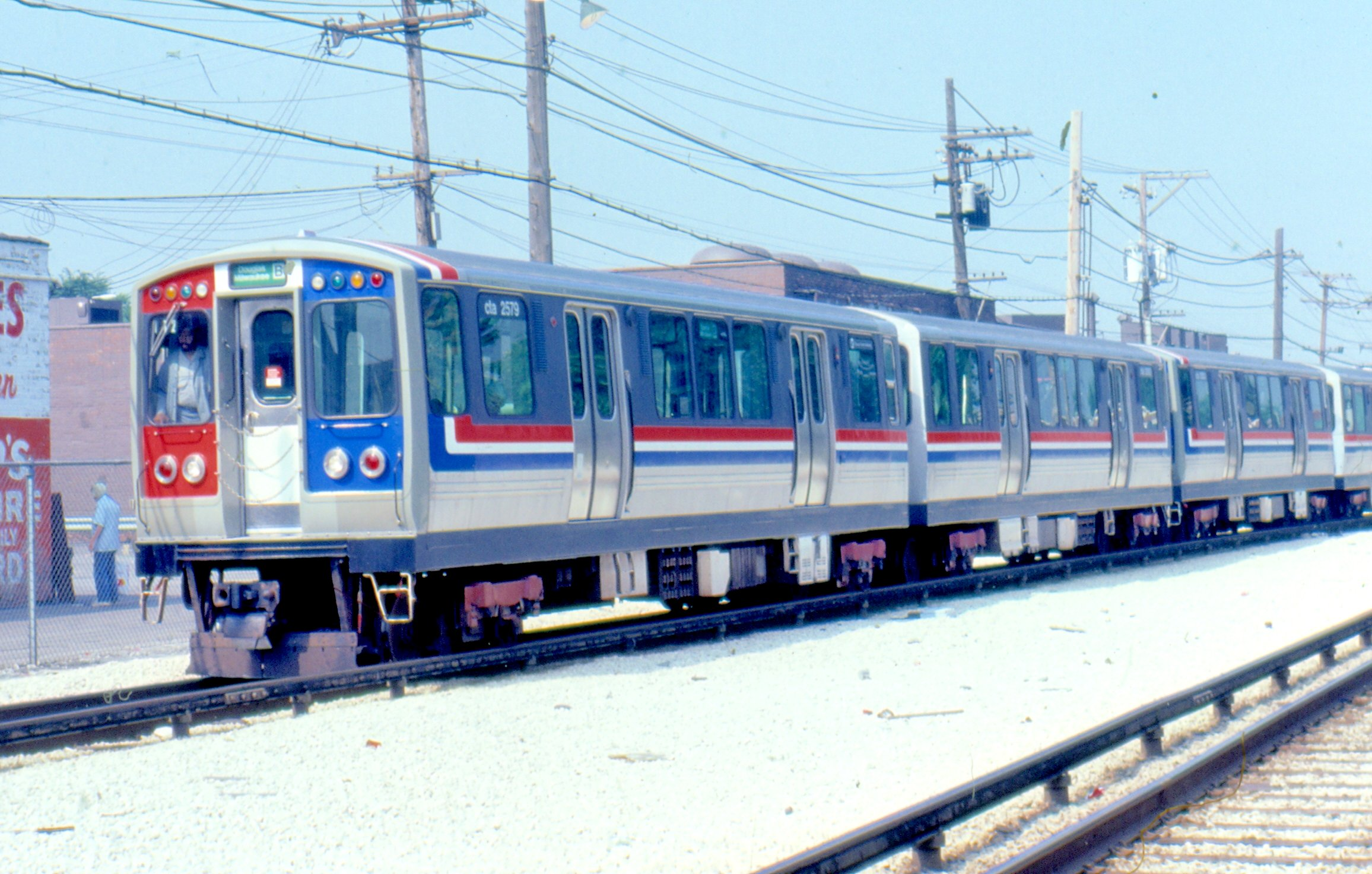
Prior to their rehab, the 2400-series trains were painted in red, white, and blue colors to celebrate the Bicentennial.

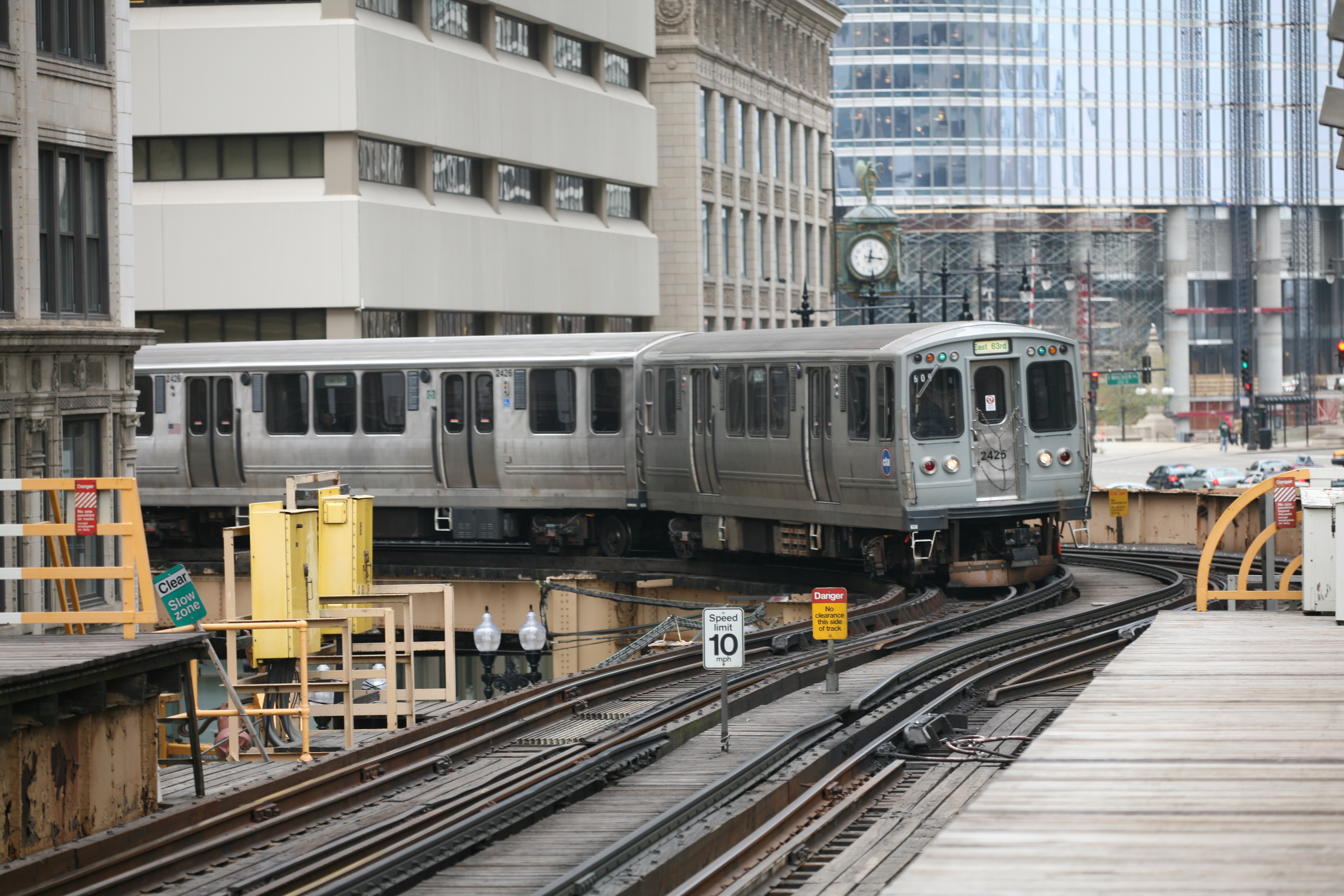
After their rehab, the 2400-series trains had their colors removed to better match the rest of the fleet.

The 2400-series cars (numbered 2401–2600) were manufactured by Boeing-Vertol of Ridley Park, Pennsylvania, and first delivered to the CTA in 1976. 100 were ordered originally, with an option for an additional 100 (which was exercised and the additional cars delivered through 1979). Retirement of the 2400-series cars began in 2013 after all of the 2200-series cars were retired from service and was completed in October 2014.

The first cars for the "L" to feature sliding doors, the 2400-series also features smooth steel exteriors, ideal for decals and, in many cases, advertisements. As delivered, the cars featured a red, white, and blue color scheme on the front and rear of the cars, as well as stripes along the sides. These were modified several times over the years and the colors were eventually removed from all cars, leaving them unpainted to match the bare stainless steel scheme of the rest of the fleet. Some cars feature advertising and cars 2401–2422 are work cars which are identified by red and white striping along their sides as well as on the front and rear of the cars. (Cars 2423–2424 were converted to work cars some time after 2401–2422 had been converted.)

The cars were rehabbed at the Skokie Shops in Skokie, Illinois, from 1987 until 1995.

In the 1990s, the 2400-series cars were used on the Red Line in mixed consists with unrehabbed 2600-series cars. While the 2600-series cars were being rebuilt, the 2400-series cars were used temporarily on the Red Line. The 2400-series cars were retired from service on October 31, 2014, with the Orange Line being the last line to operate them. The ceremonial last trip of the 2400-series cars was held on January 21, 2015. Cars 2433–2434 are preserved at the Illinois Railway Museum in Union, Illinois, and the cars used for the ceremonial last trip have been preserved as part of CTA's historic fleet.

== Current ==
Type	Manufacturer	Delivered	Rehabilitated	Number built	Assigned lines	Traction motors
2600-series	Budd Company rebuilt by Alstom	1981–1987	1999–2002	600	Blue Line; Brown Line; Orange Line	GE 1262A1 DC
2600-series	Budd Company rebuilt by Alstom	1981–1987	1999–2002	600	Blue Line; Brown Line	GE 1262A1 DC
3200-series	Morrison–Knudsen	1992–1994	2015–2018	257	Blue Line; Brown Line	GE 1262A4 DC
5000-series	Bombardier Transportation	2009–2015		714	Green Line; Pink Line; Purple Line; Red Line; Yellow Line; Blue Line (UIC–Jefferson Park rush hour runs only)	Bombardier MITRAC IGBT–VVVF asynchronous 3-phase AC
7000-series	CRRC Sifang America	2019–		400 (base order); 846 (all options included)	Blue Line	Siemens IGBT–VVVF asynchronous 3-phase AC
9000-series	TBD	TBD		300 (base order); 246 (all options included)		

See chicago-l.org for car assignment sheets.

=== 2600-series ===
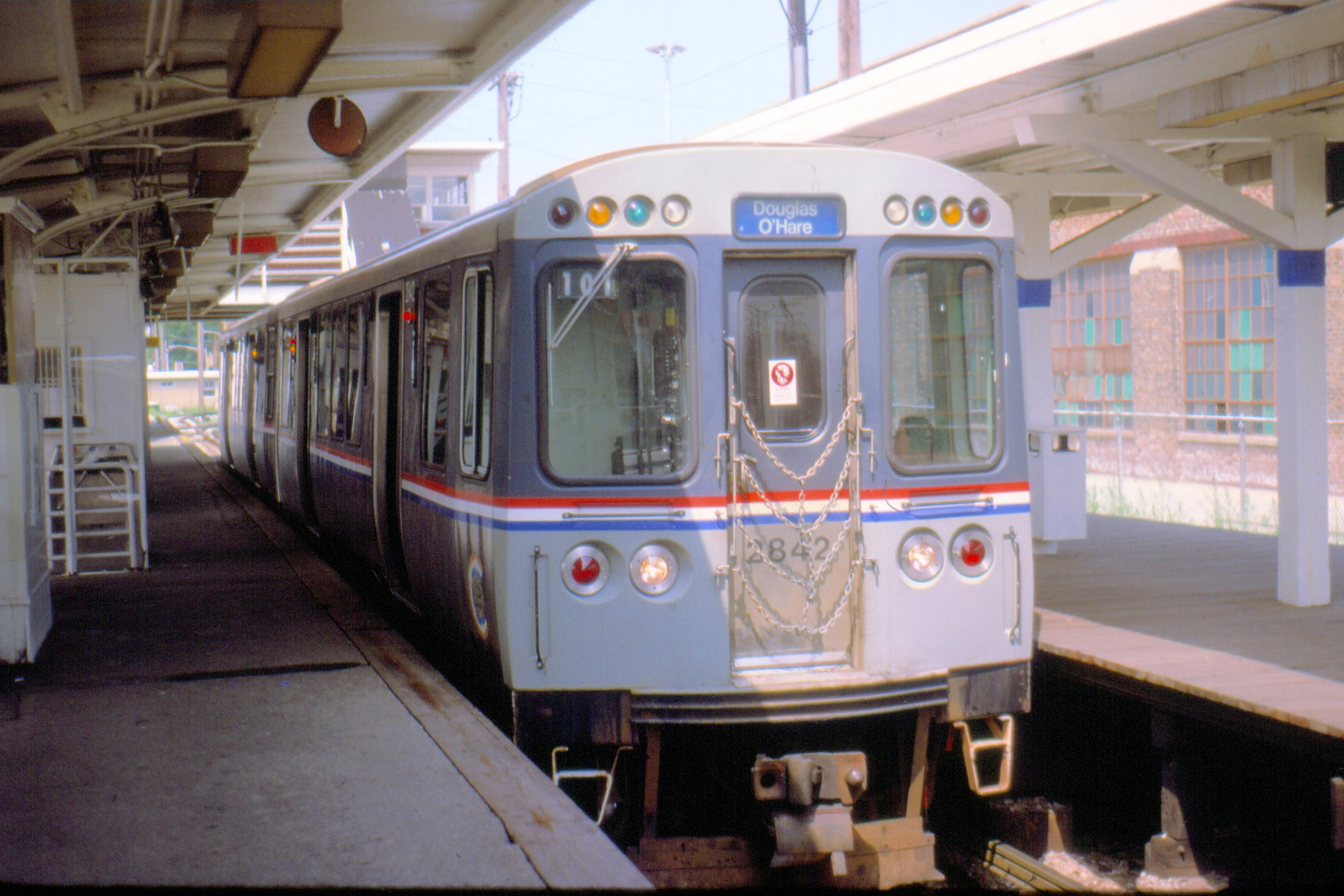
The 2600-series had red, white, and blue on the sides and the Spirit of Chicago logo prior to their rehab.

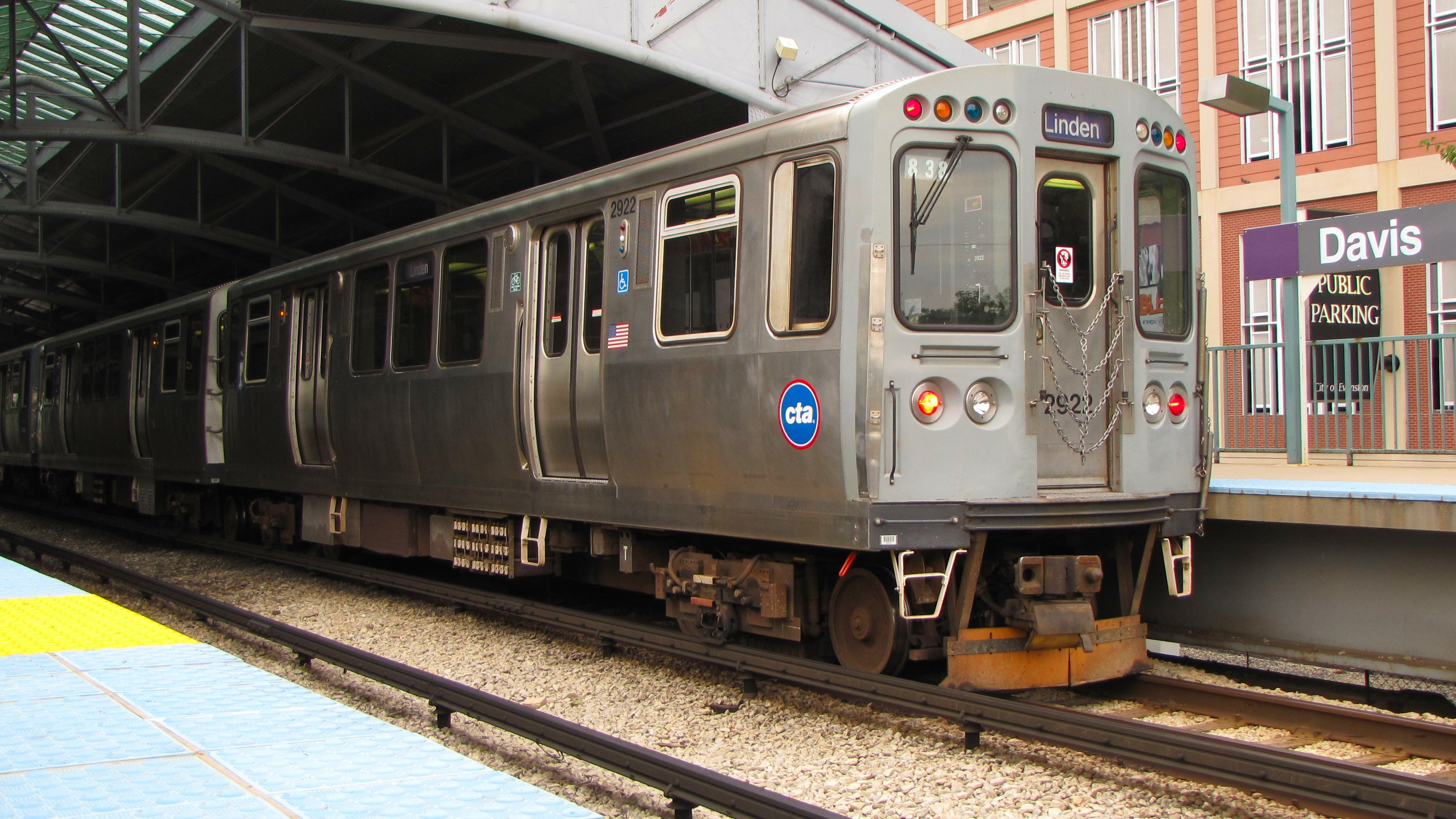
After their rehab, the 2600-series had their colors and the Spirit of Chicago logo removed to better match the rest of the fleet.

The 2600-series cars (numbered 2601–3200) were manufactured by the Budd Company of Philadelphia, Pennsylvania, the same company that made the 2200-series, and first delivered to the CTA in 1981, in time for the upcoming O'Hare Airport extension of the Kennedy Line (now known as the northwestern end of the Blue Line). Originally, an order was made for 300 cars, but this order was later increased to 600 cars, all of which were delivered from 1981 until 1987. They were the last railcars to be built by the Budd Company, later renamed to Transit America. The cars were rebuilt by Alstom of Hornell, New York, from 1999 until 2002. They have few features to differentiate them from the earlier 2400-series cars, but nevertheless remain a mainstay of the "L".

These cars make up most of the Blue Line fleet and all of the Orange Line fleet, and car 3458 (originally car 3032) can be found on the Brown Line. In June 2014, as more 5000-series cars were being delivered, The CTA began to transfer the Red Line's 2600-series cars to the Blue Line due to them being newer than the existing 2600-series Blue Line cars, transferring the Blue Line's older 2600-series cars to the Orange Line as an interim replacement for its 2400-series cars until the Red and Purple Lines are fully equipped with the 5000-series cars.

Budd/Transit America had completed car 3200 on April 3, 1987. Car 3200 was not only the final railcar of the 2600-series order, but was the final railcar to be constructed by Budd/Transit America. Once the order was completed, Budd shut down its railcar business.

The 2600-series cars will be replaced by the new 7000-series cars and 9000-series cars.

=== 3200-series ===
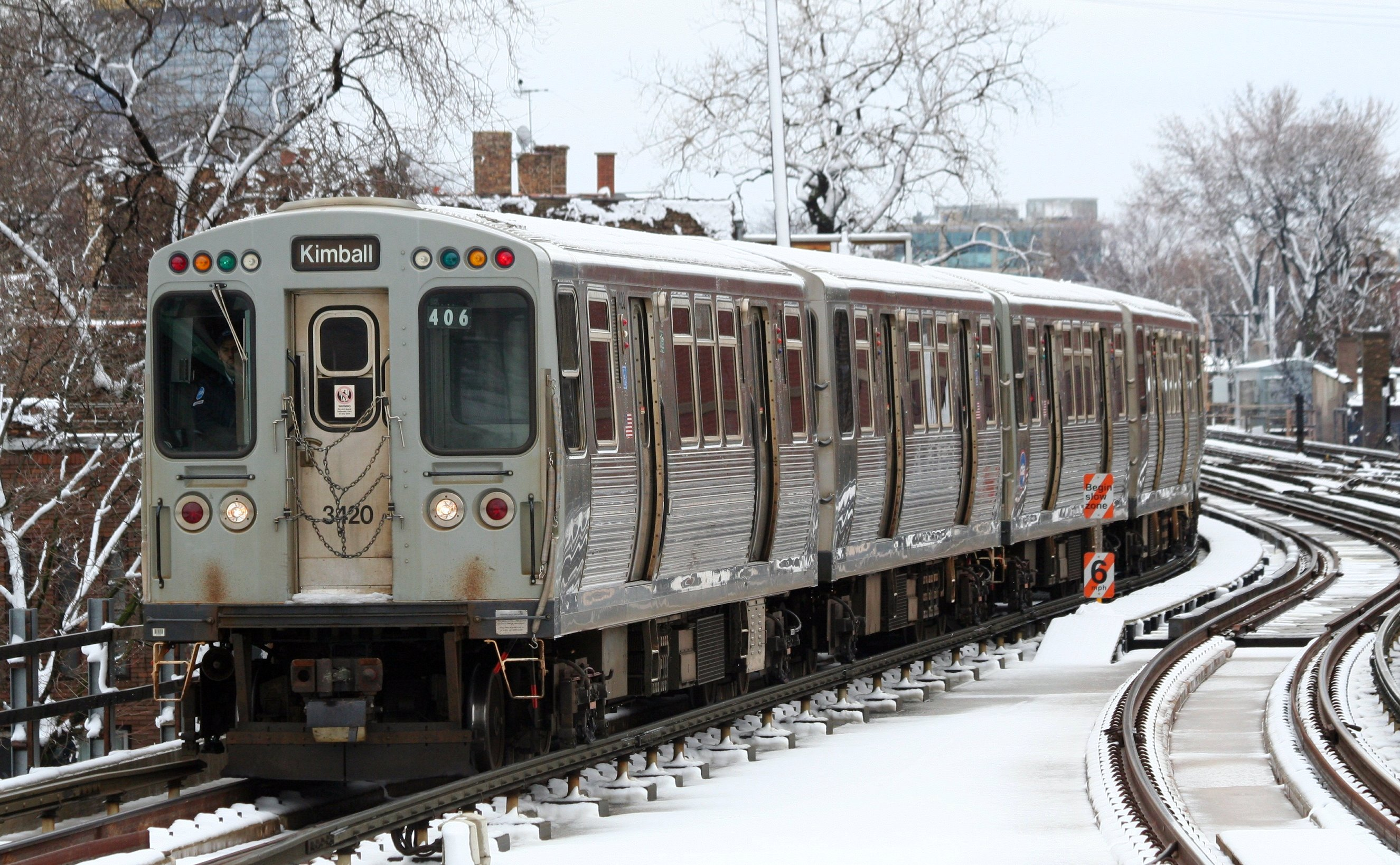
3200-series cars

The 3200-series cars (numbered 3201–3457) were manufactured by Morrison-Knudsen of Hornell, New York, and first delivered to the CTA in 1992. The original order for 256 cars was used for the opening of the Orange Line, which needed new cars when it opened in October 1993. The order was completed in 1994.

The 3200-series contains many innovations over the previous 2600-series. Computers control much of the cab functions and simplify operation for the motorman. Diagnostics are also easier to perform on this series than on previous series. In addition, fluted steel siding is included on these cars for the first time since the 2200-series, in order to reduce graffiti. The series also introduced hopper windows for use in case of air conditioner failure.

Skokie Swift 3200 series railcars, when they still used Pantographs; those cars no longer bear the Pantographs but still have the mounts for them

Cars #3441–3456 were originally equipped with pantographs for use on the Yellow Line, due to its use of overhead catenary between the Skokie shops and Dempster Street. The pantographs on 3451–3456 were removed in the late 1990s when they were reassigned to supplement the Brown Line, while the rest lost their pantographs when the Yellow Line was converted to third rail power in 2004. However, they all still maintain the mounts for the pantographs.

Car 3457 was an additional car built for the purpose of serving as a mate to the 2600-series car 3032, after its mate 3031 had been damaged from a derailment at Wilson station on March 15, 1988. 3032 was renumbered 3458.

The 3200-series cars are currently assigned to the Blue and Brown Lines, composing most of the Brown Line fleet and part of the Blue Line fleet. At various points during their service life a small number were also assigned to the Yellow and Purple Lines.

A mid-life overhaul was completed in 2018 for the 3200-series cars. Plans included replacing the cars' rollsigns with LED destination signs similar to those on the 5000-series, as well as replacing the air conditioning systems and rebuilding the propulsion system, passenger door motors, and the wheel and axle assemblies.

The 3200-series cars would have been replaced by the new 7000-series cars if all options got picked up, instead the 3200-series cars will be replaced by the 9000-series cars.

=== 5000-series ===
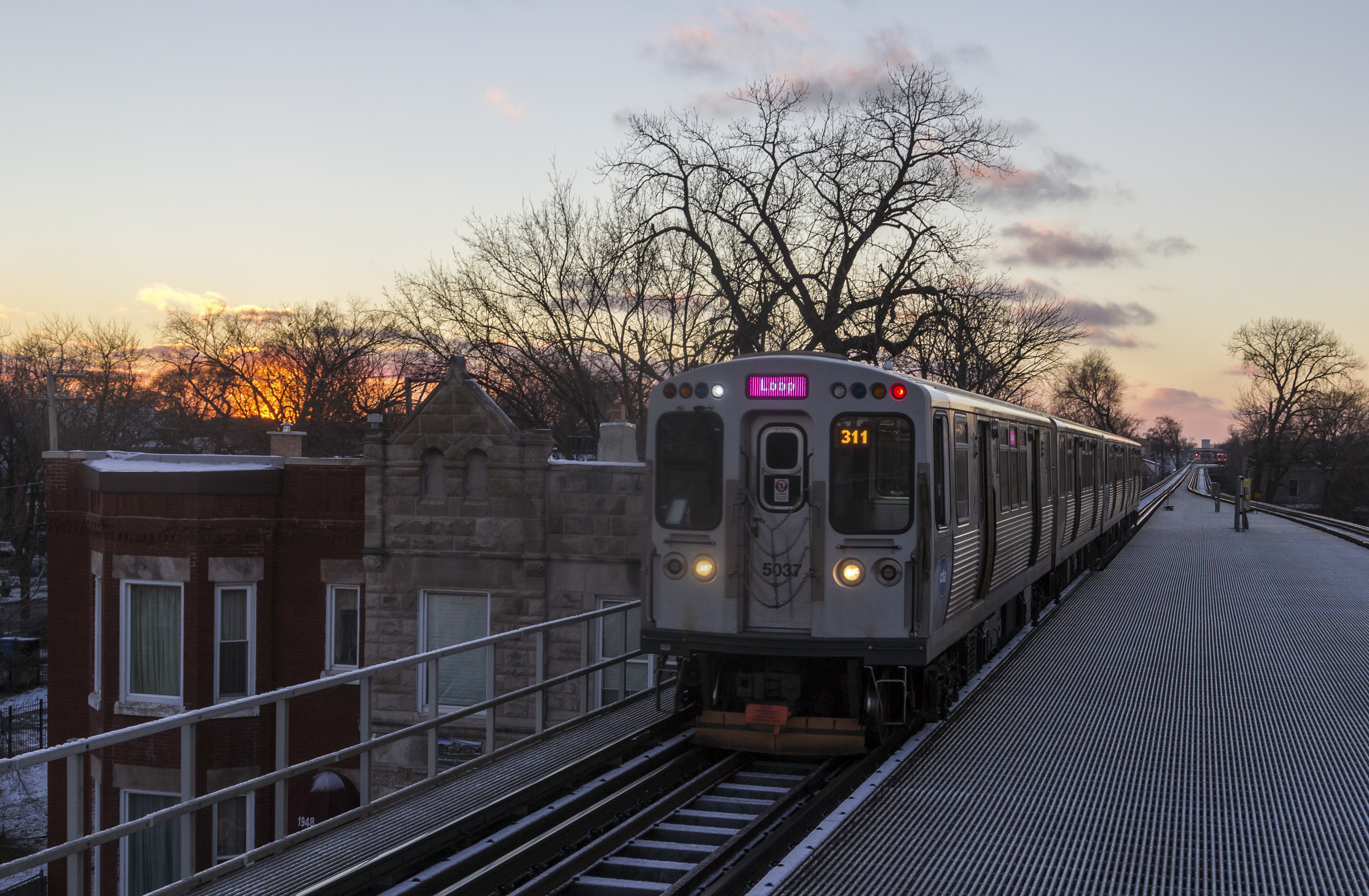
5000-series cars on the Pink Line at North Lawndale

The 5000-series of railcars (numbered 5001–5714) replaced the 2200-series and 2400-series cars. The cars were built by Bombardier of Plattsburgh, New York. The CTA received ten prototype cars in 2009, which underwent testing, and began operating in 2011. The order is for 406 cars, with options for another 308 cars. The Chicago Transit Authority planned to put the first ten cars into in-service testing in mid-April 2010. The first in-service test run was made on April 19.

Originally assumed to be the 3500-series, the order of these cars experienced several delays, including a cancellation of the original bid announcement in 2002.

- Type: 5000-series cars
- Builder: Bombardier Transportation
- Delivery: 2009–2015

==== New features ====
- AC motors
- New LED signs (amber in early production cars, newer cars have multicolor lights for line identification)
- Predominance of longitudinal seating
- The seat fabric will be upgraded to an anti-stain/anti-microbial fabric newly available in the industry.
- Train operators will be able to view live video from any railcar when the passenger intercom unit is activated. This will ensure operators are better able to immediately provide information to first responders.
- Adding cellular modems to railcars will allow the CTA's Control Center to communicate directly with customers in real-time via audio and text messages using speakers and six visual displays in each car.
- In the future, suitably equipped emergency vehicles could also access rail car video through the wireless connection.
- New pulsing white lights and beeping sounds are built into each door assembly, which will activate when the doors are closing.

The 5000-series cars currently make up the entire Pink, Green, Yellow, Purple, and Red Line fleets, along with rush hour only service trains between UIC-Halsted and Jefferson Park for the Blue Line.

=== 7000-series ===
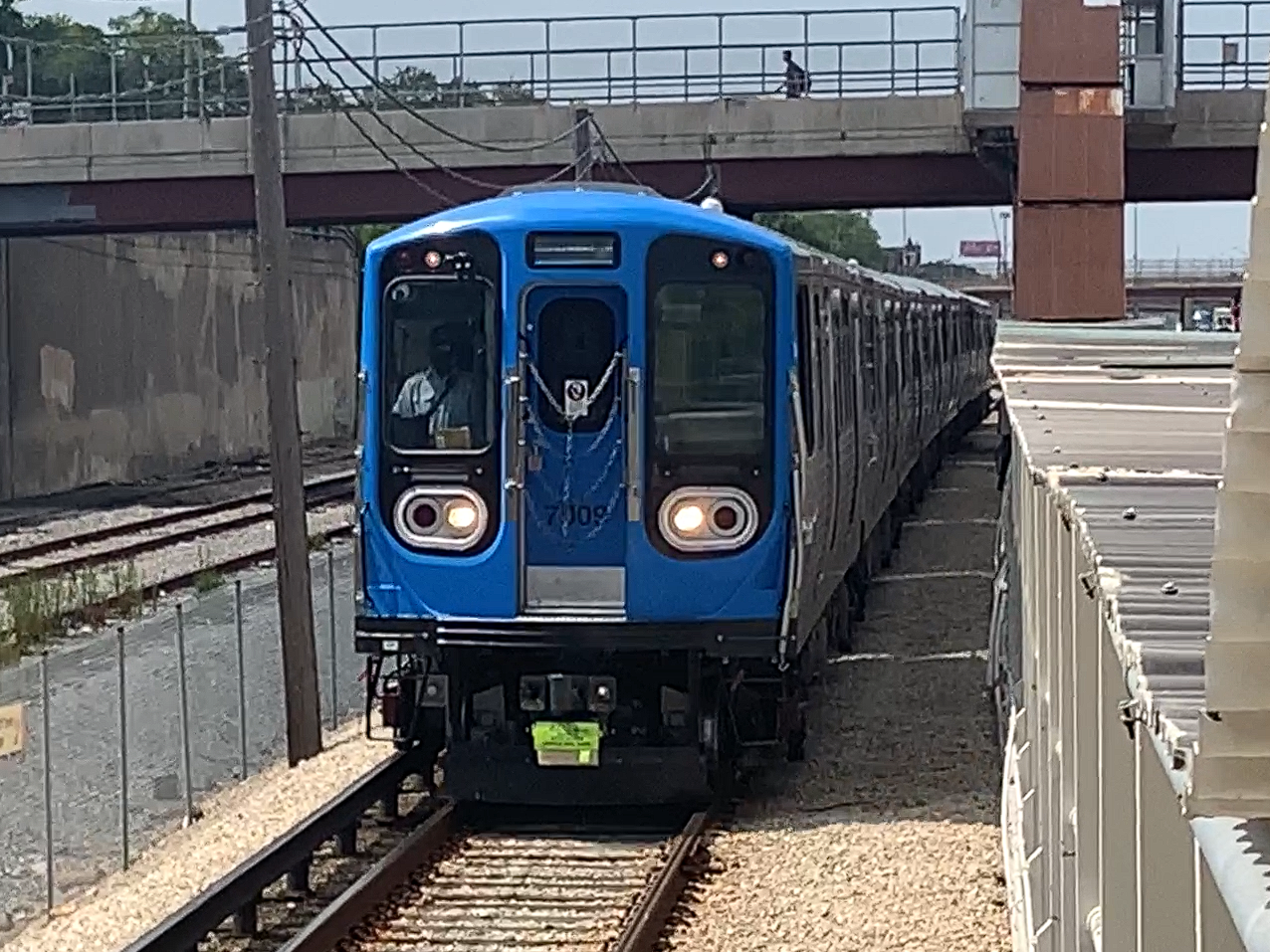
7000-series cars in service on the Blue Line

The new 7000-series cars will replace the 2600-series and 3200-series cars and expand the fleet. The order is for 400 cars only. 10 prototype cars for testing to be delivered in late 2020 and then delivery of the production cars beginning in 2022. On March 9, 2016, the contract was awarded to CRRC Sifang America, with a bid that is $226 million lower than Bombardier's. However, on April 12, 2016, it was announced that Bombardier filed a protest of the decision, alleging that CTA rigged the procurement to give CRRC an unfair advantage. On September 28, 2016, the CTA finalized its decision to award CRRC Sifang America the 7000-series contract.

The cars will be built at a new CRRC Sifang America railcar manufacturing plant at 13535 South Torrence Avenue in Chicago's Hegewisch neighborhood. Construction of the factory began in March 2017, with production to begin at the factory in March 2019. Concerns have been raised over possible malware, cyber attacks, and mass surveillance by the Chinese government. However, the computer and software components and the automatic train control system will be made by U.S. and Canadian firms.

The 7000-series tested tracks in December 2019. The 7000-series began testing in October 2020, and will make up the entire Blue Line fleet. In June 2019, production began on the 7000-series cars. In service testing began on the Blue line on April 21, 2021. Delivery of the production cars began in June 2022. In August 2022, the 7000-series production cars began service on the Blue Line. As of November 2025, the CTA plans to purchase the full 846 railcar option.

== Upcoming ==
=== 9000-series ===
On May 5, 2023, the CTA announced it had received funding to "begin planning and designing for the future procurement of its next generation of railcars - the 9000-series. Very little information is available at this time, and it is unclear if the 9000-series will be utilized to replace the 3200-series cars in addition to the remainder of the 2600-series cars. A determining factor will be if the CTA exercises any options for orders of 7000-series cars beyond the base order.

== See also ==
- G series (Toronto subway) – influenced by the 6000 series
