= Kimball Yard =

Chicago Transit Authority rail yard

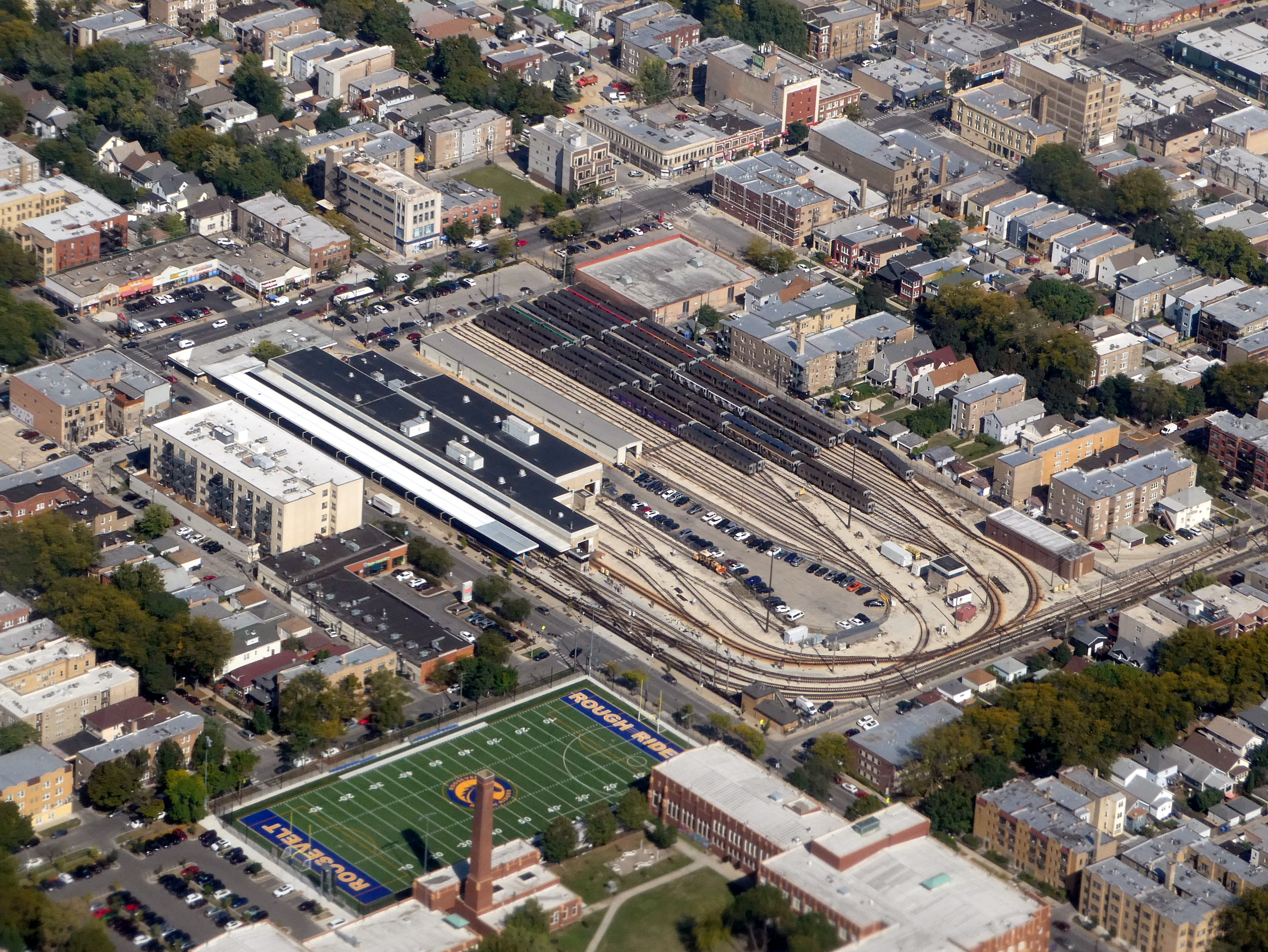
- Aerial view of the yard and the adjacent Kimball station, 2024
- Interactive map of Kimball Yard

Location
- Location: 3365 W. Lawrence Avenue, Chicago, Illinois
- Coordinates: 41°58′04″N 87°42′44″W

Characteristics
- Owner: Chicago Transit Authority
- Type: Rapid transit
- Rolling stock: 2600-series and 3200-series
- Routes served: Brown

History
- Opened: 1908; 118 years ago

The Kimball Yard is a CTA rail yard in the Albany Park neighborhood on the Northwest side of Chicago, Illinois, United States, which stores cars for the Brown Line of the Chicago Transit Authority. Currently, 2600-series and 3200-series railcars are stored here. It is adjacent to Kimball station. Because of its limited size, some morning rush hour Brown Line trains borrow rolling stock from Midway Yard, running as a combined service spanning the Orange Line and Brown Line.
