= Rosemont Yard =

Chicago "L" rail yard

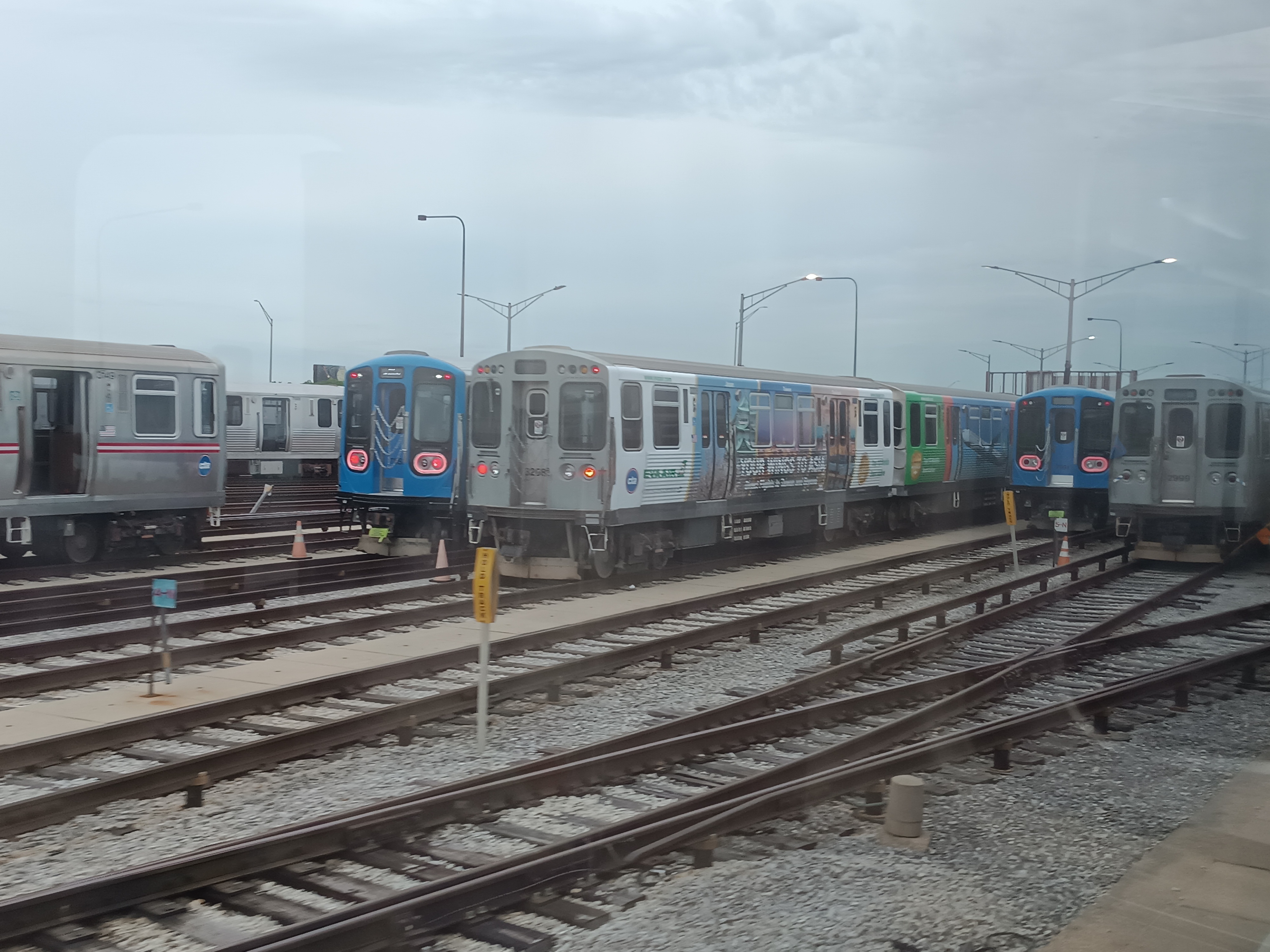
Rosemont Yard in 2024 with 3200-series and 7000-series trains

The Rosemont Yard is a CTA rail yard in Rosemont, Illinois, USA, which stores cars from the Blue Line of the Chicago Transit Authority. As of 2025, 2600-series, 3200-series and 7000-series railcars are stored here. It is adjacent to Rosemont station.
