= Desplaines Yard =

Chicago "L" rail yard

The Desplaines Yard (also known as the Forest Park Yard) is a CTA rail yard in Forest Park, Illinois which stores cars for the Blue Line of the Chicago Transit Authority. Currently, 2600-series, 3200-series and 7000-series railcars are stored here. It is adjacent to Forest Park station.
