= 7000-series (CTA) =

Rapid transit rail car for Chicago

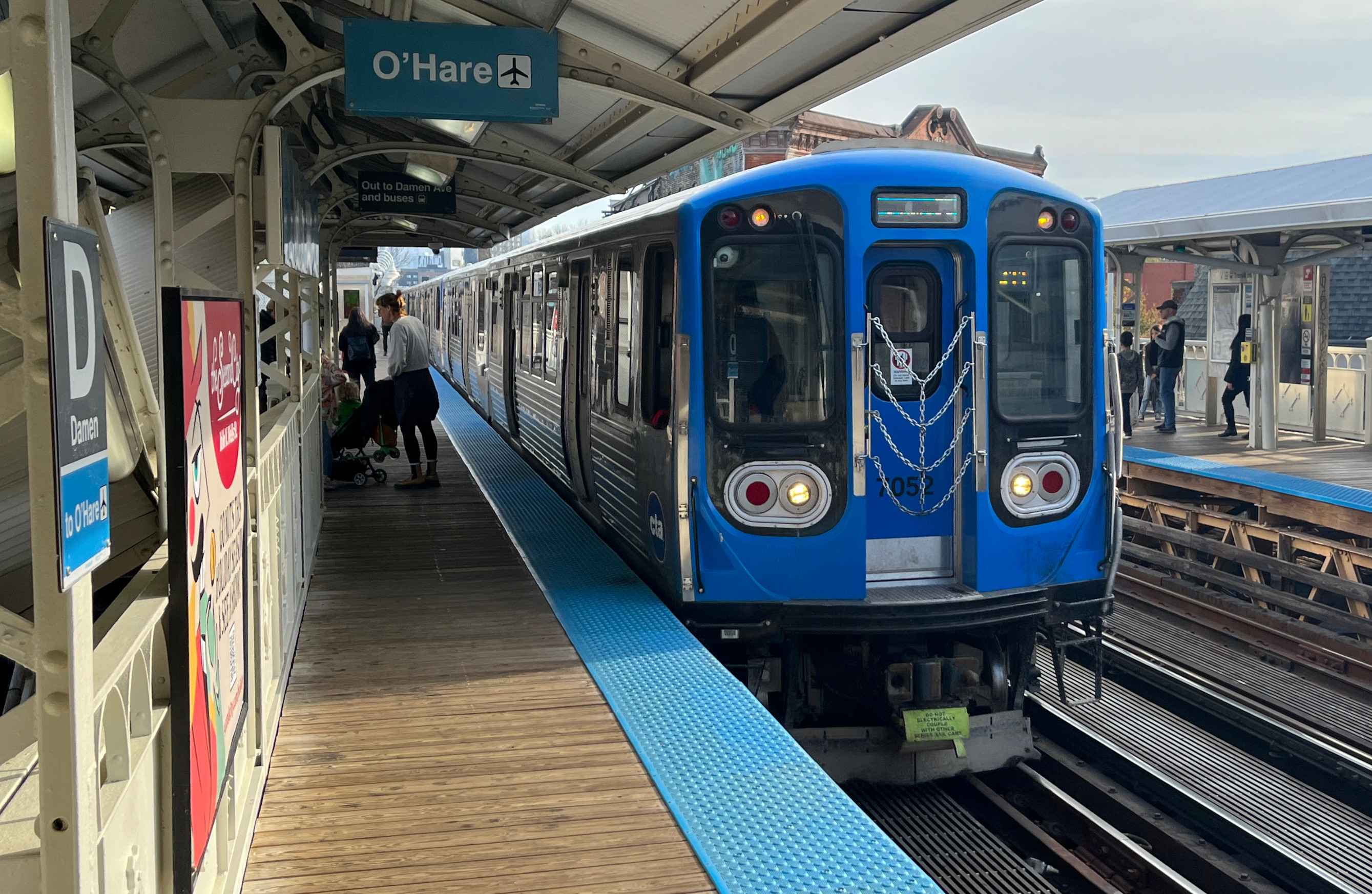
- A 7000-series train at Damen station on the Blue Line

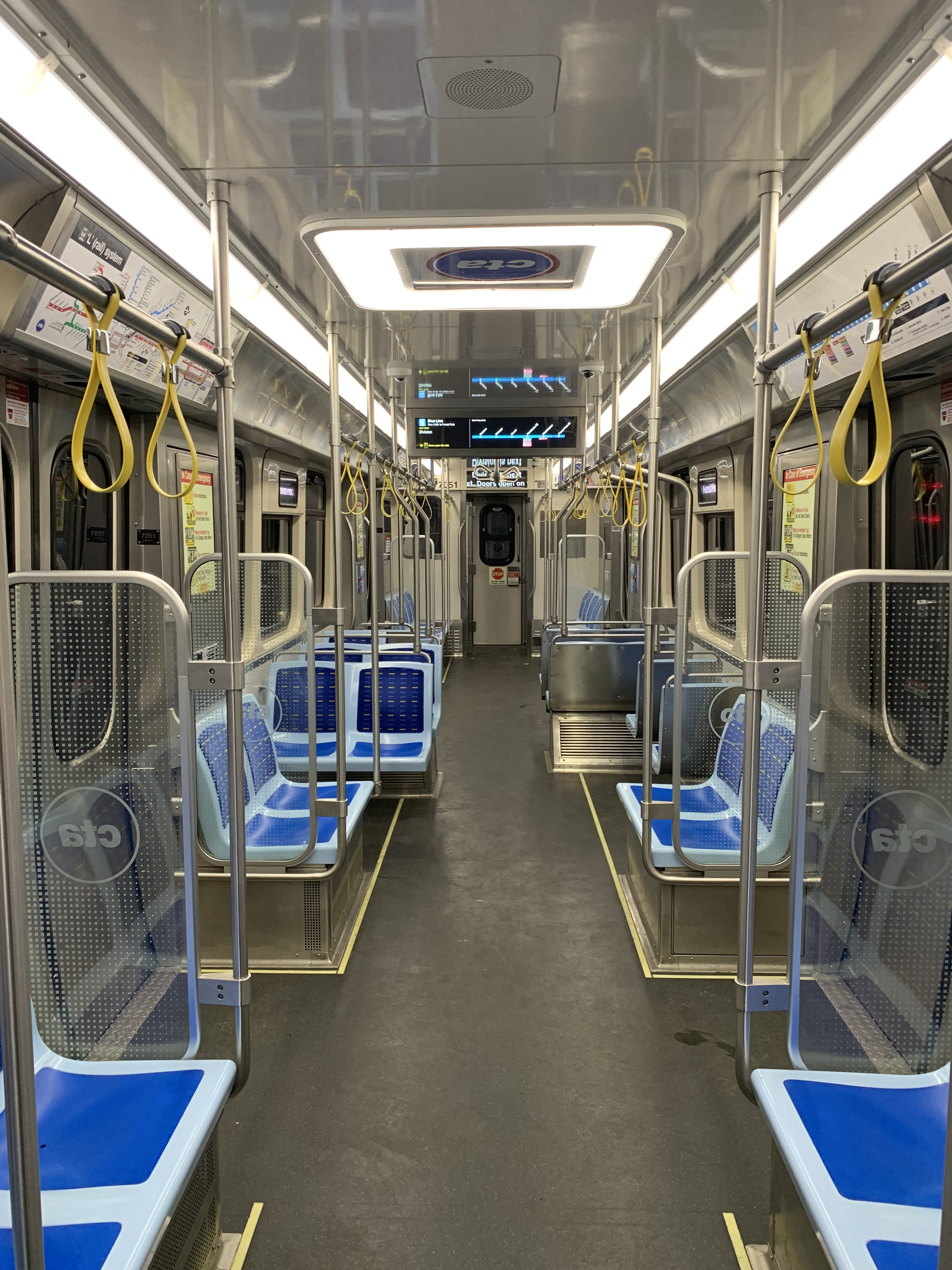
- Inside a 7000-series rail car
- In service: 2021–present
- Manufacturer: CRRC Sifang America
- Built at: CRRC Plant, Chicago, Illinois
- Replaced: 2600-series (base order); 3200-series (options if picked up)
- Constructed: 2019–present
- Entered service: 2021
- Number under construction: 124 remaining (base order); 570 remaining (total if options are picked up)
- Number built: 276
- Number in service: 268
- Formation: Married-pair
- Fleet numbers: 7001–7400 (base order); 7401–7846 (options if picked up)
- Capacity: 37 to 38 (seated)
- Operator: Chicago Transit Authority
- Depots: Desplaines Yard; Rosemont Yard
- Line served: Blue Line

Specifications
- Car body construction: Stainless steel with fiberglass end bonnets
- Car length: 48 ft (14.63 m)
- Width: 9 ft 4 in (2.84 m)
- Height: 12 ft (3.66 m)
- Doors: 2 × 2 per car
- Maximum speed: Design: 70 mph (110 km/h); Service: 55 mph (89 km/h)
- Traction system: Siemens IGBT–VVVF
- Traction motors: Siemens 3-phase AC induction motor
- Auxiliaries: KB Powertech Corp. USA
- Electric systems: Third rail, 600 V DC
- Current collection: Contact shoe
- UIC classification: Bo′Bo′+Bo′Bo′
- AAR wheel arrangement: B-B+B-B
- Bogies: Siemens
- Braking systems: WABTec regenerative and hydraulic
- Safety system: Siemens ATC/ATO
- Track gauge: 4 ft 8 1/2 in (1,435 mm) standard gauge

The 7000-series of rail cars was ordered by the Chicago Transit Authority (CTA) for the Chicago "L". The base order is for 400 cars and will be used to replace the 1980s-vintage 2600-series cars, currently assigned to the Blue, Brown, and Orange Lines. Including all options, which is a total of 846 cars, the order will cost $1.3 billion.

Prototypes for testing were delivered in August 2020. Full production cars were delivered starting in June 2022. The cost per car is approximately $1.58 million.

Ten cars in the 7000-series began testing revenue service on April 21, 2021.

== Features ==
Each 7000-series rail car features 37 to 38 seats, and is a hybrid of the 3200-series and 5000-series. The 7000-series train cars are equipped with AC propulsion; interior security cameras, interior readouts, interior GPS maps, glow-in-the-dark evacuation signs, operator-controlled ventilation systems. AC propulsion allows for smoother acceleration, lower operational costs, less wear and tear, and greater energy efficiency. In particular, AC propulsion can take advantage of regenerative braking, meaning the train returns excess energy to the third rail as it slows down. An improved suspension system offers passengers a smoother ride. LED screens give real-time transit information to passengers. LCD screens, installed near the doors, display real-time surveillance footage of riders in order to deter crime.

In the 7000-series, the design and arrangement of seats were modified to improve ergonomics and increase leg room. In addition, because the seats are attached to the side of the train using a diagonal pole rather than a vertical one to the floor, cleaning the train will be easier. However, seats are still a combination of fabric and plastic. Compared to the 5000-series, there are more front and back-facing seats. Enhanced air conditioning circulates air more efficiently during hot summer days. Laser sensors above the doors counts the number of passengers, allowing the CTA to track passenger volumes and change its schedules accordingly. Door sensors also help the trains adjust to the heights of station platforms.

== Contracting and production ==
On February 20, 2016, two finalists were announced for the contract—Canada's Bombardier Transportation and China's CRRC Sifang America. Bombardier was the manufacturer of the previous 5000-series cars. On March 9, 2016, the contract was awarded to CRRC Sifang America, with a bid that is $226 million lower than Bombardier's. However, on April 11, 2016, Bombardier filed a protest of the award, alleging that CTA rigged the procurement to give CRRC an unfair advantage. On September 28, 2016, the CTA finalized its decision to make CRRC Sifang America the manufacturer of the 7000-series cars.

The cars are being built at a new CRRC Sifang America rail car manufacturing plant at 13535 South Torrence Avenue in Chicago's Hegewisch neighborhood. Construction of the factory began in March 2017, with production to start at the factory in March 2019. CRRC invested $100 million on constructing the plant and $7.2 million on training its workforce of about 170 people. This is the first time in more than 50 years CTA rail cars are manufactured in Chicago. In June 2019, production began on the 7000-series cars. The rail cars will be manufactured over a period of more than 10 years. CRRC said it planned to use its Chicago factory to produce rapid transit rail cars for San Francisco and bi-level coach cars for Metra, a commuter rail operator serving Chicago metropolitan area, if it won contracts for these. Because CRRC was the only bidder, Metra once again asked competitors to present their proposals. However, in January 2021, Metra board approved Alstom as the builder for new bi-level coaches. CRRC had also placed bids for to produce rail cars for the Long Island Rail Road in New York and the Washington Metro, but ultimately lost these contracts to Kawasaki and Hitachi Rail, respectively.

The contract required a test set to be delivered by October 2019. If the rail cars proved to be acceptable, then full production cars would be delivered starting in October 2020, at a rate of 10 cars per month. In December 2019, a set was seen testing at the facility. Prototypes for testing would be delivered in August 2020 and then the base order would be delivered by 2027.

In August 2020, the first 7000-series rail cars arrived in Skokie Shops by semi truck. Testing began in October. The first 10 cars began testing in passenger service on April 21, 2021. In June 2022, delivery of the production cars began. In August 2022, the 7000-series production rail cars began service.

The CTA's 2025 budget allocates funds to increase the rate of production of the 7000-series.

=== CRRC controversy ===
By law, 69% of each rail car must be US-sourced. Car shells are manufactured in China, transported by ships to Los Angeles or Houston, and then by trucks to Chicago to be completed at the CRRC Sifang America plant. CRRC is a Chinese state-owned enterprise; concerns have been raised over possible malware, cyber attacks, and mass surveillance by the Chinese government. However, the computer and software components and the automatic train control system will be made by American and Canadian firms. Of the 24 suppliers to the project, 19 have business headquarters in the U.S., and 16 of which have previously done business with the CTA. Moreover, the CTA reserves to right to supervise production and to halt the process if it sees fit. There will be no payments until the cars are received. Late deliveries will result in a fine of $300 per car per day.

Although CRRC has also been producing rapid transit trains for Boston, CTA Vice President for Purchasing Ellen McCormack said she was unsuccessful in obtaining information on the rail cars delivered to the Massachusetts Bay Transportation Authority.

In mid-2019, the United States Congress considered banning federal dollars from being spent on Chinese buses and trains due to concerns about unfair competition from state-sponsored firms, sabotage, and espionage. This is not a stand-alone bill but is rather part of a national security bill passed by the House of Representatives. The Senate was considering the same proposal, but the bill died in committee. This measure has bipartisan support. It would prevent the company from taking further orders in the American market, but would not affect CRRC's current contract with the CTA.

== See also ==
- MPM-10 (Montreal Metro)
- R211 (New York City Subway car)
- Toronto Rocket
- 8000 series (Washington Metro)
