= 3200-series (CTA) =

Class of Chicago 'L' rail car

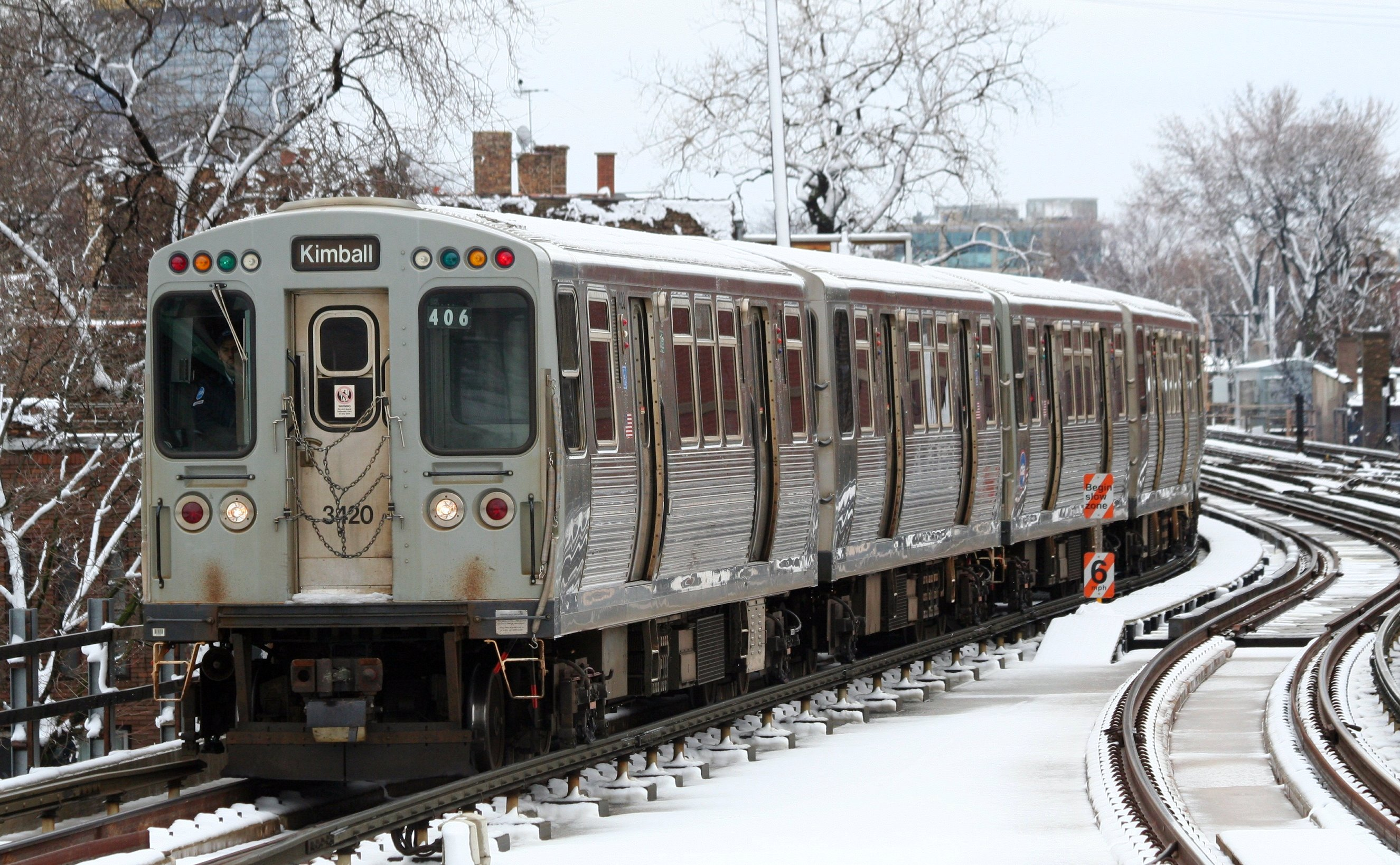
- 3200-series cars on the Brown Line pre-rehab

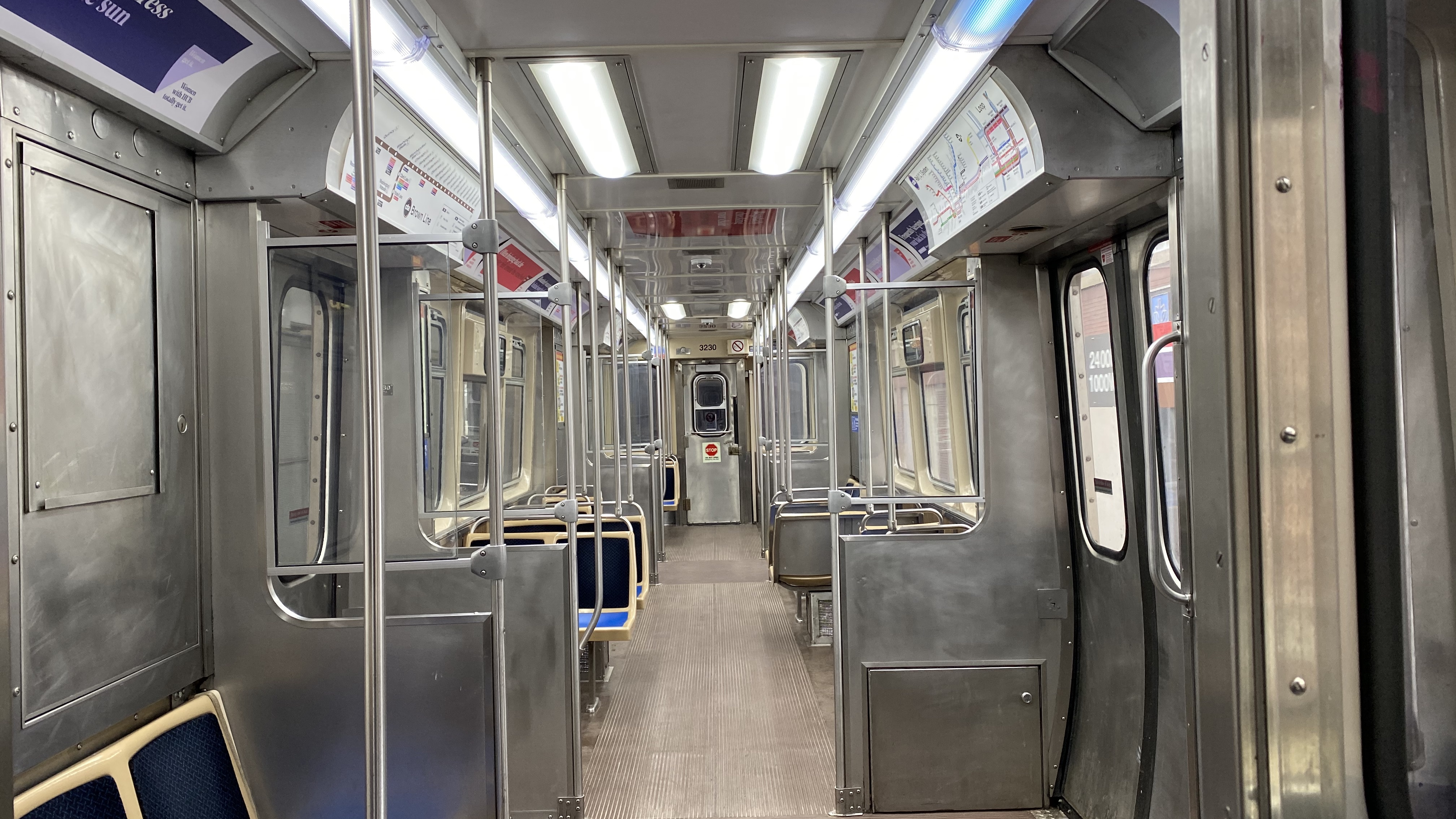
- Interior of a 3200-series car on the Brown Line
- In service: August 27, 1992 – present
- Manufacturer: Morrison-Knudsen
- Built at: Morrison-Knudsen Plant, Hornell, New York
- Family name: High Performance
- Replaced: 6000-series, 1–50 series, 2000-series
- Constructed: 1992–1994
- Entered service: 1992
- Refurbished: 2015–2018, Skokie Shops, Skokie, Illinois
- Number built: 257
- Number in service: 255
- Successor: 7000-series (if all options included), 9000-series (if some 7000-series options are not picked up)
- Formation: Married pair
- Fleet numbers: 3201–3457
- Capacity: 39 seated (35 seated cars 3321-26)
- Operator: Chicago Transit Authority
- Depots: Desplaines Yard; Kimball Yard; Rosemont Yard
- Lines served: Blue Line; Brown Line

Specifications
- Car body construction: Stainless steel with fiberglass end bonnets
- Car length: 48 ft (14.63 m)
- Width: 9 ft 4 in (2.84 m)
- Height: 12 ft (3.66 m)
- Doors: 4 per car
- Maximum speed: Design: 70 mph (110 km/h); Service: 55 mph (89 km/h)
- Weight: 54,290 lb (24,630 kg)
- Traction motors: 4 × GE 1262A4 110 hp (82 kW) DC motor
- Power output: 440 hp (330 kW)
- Electric systems: Third rail, 600 V DC
- Current collection: Contact shoe
- Braking systems: Regenerative and disc brakes
- Track gauge: 4 ft 8 1/2 in (1,435 mm) standard gauge

The 3200-series (numbered 3201–3457) is a series of 'L' cars built between 1992 and 1994 by Morrison-Knudsen of Hornell, New York, with body shells built by Brazilian subcontractor Mafersa. 257 cars were built.

The 3200-series was the last of five series of Chicago "L" cars known as the High Performance Family and the last railcars ordered for the Chicago Transit Authority that use direct current motors. All subsequent train orders are using alternating current motors.

The original order for 256 cars was used for the opening of the Orange Line, which needed new cars when it opened in October 1993. The order was completed in 1994. The 3200-series contains many innovations over the previous 2600-series, including solid state computerized (microprocessor) control for much of the cab functions and traction system. Diagnostics are also easier to perform on this series than on previous series. In addition, fluted steel siding is included on these cars for the first time since the 2200-series, in order to reduce graffiti. The series also introduced hopper windows for use in case of air conditioner failure.

Cars 3441-3456 were originally equipped with pantographs for use on the Yellow Line, which was powered by overhead lines until 2004. The pantographs on 3451-3456 were removed in the late 1990s when they were reassigned to supplement the Brown Line, while the rest lost their pantographs when the Yellow Line was converted to third rail power in 2004.

Car 3457 was an additional car built for the purpose of serving as a mate to the 2600-series car 3032, after its mate 3031 had been damaged from a derailment at Wilson on March 15, 1988. 3032 was renumbered 3458. The pair currently runs on the Brown Line, which is currently equipped with both 2600-series and 3200-series cars.

The 3200-series cars are currently assigned to the Blue and Brown Lines. At various points during their service life a small number were also assigned to the Yellow and Purple Lines. In late 2018, some of the 3200-series cars were reassigned from the Brown and Orange Lines to the Blue Line, with the 2600-series cars from the Blue Line replacing some 3200-series cars from the Orange Line. These cars entered service on the Blue Line on September 17, 2018, and were removed from service from the Orange Line in October 2018.

== Mid-life overhaul ==
In May 2014, two trainsets (one on the Brown Line and one on the Orange Line) were retrofitted with LED destination signs similar to those on the 5000-series cars as a project for a mid-life overhaul for the cars. The overhaul plans were approved on August 14, 2014. In addition to new LED destination signs, new LED run number boxes, including car 3458, new air conditioning systems are being installed, and the propulsion systems, passenger door motors, and wheel and axle assemblies were rebuilt. The 3200-series rehabilitation began in 2015 and was completed in 2018. In Summer 2015, rehabbed Brown Line cars began appearing in service.

== Retirement ==
If options were picked up, the 3200-series cars currently in service were expected to be replaced by the new 7000-series cars.
