= 1977 Chicago Loop derailment =

Deadly crash of a rapid transit train in Chicago, Illinois

Coordinates: 41.8855°N 87.6262°W

- Photo of the derailment, taken from the window of a nearby building, showing flipped 2200-series cars below the rail structure

Details
- Date: February 4, 1977; 49 years ago 5:25 pm
- Location: Chicago, Illinois
- Country: United States
- Line: The Loop, Ravenswood & Lake-Dan Ryan lines
- Operator: Chicago Transit Authority
- Incident type: Collision
- Cause: Driver error

Statistics
- Trains: 2
- Deaths: 11
- Injured: 180+

The 1977 Chicago Loop derailment occurred on February 4, 1977, when a Chicago Transit Authority elevated train rear-ended another on the northeast corner of the Loop at Wabash Avenue and Lake Street during the evening rush hour. The collision forced the first four cars of the rear train off the elevated tracks, killing 11 people and injuring at least 268 as the cars fell onto the street below.

== Infrastructure layout ==
"The Loop" not only refers to Chicago's central business district, which is known as the Chicago Loop, but also a rectangular pattern formed by the city's elevated trains. Some trains entering the Loop do a complete circuit around the entire rectangular "loop", and after turning around all four corners, leave on the same path they came from. Other routes enter the Loop, turning only two of the corners, and then leave on a different route. Further complicating this is the fact that some trains' routes follow a clockwise pattern around the Loop, but others go counter-clockwise.

In 1977, when the crash occurred, four lines were operating on the Loop, each in a different direction. The Ravenswood Line (current Brown Line) operated counter-clockwise around the outer track, while the Evanston Express (current Purple Line) and Loop Shuttle operated clockwise opposite from the Ravenswood trains on the inner track. The Lake–Dan Ryan Line (which now forms parts of the modern-day Green Line and Red Line) operated in both directions, but only using the Lake and Wabash legs of the Loop.

Earlier in the day of the accident, a switching issue forced dispatchers to reroute the Evanston Express to run counter-clockwise around the Loop instead of its normal clockwise route. This put it on the tracks normally used by the Ravenswood and westbound Lake–Dan Ryan trains. Because of congestion caused by this abnormal track sharing, the Ravenswood train would be required to stop short, waiting for the rerouted Evanston Express to clear before proceeding. Additionally, this delay meant that the Ravenswood was still in place when the Lake–Dan Ryan train arrived on these tracks, and it too was required to stop and wait for the Ravenswood to clear the track before proceeding.

== Collision ==
At about 5:25 p.m., a Ravenswood train was waiting on the tracks, just past the northeast turn, waiting for the Evanston Express to clear the State/Lake platform. However, the Lake–Dan Ryan train did not stop as it approached the Ravenswood train. The Lake-Dan Ryan train proceeded against both track and cab signals and struck the back of the Ravenswood train. This impact was at 10 miles per hour (16 km/h), as the train had only started off a few seconds earlier and was still halfway through pulling out of Randolph/Wabash. Passengers on the train reported the impact as nothing more than a "quiet thump."

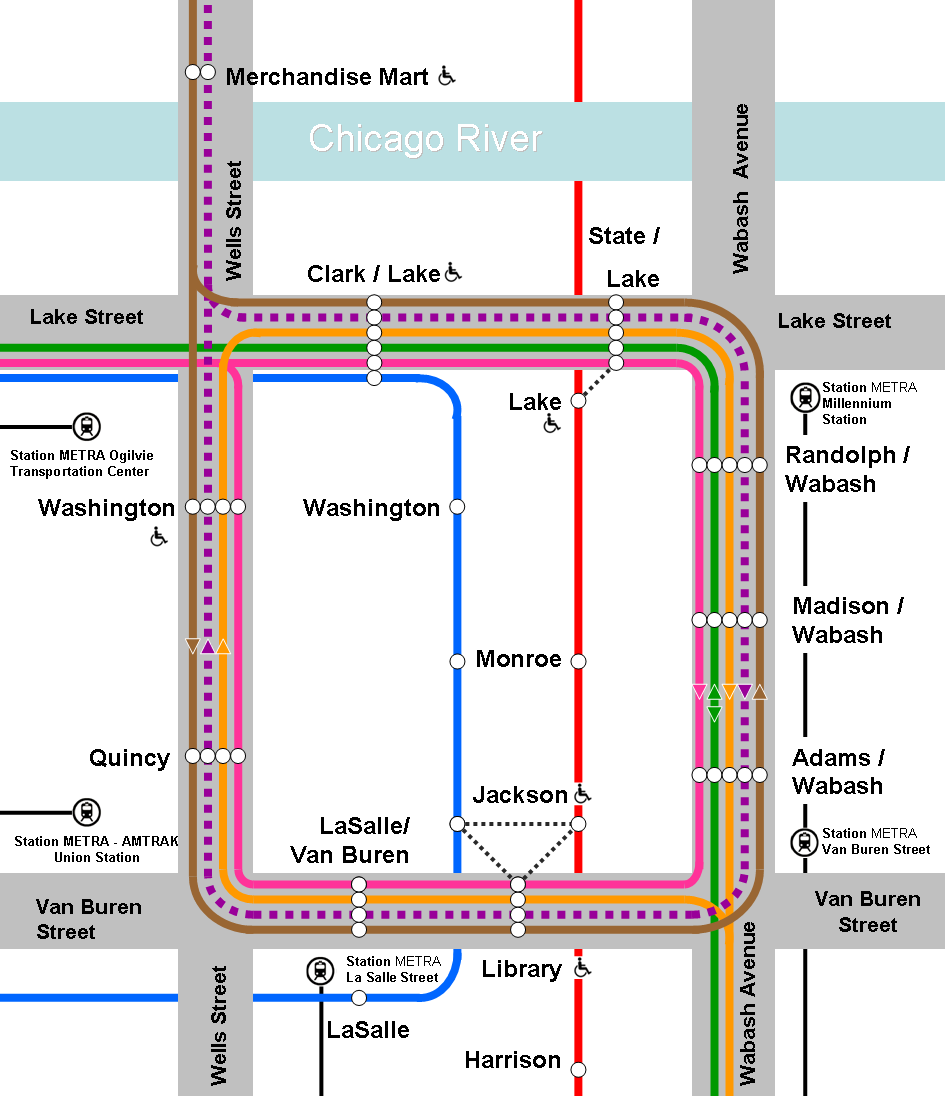
"The Loop" refers to the rectangular routes of Chicago's elevated trains. The accident occurred on the northeast corner.

However, after the impact motorman Stephan A. Martin continued to apply traction power. This resulted in the rear cars continuing to push forwards, pinning the front of the train against the waiting Ravenswood on the right-angle turn of the track. With the front Lake–Dan Ryan train unable to move forward, the pressure from behind caused the coupling bar between the first two cars to bend and the coupled ends of those two cars to be pushed in the air. As motor power continued to be applied, the first three cars (two Budd 2200 units and a single Pullman-Standard 2000) were pushed further upwards, until they jackknifed and fell off the tracks. The second and third cars fell to the street below, while the first car fell onto a track support structure. The fourth car (another 2000 connected to the third car), pulled forward by the third, was derailed and dangled between the track edge and surface street. The last four cars remained on the track and still in Randolph/Wabash station.

== Investigation and CTA response ==
While "traces of THC" were found in one urine sample, "the extent to which [Martin] may have been under the influence of cannabis at the time of the accident could not be determined by tests." Four joints were found in the motormans bag. Subsequent investigation revealed that Martin had a poor safety record, including reading while operating the train, and was responsible for an earlier derailment, and he had a tendency to talk to passengers while driving the train. It is theorized that having made the normal station stop before the curve, Martin had caused the restrictive cab signal caused by the train ahead to be overridden. Distracted, he then left the station at under 15 miles per hour (24 km/h), which was slow enough not to trigger the automatic control, and then after the initial collision, panic or inertia caused him to move the Cineston controller forward resulting in the derailment.

Martin was fired six months after the accident, with the official investigation later faulting him for the derailment.

As a result of the accident, the CTA forbade motormen to proceed past a red signal "on sight" without first getting permission from the Control Center. The Evanston Express was re-routed to the inner loop from the outer loop and an iron beam was added to the elevated structure to ensure that a carriage could not fall off the elevated structure. 2200 units 2289-2290 and 2000 units 2043-2044 were wrecked beyond repair and scrapped: all other trains involved were repaired and returned to service.
