= 1969 in rail transport =

This article lists events related to rail transport that occurred in 1969.

== Events ==
=== January events ===
- January 1
  - As ordered by court, Penn Central takes over the assets and operations of the bankrupt New York, New Haven and Hartford ("New Haven") for $22 million; new passenger timetables over the new PC New Haven Region take effect February 2.
  - The Pullman Company is dissolved, having ceased to operate sleeping car services in the United States.

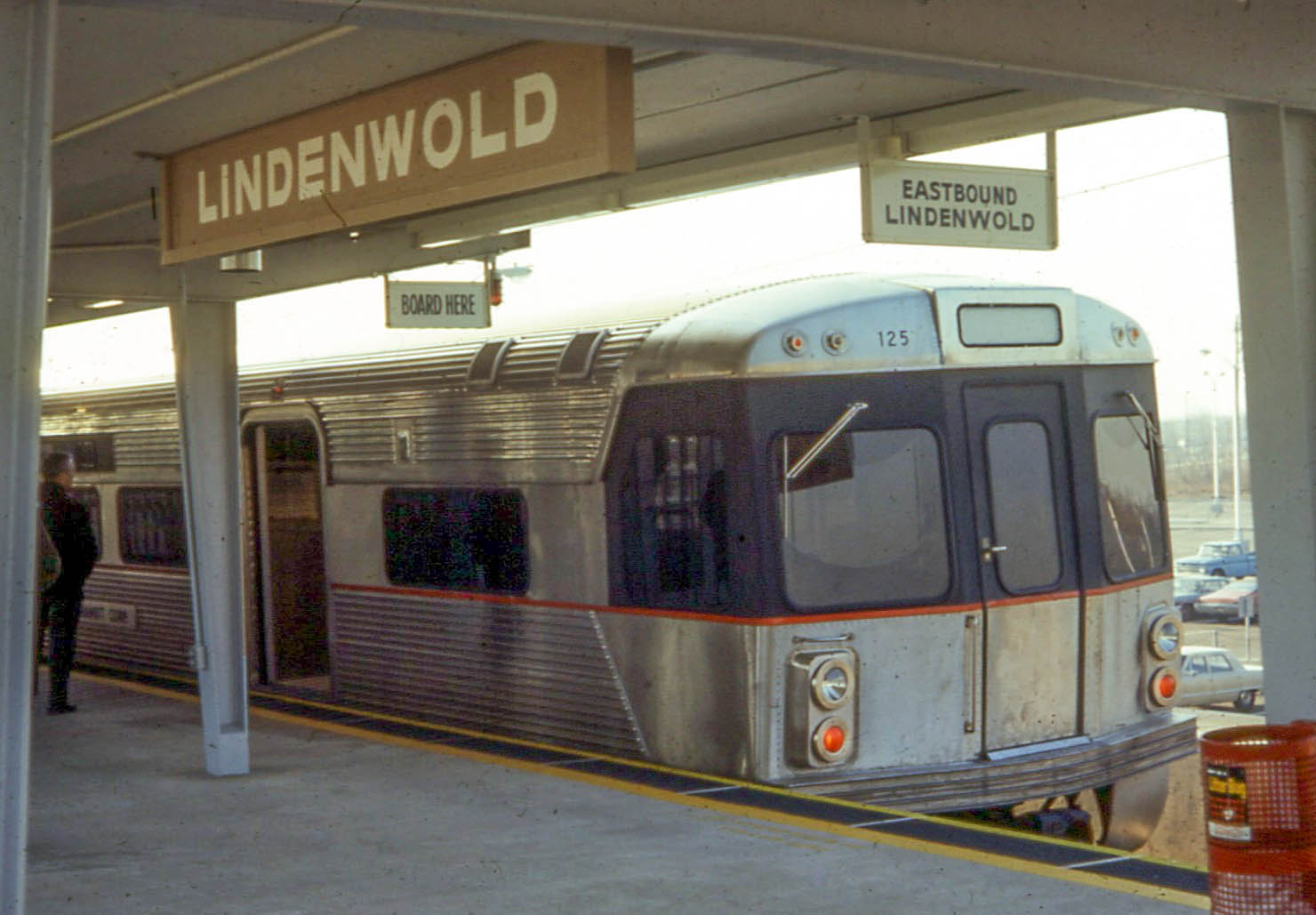
A PATCO Speedline train on the first day of service at Lindenwold station

- January 4 – The PATCO Hi-Speedline, in southeastern Pennsylvania, opens.
- January 5 – Last trains over the Waverley Route from Edinburgh in Scotland to Carlisle in England.

=== February events ===
- February 16 – Căile Ferate Române, in Romania, completes its systemwide electrification project.

=== March events ===
- March 7 – The Victoria line of the London Underground is formally opened, between Warren Street and Victoria, by the Queen.

=== April events ===
- April 5 – The South Devon Railway at Buckfastleigh in England, reopens as a preserved steam railway, the Dart Valley Railway.

=== May events ===
- May 5 – The Lewes-Uckfield (or Wealden Line) railway line is closed under British Rail and Richard Beeching's Beeching Axe in East Sussex, England.
- May 6 – The Chicago Transit Authority's Englewood 'L' service is extended to the new Ashland/63rd Terminal, replacing the former Loomis terminal.
- May 7 – A northbound passenger train from London, England, bound for Aberdeen, Scotland, takes the curve in Morpeth too quickly and derails in the Morpeth rail crash (6 killed).
- May – Union Pacific Railroad takes delivery of General Motors Electro-Motive Division EMD DDA40X, the most powerful and largest diesel locomotive to date.

=== June events ===
- June – Seaboard Coast Line Railroad, on the United States Atlantic coast, discontinues the Silver Comet passenger train service.
- June 1 – The Catalan Talgo Trans Europ Express begins providing a through service between Barcelona (Spain) and Geneva (Switzerland) with a wheelset change at Portbou station to overcome the break-of-gauge at the Spanish–French border.
- June 20 – MBTA Green Line A branch trolley line "temporarily suspended"

=== September events ===
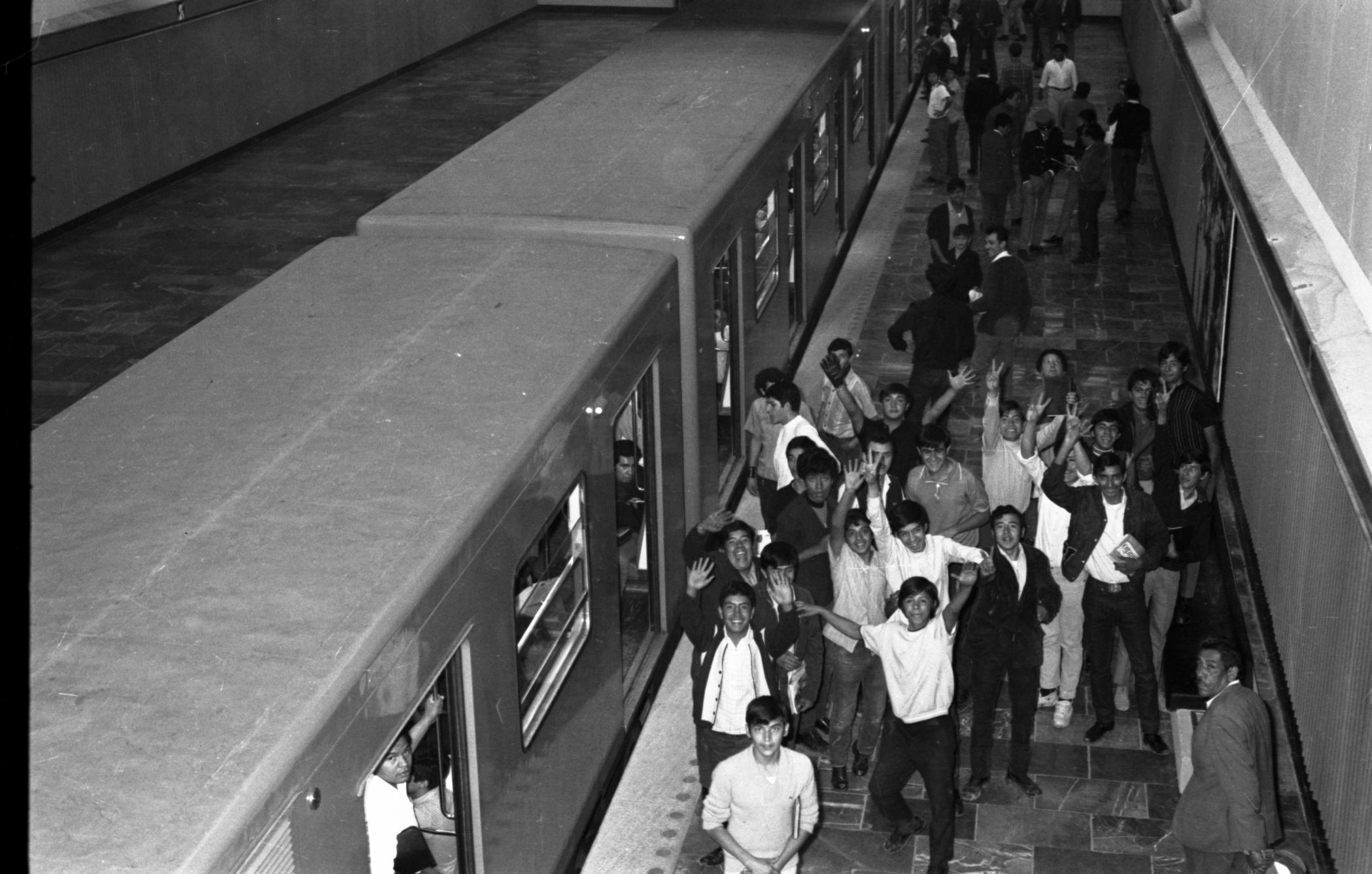
Passengers at Chapultepec metro station the day after opening of the Mexico City Subway.

- September 4 – Mexico City Metro Line 1, Chapultepec to Zaragoza route officially starts operation, a first section of Mexico City Subway.
- September 28 – The Dan Ryan Extension of the Chicago "L" system is placed in operation between 17th and State Streets and 95th Street in the median of the Dan Ryan Expressway. The new line is originally combined with the Lake Street 'L' to form the West-South Route (Lake-Dan Ryan) providing through service between 95th Street and Harlem Avenue, Forest Park, using the first of the 2200-series rapid transit cars (2201–2350) built by the Budd Company of Philadelphia, Pennsylvania. Nine stations, designed by the architectural firm of Skidmore, Owens and Merrill, are opened at Cermak-Chinatown, Sox-35th, 47th, Garfield, 63rd, 69th, 79th, 87th, and 95th. The Dan Ryan branch later becomes the southern half of the Red Line.

=== October events ===
- October 14 – Seibu Railway's Chichibu Line opens in Japan.

=== November events ===
- November 3 – Kansas City Southern's Southern Belle passenger train service between Kansas City, Missouri, and New Orleans, Louisiana, makes its final run.
- November 29 – Opening of standard gauge link between Broken Hill and Port Pirie, completing the East–West rail corridor, Australia, on standard gauge between Sydney and Perth.

=== December events ===
- December 6 – The Sakaisuji Line in Osaka, Japan, is opened between Tenjimbashisuji Rokuchōme and Dobutsuen-mae.
- December 12 – First section of RER suburban rail network in Paris opened.
- December 15 (00:50) – The last train departs Paris Gare de la Bastille, hauled by SNCF class 141TB-432 on the Ligne de Vincennes to Boissy-Saint-Léger. The Gare de la Bastille is the last terminus in Paris operated entirely by steam locomotives.
- December 20 – The Tokyo Metro Chiyoda Line is opened between Kita-Senju and Ōtemachi stations.

=== Unknown date events ===
- ALCO ceases new diesel locomotive manufacturing.
- The Atchison, Topeka and Santa Fe Railway operates the last freight train on its subsidiary Grand Canyon Railway.
- Rail transport in Cambodia: The line from Phnom Penh to the southern port city of Sihanoukville is completed.

== Deaths ==
- May 2 – Donald Gordon, president of Canadian National Railway 1950–1966, dies (b. 1901).
