= 2000-series (CTA) =

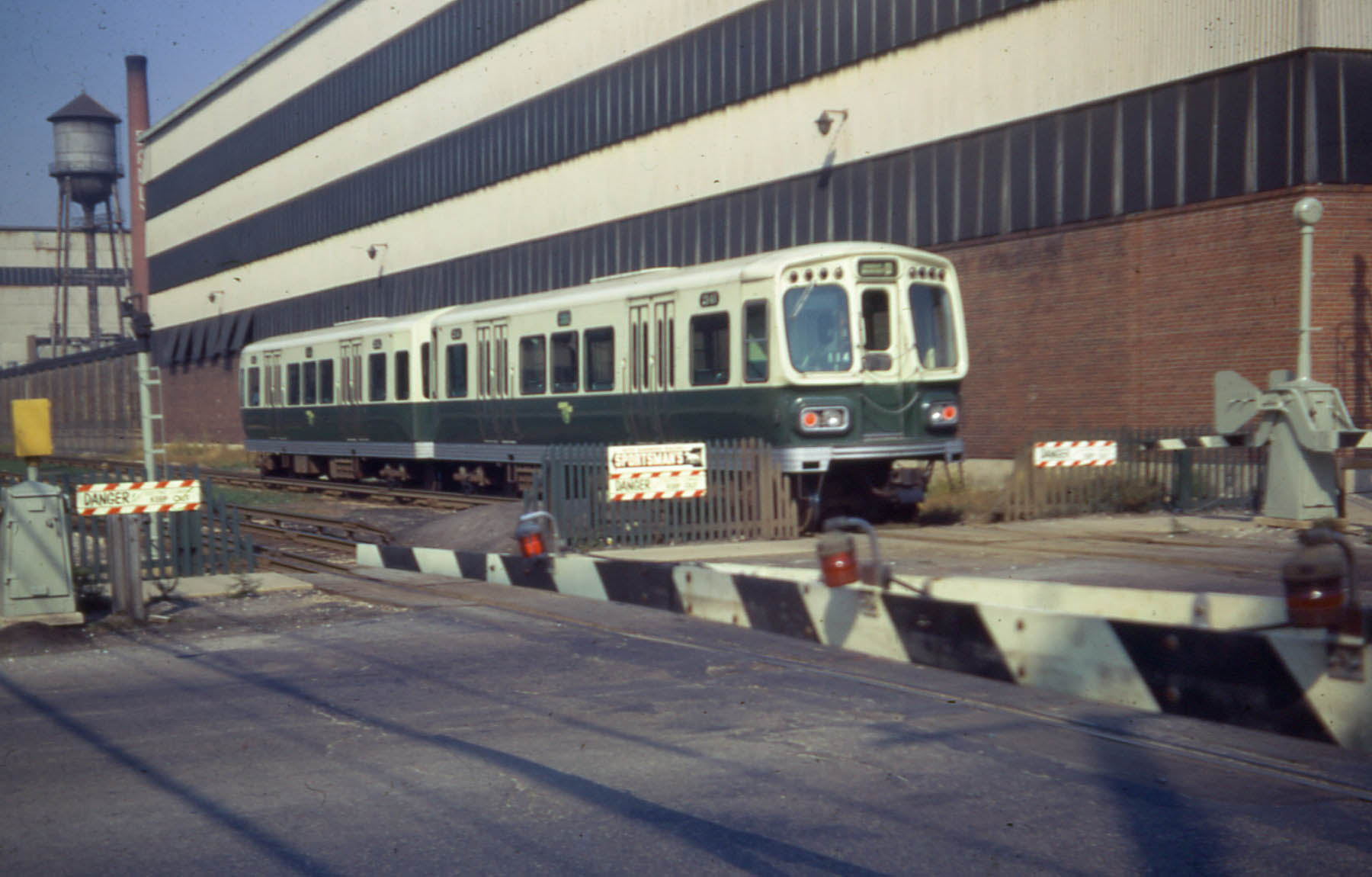
- CTA 2141 at Laramie Ave
- In service: June 18, 1964 – December 17, 1993 (29 years)
- Manufacturer: Pullman-Standard
- Built at: Pullman-Standard Plant, Chicago, Illinois
- Family name: High Performance
- Constructed: 1964
- Entered service: 1964
- Scrapped: 1993
- Number built: 180
- Number preserved: 2
- Number scrapped: 176
- Successor: 3200-series
- Formation: Married pair
- Fleet numbers: 2001–2180
- Capacity: 47 (A car) or 51 (B car) seated
- Operator: Chicago Transit Authority

Specifications
- Car body construction: Aluminum
- Car length: 48 feet (14.63 m)
- Width: 9 feet 4 inches (2.84 m)
- Height: 12 feet (3.66 m)
- Doors: 4 per car
- Maximum speed: Design: 65 mph (105 km/h); Service: 55 mph (89 km/h)
- Weight: 47,400 pounds (21,500 kg)
- Traction motors: 4 × GE 1250K1 100 hp (75 kW) DC motor
- Power output: 400 hp (300 kW)
- Electric systems: Third rail, 600 V DC
- Current collection: Contact shoe
- Track gauge: 4 ft 8 1/2 in (1,435 mm) standard gauge

The 2000-series was a series of Chicago "L" car built in 1964 by Pullman-Standard of Chicago, Illinois. 180 cars were built.

The 2000-series was the first of five series of Chicago "L" cars known as the High-Performance Family. Delivered to the CTA in 1964, they were built as married-pair sets, like the PCC-based 6000-series cars before them. The 2000-series, along with the High-Performance Family in general, were meant as both as a supplement for the 6000-series cars (which were built from discontinued PCC streetcar components) and a replacement for the aging 4000-series cars dating from the early 20th century. The CTA also needed a train car that would meet more modern demands for train service, such as higher speeds and more comfortable interiors.

The 2000-series' more modern control systems initially prevented them from being used in a train with other system types, until the delivery of the 2200-series and later cars in the High-Performance Family. These cars were the baselines of future CTA cars to come, equipped with a futuristic look and modern technology: they were also extremely reliable, averaging 50,000 miles a year on busy lines such as the Lake–Dan Ryan Line. The cars had a number of modern features for the time, including air conditioning, fluorescent lighting, large windows, and sculptured fiberglass front ends for the car bodies. The car bodies were mainly aluminum. The High-Performance Family of designs would last until 1994 when the 3200-series were built, however even 21st century CTA cars, such as the 5000-series cars, are close relatives of the High Performance Design cars with improvements for technological advances.

However, the 2000-series cars would have the shortest service life of all the High-Performance Family cars. Over the decades, the completely new advances presented in the 2000-series cars for the time presented maintenance problems in the future; the aluminum bodies rusted quickly in the Chicago winters, while snow caused motors to short out and brakes to become non-functional (especially after the 1979 blizzard). The 2200-series cars, originally meant as complements to the 2000-series cars, were much more durable on the L's busier lines, while the 2000-series cars were moved to the lower traffic lines. The superior construction of the 2200-series, with a flat sided stainless steel body, under-car air conditioning units (as opposed to the 2000s interior units), and more capable Budd Pioneer motors all contributed to the much longer lifespan of the 2200-series over the 2000-series; the final blow came when the Green Line closed for renovation, as the 2000-series were not considered capable enough for Red or Blue Line service.

The last 2000-series cars were scrapped after their final service on the Green Line on December 17, 1993, ending with 29 years of service. The Illinois Railway Museum in Union, Illinois owns both pairs of surviving cars: one pair of cars, 2153-2154, is preserved and operational: pair 2007-2008, painted in South Side Elevated Colors, are used as parts cars and separated from one another, though sometimes displayed to the public.
