= Harlem Yard =

Chicago "L" rail yard

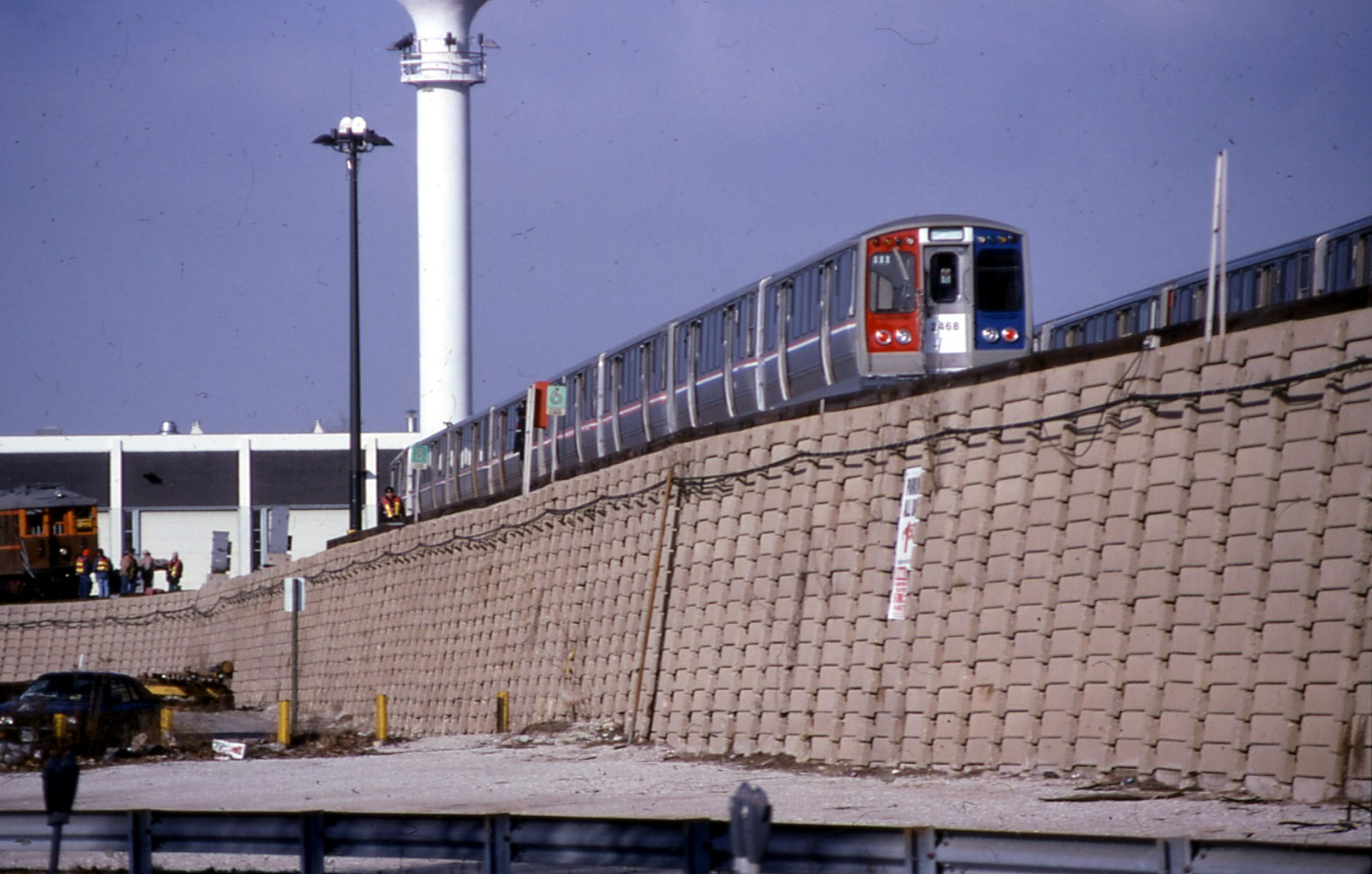
- A 2400-series "L" train in the Harlem Yard with a heritage 4000-series train in the background, 1996
- Interactive map of Harlem Yard

Location
- Location: 317 East 63rd Street; Chicago, Illinois 60637
- Coordinates: 41.8867°N 87.8080°W

Characteristics
- Owner: Chicago Transit Authority
- Type: Rapid transit
- Rolling stock: 5000-series
- Routes served: Green

The Harlem Yard is a CTA rail yard in Forest Park, Illinois which stores cars for the Green Line of the Chicago Transit Authority. Currently, 5000-series railcars are stored here. It is adjacent to Harlem/Lake station.
