= Loop Shuttle =

Chicago "L" rapid transit line (1969–1977)

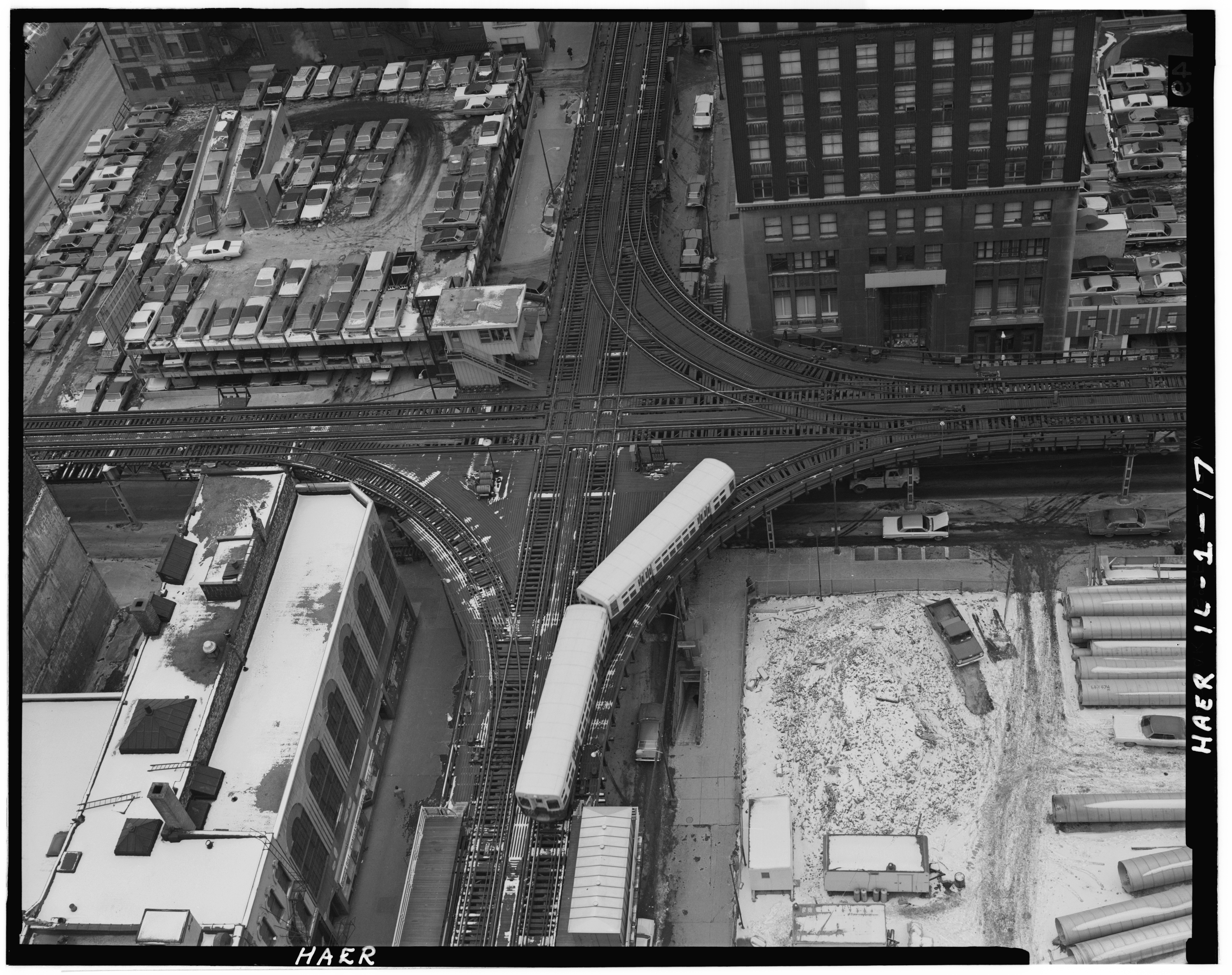
- A Loop Shuttle train operates around the inner track at Tower 18 (Lake and Wells Streets).

Overview
- Status: Defunct
- Locale: Chicago, Illinois, United States
- Stations: 9

Service
- Type: Rapid transit
- System: Chicago "L"
- Route number: L
- Operator: Chicago Transit Authority
- Depot: Kimball Yard
- Rolling stock: 6000-series

History
- Opened: September 30, 1969
- Closed: September 30, 1977

Technical
- Character: Elevated
- Track gauge: 4 ft 8 1/2 in (1,435 mm)
- Minimum radius: 90 feet (27 m)
- Electrification: Third rail, 600 V DC
Route map
The Loop highlighted in black

The Loop Shuttle was a rapid transit line on the Chicago "L". It operated clockwise around the Loop, making stops at all stations. The line was inaugurated September 30, 1969, and discontinued September 30, 1977.

== Operations ==
The Loop Shuttle operated continuously clockwise around the Inner Loop, approximately 1.79 miles (2.88 km). The line provided service Monday through Saturday during the day, with no late night or Sunday service. Evening service was dropped later in its life. The line typically used two-car 6000-series assigned to Kimball Yard.

During weekday rush hours, the Evanston Express was the only other route to use the inner loop. Southbound Lake–Dan Ryan trains shared the inner track on the Lake and Wabash segment.

While the CTA did not formally adopt color-coded lines during the Loop Shuttle's lifetime, the service was depicted as gray or black on color maps.

== History ==
Opportunity for a continuous "L" line around the Loop was realized in 1969, when modifications were underway to allow through service of the Lake Street branch to the newly completed Dan Ryan branch. Prior to this all trains ran counter-clockwise, with Ravenswood and Evanston Express trains using the outer track and Lake Street trains using the inner track. The new Lake–Dan Ryan Line began on September 28, 1969, and Loop Shuttle service began two days later on September 30. The Ravenswood Line would continue operating counter-clockwise via the outer track and Evanston Express trains would shift to operating clockwise around the inner track on September 30.

The Loop Shuttle was quietly discontinued on September 30, 1977 as a cost-cutting measure. After the Loop Shuttle's discontinuation, the Evanston Express remained the only route to run clockwise around the Loop. Full-time service around the inner loop was restored with the introduction of the Orange Line in 1993 and later the Pink Line in 2006.

=== Present-day usage ===
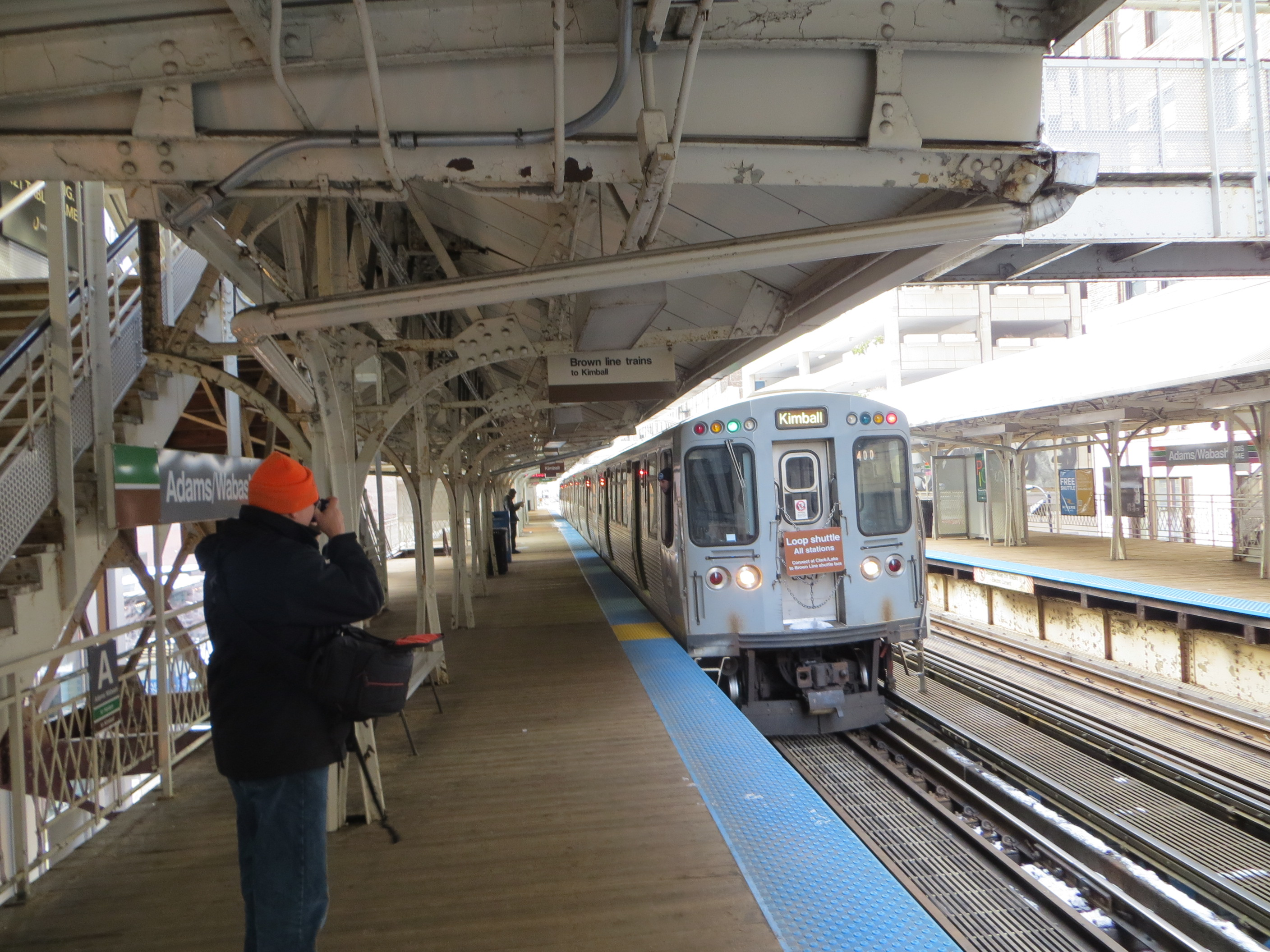
Replacement of the Wells Street Bridge necessitated a temporary Loop Shuttle service in 2013

In the event of service disruptions that prevent trains from accessing the Loop, the CTA may provide a shuttle train to retain access at all Loop stations. The service allows riders to transfer between rail replacement buses or trains rerouted via the subway to mitigate travel impacts. Recently, CTA has operated a counter-clockwise Loop Shuttle during the replacement of the Wells Street Bridge and renovation of the Ravenswood Connector in 2013 and 2015, respectively.

== Station listing ==
Station	Connecting "L" services and notes (Note: The Ravenswood Line and Evanston Express exist today as the Brown Line and Purple Line, respectively. During the Loop Shuttle's lifetime they were depicted with "swapped" colors. Additionally, the south portions of today's Red and Green Lines were switched.)
Clark/Lake (inner platform)	Lake–Dan Ryan Ravenswood Evanston Express; Milwaukee–Congress–Douglas (at Lake Transfer)
State/Lake (inner platform)	Lake–Dan Ryan Ravenswood Evanston Express; Howard–Englewood–Jackson Park (at Washington)
Randolph/Wabash (inner platform)	Lake–Dan Ryan Ravenswood Evanston Express
Madison/Wabash (inner platform)	Lake–Dan Ryan Ravenswood Evanston Express
Adams/Wabash (inner platform)	Lake–Dan Ryan Ravenswood Evanston Express
State/Van Buren (inner platform)	Closed September 2, 1973
LaSalle/Van Buren (inner platform)	Ravenswood Evanston Express
Quincy (inner platform)	Ravenswood Evanston Express
Madison/Wells (inner platform)	Ravenswood Evanston Express
Randolph/Wells (inner platform)	Ravenswood Evanston Express
Trains return to Clark/Lake
