= Gare de la Bastille =

Demolished railway station in Paris, France

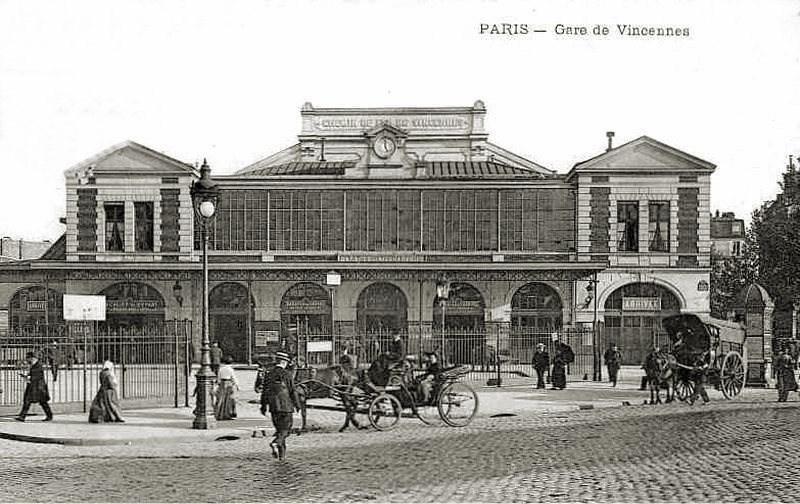
- La Bastille Station in Paris, early 20th century

General information
- Location: Place de la Bastille, Paris
- Coordinates: 48°51′9″N 2°22′13″E
- System: Heavy rail
- Owner: Chemins de fer de l'Est (1859–1938); SNCF (1938–1969)
- Line: Ligne de Vincennes
- Tracks: 5

History
- Opened: 22 September 1859
- Closed: 15 December 1969
Location

The Gare de la Bastille (French pronunciation: [ɡaʁ d(ə) la bastij]; English: Bastille station) was a railway station on the Place de la Bastille in the 12th arrondissement of Paris, France. The station was opened in 1859 and served as the terminus of the 55-kilometre (34 mi)-long line to Vincennes and Verneuil-l'Étang. The line was opened only to serve the Fort de Vincennes; it was extended to La Varenne and later to Brie-Comte-Robert. The line finally reached Verneuil-l'Étang in 1892 and connected to the line to Mulhouse.

Part of the line was included in the new suburban commuter rail line RER A on 14 December 1969. The station was demolished in 1984 to create the space for the Opéra Bastille.

== History ==
Designed by François-Alexis Cendrier, the Gare de la Bastille was one of Paris's earliest railway termini. In 1853, the French government decided that a strategic connection with the fort at Vincennes was desirable. The Compagnie du Chemin de Fer de Paris à Strasbourg was granted a concession to build the line, and a connecting line to Mulhouse. The Mulhouse line would share the Gare de Strasbourg (now the Gare de Paris-Est), but the Ligne de Vincennes would also create a new terminus close to the centre of Paris, the Gare de la Bastille. In 1853, the company, now known as the Chemins de fer de l'Est (CF de l'Est), opened the 17-kilometre (11 mi)-long line between Vincennes and La Varenne. The extension to Paris opened on 22 September 1859. and the line was soon carrying 6,000,000 passengers each year.

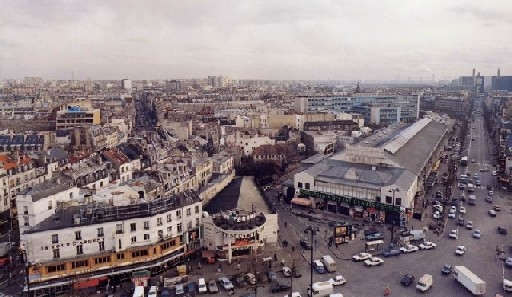
La Bastille station in the 1980s

In 1871, following the end of the Franco-Prussian War, France lost Alsace-Lorraine to Germany. This drastically reduced the territory served by the CF de l'Est. As a result, the Gare de l'Est was developed to become the CF de l'Est's main station in Paris. Although the Gare de la Bastille was only a local terminus, by 1889 it was the second busiest in Paris, handling 12,000,000 passengers per annum. The Ligne de Vincennes was extended to Verneuil-l'Étang in 1892, making it 55 kilometres (34 mi) long. The station served commuters during the week, and Parisians escaping to the country on weekends. By the 1920s, the Gare de la Bastille was handling 30,000,000 passengers each year. Electric traversers were installed to allow longer trains to be handled.

Along with the Depression of the 1930s came increased competition from buses and the Métro. Passenger numbers decreased by half, and the CF de l'Est attempted to close the line. Permission for this was refused but the 19-kilometre (12 mi) section between Brie-Comte-Robert and Verneuil-l'Etang was closed to passengers in 1939, though it was temporarily revived during and for a while after the Second World War. In 1945, the Gare de la Bastille became for a few months what it had originally been intended to be, a main line terminus or Gare des Grande Lignes. This followed the wartime destruction of a viaduct at Nogent-sur-Marne that had cut the main line from the Gare de l'Est to Mulhouse so long-distance trains were diverted to Bastille. In 1953, the Ligne de Vincennes closed to passengers beyond Boissy-Saint-Léger.

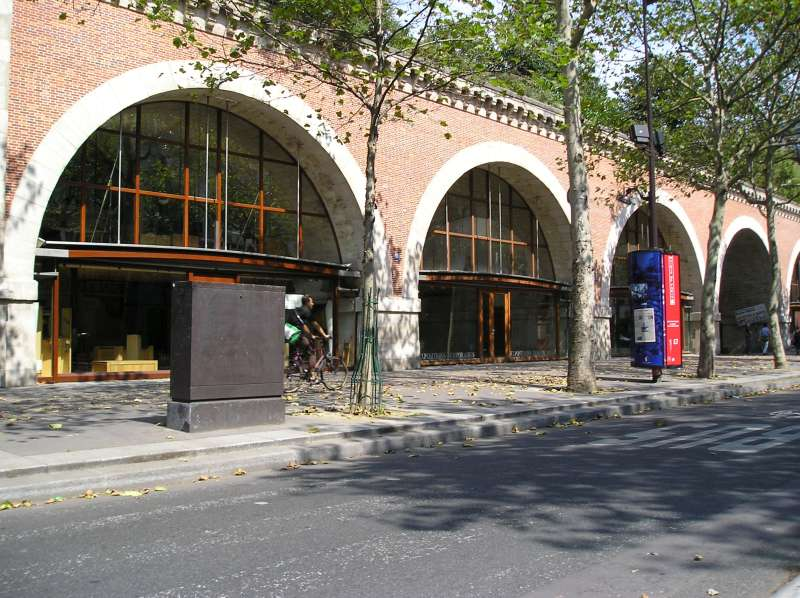
Viaduc des Arts

In the mid-1960s, construction of the Réseau Express Régional (RER) began. The Ligne de Vincennes as far as Boissy-Saint-Léger was to become part of a high-speed métro and its first 5 kilometres (3.1 mi) would be replaced with a new underground line. The last train departed the Gare de la Bastille at 00:50 on 15 December 1969, hauled by locomotive 141 TB 432. The Gare de la Bastille was the last terminus in Paris operated entirely by steam locomotives. Following closure, the station buildings became a concert and exhibition hall. A number of pop concerts were held there and in 1976, a major model railway exhibition. The station buildings were listed as being of historic importance but despite this, they were demolished in 1984 to make way for the Opéra Bastille. The 1,200-metre (1,300 yd) long viaduct which formed the approach to the station survives. The former rail lines are now the Promenade plantée, whilst the arches now form the Viaduc des Arts, located alongside the Avenue de Daumesnil.

== Services ==
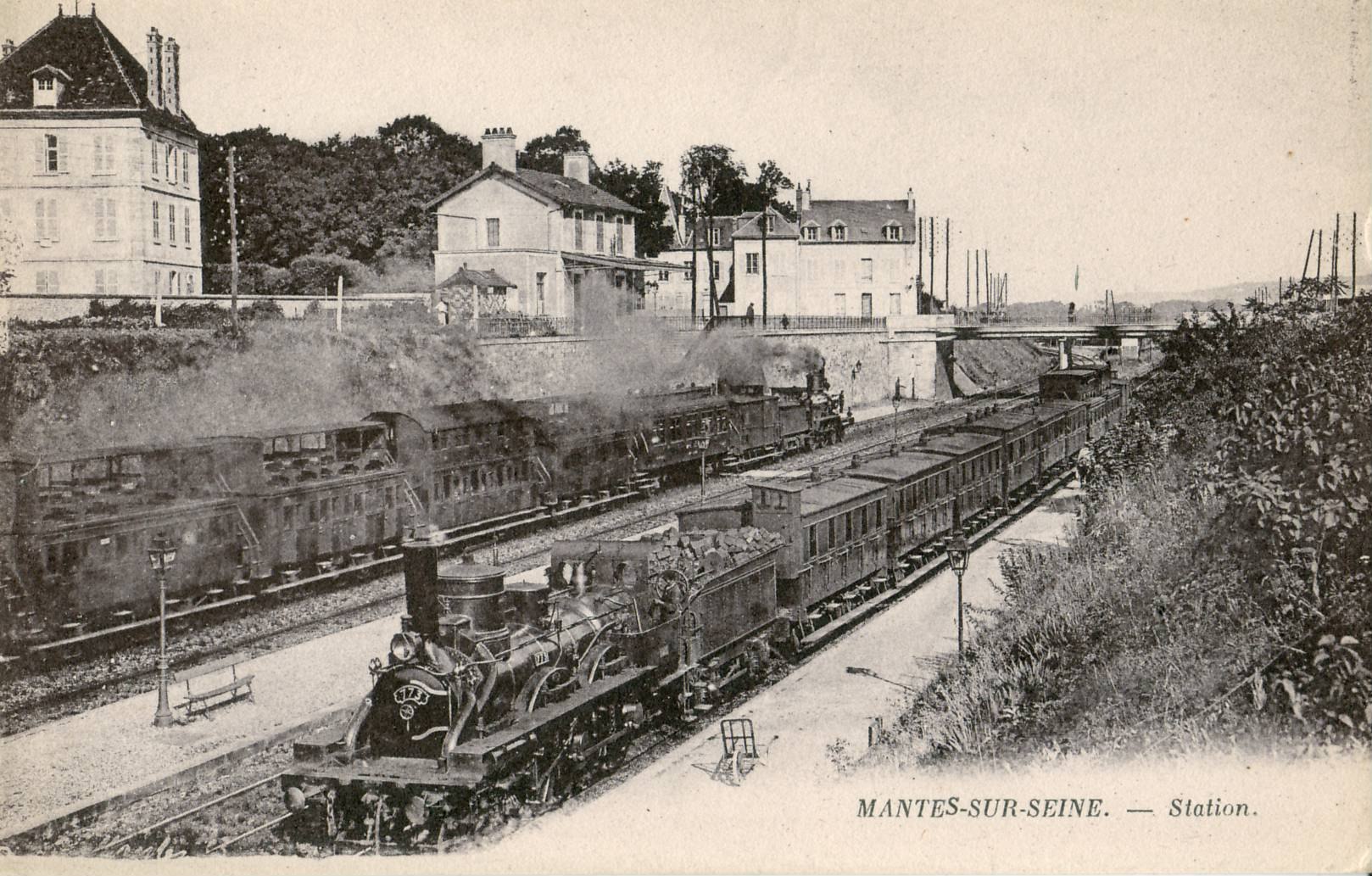
Trains at Mantes-sur-Seine, "Bidel" carriages in use

When the station opened in 1859, services were provided by 2-4-0 locomotives. There was no room at the Gare de la Bastille for a turntable, and these locomotives were replaced by 2-4-0T locomotives (CF de L'Est Class 120) by the 1870s. These in turn were replaced by 0-6-2T locomotives (later SNCF Class 031TA) and 2-6-2T (later SNCF Class 131TA) locomotives. From 1925, larger 2-6-2T locomotives (later SNCF Class 131TB) worked the line. From the 1960s, SNCF class 141TB 2-8-2T locomotives worked the line.

Early passenger carriages were of a double-deck type known as "Imperials". From the 1890s, these were replaced by another double-deck type known as "Bidels". Trains usually included a fourgon (brake van) at each end of the train to save time by removing the need for shunting. The "Bidels" were in service until 1949 on the Ligne de Vincennes and for a few years later elsewhere. An "Imperial" and a "Bidel" are preserved at the Musée Français du Chemin de Fer in Mulhouse. After the end of the Second World War, bogie carriages previously in service with the Deutsche Reichsbahn were used. These were known by the French as "Bastilles". Following the electrification of the line serving the Gare de l'Est in the early 1960s, push–pull stock replaced the "Bastilles". They were used until the line closed in 1969.

The Gare de la Bastille was, except possibly in its earliest days, an almost purely passenger station. Parcels and post were handled but almost the only freight was coal for the three-road engine shed. General freight was handled at a goods station located at the other end of the viaduct at Reuilly but the Gare de la Bastille did handle one rather unusual traffic. Following devastation by phylloxera and increased competition from wine shipped in by rail, vineyards that had traditionally supplied Paris in the area served by the outer rural section of the Ligne de Vincennes switched to growing roses. A Train des Roses was introduced as early as 1897, arriving at the Gare de la Bastille in the early hours. The roses were sold in the markets at Les Halles. Traffic peaked at over 1,000,000 roses per night.

By the First World War, there were 45 arrivals and departures daily. Eight trains a day ran the full length of the line to Verneuil-l'Etang, with stations closer to Paris receiving a more frequent service than those further away. Between 1925 and 1930, there were about 70 arrivals and departures daily; these had been cut to 48 by 1938.
