= Linden Yard (CTA) =

Chicago "L" rail yard

The Linden Yard is a CTA rail yard in Wilmette, Illinois, which stores cars from the Purple Line of the Chicago Transit Authority. Currently, 5000-series railcars are stored here. It is adjacent to Linden station.
