= Cineston controller =

Control lever used in mass transit vehicles

The Cineston controller is a control lever used in mass transit vehicles that combines the accelerator, brake and emergency controls into a single hand-operated device. The Cineston controller allows smooth operation of the vehicle, avoids the application of brake and throttle at the same time, and provides a clear visual indication of the current power setting. However, it is only suitable for vehicles that do not require steering control, as it is hand operated and thus interferes with the presence of any sort of steering wheel.

The Cineston evolved from the rotary controllers used to control the power delivered to the electric traction motors in early mass transit systems. In early systems, notably those found in trams, the motor control was operated by the left hand, and the brakes by the right hand. Typically the brake lever also included a dead man's switch that released air pressure to activate the air brakes in an emergency. In the Cineston, motor control and brake controls are combined in a single lever's rotary motion, and the dead man's switch is implemented in a vertical motion.

The lever extends to the right from a vertical control shaft. The lever has a neutral position with the lever extended directly to the left of the pivot. Braking is applied by progressively rotating the lever counter-clockwise, which, due to the position of the lever relative to the pivot, is actuated by the operator moving their hand away from the body - to the "front". Forward traction is added by rotating the lever clockwise, or "backward". As the lever translates linear motion by the operator into rotary motion of the lever, the lever is normally topped with a rotating knob at the right end. This allows the operator to slide the lever without twisting their wrist. The controller often also incorporates a fail-safe device (or dead man's switch) that requires constant downward pressure once the lever is rotated forward from the neutral position. Releasing the lever causes it to pop up on a spring, activating emergency braking.

The Cineston controller is known to have design flaws. If the operator suffers from a debilitating attack, they may fall forward onto the control, allowing their body weight to keep the dead-man's switch in its safe position. Additionally, because the lever typically moves forward for traction, in the event of a sudden stop the operator's inertia can cause the lever to be forced forward, increasing traction. This was mentioned as a possibility in the 1977 Chicago Loop derailment, where the operator continued accelerating after a minor collision for unknown reasons.

The Cineston's general operation is similar to the slide-controllers found in many modern mass transit systems. These controllers can be considered to be a re-implementation of the Cineston, as its fore-aft motion for acceleration and braking is the same. The change in layout is due to the introduction of new electronic controls, which do not require any mechanical connection between the operating lever and the electrical control systems.
