= 2400-series (CTA) =

Train used in Chicago, US

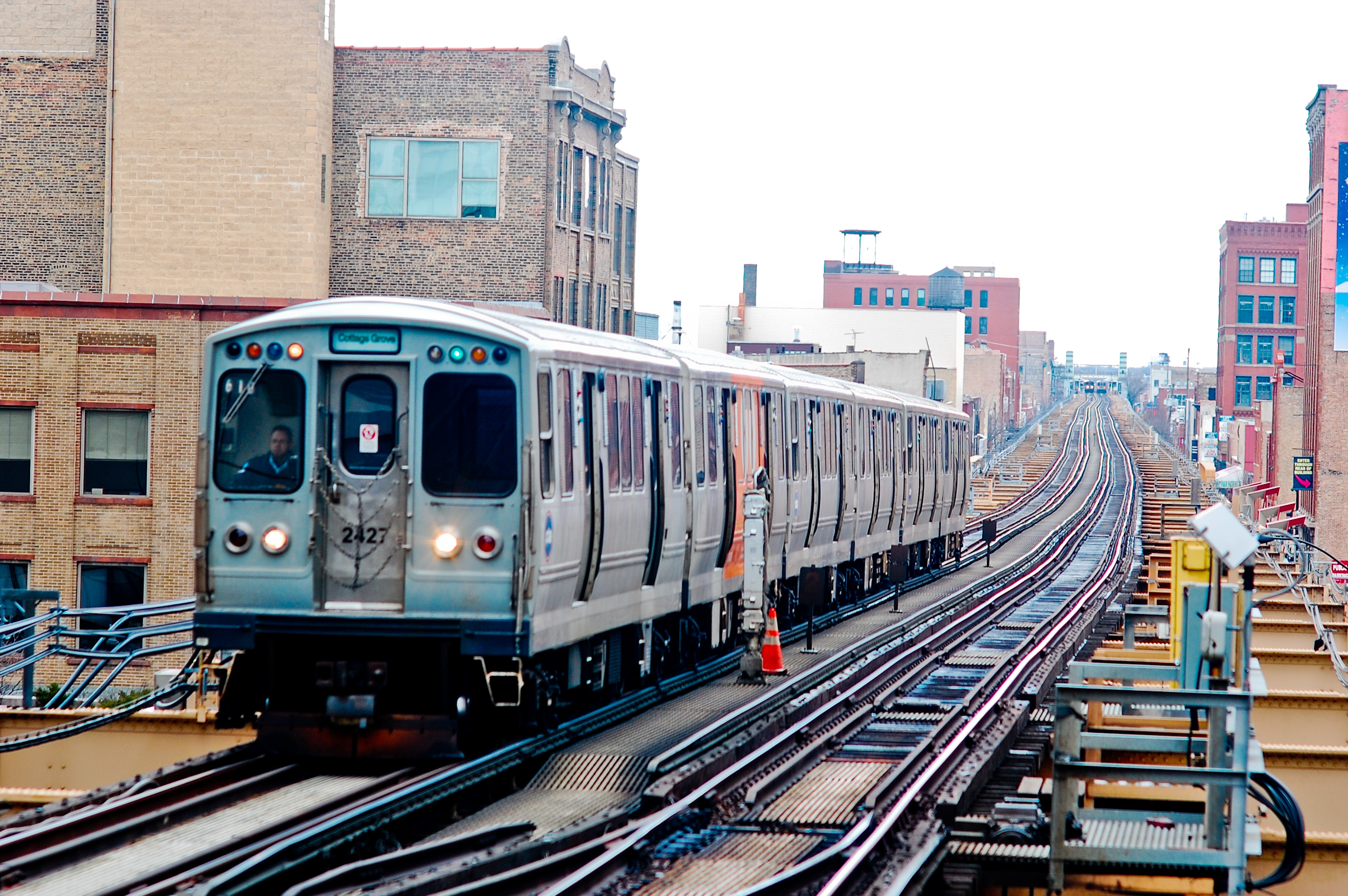
- A 2400-series train on the Green Line at Clinton
- In service: August 29, 1976 – October 31, 2014 (38 years)
- Manufacturer: Boeing-Vertol
- Built at: Boeing-Vertol Plant, Ridley Park, Pennsylvania
- Family name: High Performance
- Constructed: 1976–1979
- Entered service: 1976
- Refurbished: 1987–1995, Skokie Shops, Skokie, Illinois
- Scrapped: 2013–2015
- Number built: 200
- Number in service: 8 (in heritage fleet service)
- Number preserved: 15
- Number scrapped: 185
- Successor: 5000-series
- Formation: Married pair
- Fleet numbers: 2401–2600
- Capacity: 43 (A car) or 45 (B car) seated
- Operator: Chicago Transit Authority

Specifications
- Car body construction: Stainless steel with fiberglass end bonnets
- Car length: 48 feet (15 m)
- Width: 9 feet 4 inches (2.84 m)
- Height: 12 feet (3.66 m)
- Doors: 4 per car
- Maximum speed: Design: 70 mph (110 km/h); Service: 55 mph (89 km/h)
- Weight: 54,300 pounds (24,600 kg)
- Traction motors: 4 × GE 1262A1 110 hp (82 kW) DC motor
- Power output: 440 hp (330 kW)
- Electric systems: Third rail, 600 V DC
- Current collection: Contact shoe
- Braking systems: Regenerative and disc brakes
- Track gauge: 4 ft 8 1/2 in (1,435 mm) standard gauge

The 2400-series was a series of Chicago "L" cars built between 1976 and 1979 by Boeing-Vertol of Ridley Park, Pennsylvania, with shells fabricated by Sorefame. 200 cars were built (numbered 2401–2600) and on October 31, 2014, the series was retired from revenue service. These cars were in service for 38 years.

== History ==
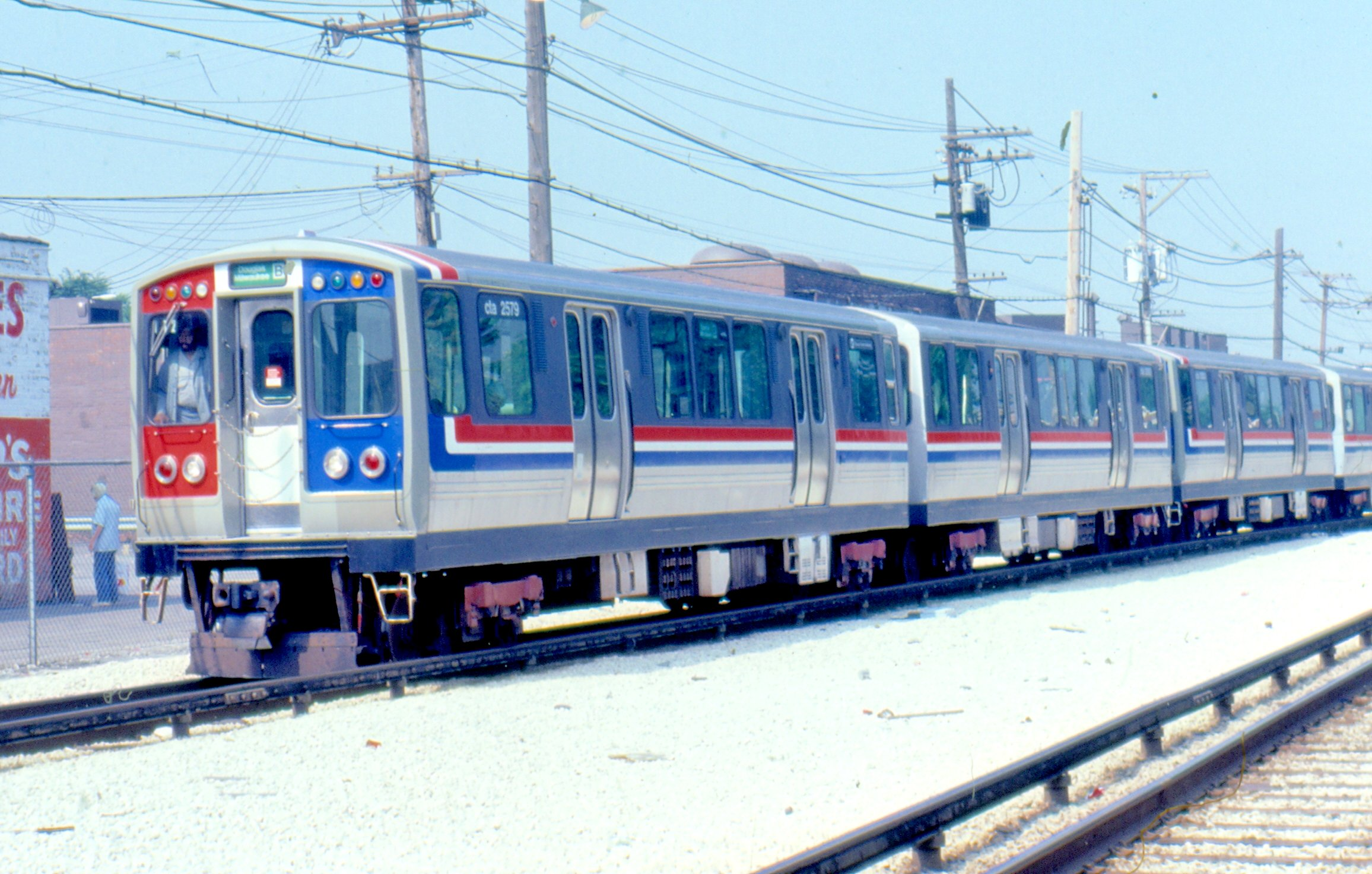
2400-Series cars at 49th Avenue in 1981

The 2400-series is the third of five series of Chicago "L" cars known as the High Performance Family. These cars were the first "L" cars built since the 4000 series of 1914 to feature sliding doors rather than the folding blinker doors featured on the other cars that were in service at the time, with wider doorways allowing the cars to accommodate wheelchair users. The 2400-series cars featured smooth steel exteriors as opposed to the corrugated exteriors of the previous series, as well as all-fiberglass end bonnets as opposed to the stainless steel end bonnets with fiberglass window/headlight masks found on the previous series cars.

As delivered, the cars featured a red, white and blue color scheme on the front and rear of the cars, as well as stripes along the sides. Cars 2401–2422 were later modified to be used for work service as well as revenue passenger service and given red and white striping along their sides as well as on the front and rear of the cars. The cars were rehabbed at the Skokie Shops in Skokie, Illinois from 1987 until 1995. These work motor units remained active until at most July 2022.

Beginning in fall 2003, the red, white and blue colors on the ends and sides of the 2400-series cars were removed, giving the cars an unpainted steel appearance similar to the rest of the "L" fleet. This was done so as to give a more unified appearance, as well as to reduce maintenance costs. The work cars retained the red and white striping on their ends, but the stripes on their sides were removed.

== Operation ==
In the 1990s, the 2400-series cars were used on the Red Line in mixed consists with unrehabbed 2600-series cars. While the 2600-series cars were being rebuilt, the 2400-series cars were used temporarily on the Red Line. These cars were used again on the Red Line from 2012 to 2013. From the reopening of the Green Line on May 12, 1996 until mid-May 2013, these cars were assigned to the Green Line and they were replaced by the 5000-series cars. Until late May 2014, these cars were also assigned to the Purple Line; for the entire 2000s and early 2010s, the Purple Line fleet consisted entirely, or nearly entirely of these cars. The Purple Line fleet of 2400-series cars were retired in May 2014 and have been replaced by the 2600-series cars which were transferred from the Red Line as more 5000-series cars were assigned to that line and since April 2014, several 5000-series cars have been assigned to the Purple Line as well. From November 8, 2012 until retirement on October 31, 2014, some of these cars were also assigned to the Orange Line. During the morning rush hour on October 31, 2014, the 2400-series operated its last revenue run on the Orange Line. The Orange Line cars have been replaced by the 2600-series cars until the Red and Purple Lines are fully equipped with the 5000-series cars. However, as of November 2015, the assignment of 2600-series cars to the Orange Line was permanent until the delivery of the 7000-series cars in 2021, since all 5000-series cars had been delivered with all cars fully assigned to all lines except for the Orange, Blue, and Brown Lines.

These cars were used for the Lake/Dan Ryan, West-Northwest, Ravenswood and Howard/Englewood routes.

=== Retirement ===
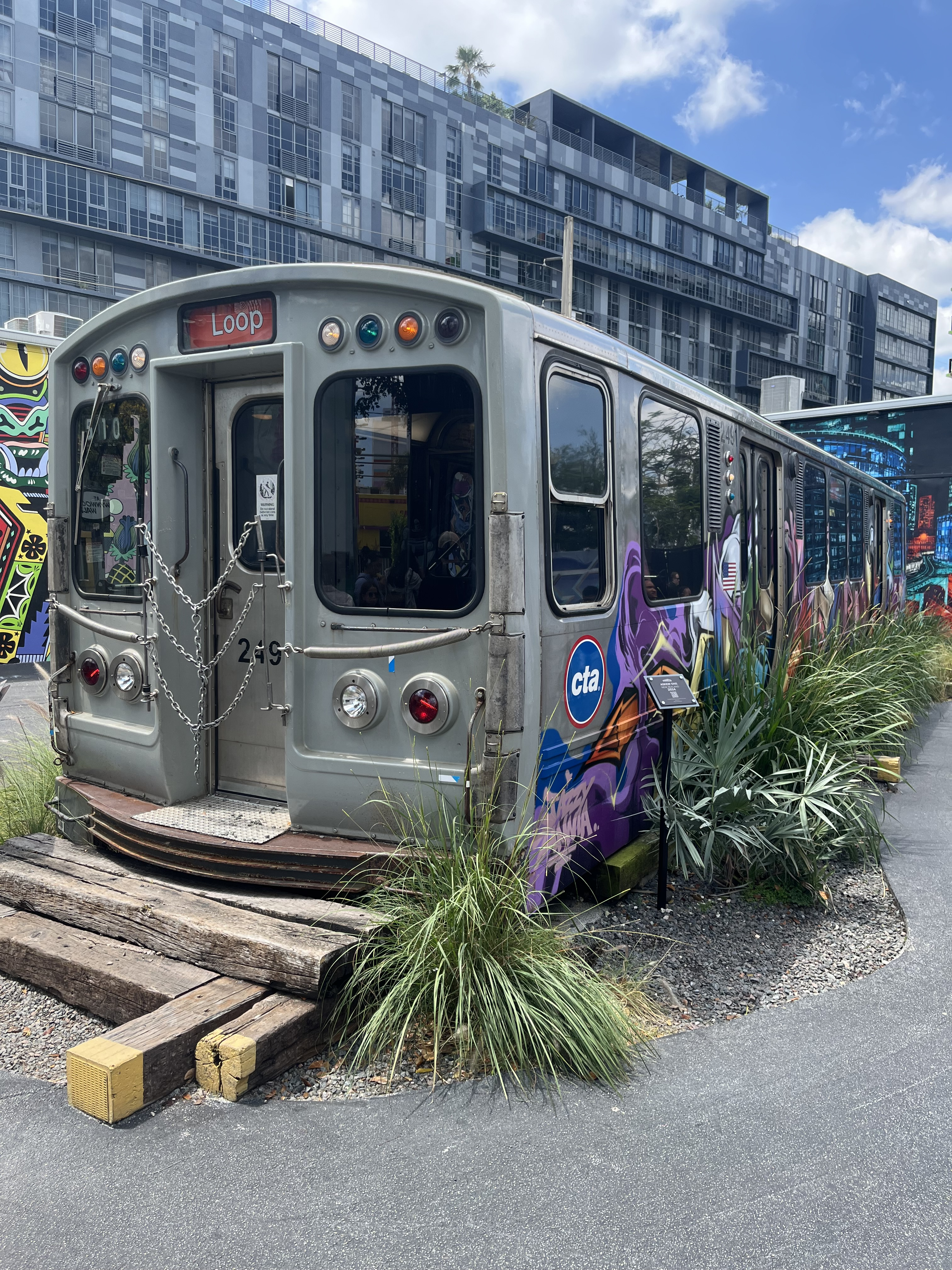
2400 Series car 2491 is used as a exhibit at the Wynwood Walls

Retirement of the 2400-series cars began in 2013, after the retirement of the 2200-series cars and was completed in October 2014, 194 of the 200 cars built remained in service into the 21st century.

In addition, 24 cars were modified to continue life as nonrevenue maintenance vehicles until 2023.

A majority of the cars have been scrapped, however, some have been preserved. Preserved cars include:

- 2433-2434, preserved at the Illinois Railway Museum in Union, Illinois.
- 2401-2402, 2455-2456, 2489-2490, 2537-2538, used for the ceremonial last trip of the 2400-series cars on January 21, 2015, except for 2401-2402, which was converted into a work motor. All are used for current CTA fantrips as a part of the CTA's heritage fleet.
- 2491, converted to an art exhibit at Wynwood Walls in the Wynwood Art District.
- 2503, used for training at the Muscatatuck Urban Training Center.
- 2541, converted to a lounge in an apartment building.
