= 5000-series (CTA) =

Series of Chicago train cars

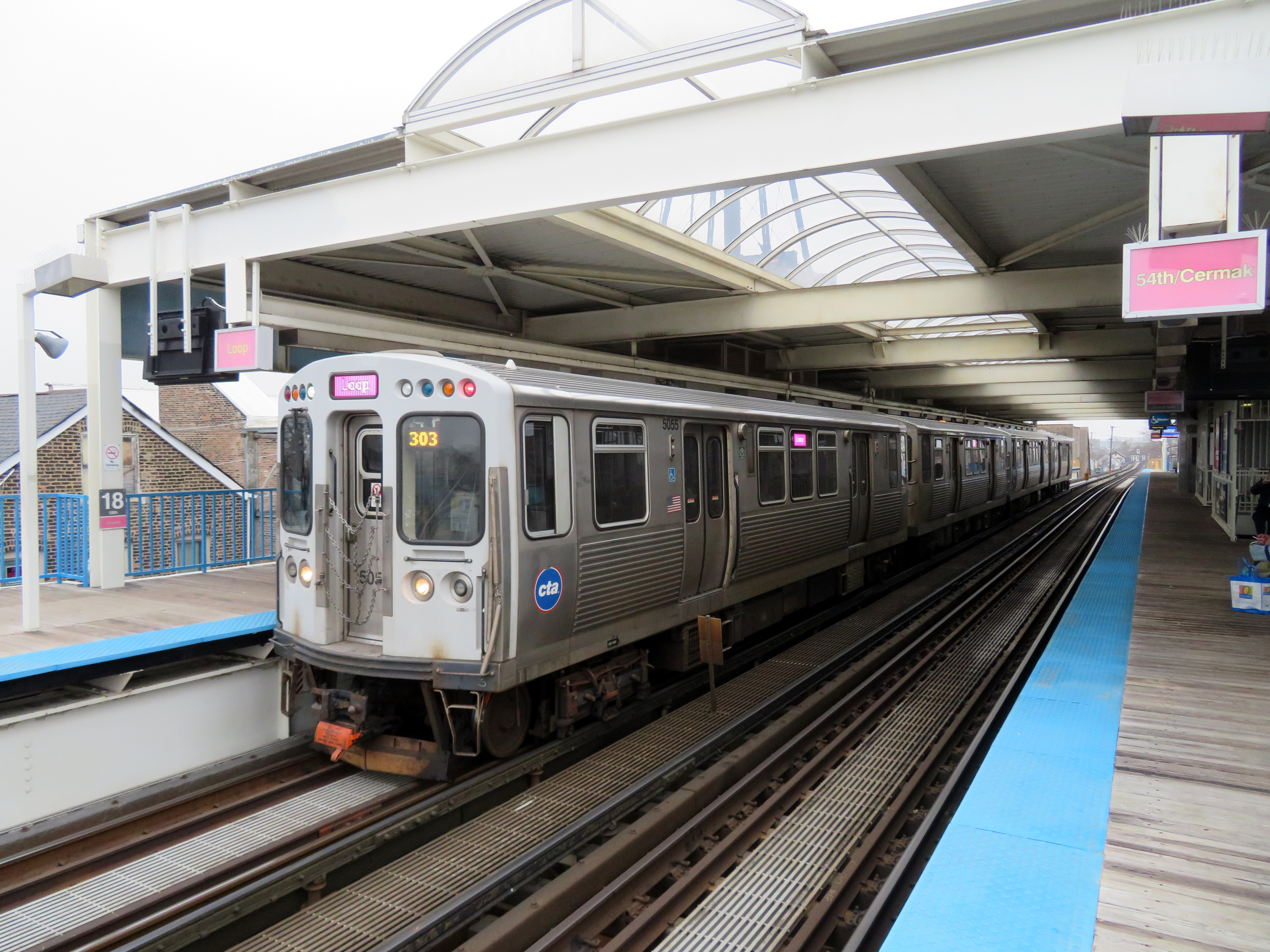
- 5055 at 18th on the Pink Line, bound for The Loop

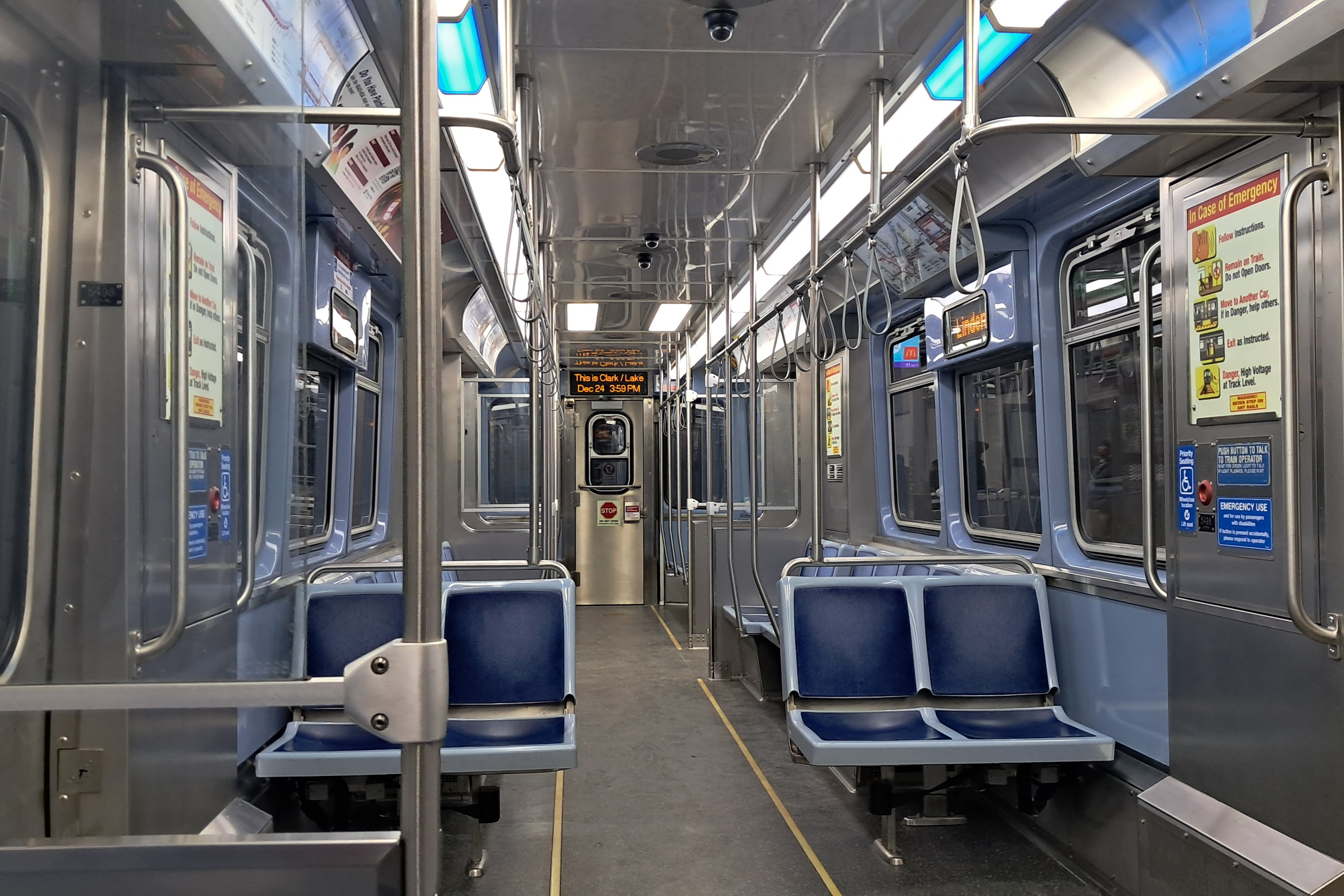
- Interior view of a 5000-series car
- In service: November 8, 2011 – present
- Manufacturer: Bombardier Transportation
- Built at: Bombardier Plant, Plattsburgh, New York
- Replaced: 2200-series, 2400-series
- Constructed: 2009–2015
- Entered service: 2011
- Number built: 714
- Number in service: 710
- Formation: Married-pair
- Fleet numbers: 5001–5714
- Capacity: 34 seated, 123 total
- Operator: Chicago Transit Authority
- Depots: 54th Yard; 98th Yard; Ashland Yard; Harlem Yard; Howard Yard; Linden Yard
- Lines served: Blue Line (rush hour only, from Pink Line); Green Line; Pink Line; Purple Line; Red Line; Yellow Line

Specifications
- Car body construction: Stainless steel with fiberglass end bonnets
- Train length: 96 ft (29.26 m) (married pair); 384 ft (117.04 m) (eight-car train)
- Car length: 48 ft (14.63 m)
- Width: 9 ft 4 in (2.84 m)
- Height: 12 ft (3.66 m)
- Doors: 2 × 2 per car
- Maximum speed: Design: 70 mph (110 km/h); Service: 55 mph (89 km/h)
- Weight: 57,000 lb (26,000 kg) empty
- Traction system: Bombardier MITRAC IGBT–VVVF
- Traction motors: 3-phase AC induction motor
- Electric systems: Third rail, 600 V DC
- Current collection: Contact shoe
- UIC classification: Bo′Bo′+Bo′Bo′
- AAR wheel arrangement: B-B+B-B
- Braking systems: Regenerative, disc, and track brakes
- Track gauge: 4 ft 8 1/2 in (1,435 mm) standard gauge

The 5000 series is a series of Chicago "L" car built between 2009 and 2015 by Bombardier Transportation of Plattsburgh, New York. A $577 million order for 406 cars was placed in 2006. In July 2011, the CTA ordered 300 more cars (later increased to 308 cars) for $331 million as an option on the first contract.

The 5000-series reuses a numbering set used on four experimental articulated train-sets that were in service from 1947 to 1985. These are the first CTA railcars to have interior LED signs that display information such as the date, time, and the next station on the train's route.

== Specifications ==
The first 10 cars began testing in passenger service on April 19, 2010. Following completion of the testing phase and acceptance of the rail cars, a dozen cars are expected to be delivered every month until all cars are in service.

Seating is longitudinal, with passengers facing a wider aisle. This has increased capacity by 20–30% to a total of 123. Vertical stanchions and horizontal overhead bars with straps have been added throughout much of the car to give standing passengers more to hold on to. New amenities include seven security cameras per car, new electronic signs making announcements visually, and "active" system maps showing the location of the train on the line.

Unlike the High-Performance family of railcars, including the 2600-series and 3200-series, the 5000-series is not electrically compatible with other series of railcar in the CTA fleet. Therefore, the 5000-series is not able to multiple-unit in mixed consists with other series of railcar in revenue service, including the new 7000-series cars. In practice, this is not a significant limitation, as lines that are assigned the 5000-series typically do not operate with any other series of railcar.

== Features and usage ==
The 5000-series use technologies such as AC traction equipment that aim to enhance operations and maintenance and provide a smoother, more comfortable ride. Cars 5001–5114 originally came with orange LED destination signs; cars beginning with unit 5115–5116 came equipped with multi-colored LED destination signs that correspond to the line on which the car is operating. The amber-only signs in the existing cars were replaced with the multi-colored signs starting mid-August 2012, starting with units 5095–5096 and 5097–5098.

The first cars were placed into regular service on November 8, 2011, on the Pink Line. The Pink Line was the first line to be fully equipped with the 5000-series cars in June 2012, followed by the Green Line in May 2013, the Yellow Line in March 2014, the Purple Line in March 2015, and the Red Line in November 2015. The CTA planned on assigning some 5000-series cars to the Orange Line, replacing its 2600-series cars, which were supposed to be an interim replacement for the line's 2400-series cars until the Red Line was fully equipped with the 5000-series cars. However, as of November 2015, the assignment of 5000-series cars to the Orange Line is now unlikely since delivery of all 5000-series cars is complete and all 5000-series cars are completely assigned to other lines, thus the assignment of 2600-series cars to the Orange Line is now a permanent assignment until the delivery of the new 7000-series cars. This was likely done to give the Brown line more 3200-series cars to run 8-car trains, which had become possible after the Brown Line Capacity Expansion Project was completed in 2009.

== Issues ==
The fleet was taken out of service for inspections in December 2011 concerning irregularities found in the wheel components of the cars. They reentered service on May 7, 2012. As of November 2015, these cars are the most abundant in the CTA's fleet, making up the entire Pink, Green, Yellow, Purple, and Red Line fleets.

== Controversies ==
The 5000-series' seating arrangement has been met with negative feedback from riders. One of the requirements the CTA had during the bidding process was that manufacturers provide more than one interior layout for a hybrid seating configuration (both longitudinal and lateral), to minimize discomfort as well as maximize passenger flow.

== Accidents ==
On November 16, 2023, car 5599, in service on the Yellow Line, was approaching Howard station, when it hit snow removal equipment with 38 people on board. 23 people were injured, three seriously, but none life-threatening. The snow removal equipment was on the tracks for a planned multiple-day training in advance of snowy conditions. The cab end of the car was severely damaged, although the exact fate of the cars is unknown at this time. Yellow Line service was suspended following the accident during the NTSB's investigation.

== See also ==
- R160 (New York City Subway car)
- R179 (New York City Subway car)
