= 6000-series (CTA) =

Chicago transit car

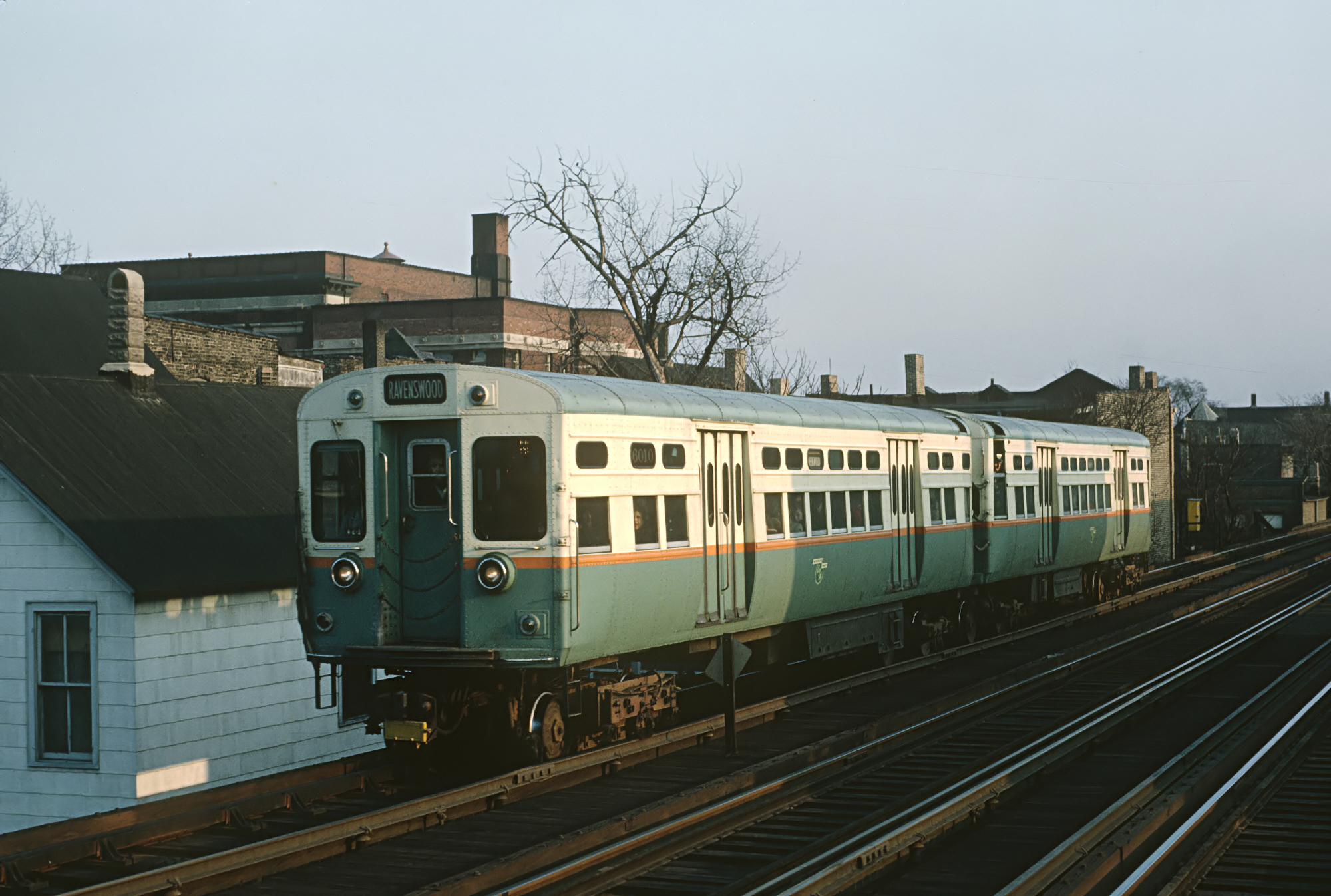
- A two-car Ravenswood train made of a 6000-series pair in April 1966
- In service: August 1950 – December 4, 1992 (42 years)
- Manufacturer: St. Louis Car Company
- Replaced: Wooden cars
- Constructed: 1950–1959
- Entered service: 1950
- Number built: 720
- Number in service: 4 (in Heritage Fleet service)
- Number preserved: 17
- Number scrapped: 700
- Successor: 2600-series, 3200-series
- Fleet numbers: 6001–6720
- Capacity: 47 (A unit), 51 (B unit)
- Operators: Chicago Transit Authority, SEPTA

Specifications
- Car length: 48 ft (14.63 m)
- Width: 9 ft 4 in (2.84 m)
- Height: 11 ft 10 1/8 in (3.61 m)
- Entry: Level
- Doors: 4 (2 per side)
- Maximum speed: 50 mph (80 km/h)
- Weight: 41,700 lb (18,900 kg)
- Traction motors: 4 × GE 1220 or Westinghouse 1432 55 hp (41 kW) DC motor
- Power output: 220 hp (160 kW)
- Electric systems: Third rail, 600 V DC
- Current collection: Contact shoe
- Track gauge: 4 ft 8 1/2 in (1,435 mm) standard gauge

The 6000-series was a series of "L" cars built between 1950 and 1959 by the St. Louis Car Company for the Chicago Transit Authority. A total of 720 cars were produced, and remained in operation on the "L" until 1992.

== Design ==
In 1947–1948 the Chicago Transit Authority received four three-car articulated trainsets, 5001–5004, to test PCC technology in rapid transit use. Two sets of cars were built by Pullman, two by St. Louis Car, with equipment supplied by competing suppliers, in order to test them directly against each other. The 6000-series was designed with knowledge from the 5000-series. The design would influence the G series for the Toronto subway.

=== Bodies ===
5000-series bodies had a curved profile previously used by North Shore Line and then Chicago, Aurora & Elgin cars which operated on the "L". The floor width was the 8 ft 8 in (2.64 m) needed for platform clearance, then above the sides curved outward, so the car was wider at seat level. This profile was used, 6000-series cars were 8 in (20 cm) wider at the seats than the floor. Blinker doors, which swing on an arc and open inward, were also successful and were used in the 6000-series. The doors on cars 6001 through 6200 were "flat" and vertical, while those on cars 6201 and above were curved and flush with the car body.

Articulation was not repeated; the 6000s were individual cars semi-permanently attached in married pairs. The outside end of both cars had a cab, making a two-car double-ended arrangement. This has become the CTA standard.

St. Louis Car Company built all 6000-series cars, as well as their single car variant 1-50 series, many with components salvaged from Pullman streetcars, starting with car No 6201 and continuing until the end of production.

=== Driveline ===
The 5000s had modified Clark and St. Louis trucks with 28 in (711 mm) wheels designed for high speeds. The 6000s had more standard streetcar trucks, with 26 in (660 mm) wheels. These had a top speed of 50, which was adequate for CTA needs until the high-speed Skokie Swift shuttle started in 1964.

The first 200 cars were built with new components, including Clark B-2 trucks, the next 310 cars had Clark B-2s salvaged from Pullman streetcars, and the final 210, plus most of the similar 1-50 class, had St Louis B-3s salvaged from St Louis streetcars.

All cars had Westinghouse XDA1 controls. 6001–6488 had Westinghouse 1432 motors, all following cars had General Electric 1220 motors. Both type motors delivered 220 hp (160 kW). The exceptions are test cars 6127–6130, which had non-standard equipment and higher performance.

== Routes ==
The 6000-series became the standard of the system, and were used almost everywhere. In 1975 there were still over 700 6000s in service.

Initially, all of the first 130 6000s were assigned to the Logan Square line. The North-South and Ravenswood lines had 6000s in service in 1952 (with the 4000-series cars taking the 6000s' place on the Logan Square line); other lines (except the Lake Street line, presumably due to width clearance issues on the at-grade section of the line west of Laramie Avenue, which was also powered by overhead wire) received cars when they became available.

Because of overhead wire, no 6000s were used on the Skokie or Evanston lines, except 6127–6130, which received trolley poles for express service on the Evanston line. (The western section of the Lake line was elevated in 1962; however, it remained equipped entirely with 4000s until the arrival of the 2000-series cars from Pullman-Standard in 1964.) Two of the routes that the 6000s were not used on were served by their single car variants, the 1-50 series. The Evanston line began to receive additional 6000s after it converted entirely from overhead wire to third rail in 1973.

When the Dan Ryan line was opened in 1969, newer cars were assigned there, but 6000s were sometimes used for special movements.

CTA sold some of the cars to SEPTA for use on the Norristown High Speed Line during the delay of the N-5 car delivery.

== Retirement & Preservation ==
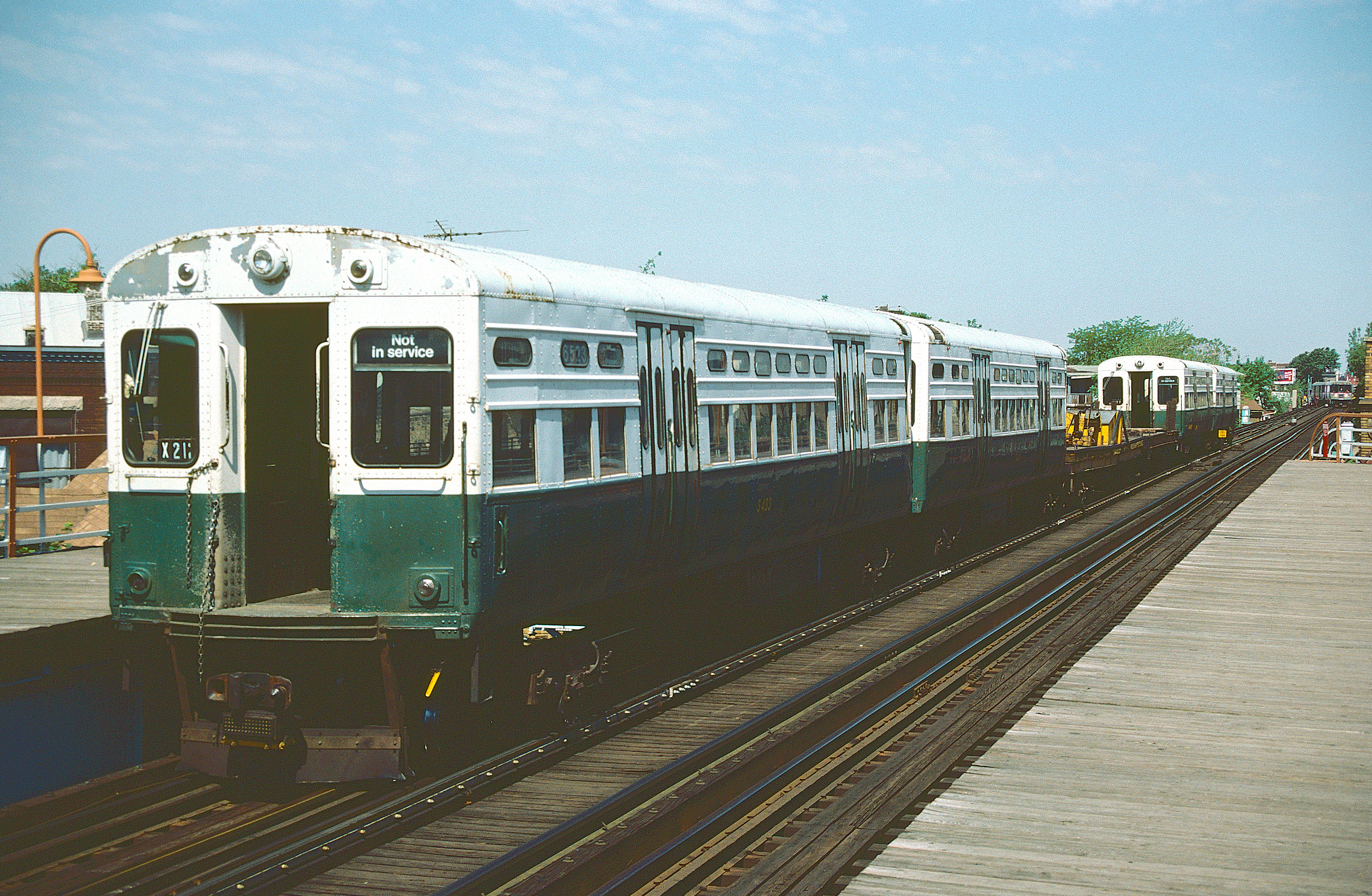
6000-series work train at California on the O'Hare branch on May 19, 1985.

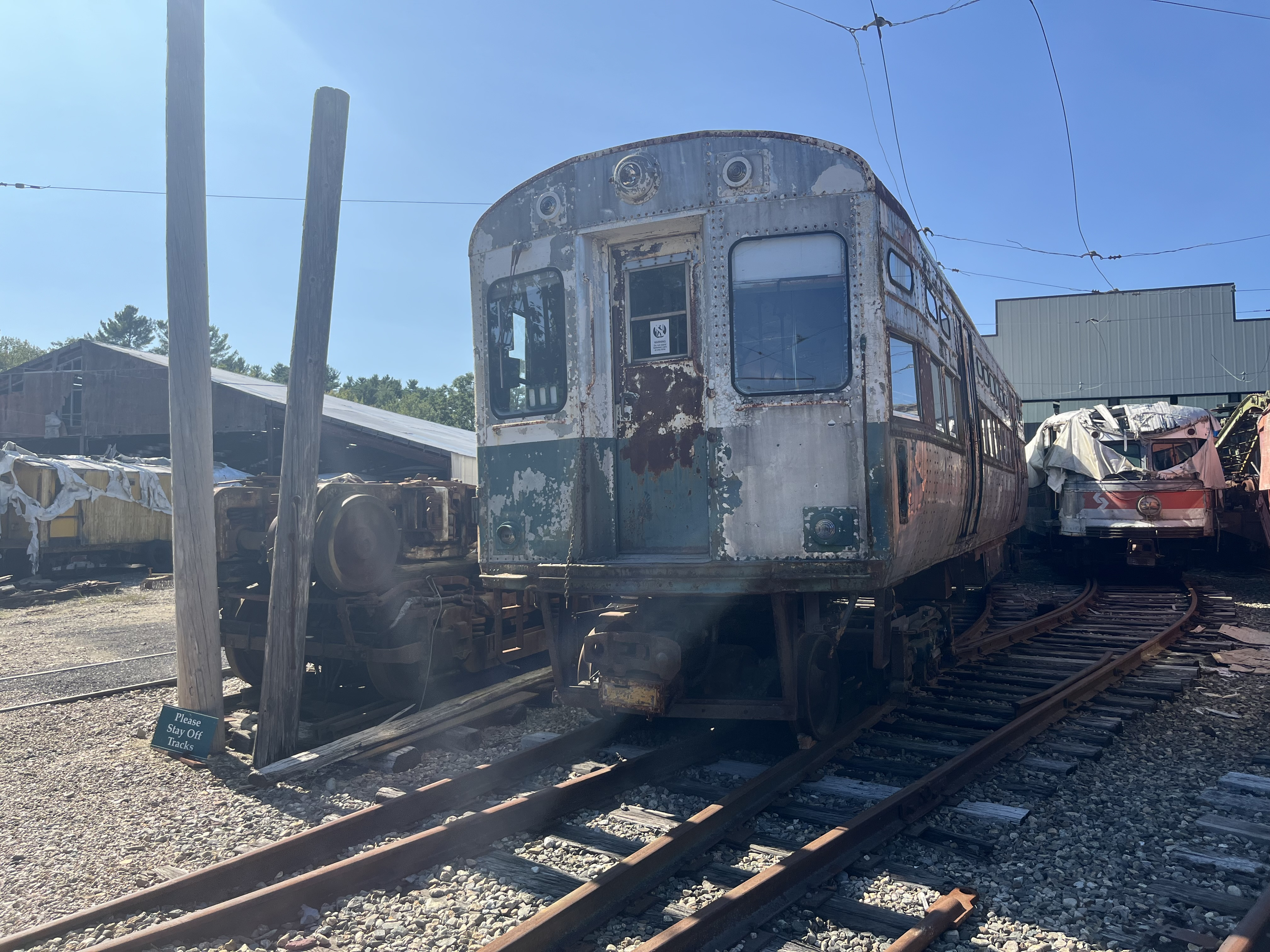
Cars 6599-6600 at the Seashore Trolley Museum in August 2024

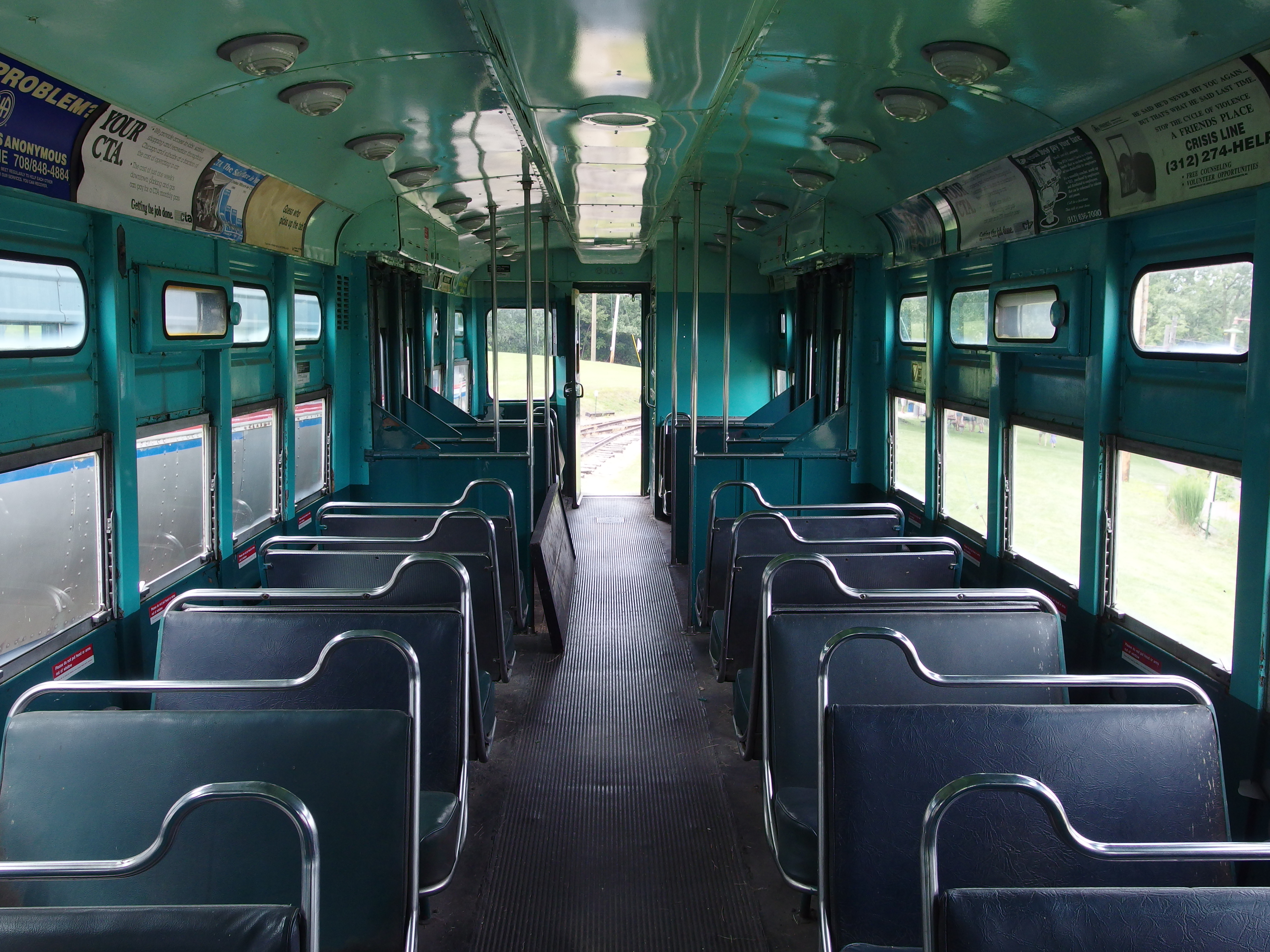
Interior of car 6101 at the Fox River Trolley Museum in August 2014.

The last of the 6000-series cars were retired on December 4, 1992; the oldest had a service life of 42 years. Some were repurposed as work motors.

Several cars have been preserved:

- 6101-6102, 6711-6712, Stored at CTA's Skokie Shops as part of the CTA's Heritage Fleet. 6101-6102 was formerly preserved at the Fox River Trolley Museum and 6711-6712 was formerly preserved at the National Museum of Transportation, both pairs were re-acquired by CTA in 2017.
- 6599-6600, stored at the Seashore Trolley Museum in Kennebunkport, Maine, pending restoration.
- 6719, used for the exhibit America on the Move at the National Museum of American History.
- 6655-6656, 6461-6462, 6125-6126, preserved by the Illinois Railway Museum in Union, Illinois.
- 6069-6070 (As SEPTA 476-477), preserved by the Fox River Trolley Museum in South Elgin, Illinois. the pair was owned by Middletown & Hummelstown Railroad until May of 2026.
- 6089-6090 (As SEPTA 482-483), displayed at the Craggy Mountain Line in Woodfin, North Carolina
