= SNCF class 141TB =

141.TB. in SNCF's classification system could refer to:

- 1–141.TB, ex Est 4401 to 4512
- 2–141.TB, ex Nord 4.1701 and 4.1702
- 3–141.TB, ex État 42–401 to 42-407, exx PO 5616-series
- 4–141.TB, ex PO-Midi 141.616 to 141.740, exx PO 5616 to 5740
