= 2200-series (CTA) =

Class of Chicago 'L' rail cars

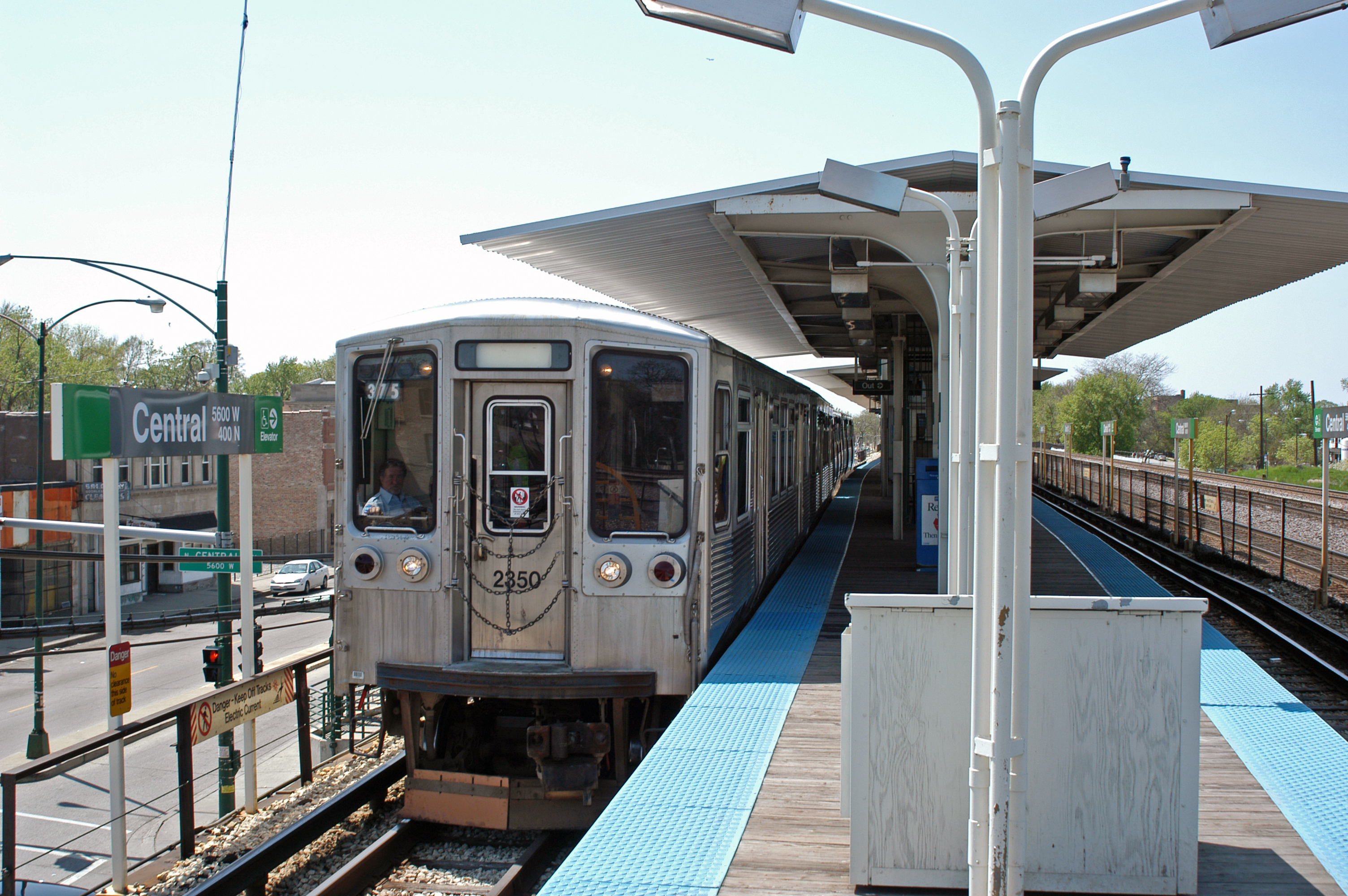
- CTA 2200 series train at Central station
- In service: September 28, 1969 – August 8, 2013 (44 years)
- Manufacturer: Budd Company
- Built at: Red Lion Plant, Philadelphia, Pennsylvania
- Family name: High Performance
- Constructed: 1969–1970
- Entered service: 1969
- Refurbished: 1990–1992
- Scrapped: 2012–2014
- Number built: 150
- Number preserved: 9
- Number scrapped: 139
- Successor: 5000-series
- Formation: Married pair
- Fleet numbers: 2201–2350; 2351 (renumbered from 2307); 2352 (renumbered from 2316)
- Capacity: 42 (A car) or 46 (B car) seated
- Operator: Chicago Transit Authority

Specifications
- Car body construction: Stainless steel with fiberglass end window and headlight masks
- Car length: 48 feet (14.63 m)
- Width: 9 feet 4 inches (2.84 m)
- Height: 12 feet (3.66 m)
- Doors: 4 per car
- Maximum speed: Design: 70 mph (110 km/h); Service: 55 mph (89 km/h)
- Weight: 47,400 pounds (21,500 kg)
- Electric systems: Third rail, 600 V DC
- Current collection: Contact shoe
- UIC classification: Bo’Bo’+Bo’Bo’
- AAR wheel arrangement: B-B+B-B
- Braking systems: Regenerative and disc brakes
- Track gauge: 4 ft 8 1/2 in (1,435 mm) standard gauge

The 2200-series was a series of Chicago "L" cars built in 1969 and 1970 by the Budd Company of Philadelphia, Pennsylvania. 150 cars were built. The last 8 2200-series cars were retired from service after their ceremonial last trips on the Blue Line on August 8, 2013. These cars were in service for 44 years. All cars except the preserved ones were scrapped by October 2015.

The 2200-series was the second of five series of Chicago "L" cars known as the High Performance Family.

These cars were used for the Lake-Dan Ryan and West-Northwest routes, From 1993 to 2013, these cars were used on the Blue Line with the 2600-series cars. From 2006 to 2008, these cars were used on the Pink Line with the 2600-series cars.

== History ==
In 1967, the City of Chicago began construction on two rapid transit projects, both in the median of two expressways, the Dan Ryan and the Kennedy. These two projects needed an order of new rail cars to supplement the existing fleet, and the City of Chicago ordered 150 new rail cars from the Budd Company for the two projects. The city retained two important consultants on the projects, the Chicago Transit Authority (who would operate the cars) and the architectural firm of Skidmore, Owings and Merrill (SOM), which was heavily involved in the architectural work of the new stations. The new cars were designed to complement the modernist approach that SOM was taking to the design of the new stations, and featured unpainted fluted sides, a first for the CTA that would later become the standard for its rail fleet.

=== Service history ===
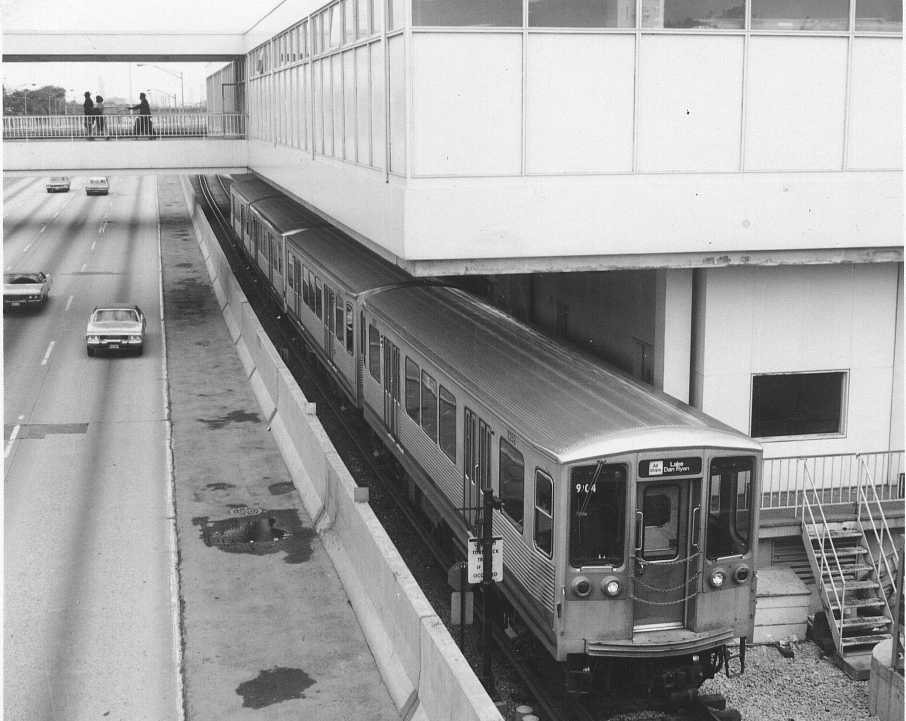
2200-Series cars in service on the Dan Ryan branch in 1973

The 2200-series cars (numbered 2201–2350) were manufactured by the Budd Company of Philadelphia, Pennsylvania and first delivered to the CTA in 1969, before the Dan Ryan branch (now known as the south end of the Red Line) opened. 150 cars were ordered, and all delivered in 1969 and 1970. In the 2000s, they were the only "L" cars to still feature the blinker door configuration, in which the doors to the train open inward into the car rather than slide horizontally. These doors, which had a much narrower opening than sliding doors, were unable to accommodate a wheelchair. Because of this, all 2200-series cars that ran in regular service on the Blue Line had to be coupled with a married pair of 2600-series cars in order to comply with the Americans with Disabilities Act of 1990. In addition, during eight car operation on the Blue Line, the CTA preferred to designate the 2200-series cars as belly cars (which meant that they were not at either end of the train), with 2600-series cars on the ends of the train.

The 2200-series also featured fluted, unpainted stainless steel sides, a unique feature in the rolling stock until the delivery of the 3200-series. Cars 2307 and 2316 were renumbered 2351 and 2352; 2351 was originally numbered 2307 and repaired after its mate 2308 was damaged in an accident at Addison station in 1976; 2352 was renumbered from 2316 and paired with 2351 after 2315 was damaged in a fire in the Skokie Shops yard in November 1977.

Cars 2289 and 2290 were damaged in the 1977 Chicago Loop derailment on February 4, 1977. After the derailment cars 2289 and 2290 were later retired and scrapped.

The cars were rebuilt by the New York Rail Car Corporation of Brooklyn, New York, from 1990 until 1992, to extend their service life.

=== Retirement ===
Retirement of the 2200-series cars began in October 2010 and was completed in August 2013, when the last eight 2200-series cars were retired from service after ceremonial last trips on the Blue Line on August 8, 2013. 144 of the 150 cars built remained in service into the 21st century. An additional farewell tour of the 2200-series cars took place on a 6-car private charter ran by Eric Zabelny on August 25, 2013, which toured most of the CTA system. Most cars were scrapped from January 2012 to April 2014. However, several cars survive, including:

- 2231-2232, previously used by the US government in Fort McCoy, Wisconsin for training purposes. In 2025, the pair returned to the CTA and now sit in the Skokie Shops for preservation.
- 2238, owned by Lacuna 2150 operated by MODEST Skate Shop.
- 2243-2244, preserved in operating condition at the Illinois Railway Museum in Union, Illinois.
- 2273-2274, still stored on CTA property, and pending preservation.
- 2347, repurposed into a trailer for a traveling bar. It was originally expected to be used as a shop at Jungle Jim's International Market in Fairfield, Ohio, but was sold in 2018 to Goose Island Brewery.
- 2348, repurposed into lounge space at Google's headquarters in Chicago.

Car 2275 is being used by the US government in Fort McCoy, Wisconsin for training purposes. Car 2257 is being used by the Muscatatuck Urban Training Center for training purposes as well.

Car 2318 was reportedly sold to UNICOR. Additionally, cars 2258 and 2320 were used as movie props. It is unknown if these cars are still being used for these purposes.

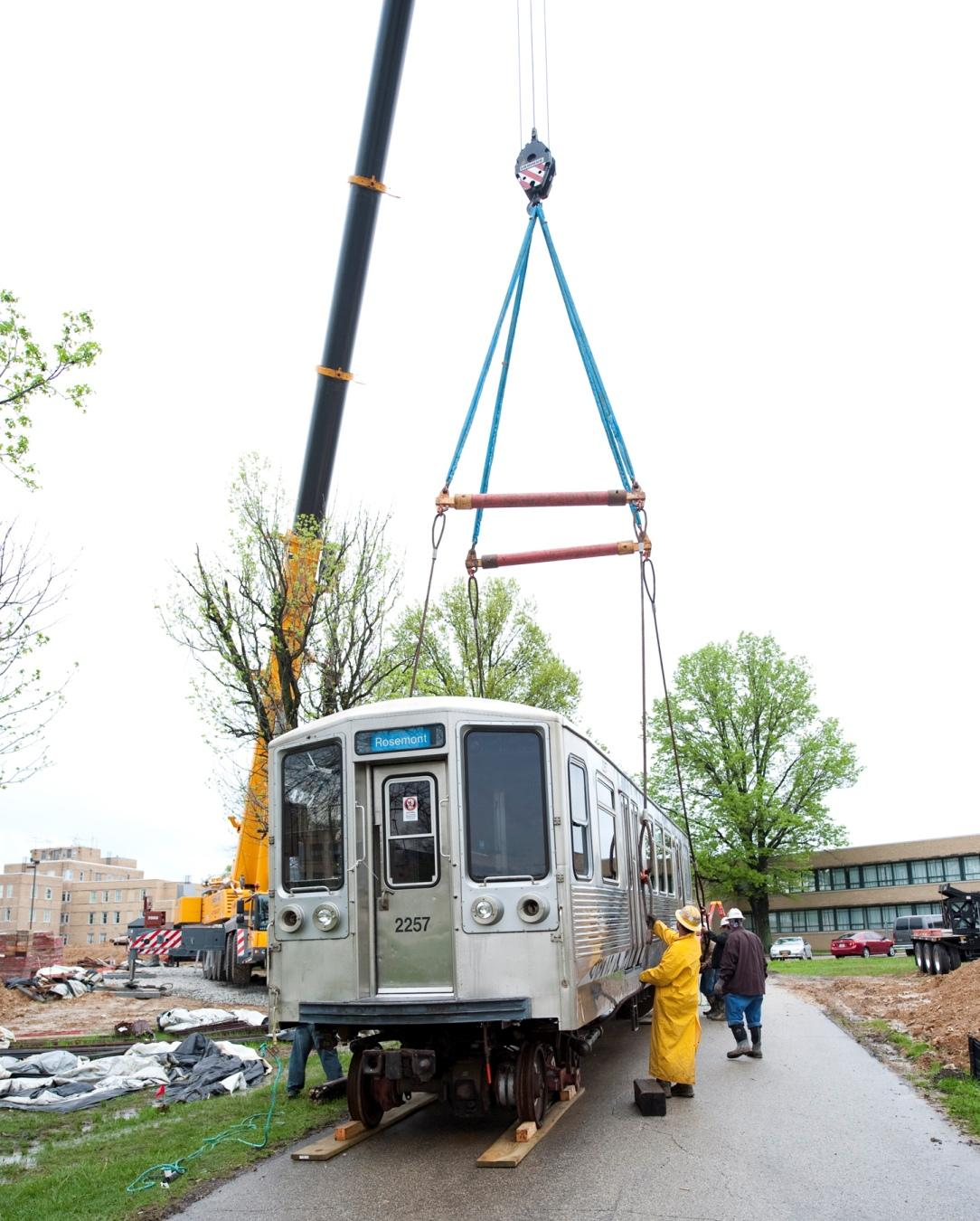
Car 2257 is prepared for installation into a mock subway station at the Muscatatuck Urban Training Center in April 2011

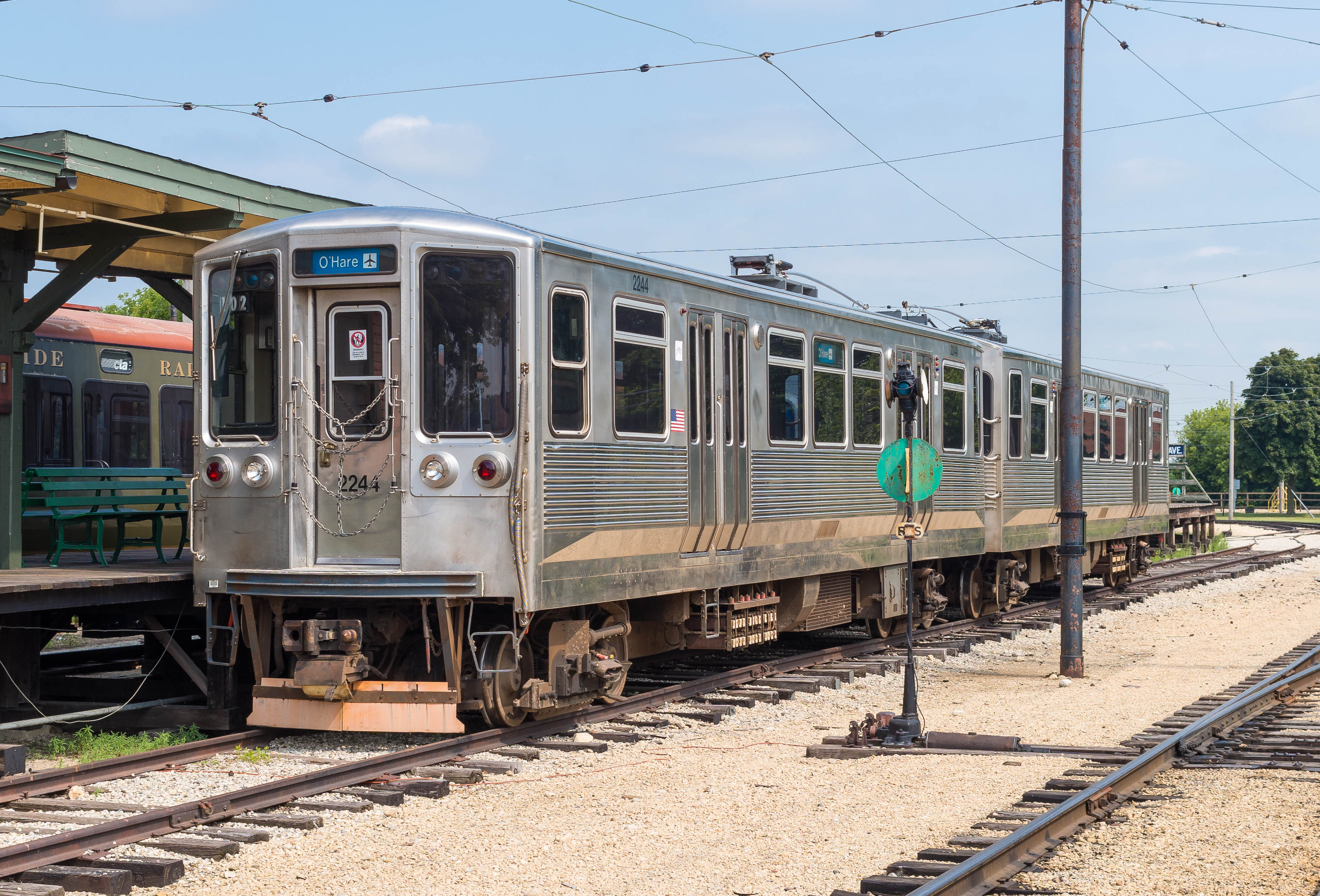
Cars 2244 and 2243 at the Illinois Railway Museum in July 2014
