= Allstate (disambiguation) =

Allstate is an American insurance company.

Allstate may also refer to:

== Sports events ==
=== American football ===
- 2008 Allstate BCS National Championship Game
- Allstate Sugar Bowl, editions of the Sugar Bowl sponsored by Allstate from 2007 to 2013, including:
  - 2008 Allstate Sugar Bowl
  - 2009 Allstate Sugar Bowl
  - 2010 Allstate Sugar Bowl

=== Auto racing ===
- Allstate 400 at the Brickyard, editions of the Brickyard 400 sponsored by Allstate from 2005 to 2009:
  - 2005 Allstate 400 at the Brickyard
  - 2006 Allstate 400 at the Brickyard
  - 2007 Allstate 400 at the Brickyard
  - 2008 Allstate 400 at the Brickyard
  - 2009 Allstate 400 at the Brickyard

== Vehicles ==
- Allstate (automobile), an American automobile offered for sale through Sears during the 1952 and 1953 model years
- Allstate (vehicle brand), an American brand of vehicles marketed by Sears circa 1948–1965

== Other uses ==
- Allstate Arena, a multi-purpose arena in Rosemont, Illinois, United States
- Allstate Insurance Co. v. Hague, a case decided by the United States Supreme Court in 1981
- Allstate Northern Ireland, a provider of technology and business services to Allstate, its parent company
- All-state, a designation in high school sports of the best players of a specific sport in a U.S. state, similar to All-America accolades at the college level
