= CTA Holiday Train =

Holiday-themed train operated on the Chicago "L"

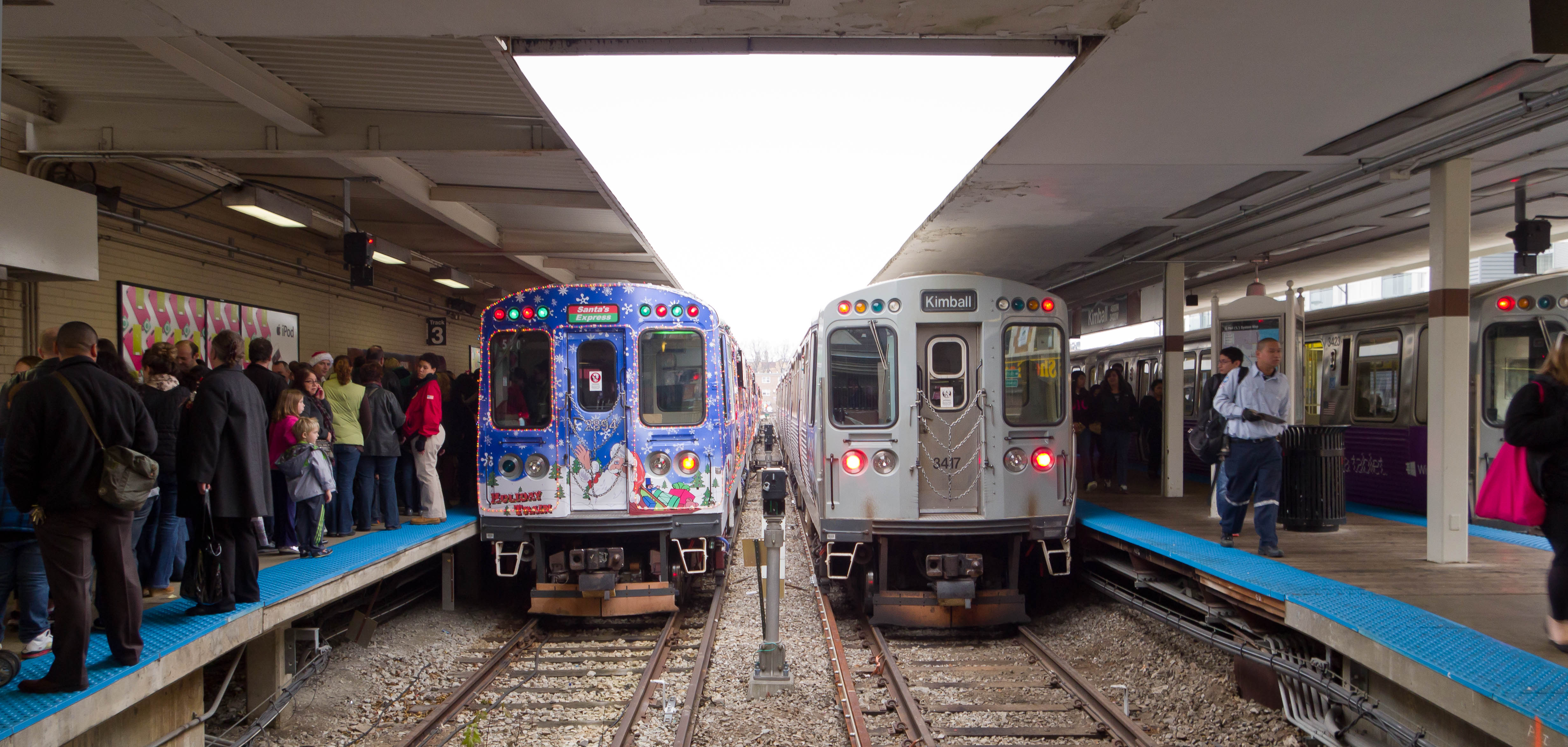
Holiday Train alongside a Brown Line train at the Kimball station in 2012

The CTA Holiday Train (Note: Officially known as the Allstate CTA Holiday Train, under a corporate sponsorship agreement.) is a special service of the Chicago "L" rail system, running annually during the Christmas and holiday season in Chicago, Illinois. The train features extensive Christmas decorations, and is a popular holiday tradition in Chicago.

== Overview ==
The Holiday Train runs in regular service across the 'L' system between late November and Christmas, visiting all 146 stations as it progresses through the system's eight lines. Each day the train is in service, it runs on either a single line or a combination of two lines, stopping at all stations. It operates as run #1225, in reference to the date of Christmas Day. CTA employees, dressed as Christmas elves, greet passengers onboard.

As of 2025, the Holiday Train runs five days a week, Tuesday through Saturday, from Black Friday until a few days before Christmas (occasionally also running on a Monday). It runs for three to four hours in the afternoon on weekdays, and for longer spans on Saturday afternoons. For the final day of each year's service, the Holiday Train is divided into three two-car trains, which run individually on the Yellow Line.

=== Rolling stock ===
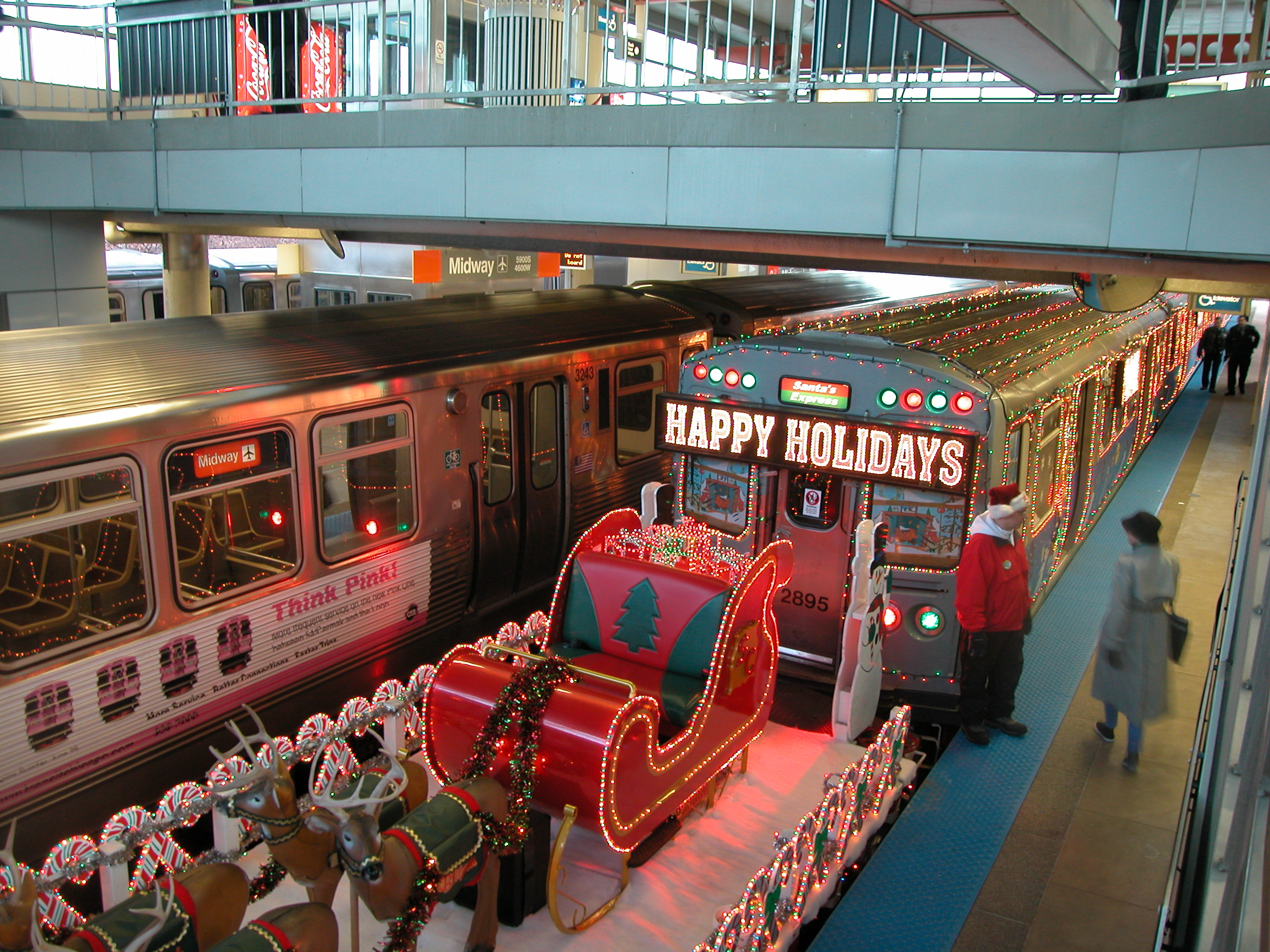
The open-air flatcar

The Holiday Train service is run with a designated seven-car train, consisting of six modified 2600-series passenger cars (units 2893-2898) interspersed with a single open-air flatcar. The passenger cars are extensively decorated with Christmas lights and stylized vinyl wraps on the interior and exterior, and red-and-green seats, bows, garlands, and other artwork on the interior. The flatcar contains a holiday-themed display featuring a CTA employee dressed as Santa Claus, greeting riders from atop a sleigh pulled by reindeer. Its headsigns read "Santa's Express," and large signs adorn the exterior, displaying holiday messages such as "peace on earth", “happy holidays”, and "seasons greetings from CTA Rail Lines." Christmas music is played from onboard speakers.

The train is decorated each fall at the Skokie Shops, and is stored there when not in use. Decorations are stored and reused from year to year. As of 2024, the train's decorations included more than 100,000 Christmas lights.

=== Elves' Workshop Train ===
From 2016 to 2019, the Holiday Train was accompanied by a second holiday-themed train, known as the Elves' Workshop Train. The Elves' Workshop Train ran exclusively on Saturdays, directly behind the main Holiday Train, to accommodate crowds. Like the Holiday Train, the Elves' Workshop Train also consisted of six decorated 2600-series railcars (units 2883-2900).

=== Holiday Bus ===
In addition to the Holiday Train, the CTA also operates a holiday-themed bus. The CTA Holiday Bus (Note: Officially known as the Allstate CTA Holiday Bus, under a corporate sponsorship agreement.) is a decorated New Flyer D60LFR articulated bus (unit 4374) decorated with lights and a vinyl wrap in a manner similar to the Holiday Train, and similarly running in regularly scheduled service on CTA bus routes. The Holiday Bus debuts each year during the Magnificent Mile Lights Festival Parade, and services 15 to 20 bus routes each year.

=== Charity support ===
The Holiday Train program has historically been used to provide food to local charities; in 2025, the CTA donated 400 food baskets.

== History ==
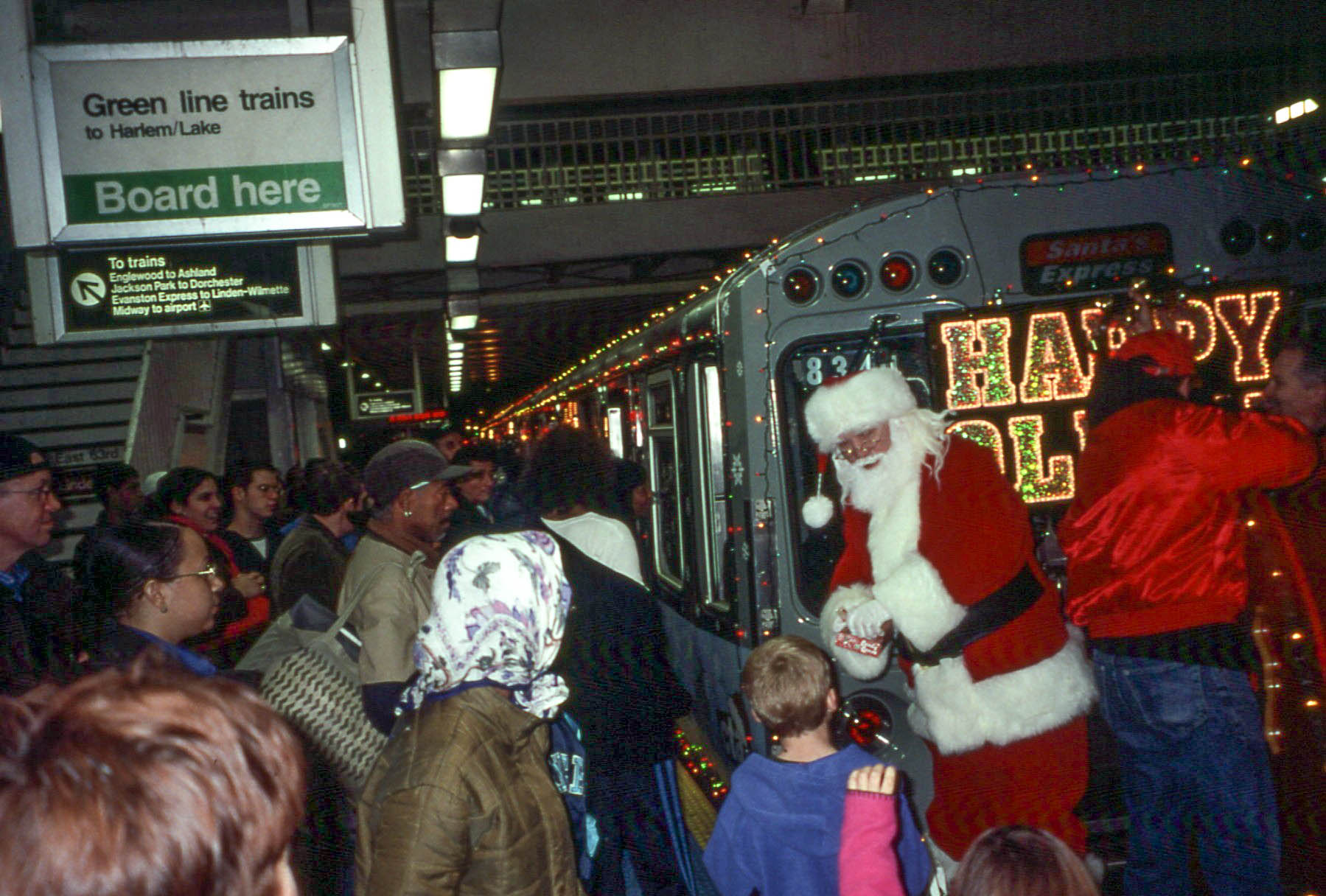
Santa Claus riding the Holiday Train in 2001

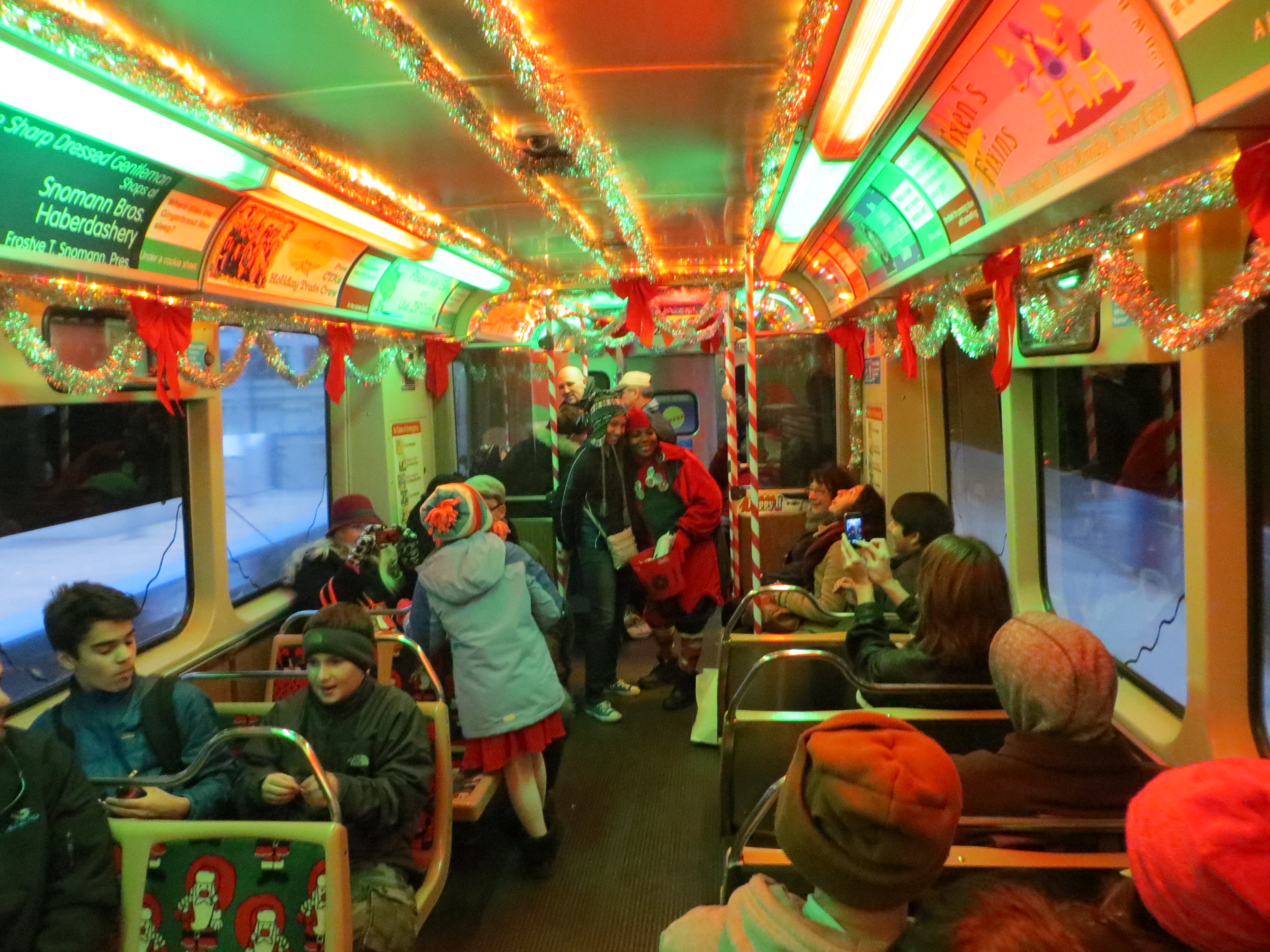
Interior in 2013

The Holiday Train began in 1992 as a decorated out-of-service train run on the Blue Line, used by CTA staff to deliver donations of food to local charities. It became a passenger service in 1996.

In 2003, the Holiday Train derailed near Sedgwick station while running on the Brown Line. Passengers were evacuated, though no one was injured.

The Holiday Train was nearly discontinued in December 2004 amid systemwide budget cuts, with then-CTA president Frank Kruesi stating that it was difficult to justify funding the program amid the threat of mass employee layoffs the following January. Kruesi was criticized for the decision, with local media comparing him unfavorably to the Grinch. The service was reinstated at the request of Carole Brown, then-chair of CTA's board of directors.

In 2014, the CTA introduced the Holiday Bus to complement the Holiday Train.

In 2016, the CTA introduced the Elves’ Workshop Train

Since the 2010s, the Holiday Train program has been funded primarily by corporate sponsors. The train and bus were sponsored by Sprint in 2015, and by Jewel-Osco in 2017. Allstate has been the title sponsor of the services since 2018.

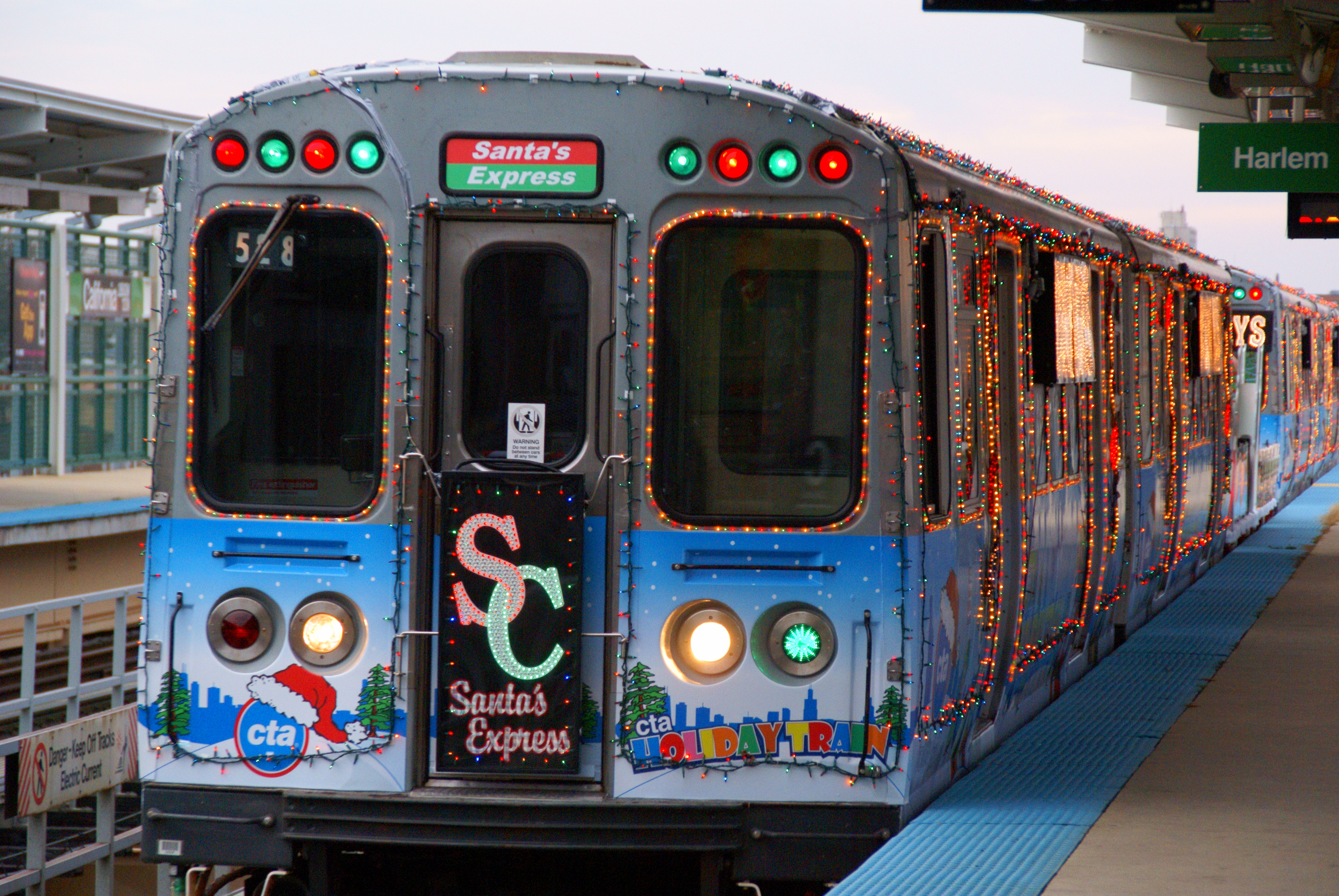
The CTA Holiday Train in 2011

Due to the COVID-19 pandemic, the Holiday Train and Bus ran without passengers in 2020.

== Reception ==
In 2009, a song titled "CTA X-mas Train", describing the Holiday Train, won a contest in the Chicago Tribune seeking a new "classic" Chicago holiday song.
