= Consumer Cellular =

American postpaid mobile virtual network operator

Consumer Cellular, Inc.
- Type: Private
- Industry: Telecommunications
- Founded: 1995; 31 years ago
- Founder: John Marick and Greg Pryor
- Headquarters: Scottsdale, Arizona, US; 33.636666°N 111.879729°W
- Area served: United States
- Owner: GTCR
- Number of employees: 3,100
- Website: consumercellular.com

Consumer Cellular, Inc. is an American postpaid mobile virtual network operator founded by John Marick and Greg Pryor in Portland, Oregon, in October 1995. The company offers cellphones, no-contract cellphone plans, and accessories with a focus on users over age 50. Including its corporate headquarters in Scottsdale, Arizona, Consumer Cellular is completely U.S. based, employing more than 3,100 people in Arizona, Oregon, Oklahoma, Kentucky and Texas.

Consumer Cellular provides wireless service using network capacity from AT&T and T-Mobile, with only AT&T being used for new activations as of 2024, and also resells AT&T wholesale wireless services to other virtual operators. The company was included on the Inc 5000 list as one of America's fastest growing companies every year between 2009 and 2020. As of August 2020, when it put itself up for sale, the company had close to 4 million subscribers. In October 2020, Chicago private equity company GTCR purchased Consumer Cellular for about $2.3 billion.

== History ==
John Marick and Greg Pryor founded Consumer Cellular in 1995 with a goal of providing low-cost service to casual mobile users of all ages. In 2008, Consumer Cellular became a preferred provider for AARP members, becoming the first cellphone company to market extensively to the over-50 demographic.

The company's first retail presence was established in 2011 with a partnership with Sears stores. In 2014, Consumer Cellular was introduced in Target stores, and in 2018 became available at select U.S. Best Buy stores. In 2013, the company introduced a smartphone financing program called EasyPay that is available to consumers purchasing smartphones that cost $200 and up. That same year, the company partnered with SquareTrade to begin providing cellphone protection plans. In May 2018, Consumer Cellular announced an investment in GrandPad and also became a distributor of the GrandPad tablet in the United States.

In February 2013, in celebration of its one millionth customer, Consumer Cellular donated $100,000 to each of five non-profit partners, and $500,000 to its employees, for a total of $1 million. To celebrate its 20th anniversary and its milestone of 2 million customers, it donated $2 million to the Knight Cancer Challenge on behalf of their customers in 2015. After reaching 2.5 million customers in the summer of 2017, it donated 2.5 million meals via Feeding America, and to mark the addition of its 3 millionth customer in October 2018, the company donated $500,000 to each of three charities selected by its employees.

In August 2019, the company celebrated its 3.5 millionth customer by donating $350,000 to the American Red Cross through the Disaster Responder Program. In the fall of 2020, to honor its 25th anniversary, Consumer Cellular donated $2.5 million to Toys for Tots. In October 2020, upon the decision of Marick and Pryor to retire, Ed Evans was installed as CEO, replacing Marick.

== Products ==
Consumer Cellular sells no-contract monthly wireless plans with cutoff points. It sells phones such as basic flip phones from Doro (of which the provider is the exclusive U.S. carrier), aimed toward seniors, as well as budget and flagship Android smartphones from Motorola and Samsung. In 2015, Consumer Cellular also began supporting the iPhone. The company expanded beyond cellphones in 2018 with the introduction of GrandPad, a simplified tablet designed for older users.

== Marketing and awards ==
Consumer Reports subscribers have rated Consumer Cellular highest in the magazine's annual review of cellphone service providers seven times. The magazine’s rankings are compiled from a survey of subscribers who grade carriers in eight different categories including value, voice and text quality, and customer support.

Consumer Cellular has been ranked by J.D. Power as "#1 in Customer Service among Non-Contract Value Wireless Providers, 10 Times in a Row". The awards are based on the results of the J.D. Power 2016 V2 - 2020 V2 U.S. Wireless Non-Contract Customer Care Performance Studies and 2021 (V1) Wireless Customer Care Mobile Virtual Network Operator Performance Study, which focus on the experiences of wireless service customers who made a sales transaction with their current carrier.

In June 2017, a consumer survey conducted by the customer experience firm Market Force Information named Consumer Cellular the favorite wireless cellphone carrier among non-contract providers for the second year in a row. Consumer Cellular came out on top for best value, best coverage, fewest dropped calls, easiest to change plan, and best flexibility, among others.

Readers polled by PC Magazine ranked Consumer Cellular as top mobile carrier in its annual "Consumer Recommended" list for 2018. The rankings were based on a company’s net promoter score, with Consumer Cellular’s score of 87 out of 100. Consumer Cellular has also been selected as "Favorite Wireless Carrier" by PC Magazine readers six years in a row in its "Reader’s Choice" survey.

In 2024, Consumer Cellular entered a sponsorship deal with NASCAR Cup Series team RFK Racing to sponsor Brad Keselowski in multiple races during the 2024 season. It has continued to sponsor Keselowski and Ryan Preece since then.

== See also ==
- List of companies based in Oregon
