= St George's Market =

Market in Belfast, Northern Ireland

Coordinates: 54.59582°N 5.92203°W

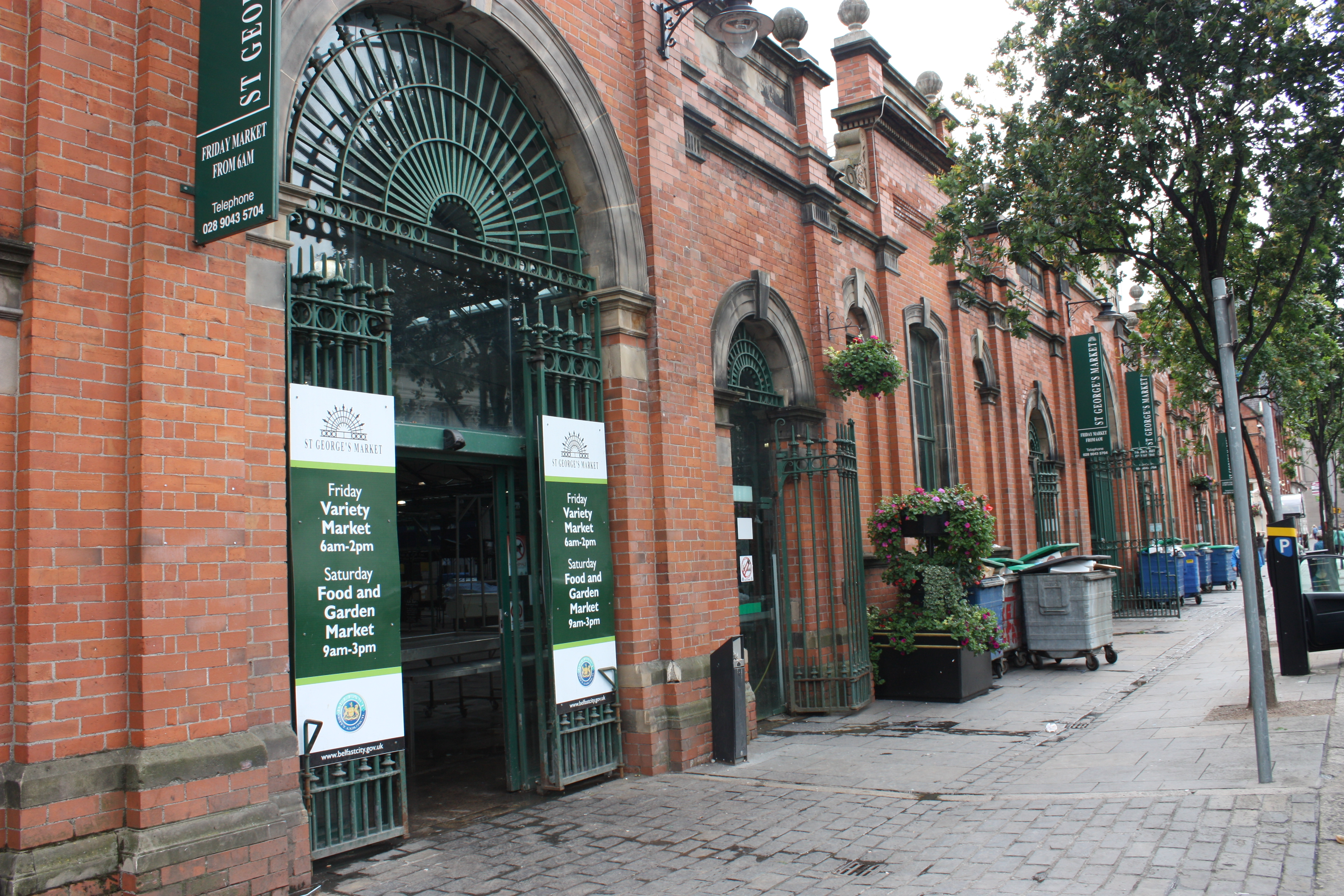
St George's Market, July 2010

St George's Market is the last surviving Victorian covered market in Belfast, Northern Ireland. It is located on May Street, close to the River Lagan and the Waterfront Hall. Belfast Corporation (now Belfast City Council) commissioned the building of St George's Market, which was built in three phases between 1890 and 1896. Before 1890 St George's Market was an open market and most likely contained a slaughterhouse and a meat market. Today it is a thriving market with 300 traders, crafters, musicians, and food vendors.

== The original market ==
The original (pre 1890) market was smaller than the new structure. The city surveyor (responsible for the new Albert Bridge following its collapse in the 1880s) JC Bretland designed the building. It was built in red brick with sandstone dressing. Externally it features Roman styled arches with Latin and Irish inscriptions – the City's Latin motto "Pro Tanto Quid Retribuamus", meaning "what shall we give in return for so much?" and the Irish phrase "Lámh Dearg na hÉireann", "Red Hand of Ireland". The main entrance arch displays the Belfast Coat of Arms. This newly covered market opened to the public on 20 June 1890.

== World War II ==
After heavy bombing of Belfast by German aircraft in World War II, St George's Market was used as an emergency mortuary. Approximately 900 were killed during the bombing raids; 255 bodies were brought to St George's Market in an attempt to identify them. Not all of the bodies were identified, so a public funeral for the unclaimed dead took place on 21 April 1941. There were separate Catholic and Protestant services held at the market and thousands of people lined the streets as the procession passed on its way to the Milltown and City cemeteries.

== Since 1980 ==
Entrance to St George's Market, September 2009

By the 1980s, St George's Market had developed into a general market and it became the last of Belfast's thriving Victorian markets. The market was pressured with increased maintenance costs and changes to hygiene regulations, among other issues, and Belfast City Council decided to source other uses for the listed building. A campaign backed by the city council, traders and the general public resulted in a Heritage Lottery Fund-backed £3.5 million refurbishment programme assisted by the Environment and Heritage Agency. Brick and stonework that had badly deteriorated was returned to good condition, and special bricks were produced in England to match the original unusually sized bricks. The fully renovated St George's Market reopened its doors on 14 May 1999.

St George's Market is primarily used as a market, however a number of other events are held at the site. These range from food festivals, art initiatives, exhibitions, charity launches, fashion shoots and live music events. Local software company Northbrook Technology hold their annual Staff Christmas Party at the venue.

The market has won a number of recent awards, including being voted Best Large Indoor Market 2014 and as one of the UK's top five markets by the National Association of British Market Authorities in 2006, and winning third place in the best markets category of the Observer Food Monthly/Waitrose Awards in 2004.

== Music venue ==
The market also regularly holds music concerts. Acts including Duffy, Newton Faulkner, Deep Purple, Kasabian, Biffy Clyro and Mark Ronson have played the venue. In March and April 2012, the venue also served as one of the main stages at the World Irish Dancing Championships, alongside the Belfast Waterfront Theatre.
