= Allstate (automobile) =

Defunct American motor vehicle manufacturer

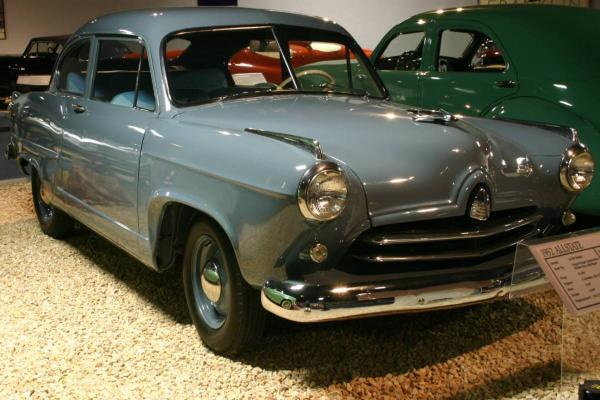
- 1952 Allstate

Overview
- Manufacturer: Kaiser-Frazer Corporation
- Production: 1952 – 1954
- Assembly: Willow Run, Michigan; Toledo, Ohio, United States

Body and chassis
- Body style: 2-door sedan
- Layout: FR layout

Powertrain
- Engine: 134.2 cu in (2.2 L) I4; 161 cu in (2.6 L) I6

Dimensions
- Wheelbase: 100 in (2,540 mm)
- Length: 178 in (4,521 mm)
- Width: 70 in (1,778 mm)

The Allstate is an American automobile offered for sale through Sears, Roebuck and Co. during the 1952 and 1953 model years. It was a rebadged version of the Henry J, a car manufactured by the Kaiser-Frazer company from 1950 through 1954.

== Background ==
The Sears retail chain previously marketed vehicles made by the Lincoln Motor Car Works under the name "Sears Motor Buggy" between 1908 and 1912. These horseless carriages were of the "high-wheeler" variety with large wagon-type wheels. Their high ground clearance was well-suited to muddy, wagon-rutted country roads. Customers were accustomed to mail ordering through the Sears catalog, and the Sears Motor Buggy could be delivered to the nearest railroad siding. A wood crate would arrive, and the customer had to install the wheels and add oil to the engine. They were treated as loss leaders, designed to enhance prestige to the Sears brand and bring publicity to the catalog retailer. Nevertheless, Sears deemed the product not profitable at $370 for the most basic model and dropped the line from the catalog after 3,500 orders.

== Development ==
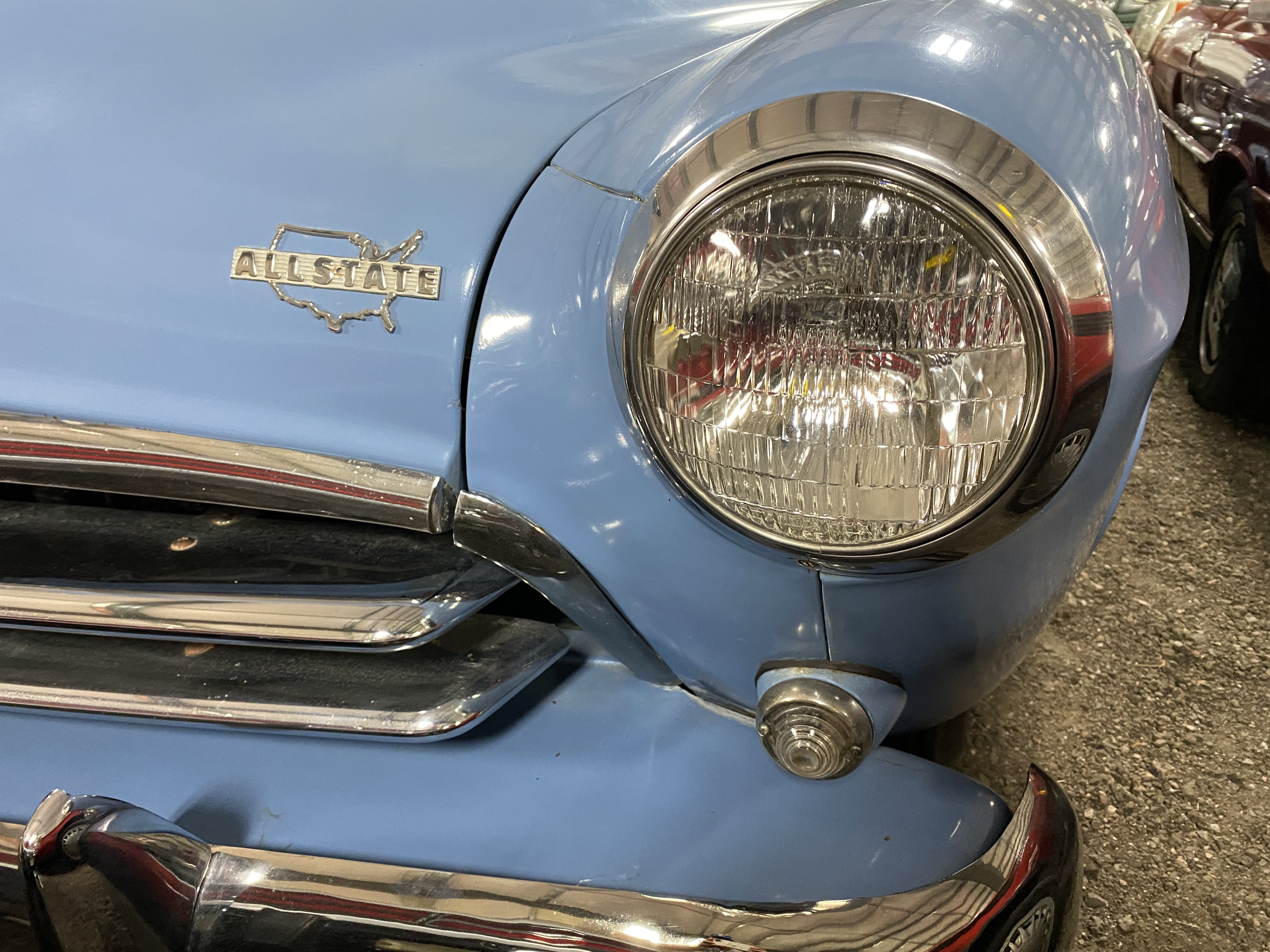
Allstate logo incorporating an outline of the contiguous United States on the hood

The Allstate car was the idea of Henry J. Kaiser, who saw distribution by Sears as another means to mass-market his slow-selling "Henry J" two-door sedan, introduced in 1950. The independent automakers at the time, such as Kaiser-Frazer, could not compete with the vast dealer networks marketing the cars made by the "Big Four" auto companies at the time. The catalog and retail chain was also interested in working out a deal.

Starting in 1945, Sears executive Theodore Houser discussed the idea with Kaiser-Frazer. Allstate automobiles were planned to be built on the senior Kaiser platforms. The concept came together after Kaiser-Frazer developed the affordable Henry J model.

Thus, after three years of negotiations between Kaiser-Frazer and Sears, Sears announced the production of the Allstate on 20 November 1951 by Sears merchandising vice president Theodore V. Houser and Kaiser-Frazer administrative vice president Eugene Trefethen. The three-year delay was also partly due to resistance from existing Kaiser-Frazer dealerships, which feared competition from Sears.

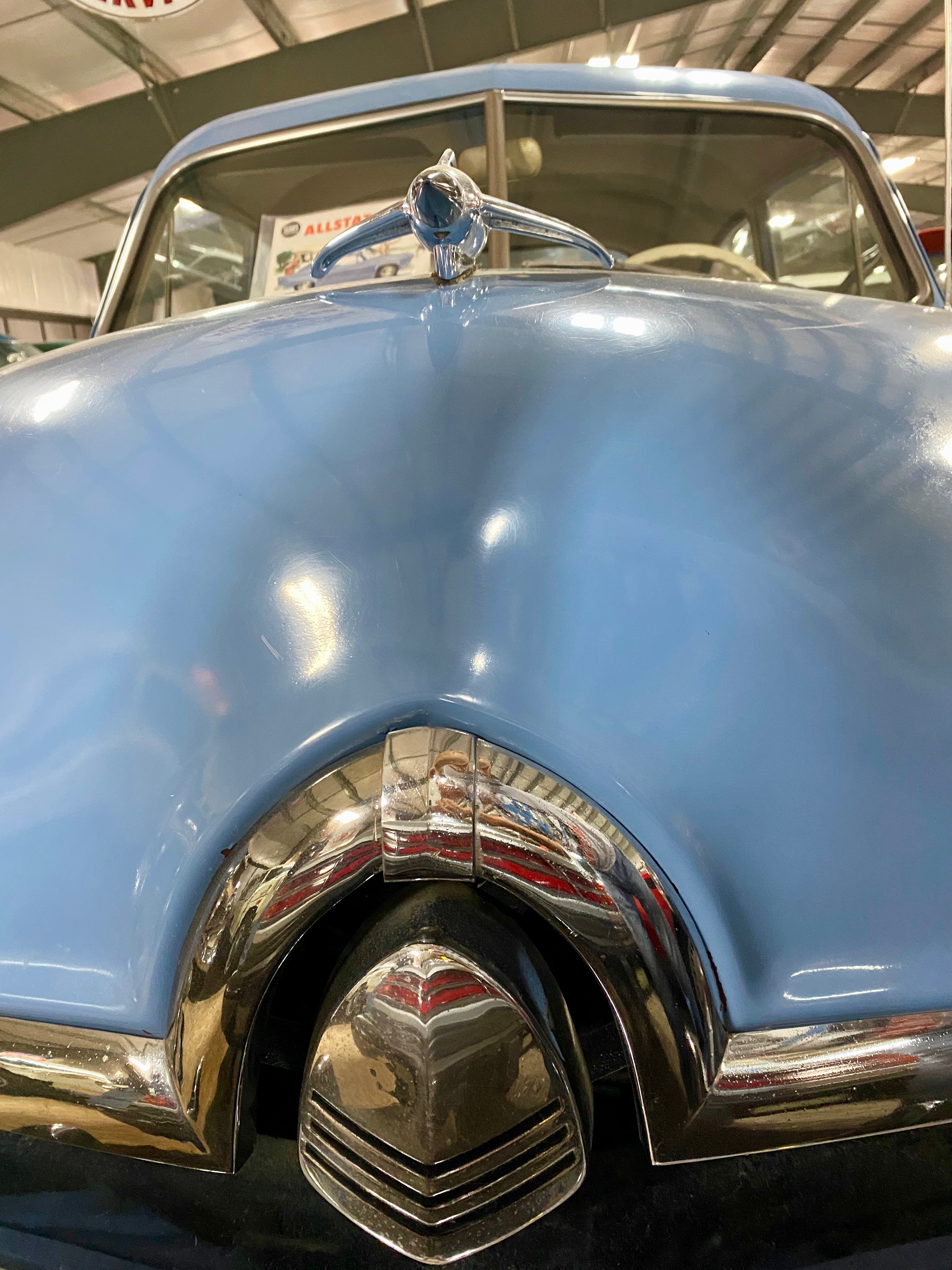
Jet plane hood ornament and center of grille

The Allstate was essentially a Henry J, but with several differences that included Allstate badges on the hood and rear deck, a more upscale interior of "Saran" plaid or occasionally leather or smooth vinyl, unique hubcaps/wheel covers, horn buttons and instrument bezels, a locking trunk lid, distinctive engine color (blue), custom armrests and sun visors, revised door locks and keys, and special parking and taillamp assemblies.

The cars were all finished in Sears-blue paint. Most notably, the Allstate featured a unique two-bar grille and jet-plane hood ornament designed by Alex Tremulis, who had come to Kaiser-Frazer from the Tucker Corporation. Tremulis described it as a "rush job," including drawing the Allstate logo, which was an outline map of the contiguous United States.

== Production ==
The Allstate was built by Kaiser-Frazer in Willow Run, Michigan (and after 1953 by Kaiser-Willys in Toledo, Ohio) and was based on Kaiser's compact Henry J. One body style was offered, a fastback two-door sedan in two trim and equipment levels, Series 4 and Series 6.

Series 4 cars included a 134.2 cu in (2.2 L) L-head I4 engine producing 68 hp (51 kW), and the Series 6 was powered by a 161 cu in (2.6 L) L-head I6 rated at 80 hp (60 kW), both built by Willys. A three-speed manual transmission was standard, with overdrive available for an additional $104.

For 1952, the Series 4 came in the Model 111 Standard (the bestseller at $1,486), the Model 113 DeLuxe ($1,539), and the austere Model 110 Basic ($1,395). The Series 6 Basic was priced at $1,594, and the better-trimmed, swift Model 115 DeLuxe was offered at $1,693. (The Standard was not offered in the Series 6.) The cars had a 100 in (2,540 mm) wheelbase. The marketing slogan was "Your one brand new car for '52! Allstate!"

The standard Allstate interior material was made from tightly twisted strands of paper woven together and then coated with plastic, which proved to be unusually durable and attractive. This enhancement eliminated the need for seat covers. Aftermarket seat covers were popular accessories for all cars in the 1950s; many were made of this material to provide durability.

Unlike early Henry Js, which were built without trunk lids to reduce costs, the Allstates featured a regular opening trunk lid. A unique factory-furnished component difference between Allstate and Henry J was that Allstates were equipped with Sears' Allstate-brand tires, tubes, spark plugs, and batteries, all with the retailer's "Triple Guarantee" warranties.

No appearance changes were made for 1953, but the new Allstate cars weighed up to 145 lb (66 kg) more than their 1952 counterparts.

Sears dropped marketing the Allstate Basic models for 1953. Thus, prices increased substantially; the entry-level Series 4 Standard Model 210 sold for $1,528 and the DeLuxe Model 213 for $1,589. The Series 6 was now offered only in the upscale DeLuxe Model 215 at $1,785, and it was the most popular Allstate version that year.

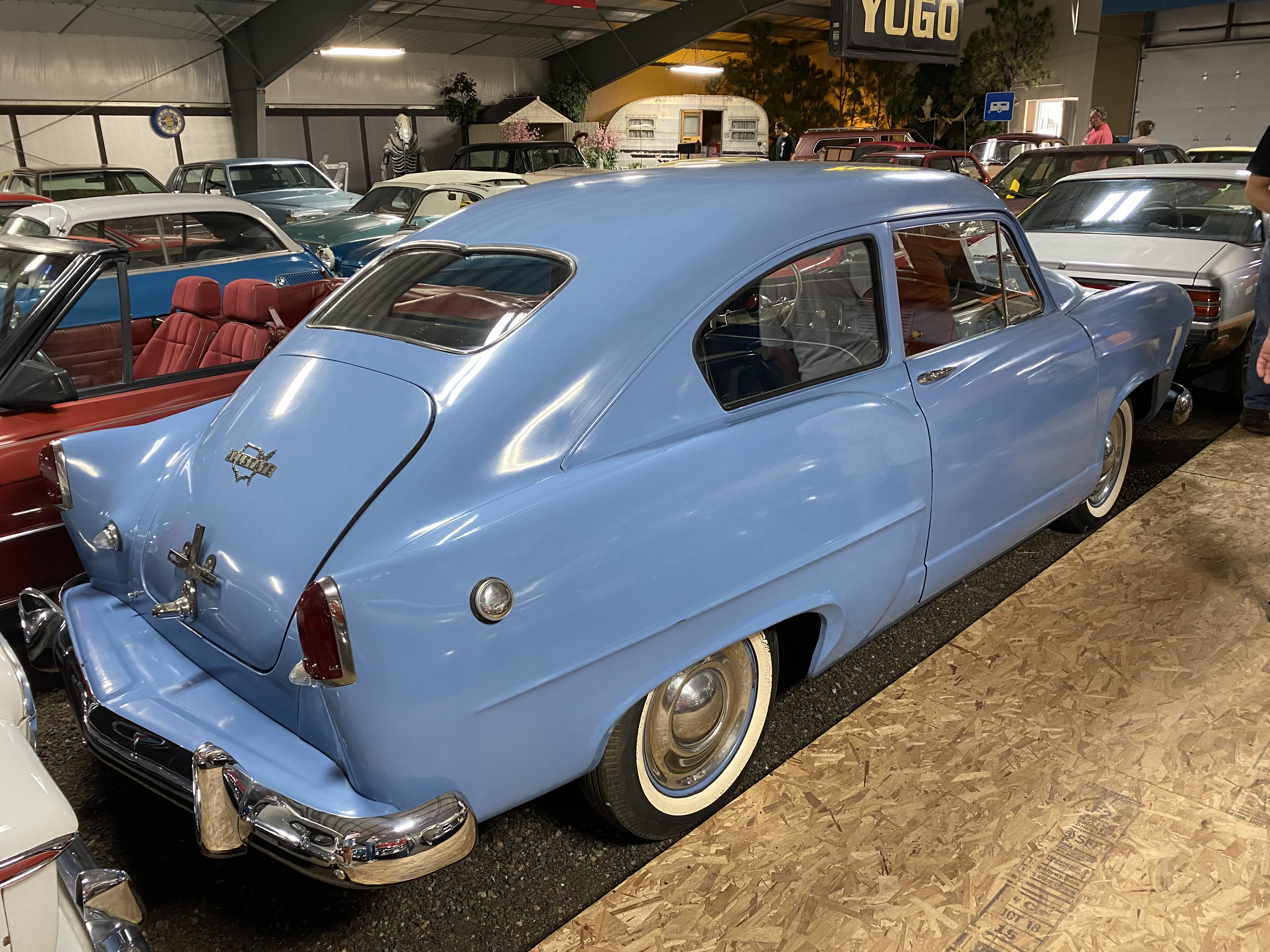
1953 Allstate with the opening trunk lid at the Rambler Ranch collection

Initially, the Allstate was offered only in the South and Southwest United States, with plans to expand distribution as demand for the product grew. Sears locations selling Allstates included Baytown, Texas; Beaumont, Texas; Birmingham, Alabama; Dallas, Texas; Fayetteville, North Carolina; Houston, Texas; Jackson, Mississippi; Knoxville, Tennessee; Little Rock, Arkansas; Lubbock, Texas; Memphis, Tennessee; Norfolk, Virginia; Orlando, Florida; Phoenix, Arizona; Portsmouth, Virginia; Richmond, Virginia; Salt Lake City, Utah; and Waco, Texas.

While some Sears outlets tried to stock at least one sample of the car, most were built to order by Kaiser-Frazer and delivered directly to the stores where they were sold. The automaker also urged its franchised dealers to service Allstate cars when owners requested it. However, many Kaiser-Frazer dealers were displeased to see "their cars" sold by another outlet, especially since the Allstate carried more standard equipment, yet sold at a lower price than the Henry J.

== Epilogue ==
Sears marketed the car as the lowest-priced full-sized sedan on the U.S. market. The removal of material restrictions following the Korean War in March 1953 impacted the smaller domestic automakers. Following the removal of government controls on materials in March 1953, managers at Ford wanted to out-produce Chevrolet, and a sales war ensued among the "Big Three" automakers (General Motors, Ford, and Chrysler) for market share. Furthermore, Kaiser's effort to boost sales in the low-priced market segment came at a time when consumers were demanding bigger cars.

Unlike the traditional automobile dealers, Sears did not accept trade-ins from Allstate buyers. The lack of a trade-in program was similar to the serious impediment Sears faced in marketing the Graham-Bradley tractors built by Graham-Paige Motors in the late 1930s. In this case, Graham-Bradley did not have a dealer organization for sales and service and contracted with Sears to market their tractors through their stores and catalog. There may also have been reluctance by consumers to buy a car from a department store, where service may have been considered questionable.

A total of 2,363 Allstate cars were sold during two model years before Sears discontinued the marque: 1,566 during 1952 and 797 in 1953. Kaiser discontinued the Henry J the following year.

The Allstate has become a car desired by collectors as reflected in the few remaining examples in original condition and by their current market values. As of 2022, a restored 1953 Allstate was on display in the corporate building of Allstate in Northbrook, IL.

== See also ==
- Allstate (vehicle brand) other vehicles marketed by Sears.
