= National General Insurance =

Insurance company in North Carolina, US

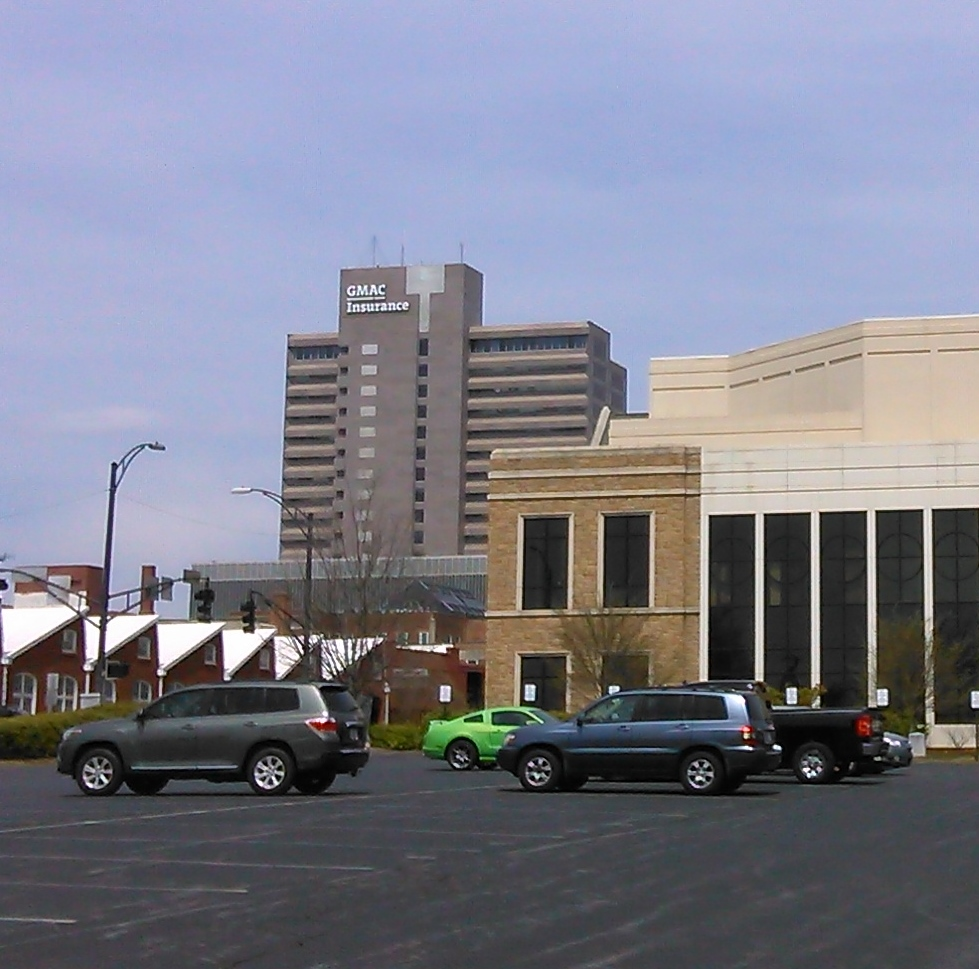
- Type: Subsidiary
- Industry: Insurance, finance
- Founded: 1920; 106 years ago
- Headquarters: Winston-Salem, North Carolina, U.S.
- Products: Vehicle insurance, Home insurance
- Revenue: US$5.0 billion 2018
- Number of employees: 8,440 (2019)
- Parent: Allstate

National General Insurance, formerly the GMAC Insurance Group is a Winston-Salem, North Carolina–based property and casualty insurance company. The company was founded in 1920. The company is the only insurance company in the United States to originate within the automotive industry.

The holding company for National General Insurance Personal Lines is National General Holdings Corp. As of August 2016, the company was owned by Barry Karfunkel and his family. Barry Karfunkel became the president of the company when Michael Karfunkel died.

== History ==
One of the two companies that became National General Insurance was life insurance company Integon, founded in Winston-Salem, North Carolina, in 1920. The second company was Motors Insurance Company, founded in 1925 by General Motors. It was seen as a way to offer damage coverage to GM vehicles sold by dealers and financed by GMAC (now Ally Financial).

In 1969, Integon Corp. started a holding company and began insuring high-risk drivers. Integon underwent a number of changes in ownership and business emphases and struggled during the mid-1990s, which included the 1994 purchase of Bankers and Shippers Insurance Company, headquartered in Burlington, North Carolina. In June 1997, GMAC announced they were acquiring Integon in a deal valued at $550 million. When the deal finally closed in October 1997, it was for $778M. In 2000, Integon became GMAC Insurance Personal Lines.

In 2006, General Motors sold 51% of GMAC (now Ally Financial) to an affiliate of Cerberus Capital Management; at the time, 1,179 worked in Winston-Salem.

In 2009, American Capital Acquisition Corp., a unit of American Capital Partners LLC of Hauppauge, New York bought GMAC's U.S. consumer property-casualty insurance business GMAC Insurance Holdings, Inc.

On July 1, 2013, GMAC Insurance changed its name to National General Insurance. The Winston-Salem operation moved from downtown to Madison Park in June 2014.

In July 2020, Allstate announced it was acquiring National General for $4 billion. The deal closed in January 2021.
