= Skokie Shops =

Chicago "L" rail yard and shops

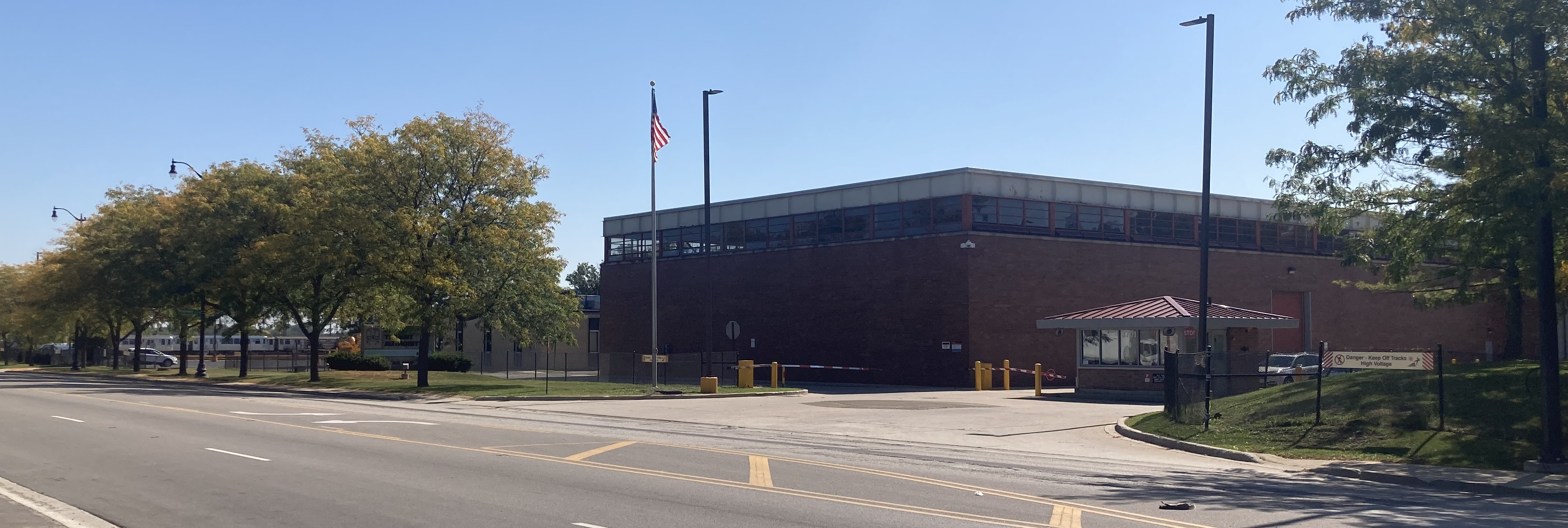
- Main gate of the Skokie Shops on Oakton Street
- Interactive map of Skokie Shops

Location
- Location: 3701 Oakton Street, Skokie, Illinois
- Coordinates: 42°01′30″N 87°43′21″W

Characteristics
- Owner: Chicago Transit Authority
- Type: Rapid transit
- Rolling stock: 5000-series
- Routes served: Yellow

History
- Opened: 1926; 100 years ago

Skokie Shops is a heavy maintenance facility for the Chicago "L" system, operated by the Chicago Transit Authority and located in Skokie, Illinois. The Skokie Shops are equipped to perform comprehensive inspection, servicing, and rebuilding for the CTA's fleet of railcars.

The shops opened in 1926 along the Chicago North Shore and Milwaukee Railroad's Skokie Valley Route, part of which also had local service provided by the Chicago Rapid Transit Company. The CRT used the Skokie Shops to maintain its fleet for the Chicago "L", and the CTA (its successor) continued to use the shops after "L" service to Skokie ended in 1948. The shops are connected to the "L" system by the present-day Yellow Line, which began operation in 1964.

== Services ==
The Skokie Shops are the CTA's main heavy maintenance facility for "L" trains used in revenue (passenger-carrying) service. The shops employ a staff of skilled tradespeople, including electricians, carpenters, machinists, and blacksmiths.

The Skokie Shops are equipped to perform comprehensive heavy maintenance on "L" trains, including collision repairs and mid-life overhauls. The shops feature heavy machinery for removing, inspecting, pressing, and truing train wheels.

The CTA Holiday Train is decorated and assembled at the Skokie Shops. The Holiday Train features a custom-built sleigh for Santa Claus, which rides on a flatcar in the middle of the train as it travels around the "L" system. Preparation work for the train takes approximately three months, supported by Skokie Shops staff and CTA employee volunteers.

== History ==
The Skokie Shops were built in the mid-1920s, as part of a partnership between the Chicago Rapid Transit Company and the Chicago North Shore and Milwaukee Railroad. Both the CRT and the CNS&M were partially controlled by businessman Samuel Insull, who led the consolidation of the entire Chicago "L" system in the early 1920s, and who also invested in utilities and property development throughout the region.

The CRT began operating local passenger service over the CNS&M's newly constructed Skokie Valley Route in 1925. Service operated between Dempster Street station and Howard Street station, with 7 intermediate stops. The CRT opened the Skokie Shops shortly afterwards to service its fleet of cars, supplementing its facilities elsewhere in the "L" system. The CNS&M operated interurban service from Chicago to Milwaukee, and used the Skokie Valley Route as a high-speed bypass of its congested main line through downtown Evanston. During the early years of interurban service on the Skokie Valley Route, the Skokie Shops also serviced CNS&M cars.

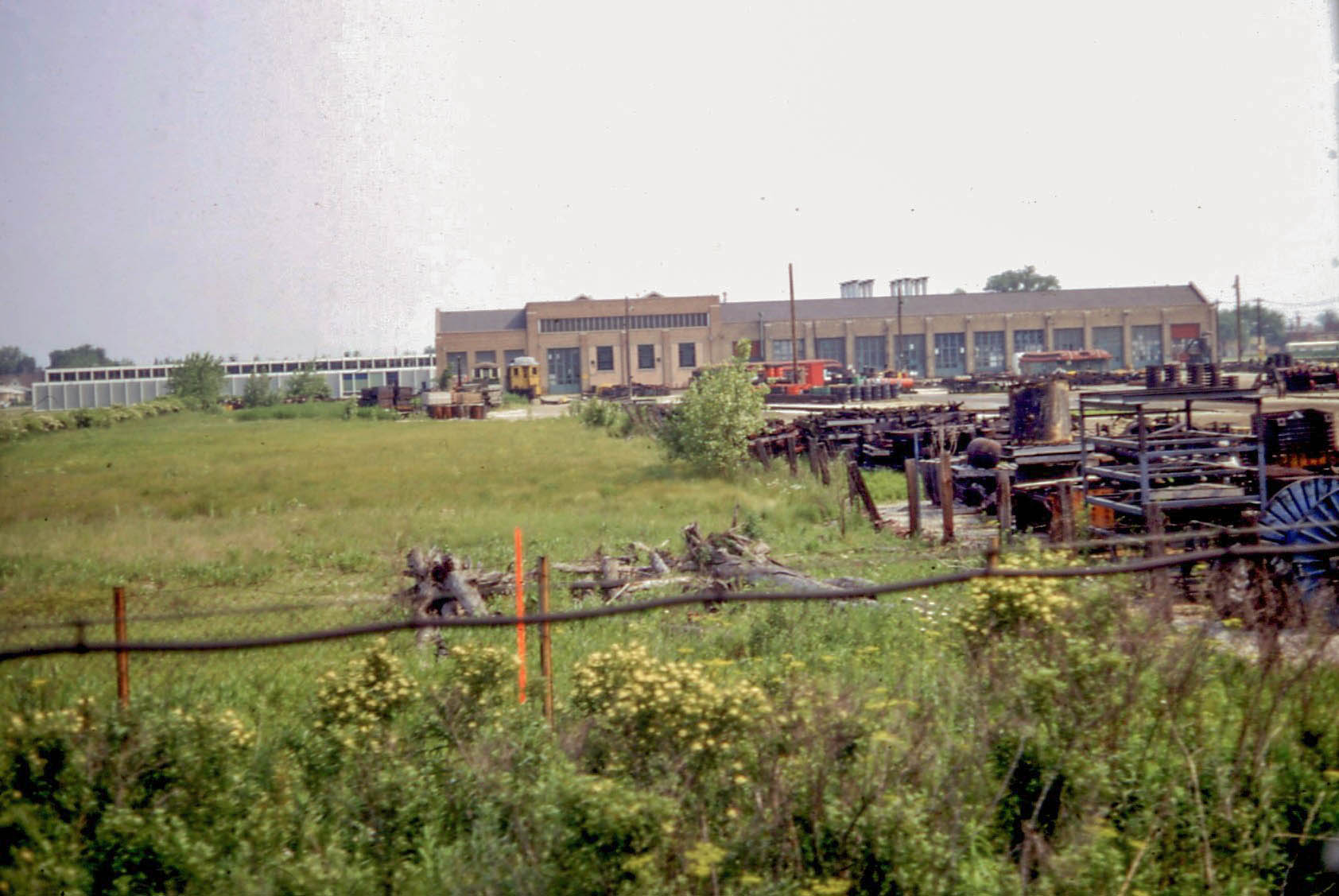
The shops in 1968

The Chicago Transit Authority took over the operation of the "L" system from the CRT in 1947, and discontinued the local service on the Skokie Valley Route in 1948. The CTA retained the rights to use the tracks to access the shops. In the early 1950s, the CTA consolidated more of its maintenance services at the Skokie Shops, reassigning skilled craftspeople employed at its other railyards to Skokie. The CNS&M ceased service in January 1963, and abandoned its rail lines. As a result, the CTA was forced to purchase 2.7 miles (4.3 km) of track from the CNS&M to retain access to the Skokie Shops.

Passenger service over the Skokie Valley Route resumed in April 1964 as a demonstration project, supported by federal funding. The service was marketed as the Skokie Swift, and operated as a shuttle from Dempster Street to Howard Street. The staff of the Skokie Shops developed an automatic pantograph control system to replace the manually operated trolley poles on previous rolling stock, which enabled one-person operation on the Skokie Swift. The service exceeded expectations and was made a permanent part of the "L" system. During a systemwide reorganization in the early 1990s, the Skokie Swift was renamed the Yellow Line.

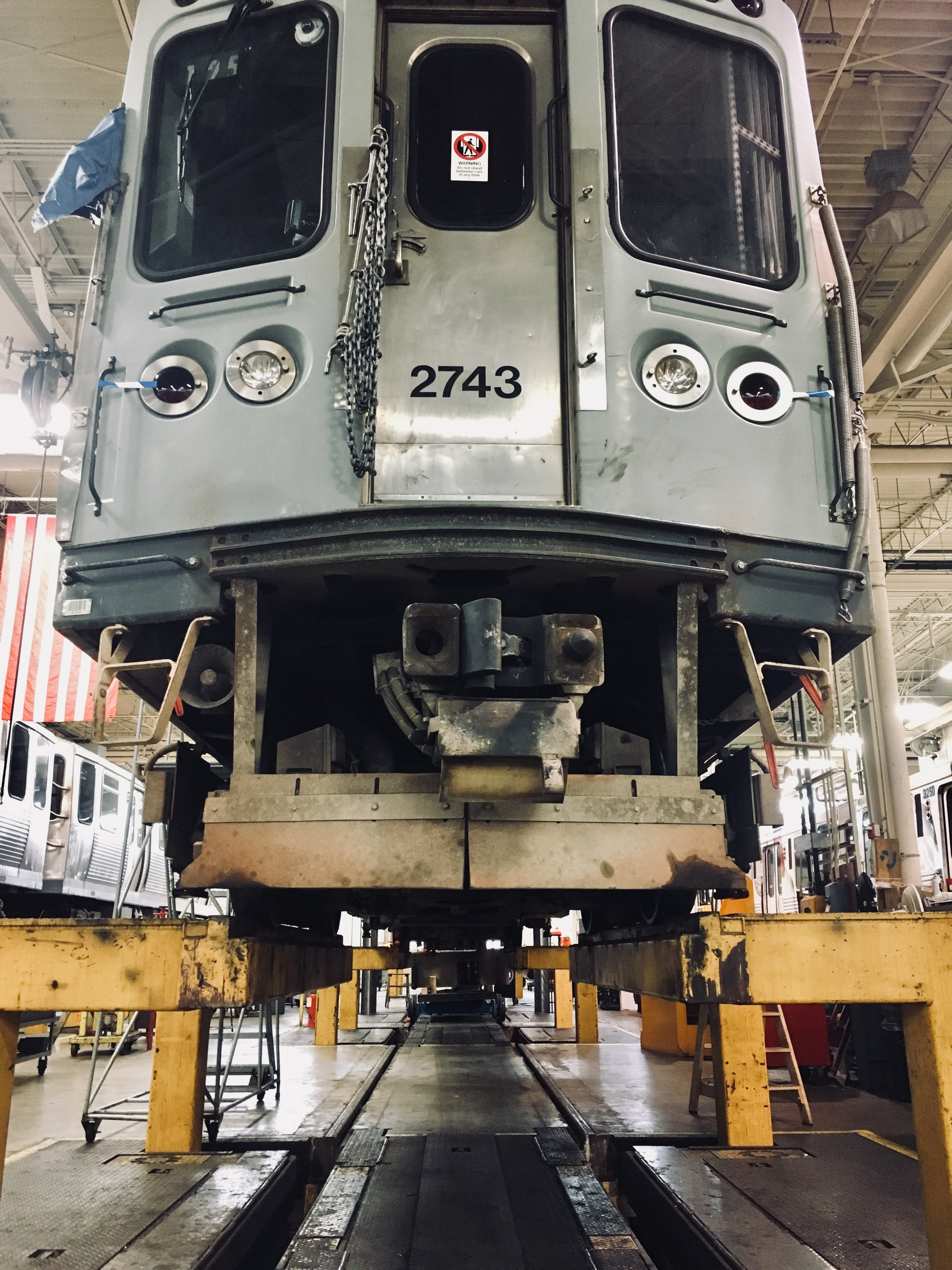
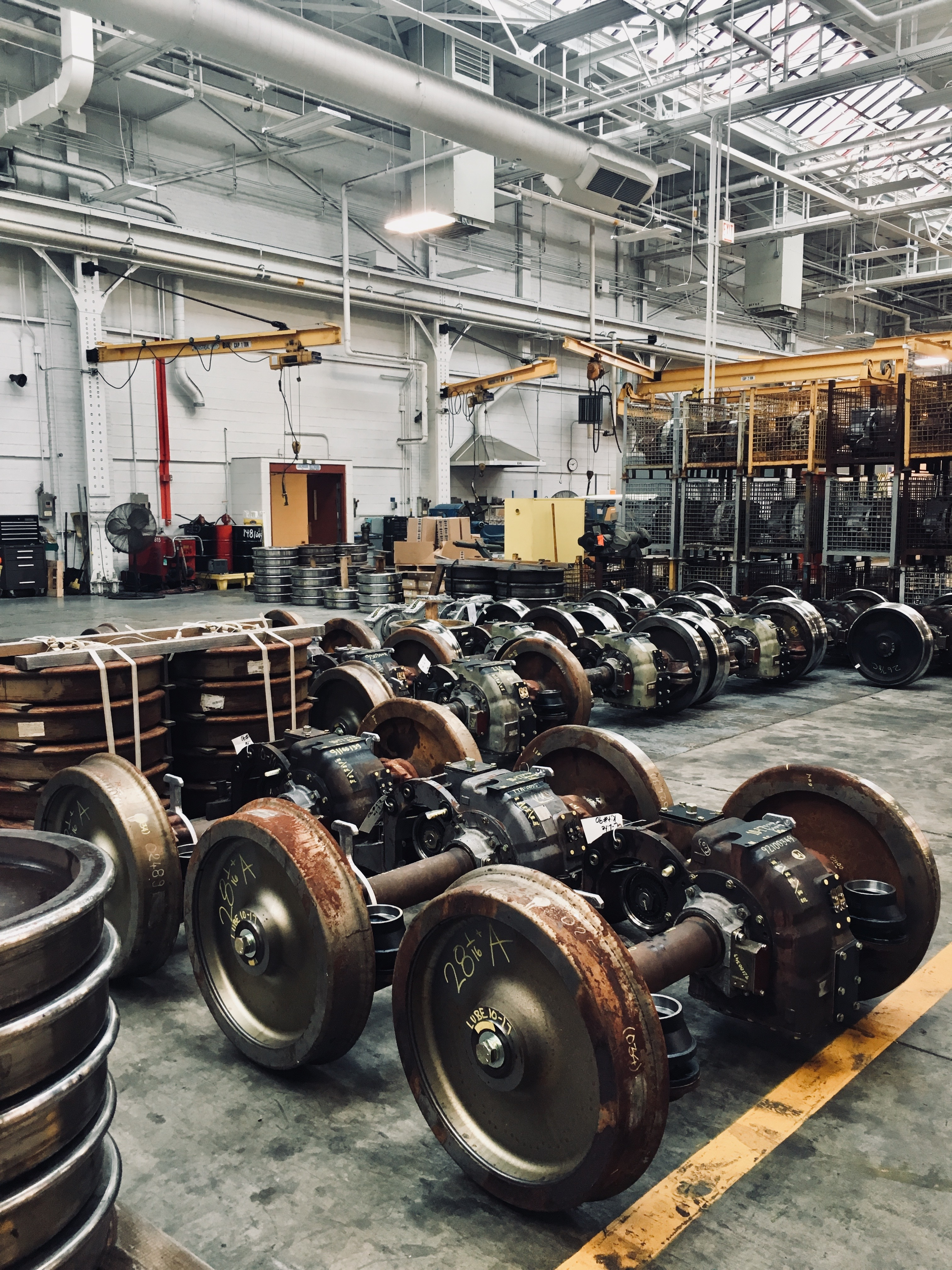
Interior of the shops during a 2017 open house

The Skokie Shops were extensively remodeled in the late 1990s, as part of a larger program of improvements to the Skokie Swift service. The remodeling of the Skokie Shops included the demolition of the oldest buildings in the complex. In 2003, the Skokie Shops employed a staff of approximately 350.

The Skokie Shops were cut off from the rest of the "L" network from May to October 2015. An embankment collapsed at a Metropolitan Water Reclamation District facility east of the shops, damaging the Yellow Line tracks. Yellow Line service was suspended, but the shops remained operational, continuing their acceptance inspections of new 5000-series cars and overhaul work on 3200-series cars. During the track closure, "L" cars were trucked 22 miles (35 km) from Skokie to the Lower 63rd Yard, the only other CTA facility equipped to transfer railcars to trucks.
