= Encompass Insurance Company =

Insurance company

- Type: Subsidiary
- Industry: Insurance
- Founded: 1999; 27 years ago
- Headquarters: Northbrook, Illinois, U.S.
- Products: Home, Auto, and Home Business Insurance, Personal Umbrella Insurance
- Revenue: US$1 billion
- Number of employees: 1,400 (July 2016)
- Parent: Allstate
- Website: Official Website

Encompass Insurance Company is a subsidiary of Allstate Corporation and is one of the largest personal property and casualty insurance brands sold through a network of more than 6,500 independent agent locations across the United States. The company that would become Encompass was founded in 1897 and officially became the Encompass Insurance Company in the 1990s. The company has its headquarters in Northfield Township, Illinois, near Northbrook, Illinois.

== History ==
In 1897, the company that would become Encompass began selling personal insurance under the motto "Protection and Security." The company’s package policy dates back to then.

In 1999, Illinois-based Allstate Insurance Company purchased the personal lines insurance business from CNA Financial when CNA moved toward commercial lines. Allstate then introduced the Encompass name to its subsidiary in 2000.

Encompass distributes its products through 6,500 independent agency locations in 42 states.

Encompass was the title sponsor of the Encompass Championship Tour celebrity pro-am golf tournament in Tampa, Florida, in February 2012, and in Glenview, Illinois, from 2013-2015.

In February 2015, the Encompass Championship was the Donor Spotlight for the First Tee Open, a youth development initiative of the World Golf Foundation supported by organizations in golf including the Masters Tournament, Ladies Professional Golf Association, Professional Golfers’ Association of America, PGA Tour and United States Golf Association. The Encompass Championship selected three other youth-serving organizations as charity partners that year as well: Daniel Murphy Scholarship Fund, Junior Achievement of Chicago and JDRF.

In July 2020, Allstate announced to be acquiring National General for $4 billion, which was closed in January 2021.

== Corporate leadership ==
=== Presidents ===
- Peter Rendall (2021-present)
- Patrick Macellaro (2016–2021)
- Mark Green (2016–2016)
- Tom Ealy (2011–2015)
- Cynthia Young (2006–2011)
- Doug Wendt (2004–2006)
- Ernie Lauser (2000–2004)
- Bruce Marlow (1999-2000)

== Awards and recognition ==
- Outstanding Achievements in Interface Leadership - Applied Systems (2010)
- Acord Award for Property & Casualty Round Trip of Data - ACORD (2011)
- Diversity Award - National African American Insurance Association National Conference (2011, 2013)
- Interface Partner Award - Applied Systems (2012)

Encompass is backed by a number of independent rating agencies based on profitability, adequacy of capital liquidity, company management and investment risk.

An A.M. Best ranking of A+ (Superior) was given to the following Encompass underwriting companies: Encompass Indemnity Company, Encompass Insurance Company, Encompass Insurance Company of America, Encompass Property and Casualty Company, Encompass Independent Insurance Company, Encompass Insurance Company of Massachusetts and Encompass Home and Auto Insurance Company.

Encompass Insurance Company of New Jersey and Encompass Property and Casualty Insurance Company of New Jersey share the A.M. Best rating of A−, same as their parent company Allstate New Jersey Insurance Company, as of December 2015.

Encompass Floridian Indemnity Company and Encompass Floridian Insurance Company are rated B− by A.M. Best, same as their parent company Castle Key Insurance Company.

== Products available ==
The EncompassOne policy offers three tiers of comprehensive coverage for homes, vehicles and collectables. They are Elite, Deluxe and Special and are available in most states.

=== Insurance products ===
Homeowners, condominium, renters and landlord insurance, auto, motorcycle, recreational vehicle insurance, boat and personal watercraft insurance, personal umbrella, scheduled personal property, home based business insurance, identity theft restoration protection.
