= Allstate (vehicle brand) =

American brand of vehicles marketed by Sears

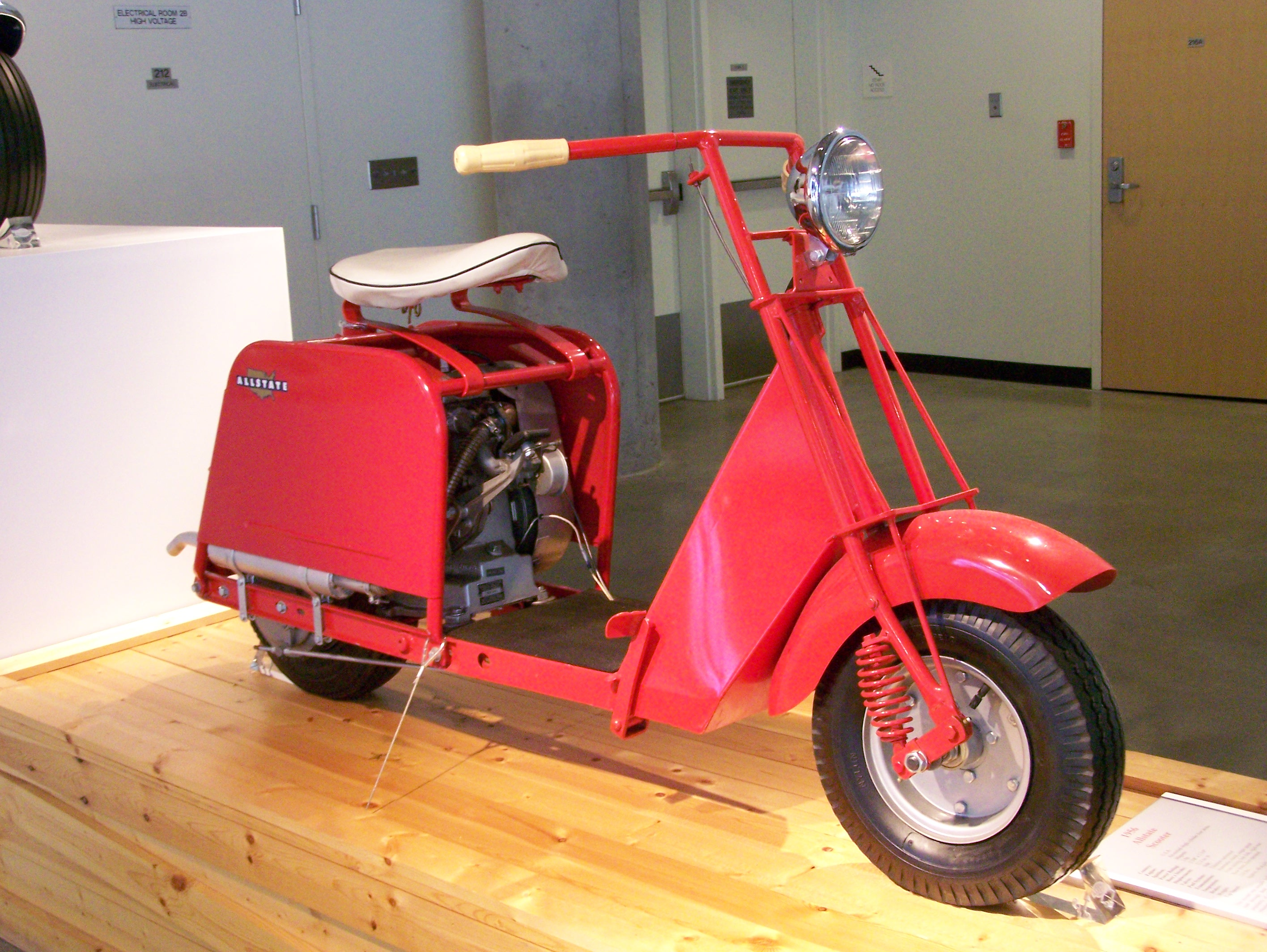
1956 Allstate scooter.

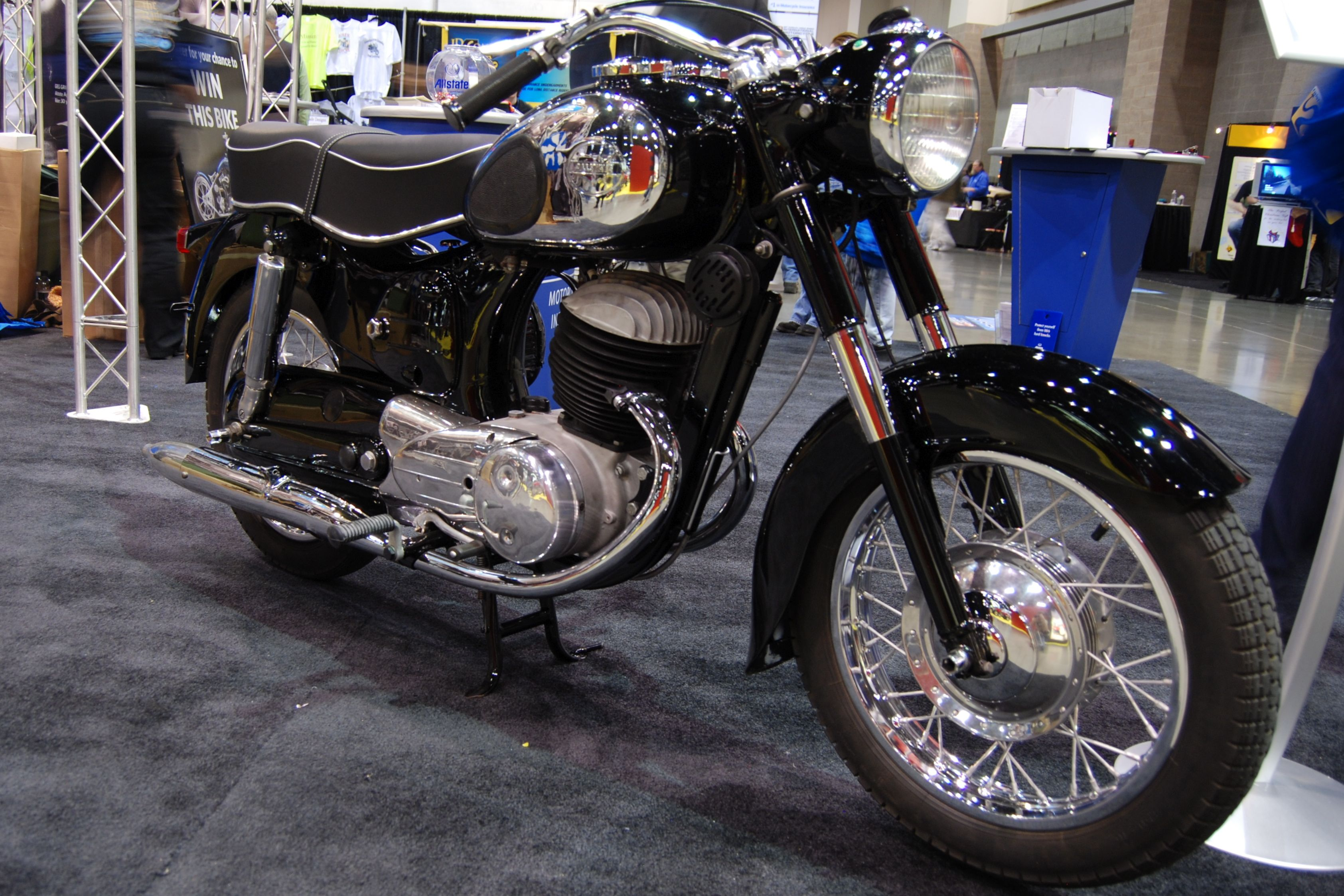
1965 Allstate Puch 250 SGS at the 2009 Seattle International Motorcycle Show.

Allstate was an American brand of vehicles marketed by Sears. Scooters, motorcycles, and cars were sourced from several manufacturers and re-badged with the Sears "Allstate" brand. Piaggio and Cushman were major suppliers of scooters, while Puch and Gilera supplied mopeds and motorcycles, and cars at different times were supplied by the Lincoln Motor Car Works and Kaiser-Frazer.

== Cushman scooters ==
- 1948 811.30 3 hp Cushman Scooter
- 1951–58 811.40 4 hp Cushman Scooter
- 1951 711.30 3 hp Cushman Scooter
- 1954 811.40 4 hp Cushman/Allstate Scooter
- 1957–60 Jetsweep (Cushman Pacemaker)
- 1958 811.94300 Cushman Scooter

== Piaggio scooters ==
- 1951 788.100 Vespa 125cc
- 1952 788.101 Vespa 125cc
- 1952 788.102 Vespa 125cc
- 1953 788.103 Vespa 125cc
- 1954 788.104 Vespa 125cc
- 1955 788.94490 Vespa 125cc
- 1956 788.94491 Vespa 125cc
- 1957 788.94492 Vespa 125cc
- 1958 788.94493 Vespa 125cc
- 1958–60 788.94494 Vespa 125cc
- 1961–62 788.94495 Vespa 125cc
- 1963 788.94330 Vespa 125cc
- 1964 788.94331 Vespa 125cc
- 1965 788.94332 Vespa 125cc
- 1966 788.94370 Vespa 125cc (Badged "Sears," not Allstate)
- 1966 788.94360 Vespa 150cc (Badged "Sears," not Allstate)

== Allstate automobile ==
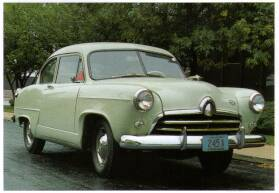
1952 Allstate

- 1951 Allstate Deluxe (6-cyl. Henry J)
- 1951 Allstate (4-cyl. Henry J)

== Other vehicles sold as Allstates ==
- Puch mopeds, scooters, and motorcycles, 1954–69 (switched from Allstate to Sears badging in 1967)
- Gilera motorcycles, late 1966 to 1969 (badged as Sears, not Allstate) (106cc and 124cc single-cylinder 4-stroke engines. The 106cc was a 4-speed, and the 124cc was a 5-speed)
