= SquareTrade =

U.S. consumer products extended warranty provider owned by Allstate

SquareTrade Inc.
- Type: Subsidiary
- Founded: 1999; 27 years ago
- Founder: Ahmed Khaishgi; Steven Abernethy
- Headquarters: Brisbane, California
- Area served: Worldwide
- Key people: Mike Zmugg, SVP, President, APP North America and Interim President
- Products: Consumer Electronics and Appliances Warranty
- Revenue: US$1.32 billion
- Parent: Allstate
- Website: squaretrade.com (US) squaretrade.co.uk (UK) squaretrade.fi (Finland)

SquareTrade Inc. is an American-based extended warranty service provider for consumer electronics and appliances headquartered in Brisbane, California.

== Dispute resolution services ==
Founded by Ahmed Khaishgi in 1999, SquareTrade launched as the first online service for resolving e-commerce disputes. SquareTrade worked with online marketplaces, such as eBay, utilizing an online negotiation tool to automate the dispute resolution process between sellers and buyers. Between 1999 and 2001, SquareTrade raised $15 million in funding from JP Morgan Partners, Weston Presidio Capital, and Draper Richards. That same year, the company launched a merchant-verification service, the SquareTrade Seal. Both original services have since been discontinued.

== Warranty services ==
In 2006, SquareTrade began offering consumer protection plans for portable devices, appliances, and other electronics, both online and through large retailers. That same year, PC Magazine ranked it number 93 on its list of the "Best 100 Web Sites of the Year". In 2012, Bain Capital and Bain Capital Ventures announced a $238 million investment in SquareTrade, which was the second-largest venture capital deal of the year.

The company's underwriter has been AmTrust Financial Services, Inc., but as of 2013, SquareTrade was shifting toward Starr Indemnity.

SquareTrade was acquired by Allstate in late 2016, for $1.4 billion, joining Allstate's suite of consumer asset protection services.

== Lawsuit ==
In late 2016, a class-action lawsuit was filed against SquareTrade, accusing the company of selling protection plans for products that were not eligible for coverage, which customers only discovered when filing a claim.
