= Eugene Anderson (lawyer) =

American trial lawyer

- Born: October 24, 1927; Portland, Oregon
- Died: July 30, 2010 (aged 82); Manhattan, New York
- Education: New York University School of Law
- Occupation: Trial lawyer

Eugene Robert Anderson (October 24, 1927 – July 30, 2010) was an American trial lawyer who developed creative solutions to require insurance companies to cover commercial claims related to asbestos exposure and pollution, years after the original policies had been issued.

== Early life ==
Anderson was born on October 24, 1927, in Portland, Oregon. As the child of a single mother who was frequently disabled, Anderson lived at various times in orphanages and foster care. He worked to pay for his college education and graduated from the University of California, Los Angeles. While hitchhiking cross country, he was picked up one day by a lawyer who helped him gain admission to Harvard Law School. He received an LL.M. degree from New York University School of Law.

== Legal career ==
He worked his way up to partner at the law firm of Chadbourne & Parke, but left to become an Assistant United States Attorney for the Southern District under Robert M. Morgenthau. He started his own practice in 1969, which was ultimately known as Anderson Kill & Olick.

Anderson represented companies that had been the targets of lawsuits by individuals claiming that they had been exposed to material like asbestos or toxic waste, who often became ill and filed claims many years after they had first come into contact with the material. Companies that tried to make claims to cover their costs found that business insurers would pass the buck. A company that had used different insurers over the years would find that firms would say that the insurer who should be responsible was either the one who insured the company when the individual was exposed, or the one that was the insurer when the person became ill, or the one who provided coverage when the person filed suit or sought coverage. Each insurer would point the finger at the other and no one company would accept responsibility. In lawsuits filed on behalf of corporations, Anderson helped establish the principle in federal appellate court of the "triple trigger", which would allow a company to be covered at any of the points where an individual was either exposed, turned ill or filed a claim.

A resident of Manhattan, Anderson died at NewYork–Presbyterian Hospital/Weill Cornell Medical Center at age 82 on July 30, 2010, due to double pneumonia. He was survived by his wife, a son and three grandsons.
