= Allstate Northern Ireland =

Technology company headquartered in Northern Ireland

Allstate in Northern Ireland
- Type: Subsidiary
- Industry: Software & Technology
- Founded: 1999; 27 years ago
- Headquarters: Belfast, Northern Ireland
- Key people: Stephen McKeown, Managing Director
- Products: Software
- Parent: Allstate
- Website: www.allstateni.com

Allstate in Northern Ireland, also styled as Allstate NI, is a digital centre of excellence based in Belfast and Derry in Northern Ireland.

As of 2023, the company employs around 2,400 workers.

== History ==
The company was previously known as "Northbrook Technology". As of May 7, 2008, Northbrook Technology was rebranded to Allstate in Northern Ireland.

The company established its first office in Corporation Street, Belfast. The company then moved its headquarters to a larger building in Lanyon Place. In 2018 they moved into a new building in Mays Meadow.

In 2008 they opened another two offices in Derry Strabane. The Strabane office was due to close in 2023, with employees continuing to work from home.

In 2015, Allstate in Northern Ireland opened an Extreme Agile software development lab and learning space (CompoZed Labs) in its Belfast headquarters.

== Leadership ==
In March 2023, Stephen McKeown became Vice President and Managing Director at Allstate NI.

== Awards ==
Allstate NI has won business awards at local and national level, including two Queen's Award for Enterprise. for 'Best Enterprise and International Trade' in 2005 for 'Enterprise - Sustainable Development' in 2014.

In 2022, the company won 11 business and corporate awards, including Digital DNA’s Workplace of the Year.

In 2024 Allstate NI won Best Use of Cloud Services at the Belfast Telegraph IT Awards.

In 2025 Allstate NI won Best Place to Work in IT (Over 100 Employees) at the Belfast Telegraph IT Awards.
